= List of railway stations in Punjab, India =

The following is a list of railway stations belonging to Indian Railways in the state of Punjab, India. (Note: All stations belong to Northern Railway zone unless otherwise mentioned.)

== A ==
Station Name	Station Code	Division	Elevation
Abohar Junction	ABS	Ambala	186 m
Ahmadgarh	AHH	Ambala	256 m
Amritsar Junction	ASR	Firozpur	230 m
Anandpur Sahib	ANSB	Ambala	285 m
Attari	ATT	Firozpur	232 m

== B ==
Station Name	Station Code	Division	Elevation
Barnala	BNN	Ambala	229 m
Bassi Pathana	BSPN	Ambala	274 m
Batala Junction	BAT	Firozpur	247 m
Beas Junction	BEAS	Firozpur	237 m
Bhangala	BNGL	Firozpur	258 m
Bharoli Junction	BHRL	Firozpur	320 m
Bathinda Cantonment	BTIC	Ambala	208 m
Bathinda Junction	BTI	Ambala	207 m
Bhogpur Sirwal	BPRS	Firozpur	242 m
Budhlada	BLZ	Delhi	223 m

== D ==
Station Name	Station Code	Division	Elevation
Dalhousie Road	DALR	Firozpur	352 m
Dappar	DHPR	Ambala	299 m
Dasuya	DZA	Firozpur	252 m
Dhariwal India	DHW	Firozpur	262 m
Dhuri Junction	DUI	Ambala	248 m

== F ==
Station Name	Station Code	Division	Elevation
Faridkot	FDK	Firozpur	204 m
Fatehgarh Sahib	FGSB	Ambala	268 m
Fazilka Junction	FKA	Firozpur	179 m
Firozpur Cantonment	FZR	Firozpur	199 m
Firozpur City	FZP	Firozpur	199 m

== G ==
Station Name	Station Code	Division	Elevation
Ghiala	GILA	Firozpur	300 m
Ghaggar	GHG	Ambala	305 m
Gidarpindi	GOD	Firozpur	210 m
Gurdaspur	GSP	Firozpur	265 m

== H ==
Station Name	Station Code	Division	Elevation
Hoshiarpur	HSX	Firozpur	255 m

== J ==
Station Name	Station Code	Division	Elevation
Jagraon	JGN	Firozpur	236 m
Jalandhar Cantonment	JRC	Firozpur	239 m
Jalandhar City	JUC	Firozpur	239 m

== K ==
Station Name	Station Code	Division	Elevation
Kandrori	KNDI	Firozpur	307 m
Kapurthala	KXH	Firozpur	230 m
Khanna	KNN	Ambala	269 m
Kotkapura Junction	KKP	Firozpur	210 m
Kotli Kalan	KTKL	Delhi	220 m

== L ==
Station Name	Station Code	Division	Elevation
Ladhowal	LDW	Firozpur	242 m
Lalru	LLU	Ambala	282 m
Lohian Khas Junction	LNK	Firozpur	215 m
Ludhiana Junction	LDH	Firozpur	247 m

== M ==
Station Name	Station Code	Division	Elevation
Madhopur Punjab	MDPB	Firozpur	357 m
Malerkotla	MET	Ambala	247 m
Mandi Gobindgarh	GVG	Ambala	268 m
Mansa	MSZ	Delhi	222 m
Maur	MAUR	Delhi	220 m
Mirthal	MRTL	Firozpur	261 m
Moga	MOGA	Firozpur	223 m
Morinda Junction	MRND	Ambala	285 m
New Morinda Junction	NMDA	Ambala	279 m
Mukerian	MEX	Firozpur	256 m
Muktsar	MKS	Firozpur	199 m
Mullanpur	MLX	Firozpur	243 m

== N ==
Station Name	Station Code	Division	Elevation
Nabha	NBA	Ambala	250 m
Nagrota	NGRT	Firozpur	82 m
Nakodar Junction	NRO	Firozpur	223 m
Nangal Dam	NLDM	Ambala	355 m
Naya Nangal	NNGL	Ambala	359 m
Nawanshahr Doaba Junction	NSS	Firozpur	256 m

== P ==
Station Name	Station Code	Division	Elevation
Pathankot Junction	PTK	Firozpur	331 m
Pathankot Cantonment	PTKC	Firozpur	331 m
Patiala	PTA	Ambala	256 m
Phagwara Junction	PGW	Firozpur	243 m
Phillaur Junction	PHR	Firozpur	243 m

== R ==
Station Name	Station Code	Division	Elevation
Rajpura Junction	RPJ	Ambala	272 m
Raman (Note: Belongs to North Western Railway zone.)	RMN	Bikaner	204 m
Rupnagar	RPAR	Ambala	277 m

== S ==
Station Name	Station Code	Division	Elevation
Sahnewal	SNL	Firozpur	261 m
Sangat	SGF	Bikaner	203 m
Sangrur	SAG	Ambala	238 m
SAS Nagar Mohali	SASN	Ambala	331 m
Sirhind Junction	SIR	Ambala	238 m
Sunam	SFM	Ambala	235 m
Saila Khurd	SQJ	Firozpur	280 m
Saran	SRM	Firozpur	
Sujanpur	SJNP	Firozpur	335 m

== T ==
Station Name	Station Code	Division	Elevation
Talli Saidasahu	TSS	Firozpur	204 m
Talwandi	TWB	Firozpur	208 m
Tanda Urmar	TDO	Firozpur	241 m
Tapa	TAPA	Ambala	241 m
Tarn Taran Junction	TTO	Firozpur	226 m

== U ==
Station Name	Station Code	Division	Elevation
Unchi Bassi	UCB	Firozpur	249 m

== V ==
Station Name	Station Code	Division	Elevation
Verka Junction	VKA	Firozpur	233 m

== See also ==
- Rail transport in India
- Indian Railways
