= Bhakra =

Bhakra may refer to:

- Bhakra Dam or Bhakra Nangal Dam, a gravity dam in Bhakra, Himachal Pradesh and Nangal, Punjab, India on the Sutlej and Beas rivers
  - Nangal Dam railway station, Nangal, Punjab, India
  - Nangal Dam–Amb Andaura Passenger, a passenger train in India
  - Nangal Dam–Ambala Passenger, a passenger train in India
  - Bhakra Management Board Karamchari Sangh, a trade union of the dam's management
- Bhakra, Nepal, a village in Nepal

== See also ==
- Bhakkar (disambiguation)
