= Nangal Dam–Ambala Passenger =

Train in India

Nangal Dam - Ambala Passenger
Overview
- Service type: Passenger
- Current operator: Northern Railway

Route
- Termini: Ambala Cantonment Junction (UMB); Nangal Dam (NLDM)
- Stops: 21
- Distance travelled: 158 km (98 mi)
- Average journey time: 4h
- Service frequency: Daily
- Train number: 64514/64515

On-board services
- Class: Unreserved
- Seating arrangements: No
- Sleeping arrangements: Yes
- Catering facilities: No
- Entertainment facilities: No

Technical
- Rolling stock: 2
- Track gauge: 1,676 mm (5 ft 6 in)
- Operating speed: 40 km/h (25 mph)

Nangal Dam Ambala Passenger is a Passenger express train of the Indian Railways connecting Ambala Cantonment Junction in Haryana and Nangal Dam in Punjab. It is currently being operated with 64514/64515 train numbers on daily basis.

== Route and halts ==
- Ambala Cantonment Junction
- Dappar
- Ghaggar
- Chandigarh Junction
- SAS Nagar Mohali
- Morinda Junction
- Rupnagar
- Kiratpur Sahib
- Anandpur Sahib
- Nangal Dam

== Average speed and frequency ==
The train runs with an average speed of 40 km/h and completes 158 km in 4 hrs. The train runs on a twice a day.

== See also ==
- Nangal Dam railway station
- Ambala Cantonment Junction railway station
