= Rajpura Junction railway station =

Train station in Punjab, India

Rajpura Junction
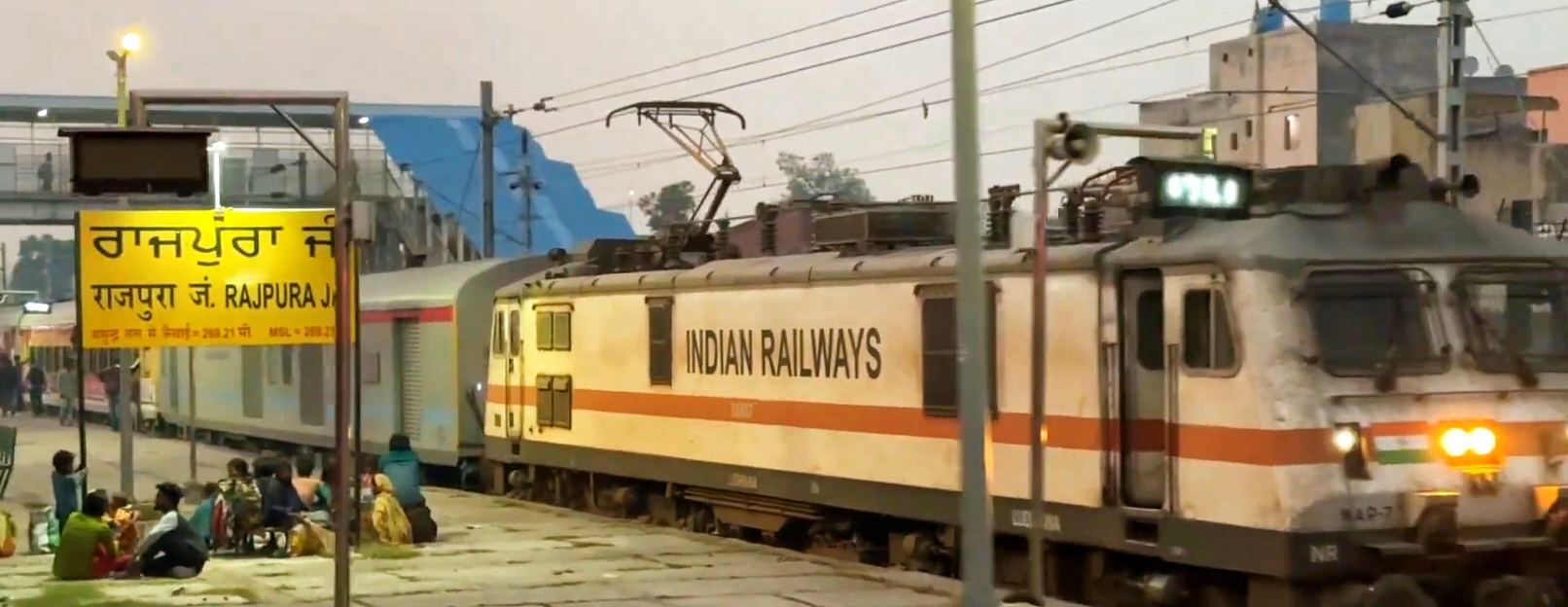
- Saryu Yamuna Express At Rajpura Junction

General information
- Location: Station Rd., Rajpura, Patiala, Punjab; India
- Coordinates: 30°29′10″N 76°35′37″E
- Elevation: 269 metres (883 ft)
- System: Indian Railways junction station
- Owner: Ministry of Railways (India)
- Operator: Indian Railways
- Lines: Ambala–Attari line Bathinda–Rajpura line
- Platforms: 3
- Tracks: 6 nos 5 ft 6 in (1,676 mm) broad gauge

Construction
- Structure type: At grade
- Parking: Yes
- Accessible: Wheelchair available

Other information
- Status: Functioning
- Station code: RPJ
- Zone(s): Northern Railway
- Division(s): Ambala

Passengers
- 2018: 5445 per day
Location
- Location within Punjab Location within India

Rajpura Junction railway station(station code: RPJ) is a railway station serving Rajpura city in Patiala district, Punjab, India. Rajpura is the administrative headquarter of Rajpura subdivision of Patiala district. This station is under the Ambala railway division of the Northern Railway Zone of Indian Railways. This station is categorized in Non-Suburban Group as category NSG4 station by Indian Railways.

== Overview ==
Rajpura Junction railway station is located at an elevation of 269.21 metres (883.2 ft) above sea level. This station is located on the double track, 5 ft 6 in (1,676 mm) broad gauge, Ambala–Sirhind section of Ambala–Attari line and Double track BG Bathinda–Rajpura line.

== Electrification ==
As of 2016, electrification of the single broad-gauge railway line is in progress. The electrification trail between Rajpura and Dhuri was completed on 10 September 2019. The 68 km-long stretch from Dhuri station to Lehra Muhabbat station near Bathinda on Bathinda–Rajpura line was completed in July 2020 after clearance by Commission of Railway Safety(CRS).

== Network ==
It is a junction point, with Patiala (PTA), Dhuri Junction (DUI) and Sri Ganganagar (SGNR) on the branch line and Ambala Cantonment (UMB), Sirhind (SIR) and Ludhiana Junction (LDH) on the main line.

== Amenities ==
Rajpura railway station has 10 booking windows and one enquiry office. The station has all basic amenities like drinking water, public toilets, waiting hall, sheltered area with adequate seating on platforms. The station had footfall of 5445 persons per day in 2018. Wheelchair availability is there for disabled persons. There are three platforms at the station and two foot overbridge connecting platforms.

== See also ==
- List of railway stations in Punjab
