= New Morinda Junction railway station =

Railway station in Punjab, India

New Morinda Junction

General information
- Location: Station Rd, Morinda, Rupnagar, Punjab; India
- Coordinates: 30°08′21″N 74°11′42″E
- Elevation: 279 metres (915 ft)
- System: Indian Railways junction station
- Owner: Indian Railways
- Operator: Northern Railway
- Lines: Sirhind–Daulatpur Chowk line Chandigarh–Sahnewal–Ludhiana line
- Platforms: 2
- Tracks: 3 nos 5 ft 6 in (1,676 mm) broad gauge

Construction
- Structure type: Standard on ground
- Parking: Yes
- Accessible: Wheelchair ramp Wheelchair available

Other information
- Status: Functioning
- Station code: NMDA
- Division(s): Ambala

History
- Opened: 2006

Passengers
- 2018: 137 per day
Location
- Location within Punjab

New Morinda Junction (station code: NMDA) is located in Rupnagar district in the Indian state of Punjab and serves primarily as a junction point to switch trains for passengers. It is located about 2 km from Morinda town center on the outskirts of town. The town is served by older Morinda Junction railway station. New Morinda station falls under Ambala railway division under Northern Railway zone of Indian Railways. Morinda town is the administrative headquarter of Morinda Tehsil in Rupnagar district.

== Overview ==
New Morinda railway station is located at an elevation of 279 metres (915 ft). This station is located on the single track, 5 ft 6 in (1,676 mm) broad gauge, Sirhind–Daulatpur Chowk line and Chandigarh–Sahnewal–Ludhiana line. This station was established as junction point when Chandigarh–Sahnewal line was envisaged to provide direct railway connectivity from capital city Chandigarh to Punjab.

== Electrification ==
New Morinda railway station has three electrified tracks and both lines of this junction are single-track electrified lines.

== Amenities ==
New Morinda railway station has 2 booking windows and no enquiry office. Station is classified under the lowest NSG6 category and has only basic amenities like drinking water, public toilets, sheltered area with adequate seating. Wheelchair availability is also there for disabled persons. There are two platforms at the station and one foot overbridge (FOB).
