= Dhandari Kalan railway station =

Railway station in Punjab, India

Dhandari Kalan
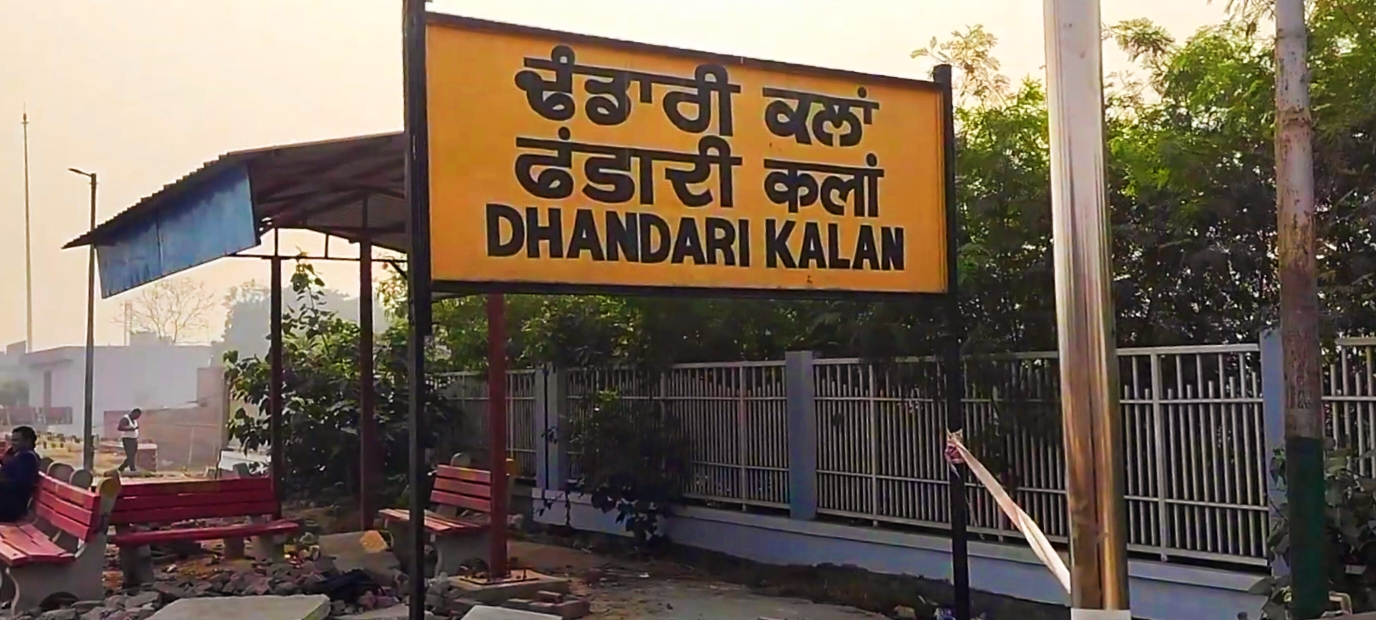
- Dhandari Kalan Railway station

General information
- Location: National Highway 44, Dhandari Kalan, Ludhiana, Ludhiana district, Punjab; India
- Coordinates: 30°52′28″N 75°54′36″E
- Elevation: 254 metres (833 ft)
- System: Indian Railways
- Owner: Indian Railways
- Operator: Northern Railway
- Line: Ambala–Attari line
- Platforms: 3
- Tracks: 5 ft 6 in (1,676 mm) broad gauge

Construction
- Structure type: Standard on ground

Other information
- Status: Functioning
- Station code: DDL
- Division(s): Firozpur

History
- Opened: 1870

Services
Preceding station	Indian Railways	Following station
Ludhiana Junction towards ?	Northern Railway zone Ambala–Attari line	Sahnewal towards ?
Location
- Location within Punjab Location within India

Dhandari Kalan railway station a railway station on Ambala–Attari line under Firozpur railway division of Northern Railway zone. This is situated beside National Highway 44 at Dhandari Kalan, Ludhiana in Ludhiana district in the Indian state of Punjab.

== History ==
Amritsar–Attari line was completed in 1862. the electrification of the line was completed in different period. Shahbad Markanda-Mandi Gobindgarh sector was electrified in 1995–96, the Mandi Gobindgarh–Ludhiana sector in 1996–97, the Phillaur–Phagwara sector in 2002–03, and the Phagwara–Jallandhar City–Amritsar in 2003–04.

== Station layout ==
The station consists of three platforms with standard on-ground infrastructure. Basic passenger amenities are available, including shelters and ticketing facilities.

== Services ==
The station is served primarily by passenger trains and MEMU trains on the Ambala–Attari line. Major nearby railway stations include Ludhiana Junction and Sahnewal.

== Freight operations ==
The station is located within the industrial belt of Ludhiana and supports freight movement related to local industries. It is situated near logistics and inland freight facilities serving the region.

== Amrit Bharat Station Scheme ==
Dhandari Kalan railway station has been identified for redevelopment under the Amrit Bharat Station Scheme, under which multiple stations in Punjab are being modernised with improved passenger amenities and infrastructure.

== Connectivity ==
The station is located along National Highway 44 and is connected to Ludhiana city by road. Public transport options such as buses and auto-rickshaws are available for last-mile connectivity.
