= Amritsar–Khem Karan line =

Railway line in India

Amritsar–Khem Karan line with Beas Branch line

Overview
- Status: Operational
- Owner: Indian Railways
- Locale: Punjab
- Termini: Amritsar Junction; Khemkaran

Service
- Operator: Northern Railway

History
- Opened: 4 April 1910 (Main line); 2011 (Beas branch)

Technical
- Line length: Main line 77 km (48 mi); Tarn Taran–Beas branch line 49 km (30 mi)
- Track gauge: 1,676 mm (5 ft 6 in) Broad Gauge
- Electrification: Yes
- Operating speed: 100 km/h

The Amritsar–Khem Karan line is a railway route on the Northern Railway zone of Indian Railways. This route plays an important role in rail transportation in Punjab state.

The corridor passes through the Plain Areas of Punjab and some portion are near the bank of the Beas River with a stretch of 77 km which connects Amritsar Junction situated on Ambala–Attari line and Khem Karan. It has a branch line that starts from Tarn Taran Junction and ends at Beas Junction with a stretch of 49 km.

== History ==
The main 111 kilometres (69 mi) long railway line from Amritsar Junction to Khem Karan and Kasur via Tarn Taran Junction was originally built by Killick, Nixon and Company with under North Western State Railway Company in Punjab portion as 5 ft 6 in (1,676 mm) broad gauge was constructed on different phases.

- The first phase 23.4 kilometres (14.5 mi), from Amritsar Junction to Tarn Taran was opened on 21 September 1906.
- The second phase 19.8 kilometres (12.3 mi), from Tarn Taran to Patti was opened on 30 December 1906.
- The third phase 33.8 kilometres (21.0 mi), from Patti to Kasur was opened on 4 April 1910.
- The final phase 34 kilometres (21 mi), from Khem Karan to Kasur was opened on 3 January 1911.

After Partition of India in 1947, 34 kilometres (21 mi) The Khem Karan–Kasur link was totally dismantled and the trains run till Khem Karan.

Whereas, the branch line between Tarn Taran Junction and Beas Junction which lies on Ambala–Attari line was opened on different phases.

- The first phase, between Beas Junction to Goindwal was opened on 18 December 1997.
- The second phase, between Tarn Taran Junction to Goindwal was approved on 1997 and opened on 2000.

== Electrification ==
The electrification was started on 2019, As the Amritsar–Tarn Taran–Beas section and the remaining section as Tarn Taran–Khem Karan section is going to be electrified.

== Extension ==
From the Amritsar-Patti-Khem Karan line's Patti station, the new Patti–Mallanwala Khas rail link was approved in 2013 as an additional direct link between Amritsar and Firozpur and the rest of India via the under construction 1,369 metres (4,491 ft) long rail-cum-road bridge on Sutlej River.

== Gallery ==
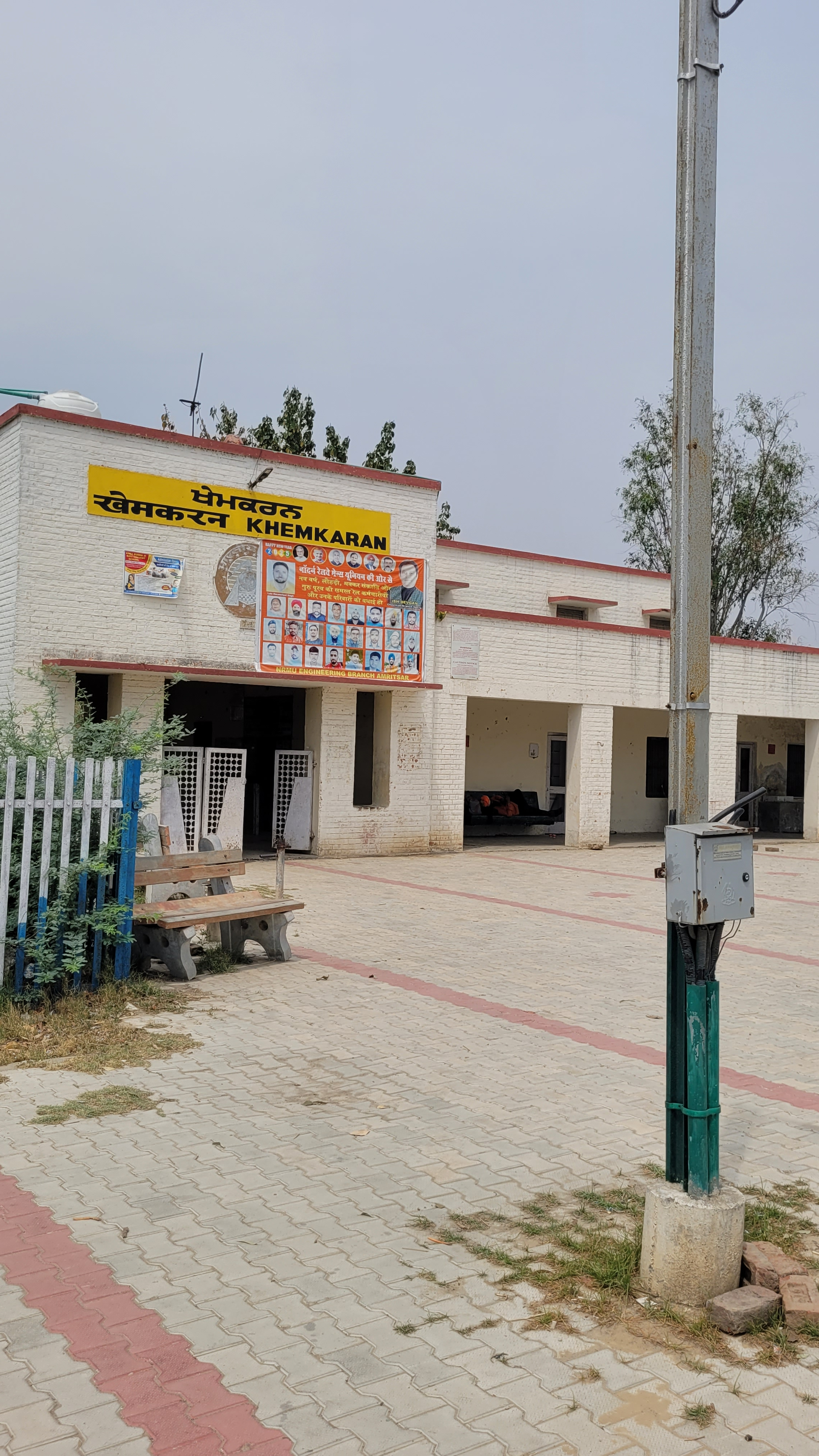
Khem Karan Railway Station, Punjab

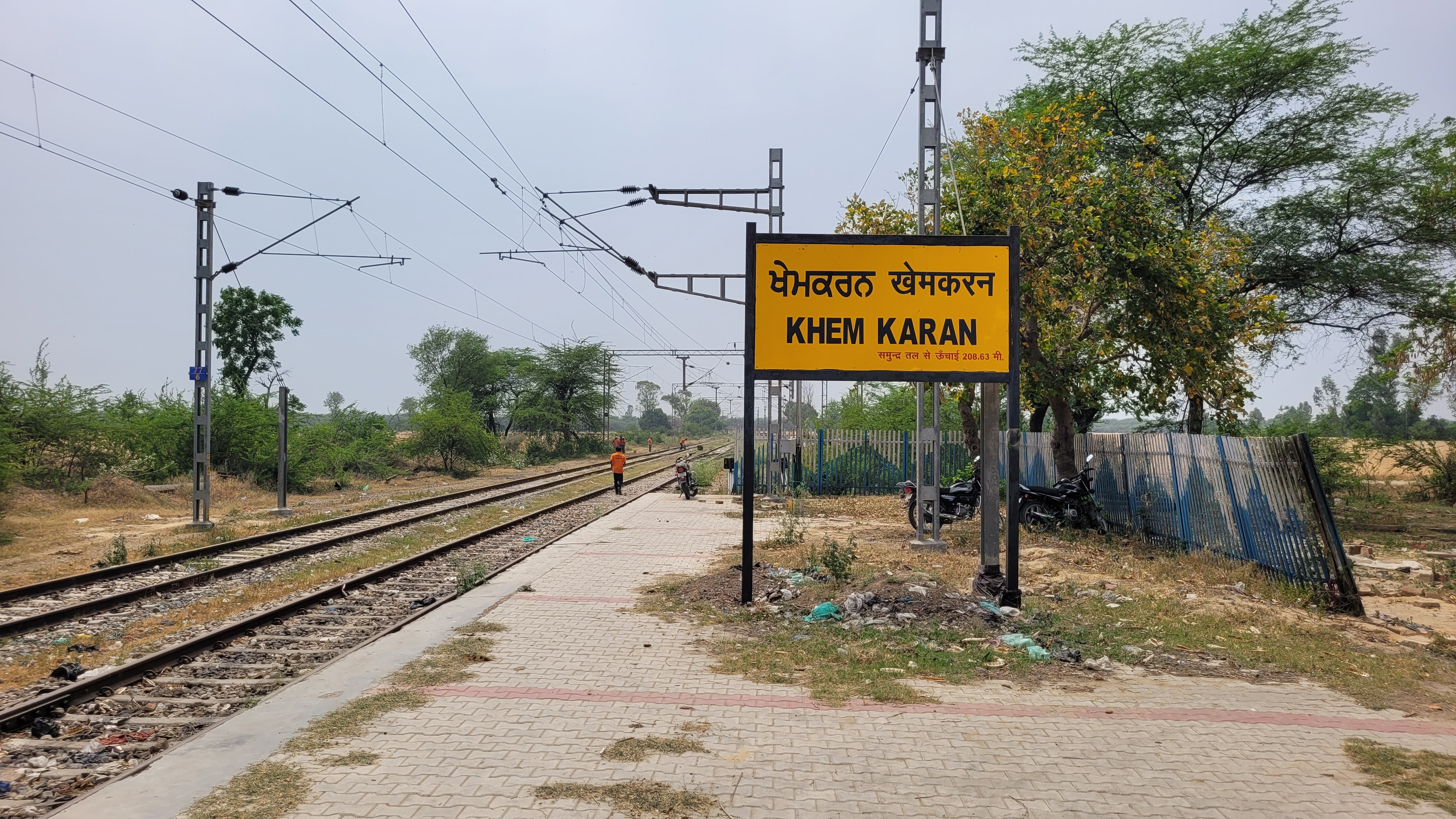
Khem Karan Railway Station
