= Amritsar–Chandigarh Superfast Express =

Train in India

Chandigarh–Amritsar Superfast Express

Overview
- Service type: Superfast Express
- First service: 24 August 2011; 14 years ago
- Current operator: Northern Railway

Route
- Termini: Chandigarh (CDG); Amritsar (ASR)
- Stops: 4
- Distance travelled: 248 km (154 mi)
- Average journey time: 3 hours 55 minutes
- Service frequency: Daily
- Train number: 14541 / 14542

On-board services
- Classes: AC Chair Car, Second Class seating, General Unreserved
- Seating arrangements: Yes
- Sleeping arrangements: No
- Auto-rack arrangements: Overhead racks
- Catering facilities: No pantry car but available
- Observation facilities: Large windows
- Baggage facilities: No
- Other facilities: Below the seats

Technical
- Rolling stock: LHB coach
- Track gauge: 1,676 mm (5 ft 6 in)
- Operating speed: 52 km/h (32 mph) average including halts.

The 14541 / 14542 Chandigarh–Amritsar Superfast Express is a superfast express train belonging to Indian Railways – Northern Railway zone that runs between Amritsar Junction and Chandigarh Junction in India.

It operates as train number 12242 from Amritsar Junction to Chandigarh and as train number 12241 in the reverse direction, serving the Union Territory of Chandigarh and the state of Punjab.

== Coaches ==
The 14542 / 41 Amritsar–Chandigarh Superfast Express has 1 AC Chair Car, 7 Second Class seating, 2 General Unreserved, 1 End on Generator and 1 SLR (Seating cum Luggage Rake) coaches. It does not carry a pantry car.

As is customary with most train services in India, coach composition may be amended at the discretion of Indian Railways depending on demand.

== Service ==
The 14542 Amritsar–Chandigarh Superfast Express covers the distance of 248 kilometres in 3 hours 55 mins (63.32 km/h) and in 4 hours 00 mins as 14541 Chandigarh–Amritsar Superfast Express (62.00 km/h).

As the average speed of the train is above 55 km/h (34 mph), as per Indian Railways rules, its fare includes a Superfast surcharge.

== Routeing ==
The train runs from Amritsar via Beas Junction, Jalandhar City Junction, Ludhiana Junction to Chandigarh.

== Traction ==
As the entire route is fully electrified, a Ghaziabad-based WAP-5 / WAP-7 locomotive powers the train for its entire journey.

== Timings ==
- 14542 Amritsar–Chandigarh Superfast Express leaves Amritsar Junction on a daily basis at 05:15 hrs IST and reaches Chandigarh at 09:10 hrs IST the same day.
- 14541 Chandigarh–Amritsar Superfast Express leaves Chandigarh on a daily basis at 16:40 hrs IST and reaches Amritsar Junction at 21:15 hrs IST the same day.
