= Gawalmandi, Amritsar =

Gawalmandi is a town in the Amritsar district and the pin code is 143001. It is near Amritsar Junction railway station and is about 1.4 km (0.87 mi) from Putlighar market.
