= Chintpurni Marg railway station =

Railway station in Himachal Pradesh

Chintpurni Marg Railway Station

General information
- Location: Kuneran, State Highway 25, Una district, Himachal Pradesh
- Coordinates: 31.722827°N 76.048720°E
- Elevation: 123.500 metres (405.18 ft)
- Owner: Indian Railways
- Platforms: 1
- Tracks: 2
- Connections: Taxi stand, auto stand

Construction
- Structure type: Standard on-ground station
- Cycle facilities: Available
- Accessible: NR

Other information
- Station code: CHMG
- Fare zone: Northern Railway zone, Ambala railway division
Location

Chintpurni Marg is station between Nagal Dam– Una Himchal–Amb Andaura–Daulatpur Chowk rail line.
