= Bachar =

Bachar is a surname. Notable people with the surname include:

- Carmit Bachar (born 1974), member of The Pussycat Dolls
- Dian Bachar (born 1970), American actor
- John Bachar (1957–2009), American rock climber
- Lake Bachar (born 1995), American baseball player
- Mohamed Bachar (born 1992), Nigerien football player
- Oshrat Bachar (born 1979), Israel military officer
- Shai Bachar (born 1969), Israeli sailor
- Yossi Bachar (born 1967), Israeli military officer

== See also ==
- Bachar ladder, a form of rope ladder used as a training device by rock climbers
- Bakhar (disambiguation)
