= Nakodar Junction railway station =

Train station in Punjab, India

Nakodar Junction

General information
- Location: Station Rd., Nakodar, Jalandhar, Punjab; India
- Coordinates: 31°06′43″N 75°28′36″E
- Elevation: 223 metres (732 ft)
- System: Indian Railway junction station
- Owner: Indian Railways
- Operator: Northern Railway
- Lines: Lohian Khas–Nakodar–Phillaur line Jalandhar City–Nakodar line
- Platforms: 2
- Tracks: 3 nos 5 ft 6 in (1,676 mm) broad gauge

Construction
- Structure type: Standard on ground
- Parking: Yes
- Accessible: Wheelchair available

Other information
- Status: Functioning
- Station code: NRO
- Division(s): Firozpur

Passengers
- 2018: 1185 per day
Location
- Location within Punjab

Nakodar Junction (station code: NRO) is located in Jalandhar district in the Indian state of Punjab and serves Nakodar town and nearby villages. Nakodar Town is the administrative headquarter of Nakodar subdivision under Jalandhar district. Nakodar station falls under Firozpur railway division of Northern Railway zone of Indian Railways.

== Overview ==
Nakodar Junction railway station is located at an elevation of 223.27 metres (732.5 ft). This station is located on the single track, 5 ft 6 in (1,676 mm) broad gauge, Lohian Khas–Nakodar–Phillaur line and single track BG Jalandhar City–Nakodar line.

== Electrification ==
Nakodar railway station is situated on single track DMU Lohian Khas–Phillaur line and single track DMU Jalandhar City–Nakodar line. Presently Nakodar station does not have electrified lines but it was reported in Feb 2018 that the electrification of the single track BG Jalandhar City–Nakodar line and the Lohian Khas–Nakodar–Phillaur line was in the pipeline. The central union budget for railways had budgeted funds for the same.

== Amenities ==
Nakodar railway station has 1 booking windows, no enquiry office and basic amenities like drinking water, public toilets, waiting hall, sheltered area with adequate seating etc. The station had small footfall of 1185 persons per day in 2018. Wheelchair availability is there for disabled persons. There are two platforms at the station.

== See also ==
- List of railway stations in Punjab
