= Bharoli Junction railway station =

Train station in Punjab, India

Bharoli Junction

General information
- Location: Station Rd., Bharoli, Pathankot, Punjab; India
- Coordinates: 32°16′17″N 75°37′00″E
- Elevation: 320 metres (1,050 ft)
- System: Indian Railway junction station
- Owner: Indian Railways
- Operator: Northern Railway
- Lines: Amritsar–Pathankot line Jalandhar–Jammu line
- Platforms: 2
- Tracks: 3 nos 5 ft 6 in (1,676 mm) broad gauge

Construction
- Structure type: Standard on ground
- Parking: Yes
- Accessible: No

Other information
- Status: Functioning
- Station code: BHRL
- Division(s): Firozpur

Passengers
- 2018: 253 per day
Location
- Location within Punjab

Bharoli Junction (station code: BHRL) is located in Pathankot district in the Indian state of Punjab and serves Bharoli Kalan village. Bharoli station falls under Firozpur railway division of Northern Railway zone of Indian Railways.

== Overview ==
Bharoli Junction railway station is located at an elevation of 320 metres (1,050 ft). This station is located on the single track, 5 ft 6 in (1,676 mm) broad gauge, Amritsar–Pathankot line which was established in 1884. Bharoli station also lies on double track Jalandhar–Jammu line creating a junction between two routes.

== Electrification ==
Bharoli railway station is situated on single track DMU Amritsar–Pathankot line and double track electrified Jalandhar–Jammu line. It was reported in April 2019 that the electrification of the single track BG Amritsar–Pathankot line had commenced.

== Amenities ==
Bharoli railway station has 2 booking windows, no enquiry office and just very basic amenities like drinking water, public toilets, sheltered area with adequate seating. The station had small footfall of 253 persons per day in 2018. Wheelchair availability is not there for disabled persons. There are two platforms at the station but no foot over bridge(FOB).
