= Bhakkar (disambiguation) =

Bhakkar is a city in Punjab, Pakistan.

Bhakkar may also refer to:

- Bhakkar District, a district of Punjab (Pakistan)
- Bhakkar Tehsil, a tehsil of district Bhakkar
- Bhakkar railway station, a railway station in Pakistan.

== See also ==
- Bakkar, an Egyptian cartoon series
- Bakhar (disambiguation)
- Barkhan (disambiguation)
- Bhakra (disambiguation)
