= Faridkot railway station =

Train station in Punjab, India

Faridkot
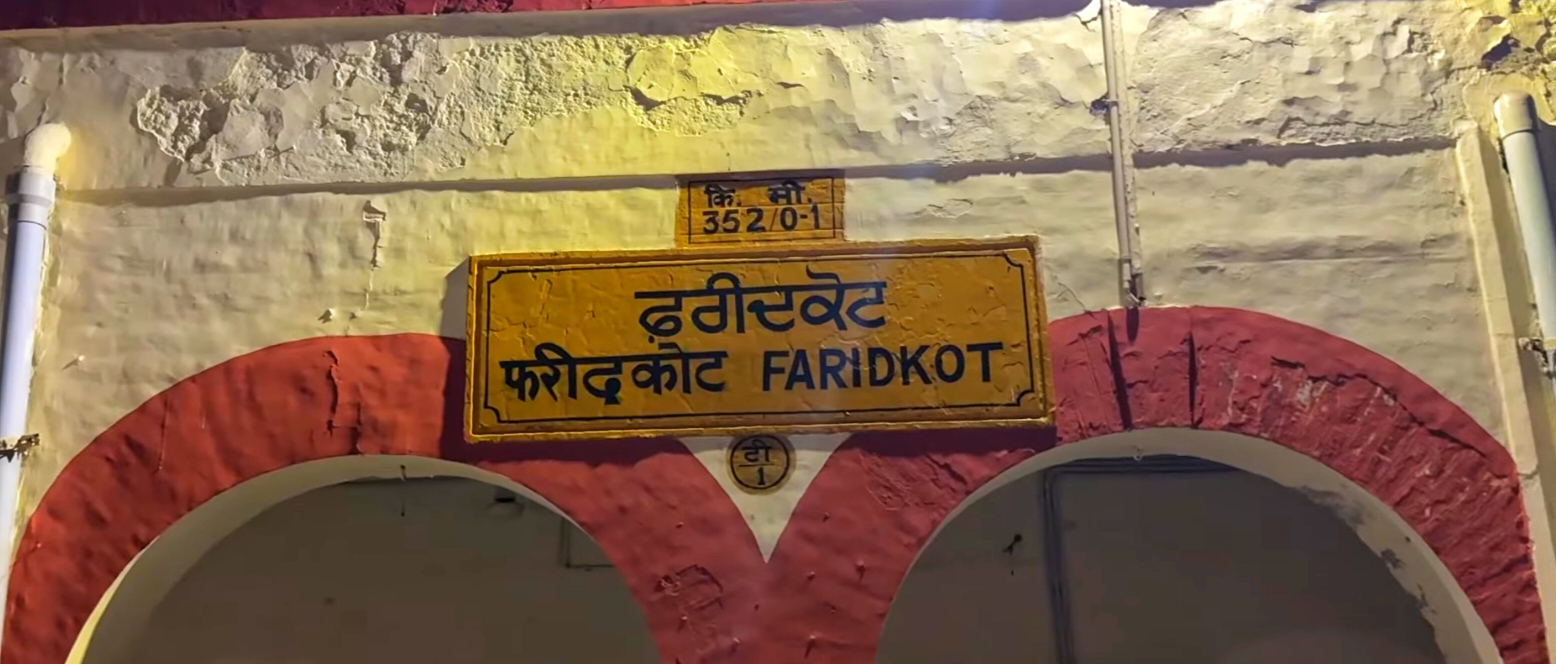
- Faridkot Railway Station

General information
- Location: Station Rd, Faridkot, Punjab; India
- Coordinates: 30°40′57″N 74°45′44″E
- Elevation: 204 metres (669 ft)
- System: Indian Railway
- Owner: Indian Railways
- Operator: Northern Railway
- Line: Firozpur-Bathinda line
- Platforms: 3
- Tracks: 5 ft 6 in (1,676 mm) broad gauge

Construction
- Structure type: Standard on ground
- Parking: Yes
- Cycle facilities: Yes

Other information
- Status: Functioning
- Station code: FDK
- Division(s): Firozpur
Location
- Location within Punjab

Faridkot (station code: FDK) is a railway station located in Faridkot district in the Indian state of Punjab and serves Faridkot city. Faridkot station falls under Firozpur railway division of Northern Railway zone of Indian Railways.

== The railway station ==
Faridkot railway station is at an elevation of 204 metres (669 ft) and was assigned the code – FDK. The station is located on the single track, 5 ft 6 in (1,676 mm) broad gauge Bhatinda–Firozpur railway line. It is well connected to a number of major cities.

== Electrification ==
The electrification of the single track, 87 km Bhatinda–Firozpur railway sector was sanctioned at a cost of Rs 223.93 crore in September, 2018. The completion of electrification is expected by March 2022.

== Amenities ==
Faridkot railway station has computerized reservation counters, and all basic amenities.
