= Electric Loco Shed, Ludhiana =

Loco shed in Punjab, India

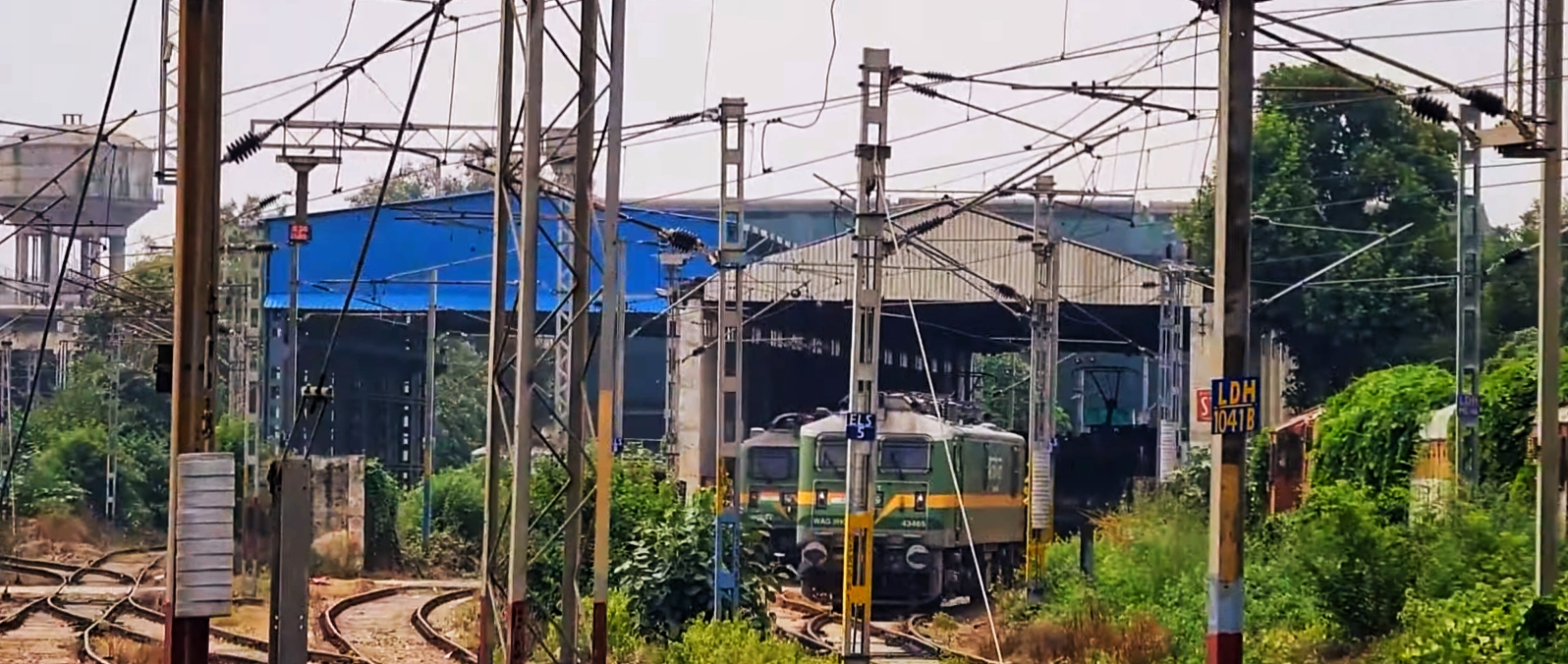
- LDH based WAG-9 At Electric Loco Shed, Ludhiana

- Location within Punjab

Location
- Location: Ludhiana, Punjab
- Coordinates: 30°54′43″N 75°50′53″E

Characteristics
- Owner: Indian Railways
- Operator: Northern Railway zone
- Depot code: LDH
- Type: Engine shed
- Rolling stock: WAP-7; WAG-9

History
- Opened: 2001; 25 years ago
- Former rolling stock: WAP-4; WAG-5; WAM-4; WAG-7

Electric Loco Shed, Ludhiana is a motive power depot performing locomotive maintenance and repair facility for electric locomotives of the Indian Railways, located at Ludhiana Junction of the Northern Railway zone in Punjab, India.

Ludhiana WAP-7 At Jalandhar City Junction

== Operation ==
Being one of the three electric engine sheds in Northern Railway, various major and minor maintenance schedules of electric locomotives are carried out here. It has a sanctioned capacity of 175 engine units. Beyond the operating capacity, this shed houses a total of 198 engine units, including 55 WAG-7 and 143 WAG-9. LDH used to hold WAP-4 and WAG-5 locomotives, which have all now been transferred to other sheds. Like all locomotive sheds, LDH does regular maintenance, overhaul and repair, including painting and washing of locomotives.

In 2020, the depot built a battery-operated shunter using components scavenged from decommissioned locomotives. The shunter can be powered either directly from overhead wires, or from battery power for a limited time. It operates in place of a diesel shunter.

== Locomotives ==
Serial no.	Locomotive class	Horsepower	Quantity
1.	WAP-7	6350	44
2.	WAG-9	6120	205
Total locomotives active as of January 2026			249
