= Nangal Dam–Amb Andaura Passenger =

Nangal Dam - Daulatpur Chowk Passenger
Overview
- Service type: Passenger
- Current operator: Northern Railway

Route
- Termini: Nangal Dam (NLDM); Amb Andaura (ADDR)
- Stops: 5
- Distance travelled: 44 km (27 mi)
- Average journey time: 1h 10m
- Service frequency: Daily
- Train number: 54581/54582

On-board services
- Class: Unreserved
- Seating arrangements: No
- Sleeping arrangements: Yes
- Catering facilities: No
- Entertainment facilities: No

Technical
- Rolling stock: 2
- Track gauge: 1,676 mm (5 ft 6 in)
- Operating speed: 37 km/h (23 mph)

Nangal Dam - Amb Andaura Passenger is a Passenger express train of the Indian Railways connecting Amb Andaura in Himachal Pradesh and Nangal Dam in Punjab. It is currently being operated with 64514/64515 train numbers on daily basis.

== Route and halts ==
- Nangal Dam
- Naya Nangal
- Raimehatpur
- Una Himachal
- Panoh
- Churaru Takrala
- Amb Andaura

== Average speed and frequency ==
The train runs with an average speed of 37 km/h and completes 44 km in 1 hrs 15 mins.

== See also ==
- Nangal Dam railway station
- Amb Andaura railway station
- Himachal Express
