= SAS Nagar Mohali railway station =

Railway station in Punjab, India

SAS Nagar Mohali
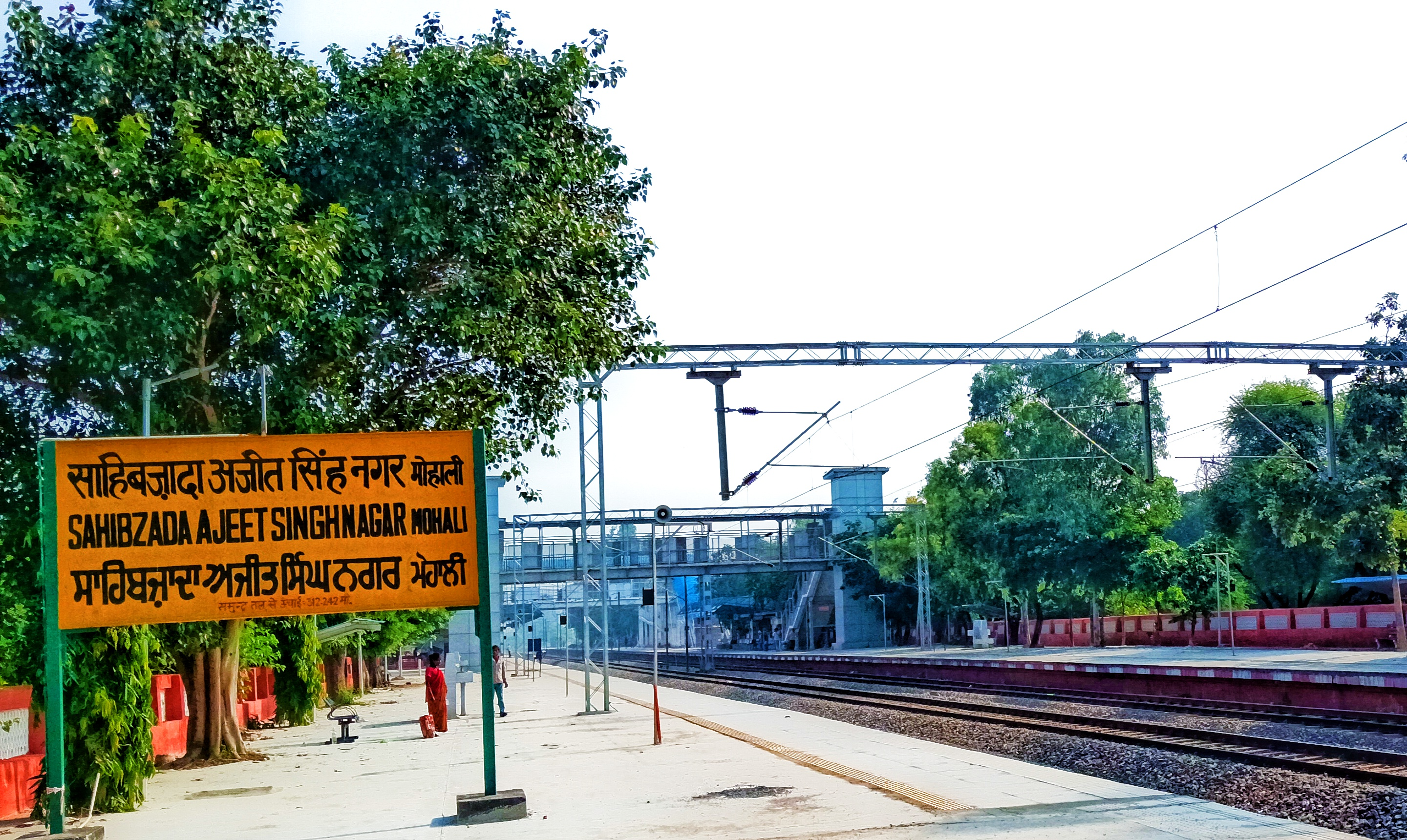
- SAS Nagar Mohali Railway Station

General information
- Location: Industrial Area, Phase 9, Mohali; India
- Coordinates: 30°39′58″N 76°44′23″E
- Elevation: 330.77 metres (1,085.2 ft)
- System: Regional rail and Light rail station
- Owner: Indian Railways
- Operator: Northern Railway zone
- Line: Chandigarh–Sahnewal line
- Platforms: 2
- Tracks: 5 ft 6 in (1,676 mm) broad gauge

Construction
- Structure type: Standard on ground
- Parking: Yes
- Cycle facilities: No

Other information
- Status: Functioning
- Station code: SASN
- Zone(s): Northern Railway zone
- Division(s): Ambala

Services
Preceding station	Indian Railways	Following station
Chandigarh Junction towards ?	Northern Railway zone Mohali–Ludhiana Line	Kharar towards ?
Location
- Location within India Location within Punjab

SAS Nagar Mohali railway station is the main railway station in Sahibzada Ajit Singh Nagar district in Punjab. It serves Mohali, the city adjacent to Chandigarh in the Indian state of Punjab.

== The railway station ==
SAS Nagar Mohali railway station is at an elevation of 310 metres (1,020 ft) and was assigned the code – SASN.

== History ==
The 112 km-long project for linking Chandigarh and Ludhiana directly was completed in three phases. The first phase linking Chandigarh and New Morinda on the Sirhind–Nangal line was opened in September 2006. The second phase for the addition of third line between Sahnewal and Ludhiana on the Ambala–Attari line was completed in November 2012. The third phase linking New Morinda with Ludhiana was completed in April 2013.

== Electrification ==
The Chandigarh–Ludhiana sector is electrified. As per the Central Organisation for Railway Electrification, as on 1.4.2012, 43 km had been completed and 69 km were left.
