= Bakhar (disambiguation) =

Bakhar may refer to:

== Places ==
- Bakhar, historical Island in Sindh, Pakistan
- Bhakkar, principal city of Bhakkar District, Punjab, Pakistan
- Bhakkar District, in Punjab, Pakistan; known as Bakhar in the local Seraiki language
- Bakhar Bar, a town in Punjab, Pakistan

== Other uses ==
- Bakhar, a form of Marathi-language historical narrative written from medieval India
- Barak Bakhar (b. 1979), an Israeli football coach and former player
- Ilan Bakhar (b. 1975), a retired Israeli football player
- Ivan Bakhar (b. 1998), a Belarusian football player

== See also ==
- Bakkar, an Egyptian cartoon series
- Bhakkar (disambiguation)
