= Khemkaran railway station =

General information
- Coordinates: 31.1398°N 74.5535°E
- Owner: Ministry of Railways

Other information
- Station code: KEMK

History
- Former names: Great Indian Peninsula Railway
Location

Khemkaran railway station (Urdu: کھیم کرن ریلوے اسٹیشن) is a railway station in the town of Khemkaran, in Tarn Taran district of Patti tehsil of the Majha region of Punjab, India. The station is on the Amritsar–Khem Karan line.
