= Bharoli Kalan =

- Village
- Location in Punjab, India
- Coordinates: 32°16′11″N 75°36′58″E
- Country: India
- State: Punjab
- District: Pathankot

Area: (2011 Census)
  - Total: 2.79 km^{2} (1.08 sq mi)

Population (2011)
  - Total: 3,768
  - Density: 1,350/km^{2} (3,500/sq mi)

Languages
  - Official: Punjabi
- Time zone: UTC+5:30 (IST)
- PIN: 145025

Bharoli Kalan is a village and locality on the outskirts of Pathankot City in the state of Punjab, India. Prior to creation of Pathankot district after 2011 census, Bharoli Kalan was part of Gurdaspur district. Postal code (PIN) number of Bharoli Kalan is 145025. Bharoli is a gram panchayat in Pathankot Community development block(CD). It is a well developed village in the Dist of Pathankot.

== Demographics ==
As of 2001 India census, Bharoli Kalan had a population of 3369. Males constitute 52% of the population and females 48%. Bharoli Kalan has an average literacy rate of 66%, higher than the national average of 59.5%; with male literacy of 73% and female literacy of 59%. 14% of the population is under 6 years of age. The village belongs to the Mahasha caste which population is over 50% of the total population of the village.

As per 2011 Census of India the population of Bharoli Kalan village had increased to 3,768 persons.

== Transport ==
Bharoli is connected to National Highway 44 (Old NH 1A), which is located just south of the village. The village is also well connected through Bharoli Junction railway station to Punjab state and rest of India.
