= Nawanshahr Doaba Junction railway station =

Train station in Punjab, India

Nawanshahr Doaba Jn.

General information
- Location: Station Rd, Nawanshahr, Shaheed Bhagat Singh Nagar district, Punjab; India
- Coordinates: 31°07′18″N 76°06′32″E
- Elevation: 256.3 metres (841 ft)
- System: Indian Railway
- Owner: Indian Railways
- Operator: Northern Railway
- Lines: Phagwara–Nawanshahar line Nawanshahar–Jaijon line Nawanshahar–Rahon line
- Platforms: 1
- Tracks: 5 ft 6 in (1,676 mm) broad gauge

Construction
- Structure type: Standard on ground
- Parking: Yes

Other information
- Status: Functioning
- Station code: NSS
- Division(s): Firozpur
Location
- Location within Punjab

Nawanshahr Doaba Junction (station code: NSS) is a small railway station located in Shaheed Bhagat Singh Nagar district in the Indian state of Punjab and serves Nawanshahr city which is the administrative headquarter of the district. Nawanshahr Doaba station falls under Firozpur railway division of Northern Railway zone of Indian Railways.

== The railway station ==
Nawanshahr Doaba Junction railway station has low-frequency trains and connects mainly with Jalandhar City Junction railway station. It is located at an elevation of 256.3 metres (841 ft). This station is located on the single track, [5 ft 6 in (1,676 mm) broad gauge, Phagwara–Nawanshahar line. From Nawanshahr Doaba Junction two more lines branch out, the Nawanshahar-Jaijon line and Nawanshahar-Rahon line.

== Electrification ==
Nawanshahr Doaba Junction railway station tracks and line are not electrified.

== Amenities ==
Nawanshahr Doaba railway station has one booking window and all basic amenities like drinking water, public toilets, sheltered area with adequate seating. There is one platform at the station.
