= Sherif Nour =

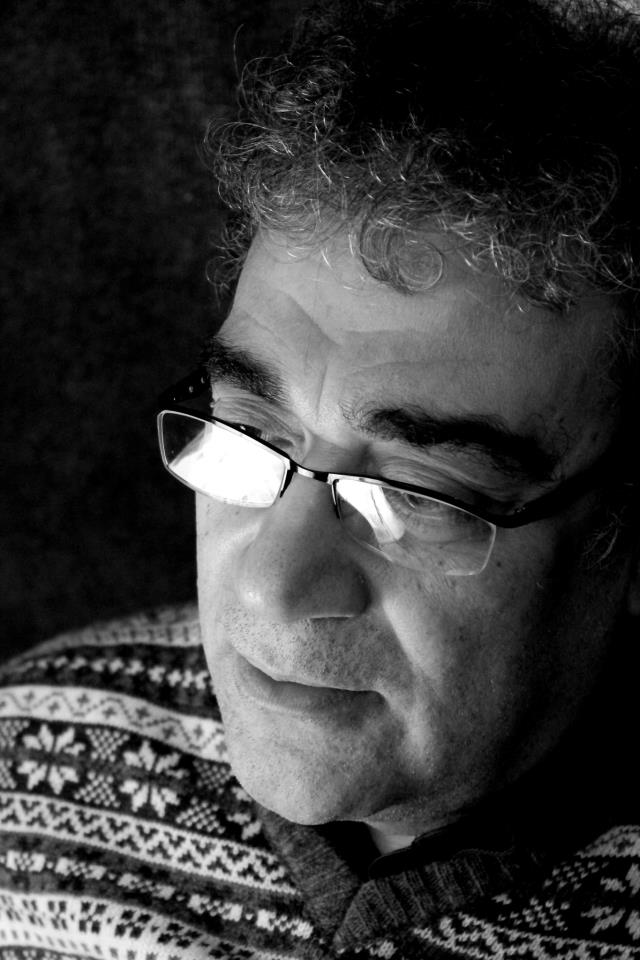
- Nour in 2013
- Born: 28 July 1958 (age 68)
- Education: Helwan University
- Occupation: composer

Sherif Nour (Arabic: شريف نور; born 28 July 1958) is an Egyptian composer. Brought up in Cairo, Nour studied at composition at Helwan University. He has composed for various television, radio serials and films, including providing music for 270 episodes of the Egyptian cartoon Bakaar.

== Early life ==
Nour was born on 28 July 1958. He was brought up in Cairo, Egypt. Nour was born into an artistic family: his father was a theatre critic and script writer.

== Education ==
After completing his high school education Nour studied music, harmony, and music composing at Helwan University. He had originally joined the university's Faculty of Law but left after his father advised him to join the Faculty of Musical Education instead. In the seventies Nour formed a band named Sunshine, which performed Latin music. The band held concerts at clubs, including Heliopolis, Heliolido and El Tayaran. In 1977, Nour started to play at the Sirocco casino in Mersa Matruh during the summer. In 1982, he graduated from Helwan University. The Faculty of Musical Education offered Nour the option to continue his studies and pursue a Masters degree but he refused.

== Career ==
From 1982 to 1993, Nour played concerts at hotels on a daily basis with his band. After an invitation from the singer Mohamed Mounir, he joined Mounir's group, replacing their former keyboardist. Following this, Mounir offered Nour the opportunity to compose music for the play Masaa El Kheir Ya Masr, which was performed at the Egypt Comedy Theatre for two years. At the start of 1996, the Egyptian director Inaam Mohamed Ali offered Nour the chance to compose music for the television serial Noona El Shaanoona. After working on Noona El Shaanoona, Nour decided to continue composing for television programmes and documentaries in addition to animation. His compositional work on animated shows includes the Egyptian cartoons Bakkar (for which he composed music for more than 270 episodes), Super Henedi and Amin's Family.

Nour has participated in a number of concerts abroad, including 35 international festivals in Germany, the Netherlands, the United States and Sweden. He usually travels 3–4 times a year to participate in music festivals in Munich and Frankfurt. Nour has collaborated internationally with musicians, including German guitarist and oud player Roman Bunka, Japanese violinist Hiromi Nishida and German artist Roland Schnffer.

== Honors and awards ==
- Silver award at Cairo Radio and Television Festival
- Gold award from the Arab Broadcasting Union for Kingdom of bees
- Jury Prize at the National Film Festival for the song Hena Makas
- Cairo Radio and Television Festival, 1996
- 5th Cairo Radio and Television Festival, 1999
- Silver and bronze at the 1999 Cairo International Festival for Al Madaen Al Azema
- Nile Drama Channel Awards 2002
- Two-time winner at the 2005 Cairo Radio and Television Festival for Ola Hadana
- Safaqis festival award in 2006 for Mamlaket Taht Al Ard
- UNESCO Prize, 2007

== Discography ==
=== Television ===
- Bakkar – originally directed by Mona Mohamed Abulnasr, later directed by Sharif Gamal
- Nona El Shanona – directed by Inaam Mohmed Ali
- Al-Khayer Yantaser Ahyanan – directed by Ashraf Salem
- Al Meqaad Al-Khalfy – directed by Alaa Karim
- Hassab Al Tawkit Al-Mhaly – for Saudi television, directed by Ashraf Salem
- Fareq Al Asdqaa – directed by Mona Abu El-Nasr
- Haret Abu-Hudedan – directed by Akram Agha
- Alb Al Amar – directed by Mahmoud Ibrahim
- Mr.Ameen Family – for MBC and Al-Shasha, directed by Sharif Gamal
- Super Henedi – starring Mohamed Henedi, Talaat Zakaria, Hanan Turk, Hassan Hosny and Alaa Morsy
- Al-Tabeen – on Al Jazeera for children
- Kingdom of bees – on Nile TV, directed by Adel Khairy
- Alphabet – on Channel One, directed by Faiza Hassan
- Zika w Kawkab Al-Agaeb – directed by Mustafa Alvramawi
- Ola Hadana – directed by Mustafa Alvramawi
- Shebak Lo'lo – directed by Muhammad Haseeb
- Kingdom of Underground – directed by Mustafa Alvramawi
- Science Cities
- Homos and Bondok

=== Theatre ===
- Masaa El Kheir Ya Masr (1996/1997) – directed by Abdul Munim Al-Nasr; starring Mohamed Mounir, Mohamed Awad and Sawsan Badr
- Hend w El-Hagag – directed by Rashad Osman, starring Mohamed Defrawi and Sawsan Badr
- Cinderella – directed by Mr. Lotfi
- Aam Byanola – directed by Mohamed Booth
- The Princess and the Dragon (2009)

=== Radio ===
- Endama Tadhak Al-Domo – directed by Abdel-Moneim Abdel-Karim
- Shawesh Nos Al-Lil – directed by Abdo Diab
- Godran and Ashwak – directed by Abdel-Moneim Abdel-Karim
