= Chandigarh–Sahnewal line =

Railway line in India

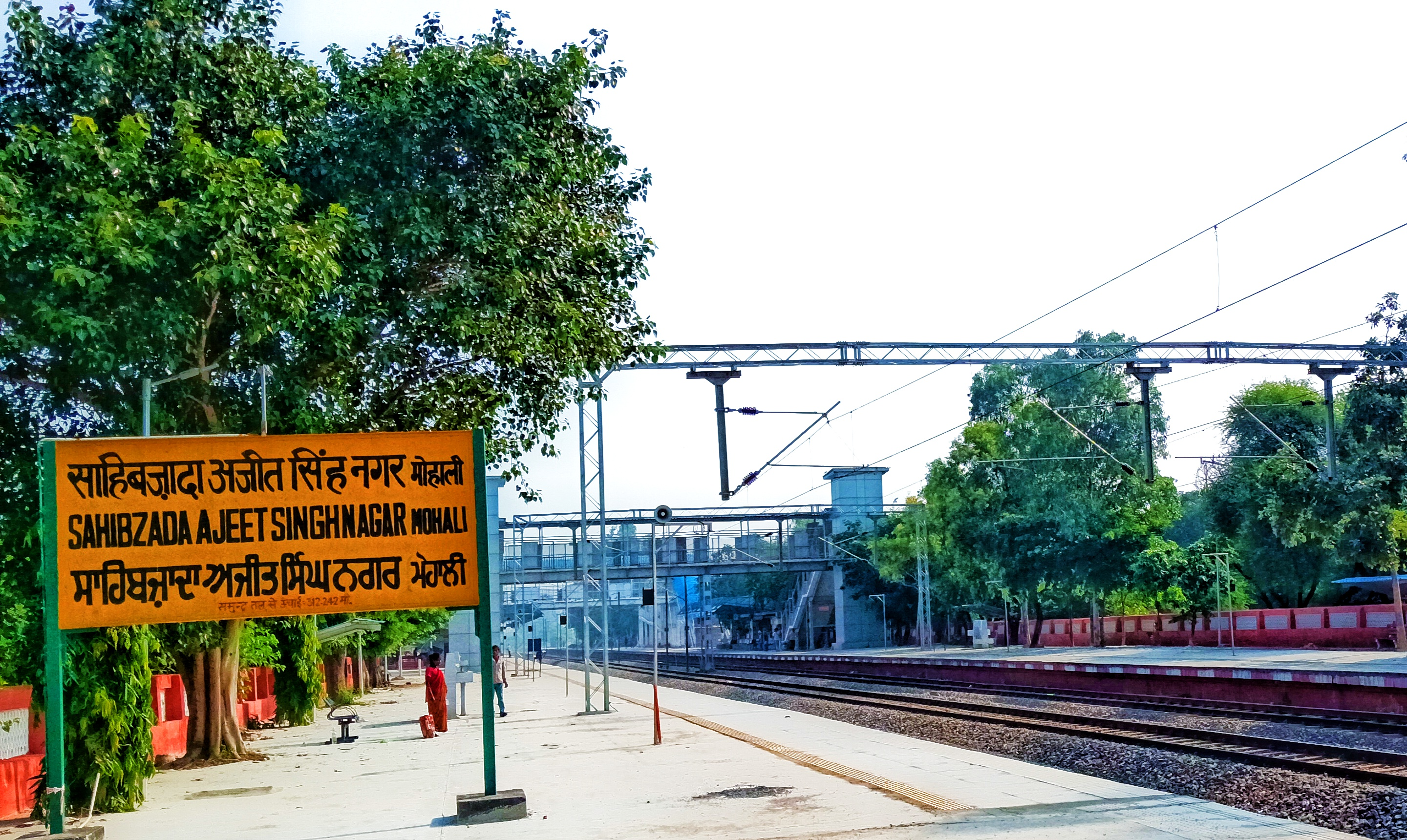
- SAS Nagar Mohali railway station lies between Chandigarh–Sahnewal line

Overview
- Status: Operational
- Owner: Indian Railways
- Locale: Punjab
- Termini: Chandigarh; Sahnewal

Service
- System: Electric-operated
- Operator(s): Northern Railway

History
- Opened: 2013

Technical
- Track length: 97 km (60 mi)
- Number of tracks: 1 (Single line)
- Track gauge: 5 ft 6 in (1,676 mm) broad gauge
- Electrification: 25 kV 50 Hz AC OHLE in 2013
- Highest elevation: Chandigarh 330.77 m (1,085 ft), Sahnewal 260 m (853 ft)

The Chandigarh–Sahnewal line (also referred to as the Chandigarh–Ludhiana line) is a railway line connecting Chandigarh and Sahnewal, the latter in the Indian state of the Punjab. The line is under the administrative jurisdiction of Northern Railway.

== History ==
The 112 km-long project for linking Chandigarh and Ludhiana directly was completed in three phases. The first phase linking Chandigarh and New Morinda on the Sirhind–Nangal line was opened in September 2006. The second phase for the addition of third line between Sahnewal and Ludhiana on the Ambala–Attari line was completed in November 2012. The third phase linking New Morinda with Ludhiana was completed in April 2013.

== Electrification ==
The Chandigarh–Ludhiana sector is electrified. As per the Central Organisation for Railway Electrification, as on 1.4.2012, 43 km had been completed and 69 km were left.

== Passenger movement ==
Chandigarh is the only station on this line which is amongst the top hundred booking stations of Indian Railway.

== Railway reorganisation ==
Northern Railway was formed in 1952 with a portion of East Indian Railway Company west of Mughalsarai, Jodhpur Railway, Bikaner Railway and Eastern Punjab Railway.

== Trains ==
The 12241/12242 Amritsar–Chandigarh Superfast Express was introduced on the new line in 2013. 14504 Shri Mata Vaishno Devi Katra–Kalka Express 12412 Amritsar–Chandigarh Intercity Express
