= Fatehgarh Sahib railway station =

Train station in Punjab, India

Fatehgarh Sahib
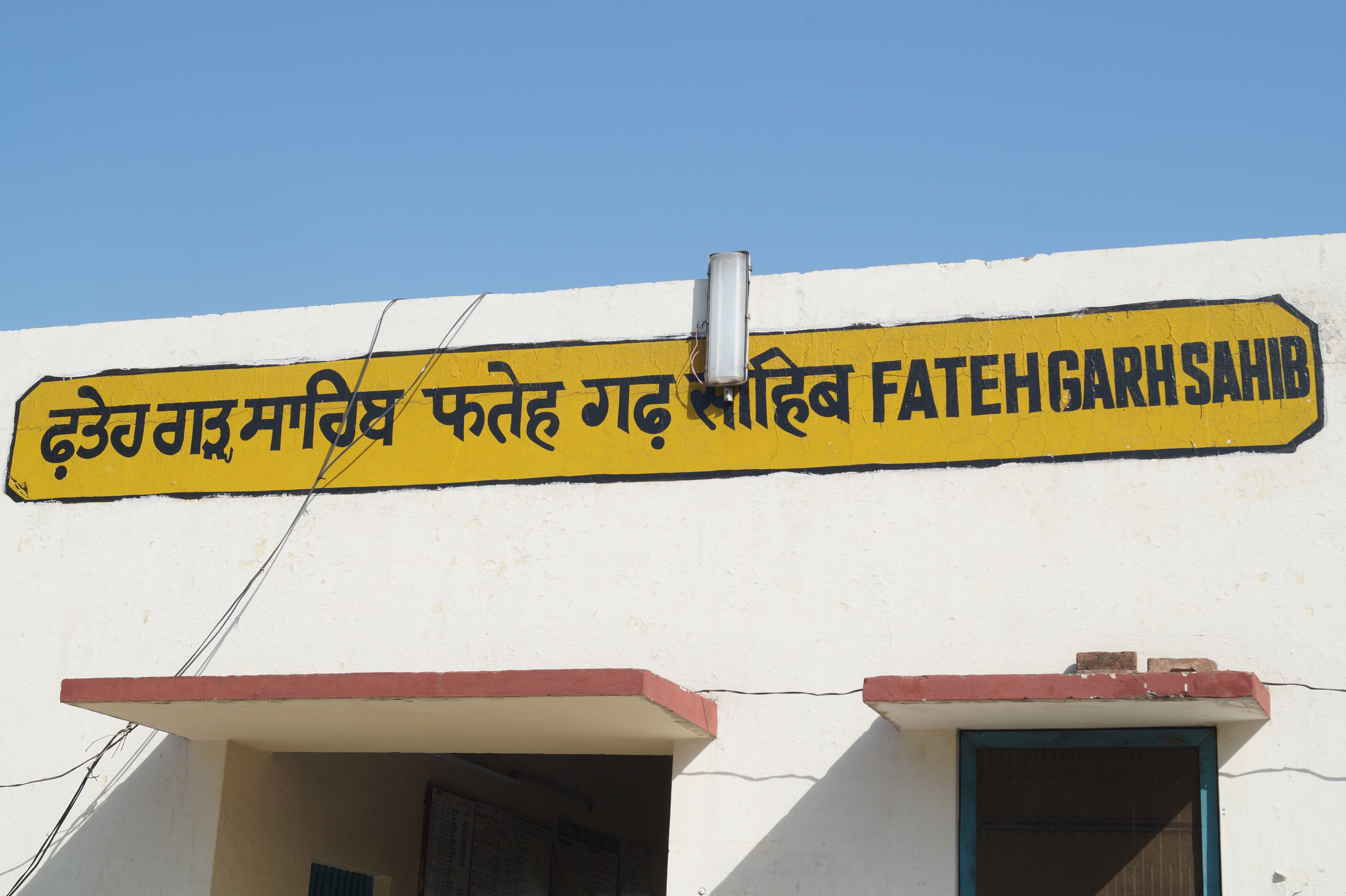

General information
- Location: Station Rd, Opp. Mata Gujri College, Fatehgarh Sahib district, Punjab; India
- Coordinates: 30°39′04″N 76°23′19″E
- Elevation: 268.07 metres (879.5 ft)
- System: Indian Railways
- Owner: Indian Railways
- Operator: Northern Railway
- Line: Sirhind–Una-Mukerian line
- Platforms: 1
- Tracks: 5 ft 6 in (1,676 mm) broad gauge

Construction
- Structure type: Standard on ground
- Parking: Yes

Other information
- Status: Functioning
- Station code: FGSB
- Division(s): Ambala

History
- Opened: 1927
Location
- Location within Punjab

Fatehgarh Sahib (station code: FGSB) is a small railway station located in Fatehgarh Sahib district in the Indian state of Punjab and serves Fatehgarh Sahib city which is the administrative headquarter of the district. Fatehgarh Sahib station falls under Ambala railway division of Northern Railway zone of Indian Railways.

== The railway station ==
Fatehgarh Sahib railway station is located at an elevation of 268.07 metres (879.5 ft). This station is located on the single track, 5 ft 6 in (1,676 mm) broad gauge, Sirhind–Nangal line. Station was established in 1927 when Sirhind to Nangal line was opened.

== Electrification ==
Fatehgarh Sahib railway station line is electrified. Sections of Sirhind–Nangal line were completed and energized at various times between 1999 and 2001 and complete line from Sirhind to Nangal was tested and inspected by CRS on 24 April 2001.

== Amenities ==
Fatehgarh Sahib railway station has two booking windows and all basic amenities like drinking water, public toilets, sheltered area with adequate seating. There is one platform at the station.
