= Tarn Taran Junction railway station =

Train station in Punjab, India

Tarn Taran Jn.

General information
- Location: Station Rd, Tarn Taran, Tarn Taran district, Punjab; India
- Coordinates: 31°27′19″N 74°55′56″E
- Elevation: 226 metres (741 ft)
- System: Indian Railway
- Owner: Indian Railways
- Operator: Northern Railway
- Lines: Amritsar–Khemkaran line Beas–Tarn Taran line
- Platforms: 1
- Tracks: 5 ft 6 in (1,676 mm) broad gauge

Construction
- Structure type: Standard on ground
- Parking: Yes

Other information
- Status: Functioning
- Station code: TTO
- Division(s): Firozpur
Location
- Location within Punjab Location within India

Tarn Taran Junction (station code: TTO) is a railway station located in Tarn Taran district in the Indian state of Punjab and serves Tarn Taran Sahib city. Tarn Taran station falls under Firozpur railway division of Northern Railway zone of Indian Railways.

== The railway station ==
Tarn Taran railway station is at an elevation of 226 metres (741 ft) and was assigned the station code – TTO. This station is located on the single track, 5 ft 6 in (1,676 mm) broad gauge, Amritsar–Khemkaran line. It is also terminal station on Beas–Tarn Taran line. It is well connected to a number of major cities via Amritsar and Beas railway stations.

== Electrification ==
Tarn Taran Junction railway station tracks are electrified.

== Amenities ==
Tarn Taran railway station has booking window and all basic amenities like drinking water, public toilets, sheltered area with adequate seating. There is one platform at the station.
