= Ludhiana Junction railway station =

Railway station in Punjab, India

Ludhiana Junction
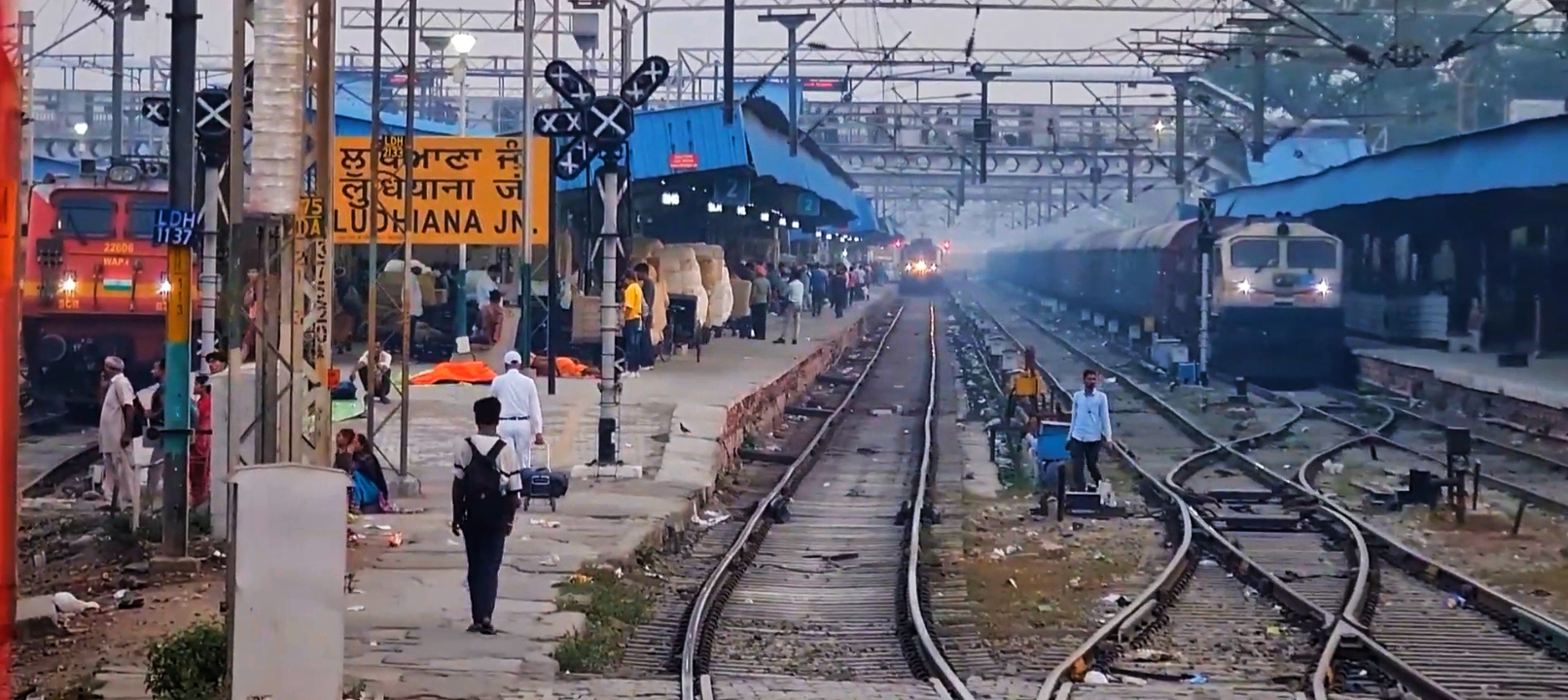
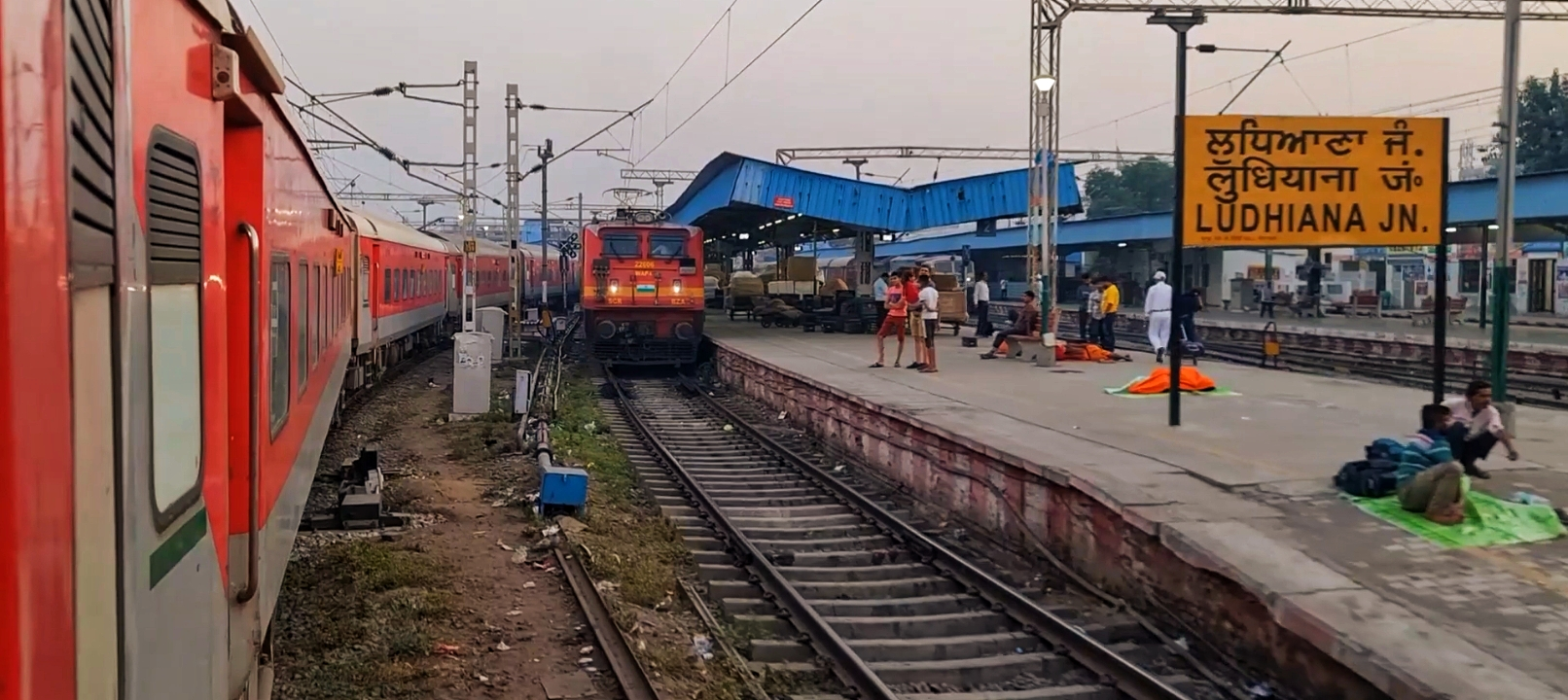
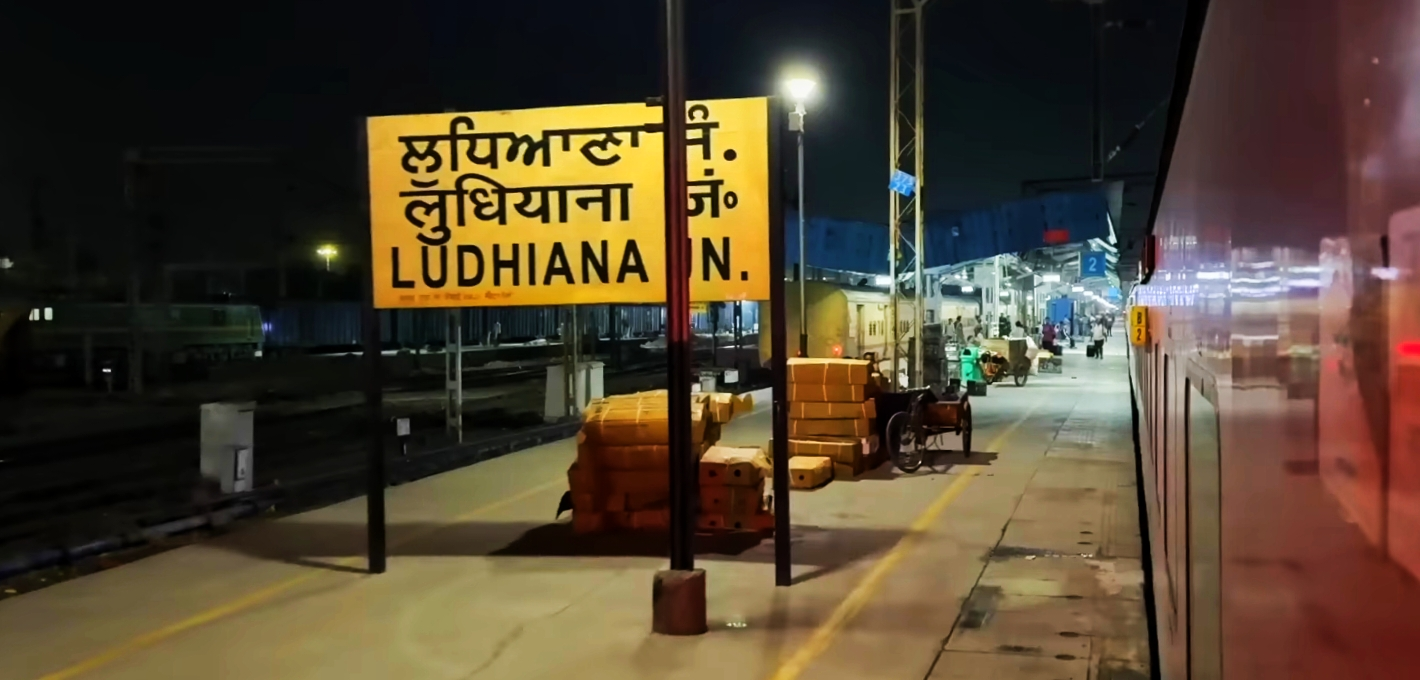
- Ludhiana Junction

General information
- Location: Kamla Nehru Market, Old Ludhiana, Ludhiana, Punjab 141001; India
- Coordinates: 30°54′43″N 75°50′53″E
- Elevation: 246 metres (807 ft)
- System: Indian Railways
- Owner: Indian Railways
- Operator: Northern Railways
- Lines: Ambala–Attari line, Ludhiana–Fazilka line, Ludhiana–Jakhal line, Ludhiana–Chandigarh line
- Platforms: 7
- Tracks: 18 5 ft 6 in (1,676 mm) broad gauge

Construction
- Structure type: At grade
- Parking: Yes
- Cycle facilities: No
- Accessible: Available

Other information
- Status: Functioning
- Station code: LDH
- Zone(s): Northern Railway
- Division(s): Firozpur

History
- Opened: 1864; 162 years ago
- Electrified: 1996–97

Services
| Preceding station | Indian Railways | Following station |
|---|---|---|
| Ladhowal towards ? | Northern Railway zone Ambala–Attari line | Dhandari Kalan towards ? |
| Terminus | Northern Railway zone Ludhiana–Fazilka line | Model Gram towards ? |
| Terminus | Northern Railway zone Ludhinana–Jakhal line | Gill towards ? |
Location
- Location within Punjab Location within India
- Interactive map

Ludhiana Junction railway station (station code: LDH) is a railway station located in Ludhiana district in the Indian state of Punjab and serves Ludhiana. It is located in about the centre of the city and is among the busiest railway stations of Punjab. It is also among the cleanest of railway stations of India. This railway station is taken up for being upgraded to model railway station by Railways Department, Government of India.

== The railway station ==
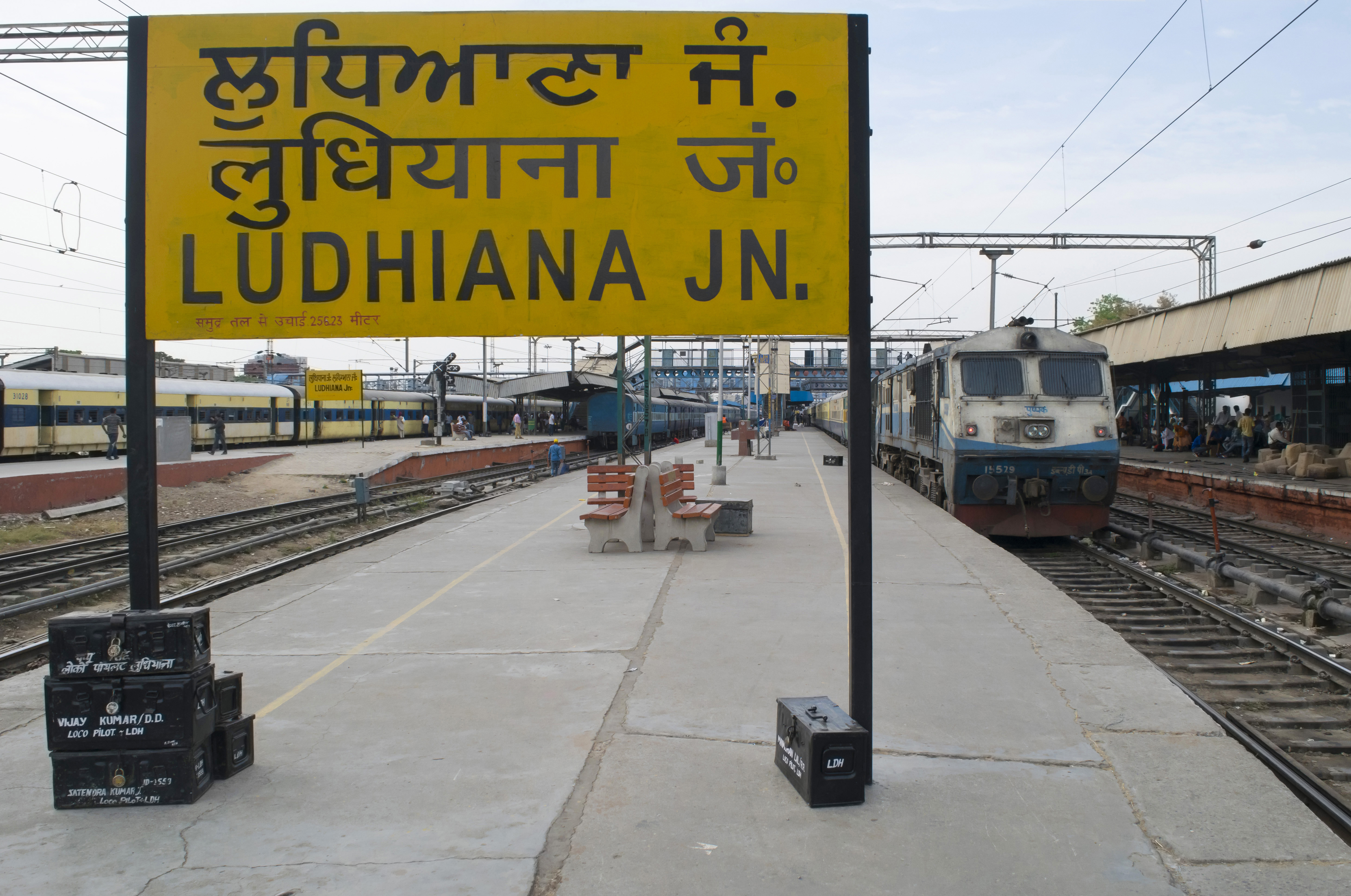
Nameboard of Ludhiana Railway Station on PF4

Ludhiana railway station is at an elevation of 246 metres (807 ft) and was assigned the code – LDH.

== History ==
The Scinde, Punjab & Delhi Railway completed the 483 km (300 mi)-long Amritsar–Ambala Cantt – Saharanpur–Meerut–Ghaziabad line in 1870 connecting Multan (now in Pakistan) with Delhi.

The Ludhiana–Jakhal line was laid in 1901, possibly by the Southern Punjab Railway Co.

The extension from the Macleodganj (later renamed Mandi Sadiqganj and now in Pakistan) railway line to Ludhiana was opened by the Southern Punjab Railway Company in 1905.

The Sahnewal–Chandigarh rail link (also referred to as Ludhiana–Chandigarh rail link) was inaugurated in 2013.

== Electrification ==
The Mandi Gobindgarh-Ludhiana sector was electrified in 1996–97.

== Loco sheds ==
Diesel Loco Shed, Ludhiana holds 184+ locos including WDM-2, WDM-3A and WDG-3A/WDG-4D. Ludhiana Electric Loco Shed was commissioned in 2001 and houses WAG-5 (now transferred to other sheds), WAG-7, WAG-9 and WAP-4 (now transferred to TKD DLS) locos.

== Passenger movement ==
Ludhiana is amongst the top hundred booking stations of Indian Railways.
