= Ladhowal railway station =

Railway station in Punjab, India

Ladhowal Railway Station

General information
- Location: NH 1, Ladhowal, Jalandhar district, Punjab; India
- Coordinates: 30°58′40″N 75°47′48″E
- Elevation: 242 metres (794 ft)
- System: Indian Railways station
- Owner: Indian Railways
- Operator: Northern Railway
- Platforms: 2
- Tracks: 3

Construction
- Structure type: Standard (on-ground station)
- Parking: No
- Cycle facilities: No
- Accessible: No

Other information
- Status: Double electric line
- Station code: LDW
- Zone(s): Northern Railway
- Division(s): Firozpur
Location

Ladhowal railway station is a small railway station in Ludhiana district, Punjab. Its code is LDW. It serves Ladhowal town. The station consists of two platforms. The platforms are not well sheltered. It lacks many facilities including water and sanitation.
