= Naya Nangal railway station =

Railway station in Rupnagar district, India

General information
- Location: Rupnagar district, Punjab; India
- Coordinates: 31.3788°N 76.3496°E
- Elevation: 359 metres (1,178 ft)
- System: Indian Railways station
- Owner: Indian Railways
- Platforms: 1
- Tracks: 2
- Connections: Auto stand

Construction
- Structure type: Standard (on-ground station)
- Parking: No
- Cycle facilities: No

Other information
- Status: Functioning
- Station code: NNGL
- Zone(s): Northern Railway
- Division(s): Ambala
Location

Naya Nangal railway station is a small railway station in Rupnagar district, Punjab. Its code is NNGL. It serves Naya Nangal city. The station consists of two platforms. The existing platforms are undergoing development and many sanitation and water facilities are also being provided on the platforms. The station is connected by a broad-gauge railway line, which is the only railway line in the Himachal Pradesh.

== Major trains ==
- Himachal Express
- Amb Andaura–Ambala DMU
- Amb Andaura–Nangal Dam Passenger
