= Nangal Dam railway station =

Railway station in Punjab, India

Nangal Dam Railway Station
- Indian Railways logo

General information
- Location: Railway Station Road, Nangal, Rupnagar district, Punjab; India
- Coordinates: 31.3708°N 76.3735°E
- Elevation: 355 metres (1,165 ft)
- System: Indian Railways station
- Owner: Indian Railways
- Operator: Northern Railway
- Line: Sirhind-Una railway line
- Platforms: 3
- Tracks: 4

Construction
- Structure type: Standard (on-ground station)
- Parking: Yes
- Cycle facilities: Yes

Other information
- Status: Single Track Electrified
- Station code: NLDM
- Zone(s): Northern Railway zone
- Division(s): Ambala
Location
- Location within Punjab Location within India

Nangal Dam railway station is a railway station in Rupnagar district, Punjab. Its code is NLDM. It serves Nangal, Nangal Township and Naya Nangal town.

== Trains ==
- Nangal Dam–Amb Andaura Passenger
- Nangal Dam–Ambala Passenger
- Gurumukhi Superfast Express
- Saharanpur–Nangal Dam MEMU
