= Ghaggar railway station =

Railway station in Mohali, Punjab, India

Ghaggar Railway Station
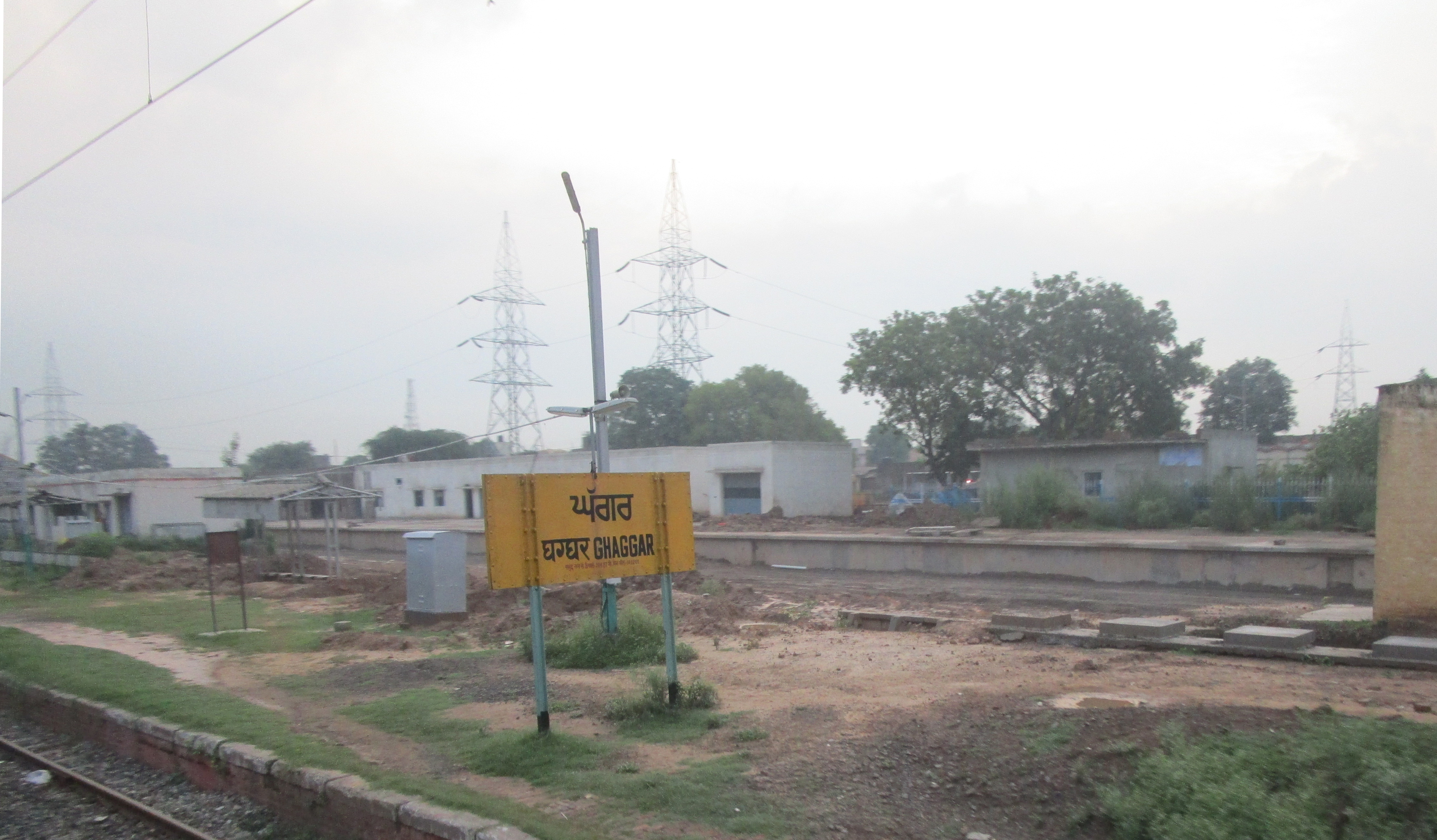

General information
- Location: Derabassi-Ramgarh Road, Mubarakpur Ghaggar Mohali, Punjab; India
- Coordinates: 30.6274°N 76.8471°E
- Elevation: 301 metres (988 ft)
- System: Indian Railways station
- Owner: Indian Railways
- Operator: Northern Railway
- Platforms: 2
- Tracks: 4 (construction – doubling of diesel broad gauge)
- Connections: Auto stand

Construction
- Structure type: Standard (on ground station)
- Parking: Yes
- Cycle facilities: Yes

Other information
- Status: Functioning
- Station code: GHG
- Zone(s): Northern Railway
- Division(s): Ambala

Services
Preceding station	Indian Railways	Following station
Dappar towards ?	Northern Railway zone Mohali Ludhiana Line	Chandigarh Junction towards ?
Location
- Location within Punjab Location within India

Ghaggar railway station is a small railway station in Mohali district, Punjab. Its code is GHG. It serves Ghaggar town near Derabassi and Zirakpur The station consists of two platforms. The platforms are well sheltered. It has good facilities including water and sanitation.

== Trains ==
Some of the trains that run from Ghaggar are:

- Kalka–Delhi Passenger (unreserved)
- Ambala–Nangal Dam Passenger (unreserved)
- Amb Andaura–Ambala DMU
- Kalka–Ambala Passenger (unreserved)
