= Sangat railway station =

Train station in Punjab, India

Sangat Railway Station

General information
- Location: Station Rd., Sangat, Bathinda, Punjab; India
- Coordinates: 30°05′26″N 74°50′07″E
- Elevation: 203 metres (666 ft)
- System: Indian Railway
- Owner: Indian Railways
- Operator: North Western
- Line: Jodhpur–Bathinda line
- Platforms: 2
- Tracks: 3 nos 5 ft 6 in (1,676 mm) broad gauge

Construction
- Structure type: Standard on ground
- Parking: Yes
- Accessible: Wheelchair cum pedestrian ramp

Other information
- Status: Functioning
- Station code: SGF
- Division(s): Bikaner

Passengers
- 2018: 228 per day
Location
- Location within Punjab Location within India

Sangat Railway Station (station code: SGF) is located in Bathinda district in the Indian state of Punjab and serves Sangat town and nearby villages. Sangat mandi is a commercial hub for agricultural produce in the area. Sangat station falls under Bikaner railway division of North Western Railway zone of Indian Railways.

== Overview ==
Sangat railway station is located at an elevation of 203.116 metres (666.39 ft). This station is located on the single track, 5 ft 6 in (1,676 mm) broad gauge, Jodhpur–Bathinda line which was established in 1902.

== Electrification ==
Sangat railway station is situated on single track electrified Suratgarh–Bathinda line. It was reported in February 2020 that the electrification of the single track BG Suratgarh–Bathinda line was in progress. The station photographs show three electrified tracks.

== Amenities ==
Sangat railway station has 1 booking window, no enquiry office and basic amenities like drinking water, public toilets, sheltered area with adequate seating etc. The station had small a footfall of 228 persons per day in 2018. wheelchair availability was not there for disabled persons. There are two platforms at the station but no foot overbridge (FOB).
