= Sahnewal railway station =

Railway station in Punjab, India

Sahnewal Sanehwal Junction
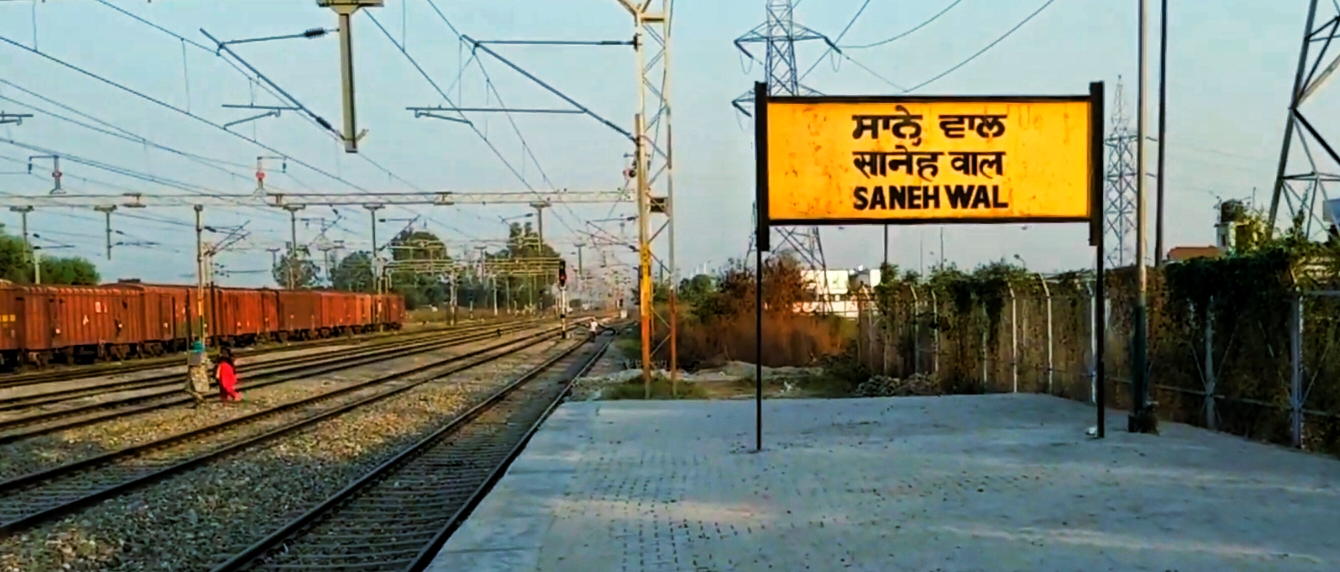
- Sanehwal Junction Railway Station

General information
- Location: Ludhiana–Ambala Road, Sahnewal, Punjab; India
- Coordinates: 30°50′18″N 75°58′45″E
- Elevation: 260 metres (850 ft)
- System: Indian Railways junction station
- Owner: Indian Railways
- Operator: Northern Railway
- Lines: Ambala–Attari line Chandigarh–Sahnewal line
- Platforms: 3
- Tracks: 8 nos 5 ft 6 in (1,676 mm) broad gauge

Construction
- Structure type: Standard on ground
- Parking: Yes
- Cycle facilities: No

Other information
- Status: Functioning
- Station code: SNL
- Division(s): Firozpur

History
- Opened: 1870
- Electrified: 1996–97

Passengers
- 2018: 319 per day

Services
Preceding station	Indian Railways	Following station
Doraha towards ?	Northern Railway zone Ambala–Attari line	Dhandari Kalan towards ?
Lal Kalan towards ?	Northern Railway zone Chandigarh–Sahnewal line	Terminus
Location
- Location within Punjab Location within India

Sahnewal Junction railway station is located in Ludhiana district in the Indian state of Punjab and serves Sahnewal. Sahnewal station falls under Firozpur railway division under Northern Railway zone of Indian Railways.

== The railway station ==
Sahnewal railway station is at an elevation of 260 metres (850 ft) and was assigned the code – SNL.

== History ==
The Scinde, Punjab & Delhi Railway completed the 483 km (300 mi)-long Amritsar–Ambala–Saharanpur–Ghaziabad line in 1870 connecting Multan (now in Pakistan) with Delhi.

The Sahnewal–Chandigarh rail link (also referred to as Ludhiana–Chandigarh rail link) was inaugurated in 2013.

== Electrification ==
The Mandi Gobindgarh–Ludhiana sector was electrified in 1996–97.

== Amenities ==
Sanehwal Junction railway station has 1 booking window and no enquiry office. Station is classified under the lowest NSG6 category and has only basic amenities like drinking water, public toilets, sheltered area with adequate seating. Wheelchair availability is not there for disabled persons. There are three platforms at the station and one foot overbridge (FOB).
