= Amritsar–Pathankot line =

Railway line in Punjab, India

Amritsar–Pathankot Line (including Dera Baba Nanak branch line)
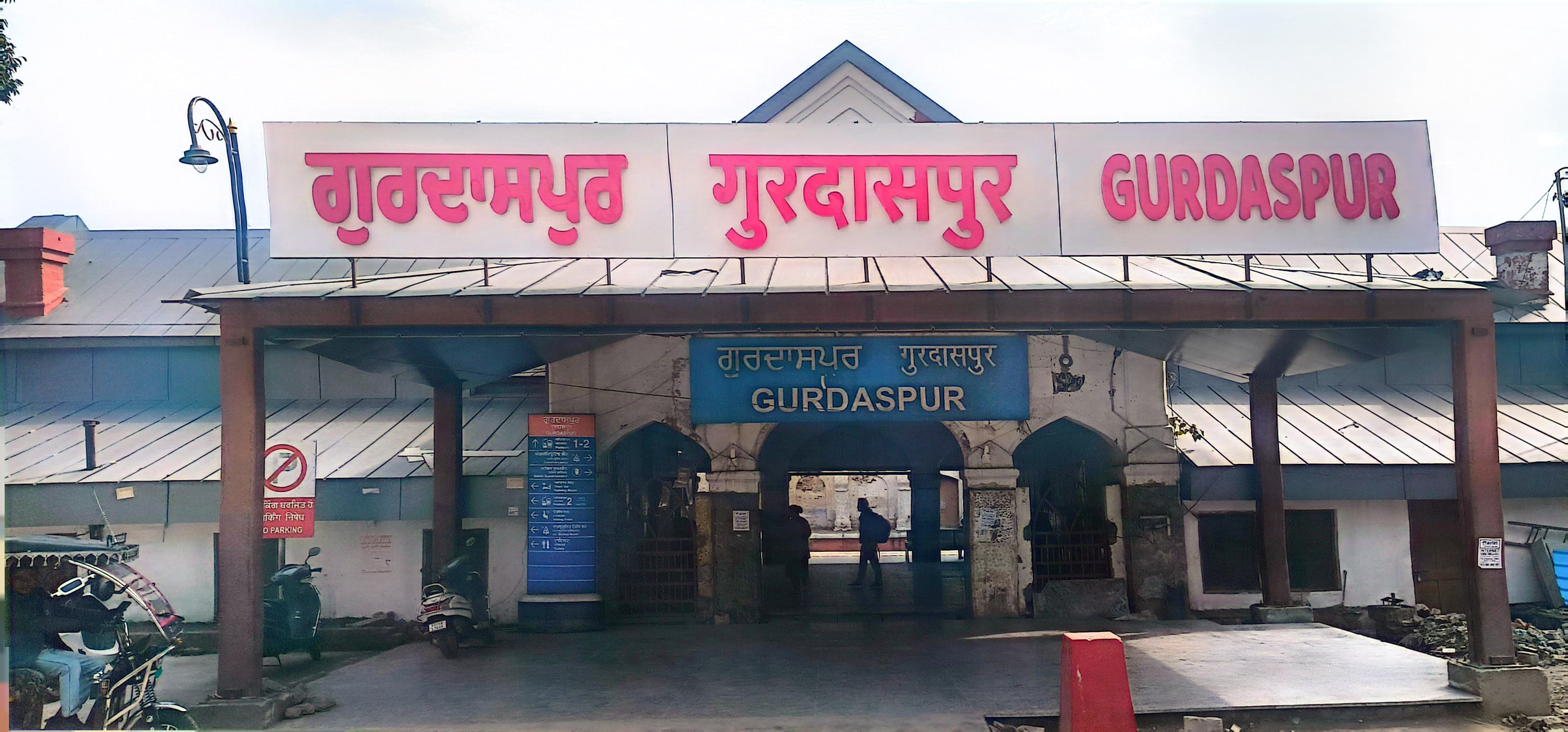

Overview
- Status: Operational
- Owner: Indian Railways
- Locale: Punjab
- Termini: Amritsar; Pathankot Junction

Service
- System: Electrified
- Operator: Northern Railway

History
- Opened: 1884

Technical
- Track length: 108.9 km (68 mi)
- Number of tracks: 1 (Single line)
- Track gauge: 5 ft 6 in (1,676 mm) broad gauge
- Electrification: 2018
- Highest elevation: Amritsar 236 m (774 ft), Pathankot Junction 352 m (1,155 ft)

The Amritsar–Pathankot line is a railway line connecting Amritsar and Pathankot Junction both in the Indian state of Punjab. The line is under the administrative jurisdiction of Northern Railway.

== History ==
The 108.9 km (68 mi)-long 1,676 mm (5 ft 6 in)-wide 5 ft 6 in (1,676 mm) broad gauge Amritsar–Pathankot line was opened in 1884. It originally belonged to the local government and was transferred to North Western Railway in 1892. The Amritsar–Dera Baba Nanak branch line serves the western part of Batala tehsil. Prior to the partition of India in 1947, this line was 225.9 km (140 mi) long and was linked to Sialkot (now in Pakistan), but after partition Dera Baba Nanak became the terminus. The Batala–Qadian link serves the eastern part of Batala tehsil. The 225.9 km (140 mi) long Amritsar–Sialkot line ran thus: Amritsar–Dera Baba Nanak–Narowal–Sialkot, crossing the 1.024 km (1 mi) long Ravi River Bridge.

As of 2013, the Lahore–Narowal–Sialkot railway line passes near the India–Pakistan border through the western outskirts of Narowal, just opposite Dera Baba Nanak, before turning north-westwards to Pasrur and Sialkot.

During the 2015 Gurdaspur attack, disaster was averted on this line as a railway lineman, Ashwani Saini, noticed a bomb on the track and alerted the authorities before the next train arrived. He also ran down the line waving a red flag to alert the driver of the next train to stop. The train that was due to traverse this track, with more than 270 people on board, stopped only a hundred yards from the bomb.

== Importance ==
This line is strategically very important. It connects three border districts of Punjab with each other namely Amritsar, Gurdaspur and Pathankot. This lines provides a diversion or substitute route to Jalandhar–Jammu line. Whenever this track gets interrupted either due to any protest or a technical/mechanical work, then most of the trains get diverted via Amritsar–Gurdaspur to Pathankot and further to Jammu and vice versa. This line can also play a strategic role and help military movement in war conditions. The important stations on this line are Amritsar, Batala, Gurdaspur & Pathankot. Other landmark stoppages are Verka, Dhariwal and Dinanagar.

== Railway workshop ==
Amritsar railway workshop carries out periodic overhaul of WDS-4 locos and breakdown cranes and bogie manufacture.

== Passenger movement ==
Amritsar is the only station on this line which is amongst the top hundred booking stations of Indian Railway.

== Railway reorganisation ==
Sind Railway (later reorganised as Scinde, Punjab & Delhi Railway) was formed a guaranteed railway in 1856. It constructed broad-gauge railways from Delhi to Multan via Lahore, and from Karachi to Kotri. Multan and Kotri were connected by ferry service on the Indus River. In 1871–72, Indus Valley Railway was formed to connect Multan and Kotri. At the same time, Punjab Northern State Railway started constructing from Lahore towards Peshawar. In 1886, Sind, Punjab and Delhi Railway was acquired by the state and amalgamated with Indus Valley Railway and Punjab Northern State Railway to form North Western State Railway.

With the partition of India in 1947, North Western Railway was split. While the western portion became Pakistan West Railway, and later Pakistan Railways, the eastern part became Eastern Punjab Railway. In 1952, Northern Railway was formed with a portion of East Indian Railway Company west of Mughalsarai, Jodhpur Railway, Bikaner Railway and Eastern Punjab Railway.
