= Dappar railway station =

Railway station in Punjab

General information
- Location: SAS Nagar District, Punjab; India
- Coordinates: 30.5175°N 76.8075°E
- Elevation: 305 metres (1,001 ft)
- Owner: Indian Railways
- Operator: Northern Railway zone
- Line: Delhi–Kalka line
- Platforms: 2

Construction
- Structure type: Standard on ground

Other information
- Status: Functioning
- Station code: DHPR
- Zone(s): Northern Railway zone
- Division(s): Ambala

Services
Preceding station	Indian Railways	Following station
Lalru towards ?	Northern Railway zone	Ghaggar towards ?
Location
- Location within India Location within Punjab

Dappar railway station is a railway station located in Sahibzada Ajit Singh Nagar district, Punjab. The railway station is about 11 km from Chandigarh Junction.

== Trains ==
- 14887/14888 Kalka–Barmer Express
- 13008 Udyan Abha Toofan Express
