= Patiala railway station =

Railway station in Punjab, India

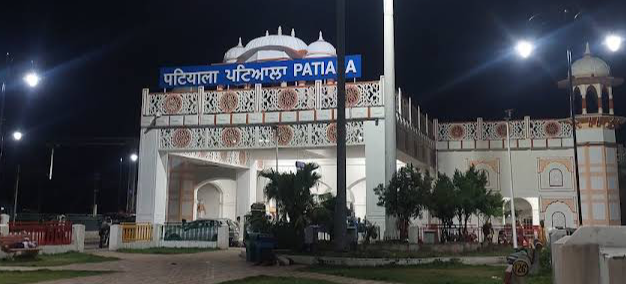
- Patiala Railway Station

General information
- Location: The Mall Road, Patiala; Punjab; India
- Coordinates: 30.3421°N 76.4019°E
- Elevation: 255 metres (837 ft)
- Owner: Ministry of Railways (India)
- Operator: Indian Railways
- Line: RAJPURA - BATHINDA MAIN LINE
- Platforms: 4
- Tracks: 2

Construction
- Structure type: At grade
- Parking: Yes
- Cycle facilities: No
- Accessible: Yes

Other information
- Status: Functioning
- Station code: PTA
- Zone(s): Northern Railway
- Division(s): Ambala
- Fare zone: Northern Railway Zone, Ambala railway division

History
- Opened: 1887
- Electrified: 2019

Services
Lift services
Location

Patiala railway station (station code: PTA) is a railway station serving Patiala city of Punjab in India. It is under Ambala railway division of Northern Railway zone of Indian Railways. It is located at 256 m (840 ft) above sea level and has four platforms. 24 trains stops, one train originates and one train terminates here.

== Proposed Image ==
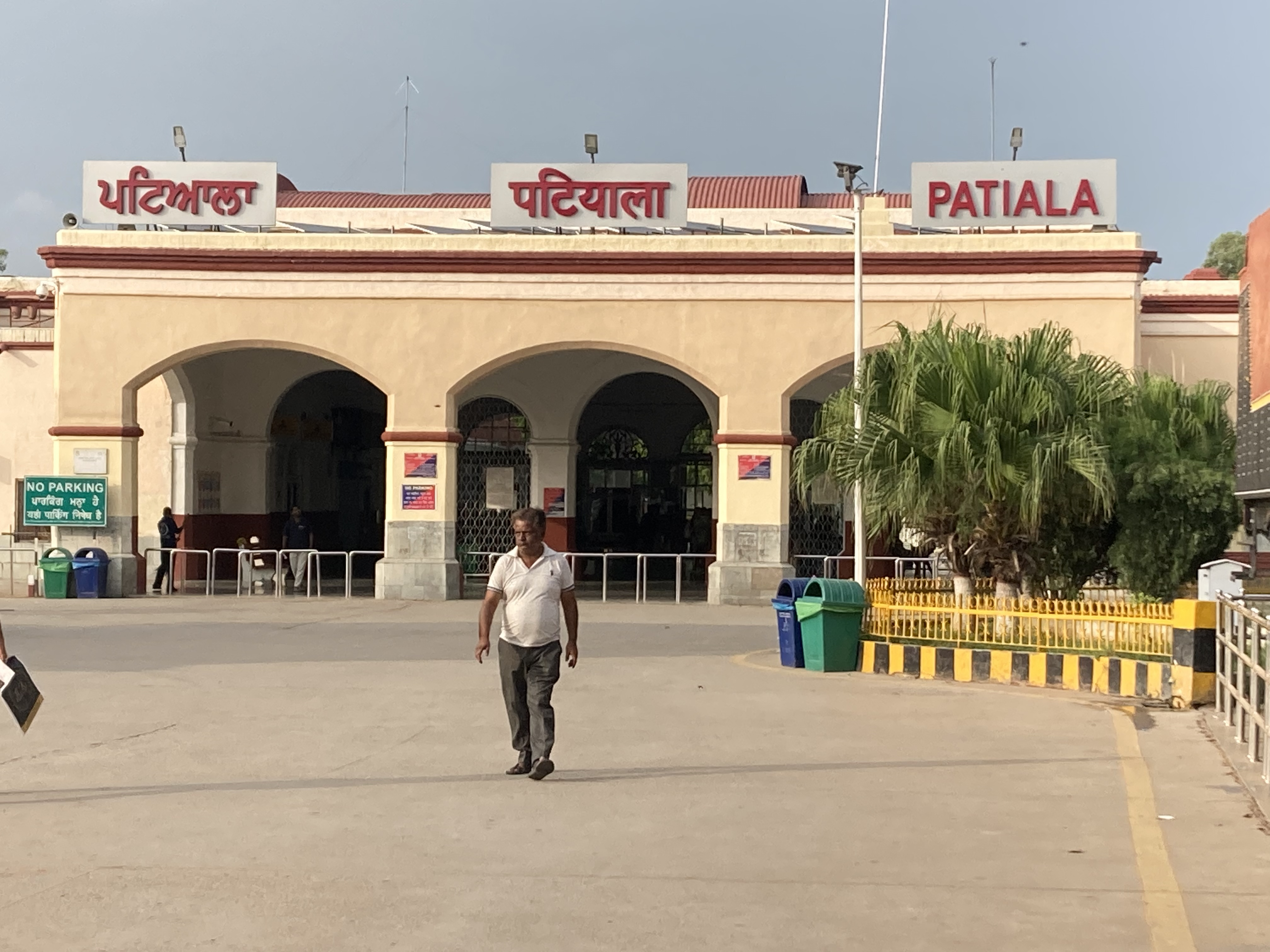

== History ==
Unlike most railway stations, the building of Patiala railway station is perpendicular to the rail line from Rajpura. It is said that Maharaja built the railway station in the perpendicular orientation as he had hoped that one day the Ambala–Ludhiana would be diverted via Patiala, but that never happened. One reason was the trains would have to pay the taxes levied by the Pepsu state.

== Overview ==
The Patiala railway station is located at an elevation of 255 metres (837 ft) and was assigned the code "PTA." Patiala railway station is one of the 400 stations to be redeveloped under Government of India's AMRUT scheme. In 2016, the work for the platform-1 extension is in progress which shall be extended to another 200 meter to accommodate longest possible train. In 2016, electrification of Single broad-gauge railway line was under progress which is executed by Rail Vikas Nigam Ltd.

There are 5 platforms under use, 1(A), 1, 2, 3, 4. Platform number 4 is reserved exclusively for freight and passenger trains of Indian Army.

== Electrification ==
The Rajpura–Patiala–Bathinda sector was electrified in 2019 and doubling is in process. In March 2017, work commenced for doubling of Rajpura–Patiala–Bathinda line, which is also a feeder route for Eastern Dedicated Freight Corridor (EDFC).

== Passenger movement ==
Patiala City is amongst the top hundred booking stations of Indian Railway.

== Amenities ==
Patiala City railway station has computerized reservation counters, GRP (railway police) office, retiring rooms, vegetarian and non-vegetarian refreshment rooms and book stall.

== Railway workshop ==
Patiala railway workshop carries out a periodic overhaul of WDS-4 locos and breakdown cranes and locomotive manufacture.
