= Beas Junction railway station =

Railway station in Punjab, India

Beas Junction
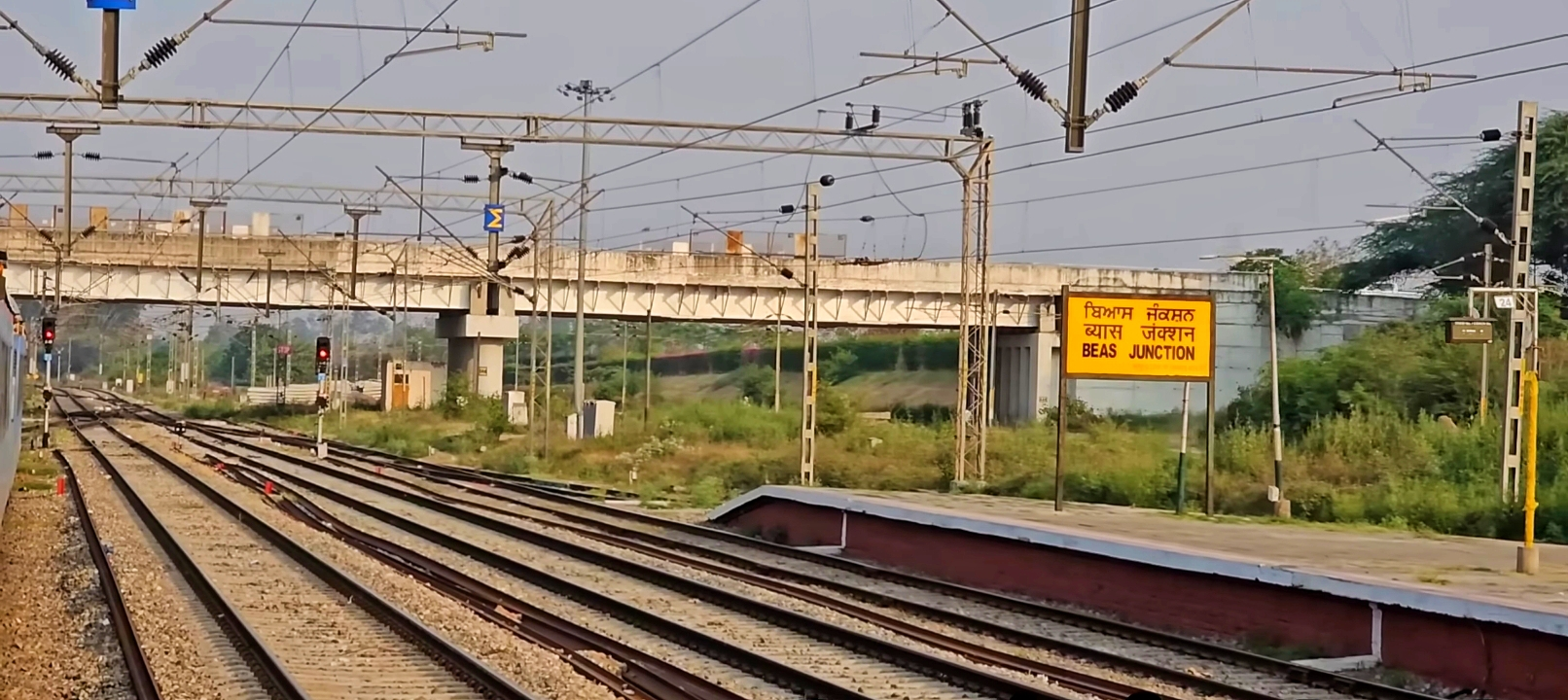
- Beas Junction

General information
- Location: Dera Road, Beas, Amritsar district, Punjab; India
- Coordinates: 31°31′13″N 75°17′29″E
- Elevation: 233 metres (764 ft)
- System: Indian Railways – junction
- Owner: Indian Railways
- Operator: Northern Railway
- Lines: Ambala–Attari line Beas–Tarn Taran line
- Platforms: 2
- Tracks: 4 nos – 5 ft 6 in (1,676 mm) broad gauge

Construction
- Structure type: At grade
- Parking: Yes
- Cycle facilities: Yes
- Accessible: Wheelchair ramp

Other information
- Status: Functioning
- Station code: BEAS
- Zone(s): Northern Railway
- Division(s): Firozpur

Passengers
- 2018: 5500/day
Location
- Location within Punjab

Beas Junction Railway Station is located in Amritsar district serving the town of Beas, in Punjab, North India. It is under the Firozpur railway division of the Northern Railway Zone of Indian Railways. It bags the award for the cleanest Railway Station in India.

== Overview ==
Beas Junction railway station is located at an elevation of 233 metres (764 ft) and was assigned the code – BEAS. As of 2016, 104 trains have stopped at this station. The station is 237 meters above sea level. Several trains pass through Beas Junction, including the No. 19225 Bhagat ki Kothi–Jammu Tawi Express and the 18508 Hirakund Express. The closest airport to Beas railway station is Sri Guru Ram Das Jee International Airport (IATA: ATQ, ICAO: VIAR), also known as Raja Sansi Airport, at a distance of 51.08 km (31.74 miles). The next closest airport to the station is Pathankot Airport, at a distance of 85.74 km (53.28 miles).

== Electrification ==
Beas railway station is situated on double-track electrified line. There are four electrified tracks at the station.

== Amenities ==
Beas railway station has fourteen booking window and an enquiry office. There are basic amenities like drinking water, public toilets, sheltered area with adequate seating. There are two platforms at the station and two foot overbridges (FOB). Charitable trust Integrated Action Trust(INTACT) had awarded this station with Environmental Management System ISO 14001: 2015 Certificate. INTACT also rated the railway station as the cleanest and public friendly one in India. To get this honour there is big hand from volunteers from Radha Soami Satsang Beas, who helped in improvements to the amenities and circulation areas of the railway station.

== See also ==
- List of railway stations in Punjab
