= Morinda Junction railway station =

Railway station in Punjab, India

Morinda Junction
- Indian Railways logo

General information
- Location: Morinda city road, Morinda, Rupnagar district, Punjab; India
- Coordinates: 30.79°N 76.5°E
- Elevation: 285 metres (935 ft)
- System: Express train and Passenger train station
- Owner: Indian Railways
- Operator: Northern Railways
- Line: Una-Sirhind Una-Chandigarh
- Platforms: 2
- Tracks: 3

Construction
- Structure type: Standard (on ground station)
- Parking: Yes

Other information
- Status: Functioning
- Station code: MRND
- Zone(s): Northern Railway zone
- Division(s): Ambala

History
- Opened: 1927
Location
- Location within Punjab Location within India

Morinda Junction railway station (station code:- MRND) is in Rupnagar district of Punjab state. It is fall under Northern Railway zone's Ambala railway division. It is single line electrified.

The Morinda railway station is located on Morinda city road (Connecting Chandigarh and Ludhiana). This benefits local businesses, enabling the town development and expansion. Today, Morinda grows at a faster rate than its neighbouring towns. A lot of industries of nearby towns.
