= Bakkar =

- Written by: Amr Samir Atef
- Directed by: Mona Mohamed Abulnasr (منى محمد أبوالنصر); Sherif Gamal (شريف جمال)
- Starring: Bakkar
- Country of origin: Egypt
- Original language: Egyptian Arabic
- No. of seasons: 11
- No. of episodes: 280

Production
- Running time: 15–17 minutes

Original release
- Network: Egyptian Television Channel One
- Release: 1998 – 2016

Bakkar (Arabic: بكار) is an Egyptian cartoon series that was produced by the Egyptian Radio and Television Union to be aired on Channel One and was traditionally broadcast during the Muslim holy month of Ramadan from 1998 to 2006, and from 2015 to 2016, running for 12 to 30 episodes of the 11 seasons.

The series revolves around the adventures of a young Nubian-Egyptian boy named Bakkar, his pet goat Rashida, and his friends. It was written by Amr Samir Serif, and directed by Mona Abul-Nasr. The opening and closing songs are by famed Nubian-Egyptian singer Mohammed Mounir, and written by longtime collaborator Kawthar Mostafa. Sherif Nour is one of the composers.

== Legacy ==
A number of episodes can now be watched on the ERTU Maspero Atfal YouTube Channel. as well as via the Google Play app store.

== Episodes ==
=== 2D Episodes (1998 – 2006) ===
2D Episodes (1998 – 2006)
Season	Episodes	Originally released (Egypt)
1	12	1998
2	28	1999
3	30	2000
4	30	2001
5	30	2002
6	30	2003
7	30	2004
8	30	2005
9	30	2006

=== 3D Episodes (2015 – 2016) ===
Season	Episodes	Originally released (Egypt)
1	30	2015
2	30	2016
