= Amritsar Junction railway station =

Railway station in the Indian state of Punjab

Amritsar
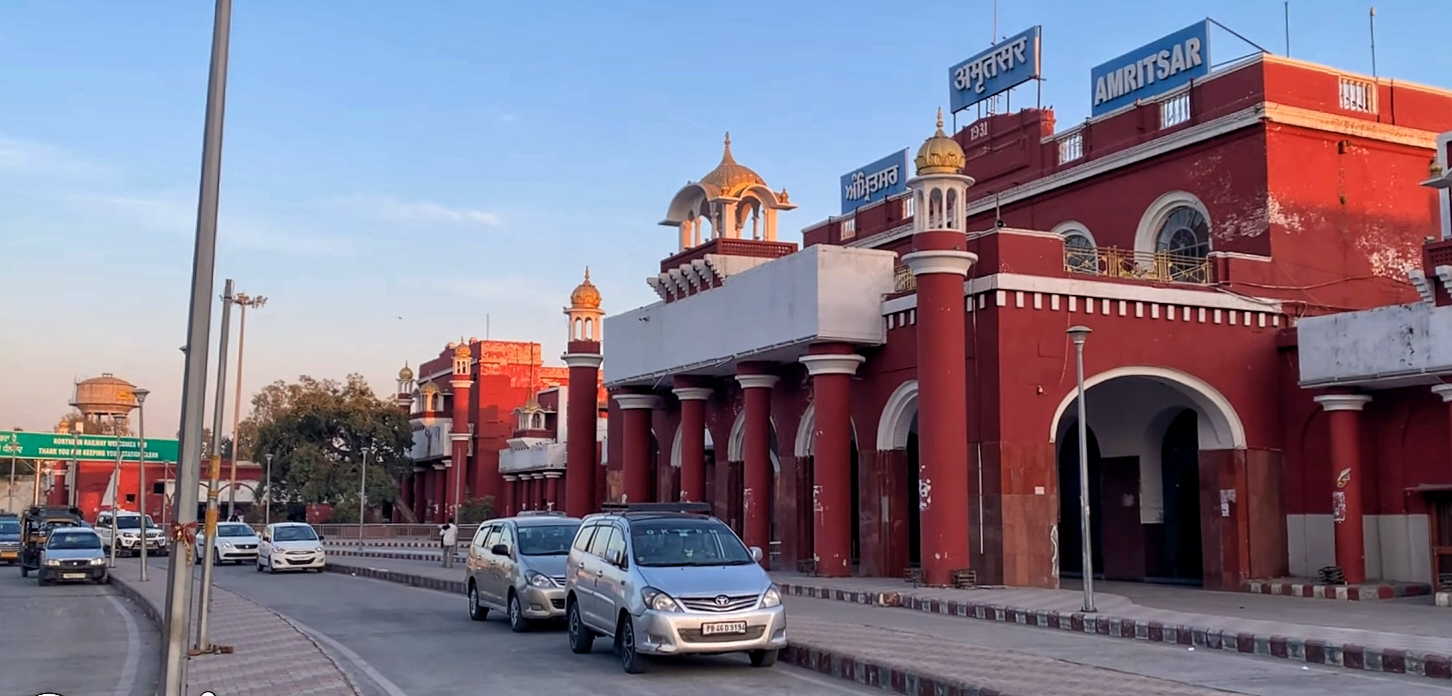
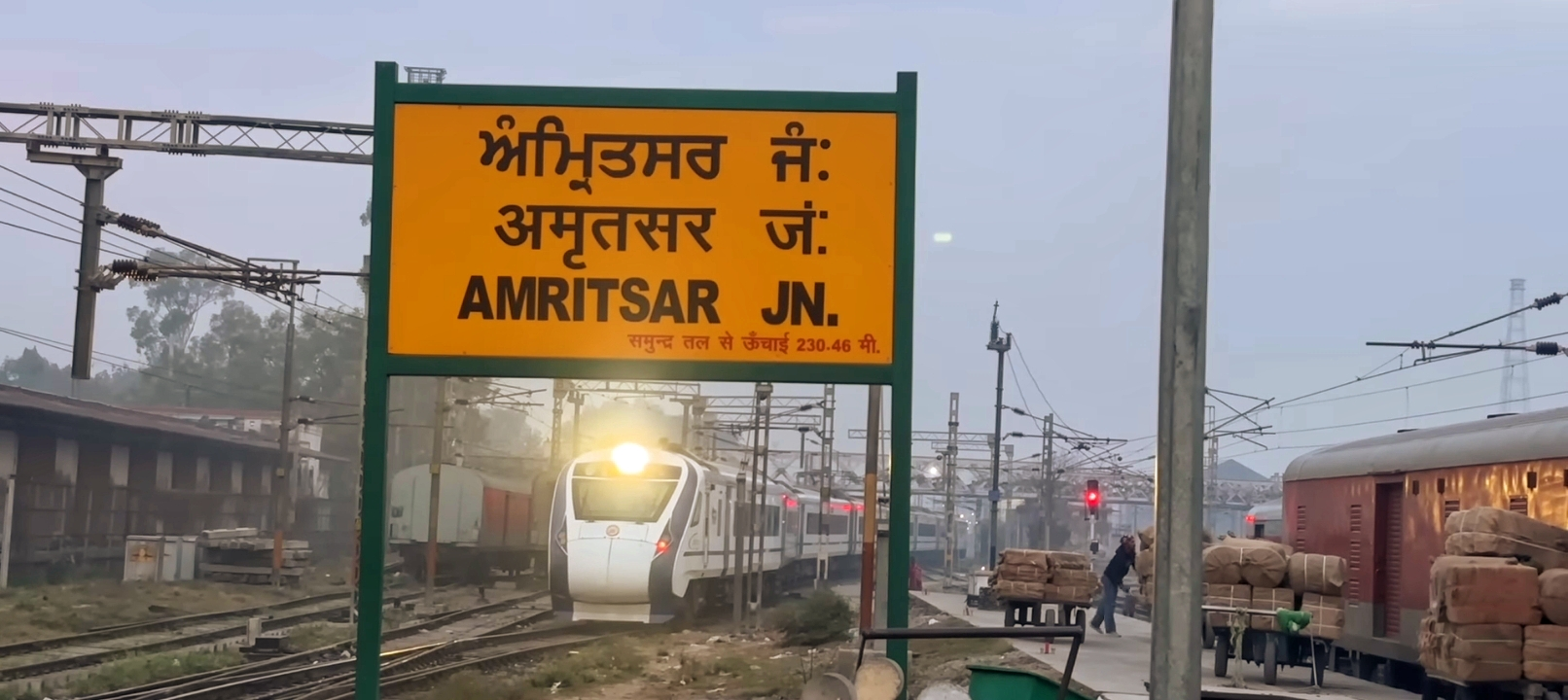
- Amritsar Junction Railway station

General information
- Location: GT Road, Putlighar Road, Amritsar, Punjab; India
- Coordinates: 31°37′58″N 74°52′02″E
- Elevation: 233 metres (764 ft)
- System: Junction station and Central station
- Owner: Indian Railways
- Operator: Northern Railways
- Lines: Amritsar–Jammu main line, Ambala–Attari line, Amritsar–Pathankot line, Amritsar–Dera Baba Nanak line, Amritsar–Khem Karan line
- Platforms: 10 (8 commercial + 1 freight + 1 Military Forces and Parcel)
- Tracks: 10 broad gauge

Construction
- Structure type: At grade
- Parking: Yes
- Cycle facilities: Yes
- Accessible: Available

Other information
- Status: Functioning
- Station code: ASR
- Zone(s): Northern Railway
- Division(s): Firozpur

History
- Opened: 1862; 164 years ago
- Electrified: 2003–04

Passengers
- 100000

Services
Preceding station	Indian Railways	Following station
Mananwala towards ?	Northern Railway zone Ambala–Attari line	Cheharta towards ?
Terminus	Northern Railway zone Amritsar–Khem Karan line	Bhagtanwala towards ?
Terminus	Northern Railway zone Amritsar–Pathankot line	Verka towards ?
Location
- Location within Punjab
- Interactive map

Amritsar Railway Station (station code: ASR) is a railway located in Amritsar district in the Indian state of Punjab and serves Amritsar. It is the largest and busiest railway station of Punjab.

== History ==
The Scinde, Punjab & Delhi Railway completed the Multan–Lahore–Amritsar line in 1865. The Amritsar–Attari section was completed on the route to Lahore in 1862.

The 78 km (48 mi)-long Amritsar–Khem Karan railway line runs through Tarn Taran and Patti.

A 54 km (34 mi)-long line links Amritsar to Dera Baba Nanak on the bank of the Ravi.

The 107 km (66 mi) Amritsar–Pathankot route runs through Batala and Gurdaspur. The 5 ft 6 in (1,676 mm) broad gauge Amritsar–Pathankot line was opened in 1884.

== Overview ==
The Amritsar railway station is located at an elevation of 233 metres (764 ft) and was assigned the code "ASR." With this, it has become the busiest railway station of the state in terms of passenger movement and train traffic. In the 2016 railway budget, the government has aimed to beautify the railway station as it is the main station of the holy city. The railway station is the first and only with WiFi in the division and CCTV has recently been enabled. In the recent railway budget, it has been mentioned that Amritsar Junction will be improved due to its importance in various fields. The Movement Control Office (MCO) for Armed Forces is also available at PF no 1.

There are ten platforms under use, 1(A), 1(B), 1, 2, 3, 4, 5, 6, 7 and 8. Platform no. 8 is used for freight trains. Platform no. 1(B) is reserved exclusively for freight and passenger trains of Indian Army.

== Electrification ==
The Phagwara–Jallandhar City–Amritsar sector was electrified in 2003–04.

== Development ==
Amritsar became the first railway station in the state to be WiFi-enabled. Following this announcement, concerns have been raised regarding the need to increase the station's capacity from the current 6 platforms to 8 platforms, aligning with International Airport standards. This is because it is the most important and busiest railway terminus of the state. Additionally, two more escalators would be installed in the station from Platform 5, as Platform 1 has already two. Platforms 6 and 7 were initiated in January 2018 in response to the substantial passenger movement within the city.

== Upcoming projects ==
The electrification work is under progress on the Amritsar–Khemkaran line. This is because, a new rail line has been passed by the railways from Patti, Punjab to Ferozpur which will reduce the distance of Amritsar from Ferozpur by 80 km. This will also reduces the distance and save the time to visit Rajasthan and Gujarat from Northern cities.

It has been planned to run Express trains on this route.

In December 2019, it has been announced that Bhagtanwala railway station and Chheharta railway station will be converted into satellite stations. Due to this the burden on Amritsar Junction railway station can be reduced.

== Railway workshop ==
Amritsar railway workshop carries out a periodic overhaul of WDS-4 locos and breakdown cranes and bogie manufacture.
