= Firozpur railway division =

Railway division of India

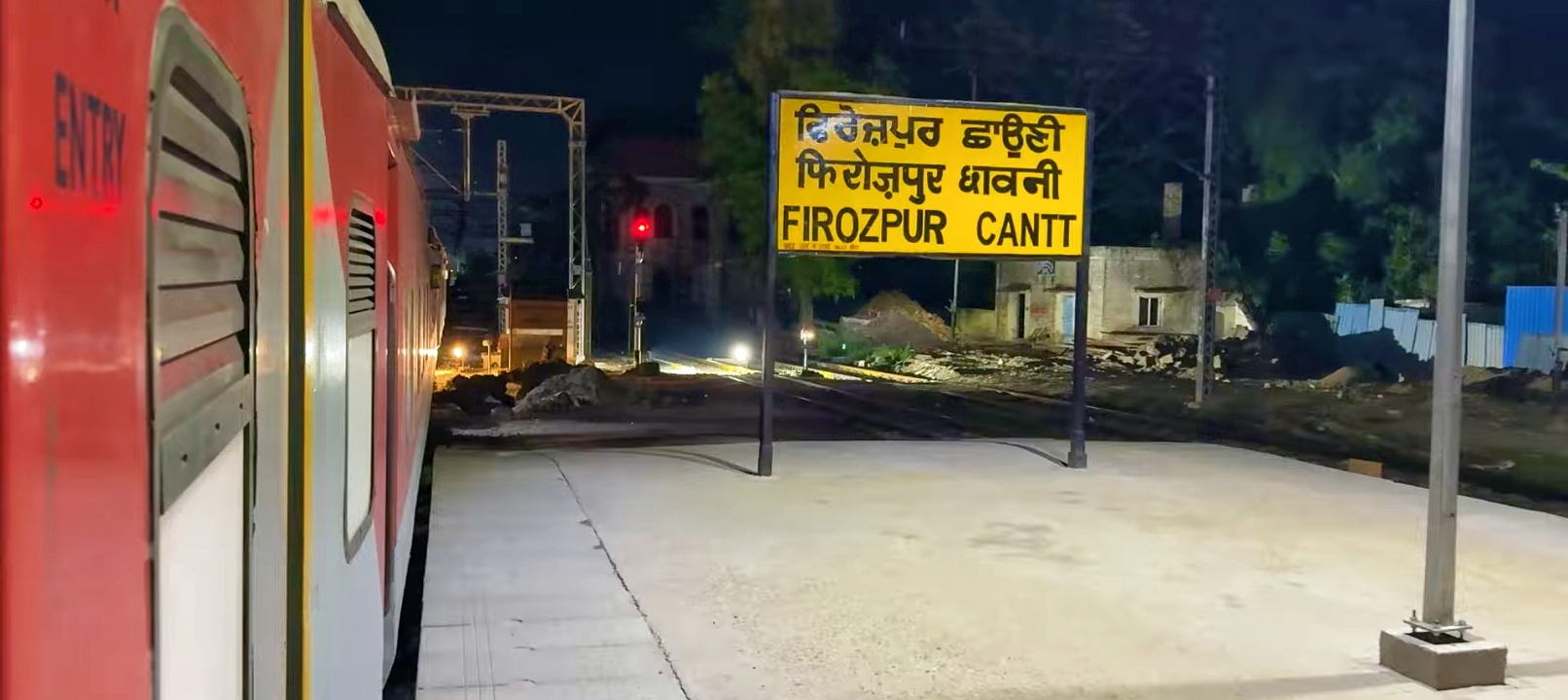
- Firozpur Cantonment

Overview
- Operator: Indian Railways
- Headquarters: Firozpur
- Locale: Punjab, India
- Dates of operation: 1852; 174 years ago–
- Predecessor: Northern Railway zone

Technical
- Length: 1,108 km (688 mi)

Other
- Website: nr.indianrailways.gov.in

Firozpur railway division is one of the six railway divisions under the jurisdiction of the Northern Railway zone of Indian Railways. Formed on 14 April 1852, its headquarters are located at Firozpur in Punjab, India.

Ambala railway division, Delhi railway division, Jammu railway division, Lucknow NR railway division, and Moradabad railway division are the other five railway divisions under the Northern Railway zone, which is headquartered at New Delhi.

Among all the divisions of Northern Railway zone, Firzopur railway division has some of the dirtiest and most ill maintained trains, and is also infamous for haphazard non-sequential coach compositions. This has been a cause of grave concern for many passengers.

== List of railway stations and towns ==
The following table lists the stations under the Firozpur railway division by category:

Category of station	No. of stations	Names of stations
A-1	3	Amritsar, Ludhiana
A	8	Beas Junction, Pathankot Cantonment, Firozpur Cantonment, Jalandhar City, Jalandhar Cantonment, Phagwara
B	—	—
C (Suburban station)	—	—
D	—	—
E	—	—
F (Halt station)	—	—
Total	—	—
