= Ambala railway division =

Railway division of India

Ambala Railway Division

Overview
- Owner: Northern Railway zone
- Locale: Ambala, Haryana, India

Service
- Type: Railway division
- System: Indian Railways

History
- Opened: 1 July 1987; 39 years ago

Ambala railway division is one of the five railway divisions under the jurisdiction of Northern Railway zone of the Indian Railways. It was formed on 1 July 1987 and its headquarters is located at Ambala in the Indian state of Haryana.

Delhi railway division, Firozpur railway division, Lucknow NR railway division and Moradabad railway division are the other railway divisions under NR Zone headquartered at New Delhi.

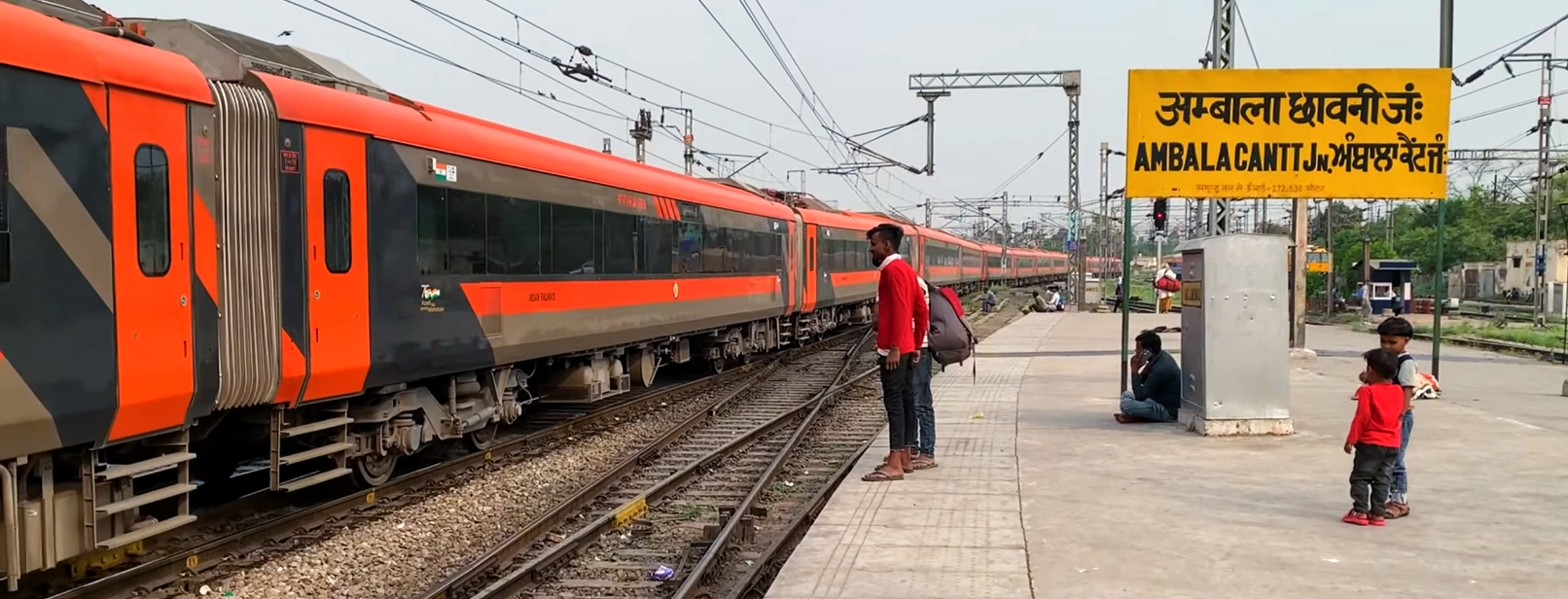
Ambala Cantonment Junction

== History ==
Ambala division came in to existence on 1 July 1987 when 639 km tracks from Delhi Division and 348 km from Firozpur Division were transferred under it and it became completely operational from 15 August 1988. 62% part of it lies in Punjab and the rest in Haryana (Ambala-Yamunanagar and Ambala-Kurukshetra line), Chandigarh and Himachal Pradesh (including UNESCO World Heritage Kalka Shimla Railway), Uttar Pradesh (Ambala-Yamunanagar section of Ambala-Yamunanagar-Saharanpur-Delhi line), and Rajasthan (Patiala-Abhoar-Ganganagar line). It has 141 stations.

== List of railway stations and towns ==
The list includes the stations under the Ambala railway division and their station category.

Category of station	No. of stations	Names of stations
A-1 Category	2	Ambala Cantonment Junction, Chandigarh
A Category	7	Bathinda Junction, Jagadhri, Kalka, Patiala, Rajpura Junction, Saharanpur Junction, Sirhind, Jakhal Junction
B Category	-	-
C Category (Suburban station)	-	-
D Category	-	-
E Category	-	-
F Category; Halt Station	-	-
Total	-	-

Stations closed for Passengers -
