= Ramidi Halt railway station =

Railway station in Punjab, India

Ramidi Halt

General information
- Location: Jalandhar-Amritsar Road, Subhanpur, Ramidi, Kapurthala district, Punjab; India
- Coordinates: 31°27′57″N 75°24′28″E
- Elevation: 220 metres (720 ft)
- System: Indian Railways
- Owner: Indian Railways
- Operator: Northern Railway
- Line: Ambala–Attari line
- Platforms: 1
- Tracks: 5 ft 6 in (1,676 mm) broad gauge

Construction
- Structure type: Standard on ground

Other information
- Status: Functioning
- Station code: RYM
- Division(s): Firozpur

History
- Opened: 1862

Services
Preceding station	Indian Railways	Following station
Dhilwan towards ?	Northern Railway zone Ambala–Attari line	Hamira towards ?
Location
- Location within Punjab Location within India

Ramidi Halt Railway Station a halt railway station on Ambala–Attari line under Firozpur railway division of Northern Railway zone. This is situated beside Jalandhar-Amritsar Road at Subhanpur, Ramidi in Kapurthala district in the Indian state of Punjab.

== History ==
Amritsar–Attari line was completed in 1862. the electrification of the line was completed in different period. Shahbad Markanda-Mandi Gobindgarh sector was electrified in 1995–96, the Mandi Gobindgarh–Ludhiana sector in 1996–97, the Phillaur–Phagwara sector in 2002–03, and the Phagwara–Jallandhar City–Amritsar in 2003–04.
