= Doraha railway station =

Railway station in Punjab, India

Doraha

General information
- Location: Main Bazaar Road, SBS Nagar, Doraha, Ludhiana district, Punjab; India
- Coordinates: 30°48′15″N 76°02′36″E
- Elevation: 261 metres (856 ft)
- System: Indian Railways
- Owner: Indian Railways
- Operator: Northern Railway
- Line: Ambala–Attari line
- Platforms: 2
- Tracks: 5 ft 6 in (1,676 mm) broad gauge

Construction
- Structure type: Standard on ground

Other information
- Status: Functioning
- Station code: DOA
- Division(s): Ambala

History
- Opened: 1870

Services
Preceding station	Indian Railways	Following station
Sahnewal towards ?	Northern Railway zone Ambala–Attari line	Chawapall towards ?
Location
- Location within Punjab Location within India

Doraha railway station a railway station on Ambala–Attari line under Ambala railway division of Northern Railway zone. This is situated beside Main Bazaar Road, SBS Nagar at Doraha in Ludhiana district in the Indian state of Punjab.

== History ==
Amritsar–Attari line was completed in 1862. the electrification of the line was completed in different period. Shahbad Markanda-Mandi Gobindgarh sector was electrified in 1995–96, the Mandi Gobindgarh–Ludhiana sector in 1996–97, the Phillaur–Phagwara sector in 2002–03, and the Phagwara–Jallandhar City–Amritsar in 2003–04.
