= Tangra railway station =

Railway station in Punjab, India

Tangra

General information
- Location: National Highway 1, Tangra, Amritsar district, Punjab; India
- Coordinates: 31°34′35″N 75°06′26″E
- Elevation: 235 metres (771 ft)
- System: Indian Railways
- Owner: Indian Railways
- Operator: Northern Railway
- Line: Ambala–Attari line
- Platforms: 2
- Tracks: 5 ft 6 in (1,676 mm) broad gauge

Construction
- Structure type: Standard on ground

Other information
- Status: Functioning
- Station code: TRA
- Division(s): Firozpur

History
- Opened: 1862

Services
| Preceding station | Indian Railways | Following station |
|---|---|---|
| Jandiala towards ? | Northern Railway zone Ambala–Attari line | Butari towards ? |
Location
- Location within Punjab Location within India

Tangra Railway Station a railway station on Ambala–Attari line under Firozpur railway division of Northern Railway zone. This is situated beside National Highway 1 at Tangra in Amritsar district in the Indian state of Punjab.

== History ==
Amritsar–Attari line was completed in 1862. the electrification of the line was completed in different period. Shahbad Markanda-Mandi Gobindgarh sector was electrified in 1995–96, the Mandi Gobindgarh–Ludhiana sector in 1996–97, the Phillaur–Phagwara sector in 2002–03, and the Phagwara–Jallandhar City–Amritsar in 2003–04.
