= Mananwala railway station =

Railway station in Punjab, India

Mananwala

General information
- Location: Rakh Manawala, Amritsar district, Punjab; India
- Coordinates: 31°36′46″N 74°58′00″E
- Elevation: 233 metres (764 ft)
- System: Indian Railways
- Owner: Indian Railways
- Operator: Northern Railway
- Line: Ambala–Attari line
- Platforms: 2
- Tracks: 5 ft 6 in (1,676 mm) broad gauge

Construction
- Structure type: Standard on ground

Other information
- Status: Functioning
- Station code: MOW
- Division(s): Firozpur

History
- Opened: 1862

Services
Preceding station	Indian Railways	Following station
Amritsar Junction towards ?	Northern Railway zone Ambala–Attari line	Jandiala towards ?
Location
- Location within Punjab Location within India

Mananwala Railway Station a railway station on Ambala–Attari line under Firozpur railway division of Northern Railway zone. This is situated at Rakh Manawala in Amritsar district in the Indian state of Punjab.

== History ==
Amritsar–Attari line was completed in 1862. the electrification of the line was completed in different period. Shahbad Markanda-Mandi Gobindgarh sector was electrified in 1995–96, the Mandi Gobindgarh–Ludhiana sector in 1996–97, the Phillaur–Phagwara sector in 2002–03, and the Phagwara–Jallandhar City–Amritsar in 2003–04.
