= Baba Sodhal Nagar railway station =

Railway station in Punjab, India

Baba Sodhal Nagar

General information
- Location: Nivia Park Road, Industrial Area, Jalandhar, Jalandhar district, Punjab; India
- Coordinates: 31°21′11″N 75°33′54″E
- Elevation: 239 metres (784 ft)
- System: Indian Railways
- Owner: Indian Railways
- Operator: Northern Railway
- Line: Ambala–Attari line
- Platforms: 1
- Tracks: 5 ft 6 in (1,676 mm) broad gauge

Construction
- Structure type: Standard on ground

Other information
- Status: Functioning
- Station code: BBSL
- Division(s): Firozpur

History
- Opened: 1862

Services
Preceding station	Indian Railways	Following station
Sura Nussi towards ?	Northern Railway zone Ambala–Attari line	Jalandhar City towards ?
Location
- Location within Punjab Location within India

Baba Sodhal Nagar Railway Station a halt railway station on Ambala–Attari line under Firozpur railway division of Northern Railway zone. This is situated beside Nivia Park Road at Industrial Area, Jalandhar in Jalandhar district in the Indian state of Punjab.

== History ==
Amritsar–Attari line was completed in 1862. the electrification of the line was completed in different period. Shahbad Markanda-Mandi Gobindgarh sector was electrified in 1995–96, the Mandi Gobindgarh–Ludhiana sector in 1996–97, the Phillaur–Phagwara sector in 2002–03, and the Phagwara–Jallandhar City–Amritsar in 2003–04.
