= Chiheru railway station =

Railway station in Punjab, India

Chiheru

General information
- Location: National Highway 44, Chiheru, Tehsil Phagwara, Kapurthala district, Punjab; India
- Coordinates: 31°15′46″N 75°42′24″E
- Elevation: 238 metres (781 ft)
- System: Indian Railways
- Owner: Indian Railways
- Operator: Northern Railway
- Line: Ambala–Attari line
- Platforms: 2
- Tracks: 5 ft 6 in (1,676 mm) broad gauge

Construction
- Structure type: Standard on ground

Other information
- Status: Functioning
- Station code: CEU
- Division(s): Firozpur

History
- Opened: 1862

Services
| Preceding station | Indian Railways | Following station |
|---|---|---|
| Jalandhar Cantonment towards ? | Northern Railway zone Ambala–Attari line | Phagwara towards ? |
Location
- Location within Punjab Location within India

Chiheru railway station a railway station on Ambala–Attari line under Firozpur railway division of Northern Railway zone. This is situated beside National Highway 44 at Chiheru, Tehsil Phagwara in Kapurthala district in the Indian state of Punjab.

== History ==
Amritsar–Attari line was completed in 1862. the electrification of the line was completed in different period. Shahbad Markanda-Mandi Gobindgarh sector was electrified in 1995–96, the Mandi Gobindgarh–Ludhiana sector in 1996–97, the Phillaur–Phagwara sector in 2002–03, and the Phagwara–Jallandhar City–Amritsar in 2003–04.
