= Khanna railway station =

Railway station in Punjab, India

Khanna Railway Station
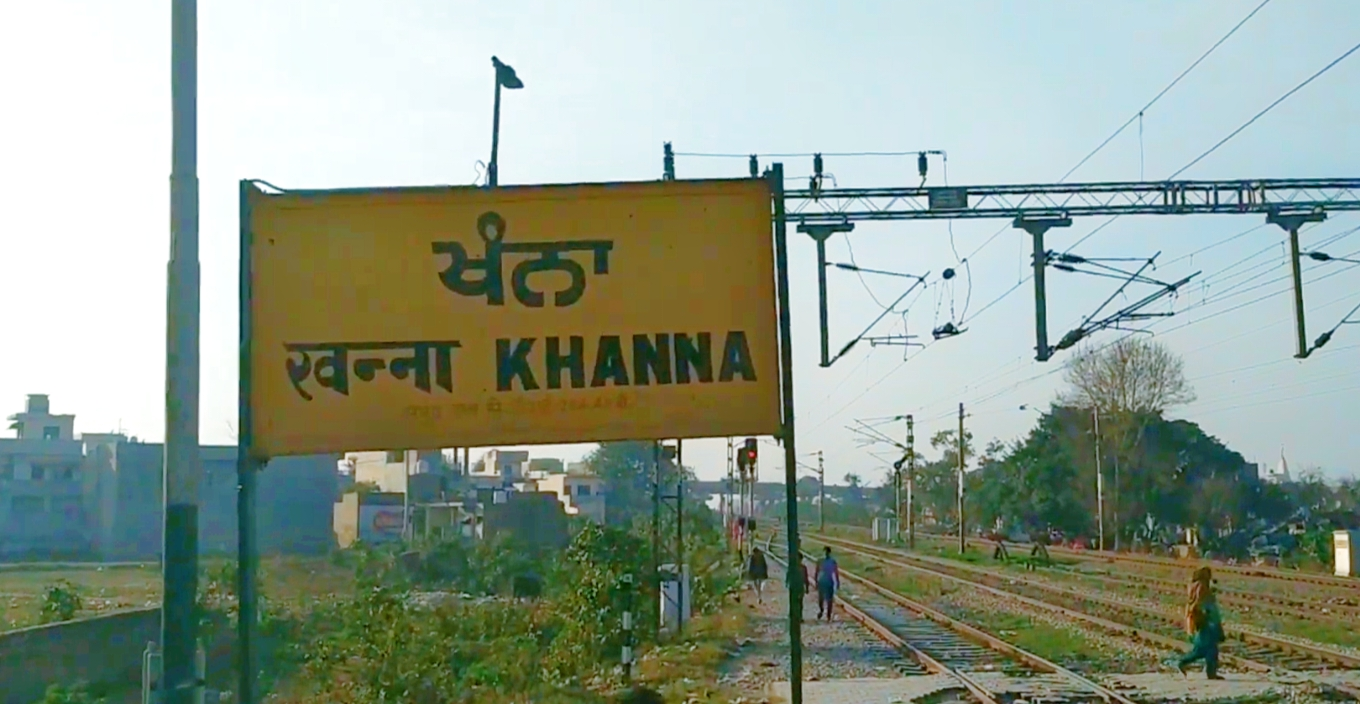
- Khanna Railway Station

General information
- Location: Shivpuri Mohalla, Khanna, Ludhiana district, Punjab; India
- Coordinates: 30°42′29″N 76°13′30″E
- Elevation: 269 metres (883 ft)
- System: Indian Railways
- Owner: Indian Railways
- Operator: Northern Railway
- Line: Ambala–Attari line
- Platforms: 3
- Tracks: 5 ft 6 in (1,676 mm) broad gauge

Construction
- Structure type: Standard on ground

Other information
- Status: Functioning
- Station code: KNN
- Division(s): Ambala

History
- Opened: 1870

Services
| Preceding station | Indian Railways | Following station |
|---|---|---|
| Chawapall towards ? | Northern Railway zone Ambala–Attari line | Mandi Gobindgarh towards ? |
Location
- Location within Punjab Location within India

Khanna railway station a railway station on Ambala–Attari line under Ambala railway division of Northern Railway zone. This is situated at Shivpuri Mohalla, Khanna in Ludhiana district in the Indian state of Punjab.

== History ==
Amritsar–Attari line was completed in 1862. the electrification of the line was completed in different period. Shahbad Markanda-Mandi Gobindgarh sector was electrified in 1995–96, the Mandi Gobindgarh–Ludhiana sector in 1996–97, the Phillaur–Phagwara sector in 2002–03 and the Phagwara–Jallandhar City–Amritsar in 2003–04.
