= Sarai Banjara railway station =

Railway station in Punjab, India

Sarai Banjara
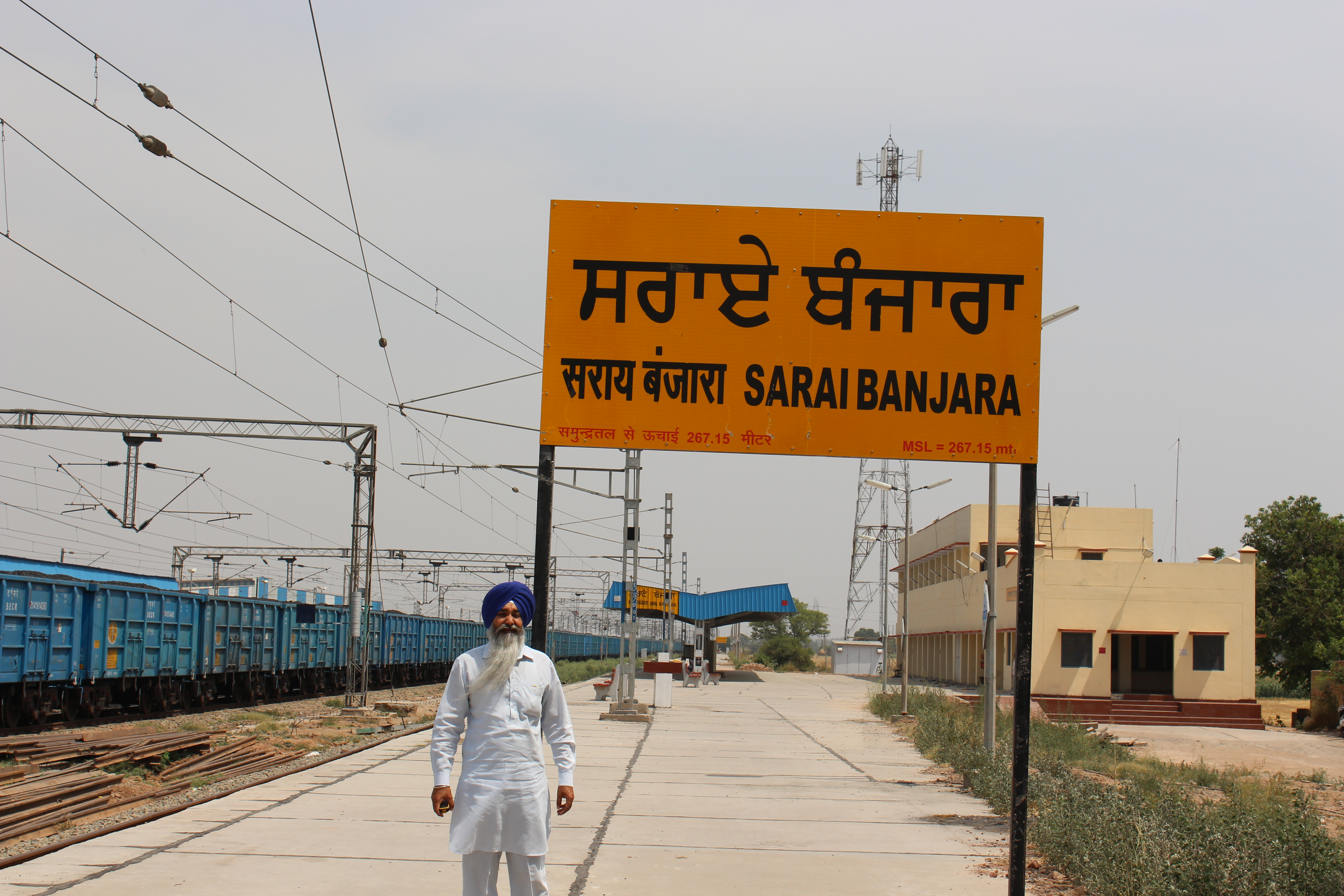
- Sarai Banjara railway station

General information
- Location: Basantpura, Sarai Banjara, Patiala district, Punjab; India
- Coordinates: 30°32′18″N 76°30′56″E
- Elevation: 271 metres (889 ft)
- System: Indian Railways
- Owner: Indian Railways
- Operator: Northern Railway
- Line: Ambala–Attari line
- Platforms: 3
- Tracks: 5 ft 6 in (1,676 mm) broad gauge

Construction
- Structure type: Standard on ground

Other information
- Status: Functioning
- Station code: SBJ
- Division(s): Ambala

History
- Opened: 1870

Services
Preceding station	Indian Railways	Following station
Sadhoo Garh towards ?	Northern Railway zone Ambala–Attari line	Rajpura Junction towards ?
Location
- Location within Punjab Location within India

Sarai Banjara is a railway station on the Ambala–Attari line, under the Ambala railway division of the Northern Railway zone, situated at Basantpura, Sarai Banjara in Patiala district in the Indian state of Punjab.

== History ==
Amritsar–Attari line was completed in 1862. The electrification of the line was completed in a different period. the Shahbad Markanda-Mandi Gobindgarh sector was electrified in 1995–96, the Mandi Gobindgarh–Ludhiana sector in 1996–97, the Phillaur–Phagwara sector in 2002–03 and the Phagwara–Jallandhar City–Amritsar in 2003–04.

== See more ==
- Sarai Banjara train disaster
