= Sangrai =

- Village
- Location in Punjab, India Sangrai (India)
- Coordinates: 31.614864°N 75.123890°E
- Country: India
- State: Punjab
- District: Gurdaspur

Government
  - Type: Panchayati raj (India)
  - Body: Gram panchayat

Population (2011)
  - Total: 470
- Sex ratio 222/248♂/♀

Languages
  - Official: Punjabi
  - Other spoken: Hindi
- Time zone: UTC+5:30 (IST)
- PIN: 143116
- Telephone code: 01822
- ISO 3166 code: IN-PB
- Vehicle registration: PB-09
- Website: kapurthala.gov.in

Sangrai is a village in Amritsar District of Punjab State, India. It is located 33 kilometres (21 mi) from Amritsar, which is both the district and sub-district headquarters for Sangrai. The village is administrated by a Sarpanch who is an elected representative.

Dhilwan, Batala, Nadala, Rayya-6 and Kapurthala are nearest Taluks and Kapurthala, Kartarpur, Jalandhar, Qadian are the nearby cities to Sangrai. Kapurthala, Jalandhar, Tarn Taran and Amritsar are the nearby District Headquarters to the village.

== Transport ==
=== Train ===
Dhilwan, Beas Junction, Hamira, and Baba Bakalaraya are the nearest railway stations to Sangrai however, Jalandhar City major railway station is 34 km away from the village.

=== Air ===
Raja Sansi airport, Pathankot airport, Ludhiana airport and Gaggal airport nearest airports are available to Sangrai village.

== Air travel connectivity ==
The closest airport to the village is Sri Guru Ram Dass Jee International Airport.
