= Mauli (disambiguation) =

Mauli was a dynasty of kings that ruled the Bhumi Malayu or Dharmasraya kingdom.

Mauli may also refer to:

- Mauli (film), a 2018 Indian Marathi-language action drama film
- Mauli Dave, an Indian singer, actress, dancer, and television host
- Mauli Chandra Sharma (M. C. Sharma), a senior Indian politician
- Mauli, Phagwara, a village in Kapurthala district of Punjab, India
- Kautuka, a ritual protection thread found on the Indian subcontinent, sometimes called a mauli
