= Raj Loomba, Baron Loomba =

The Right Honourable The Lord Loomba CBE
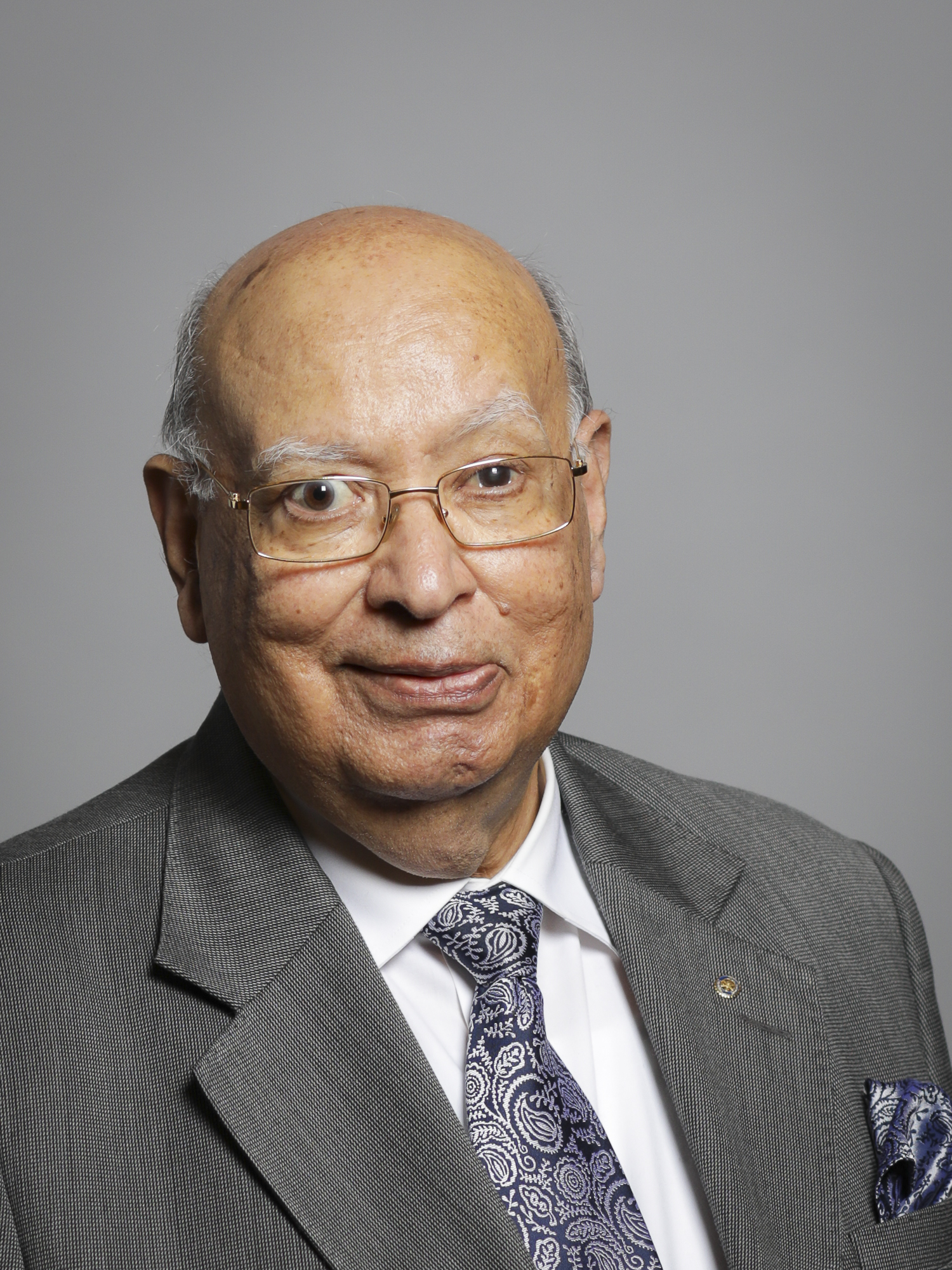

Member of the House of Lords
- Lord Temporal
- Life peerage 12 January 2011

Personal details
- Born: 13 November 1943 (age 82) Dhilwan, Punjab, British India
- Party: Non-affiliated
- Spouse: Veena Chaudhry
- Education: University of Iowa

Rajinder Paul Loomba, Baron Loomba, CBE (born 13 November 1943, Dhilwan, Punjab, India) is a philanthropist, founder and executive chairman of clothing company Loomba Group, and a member of the House of Lords.

== Life and career ==
Loomba was born as one of seven children in Dhilwan, in the state of Punjab, India. He was educated at D.A.V. College, Jallandhar and at the University of Iowa; his family moved to England in 1962. Loomba built up his fashion business from scratch, graduating from a stall at Widnes market to a shop, a wholesale business and then an import company, Rinku Group Ltd. The company has over 200 retail concession outlets in the UK, offices in London, Delhi and China, and supplies major retail groups.

Loomba is a member of the Rotary Club in London, the Institute of Directors and is a Freeman of the City of London. He is Chairman of the Friends of the Three Faiths Forum, is Patron of Children In Need India, and is the Founding Patron of the World Punjabi Organisation. He is Vice President of Barnardo’s and of the Safer London Foundation, a charity backed by the Metropolitan Police. In 1997 he was named Asian of the Year UK by Asian Who's Who International.

Loomba is married to Veena Chaudhry, with whom he has two daughters and one son.

== Charity work ==
Loomba has become well known for his fundraising and campaigning concerning the issue of widowhood in the developing world. His mother, Shrimati Pushpa Wati Loomba, was widowed at the age of 37 in India, and Loomba experienced first-hand the social and economic discrimination that widows in that country faced.

It was in his mother’s memory that Loomba set up his charity, The Loomba Foundation, which works to raise awareness of the issue of widowhood and which raises funds to educate the children of poor widows in India and empower widows in other developing countries in south Asia and across Africa. The flagship of the charity’s awareness campaign is International Widows Day, which takes place annually on 23 June, the anniversary of his mother’s widowhood. Following a sustained campaign, on 21 December 2010 the United Nations General Assembly formally recognised, by unanimous acclaim, 23 June as International Widows Day.

In recognition of his contribution to charity, in the 2008 Birthday Honours Loomba was appointed a Commander of the Order of the British Empire (CBE); he received his award from Prince Charles at a ceremony at Buckingham Palace.

== House of Lords ==
On 12 January 2011 Loomba was ennobled as a life peer with the name, style and title of Baron Loomba, of Moor Park in the county of Hertfordshire. He took up his seat in the House of Lords on 13 January 2011, representing the Liberal Democrats. He was introduced to the House on 17 January 2011, supported by the Lords McNally and Dholakia. On 21 January 2011 he gave his maiden speech in the House during a debate on the Rehabilitation of Offenders (Amendment) Bill.

In December 2016, Lord Loomba left the Liberal Democrats and now sits as a non-affiliated Peer. Explaining his decision he said: "I now wish to concentrate on issues such as human rights, gender equality, education and above all the United Nations’ 2030 Sustainable Development Goals".

== Arms ==
Coat of arms of Raj Loomba, Baron Loomba
Crest Seated on a lotus flower a representation of the four-armed goddess Saraswati vested crowned and garlanded the lower dexter hand and upper sinister hand playing a veena the upper dexter hand holding erect a garland of crystals and the lower sinister hand outstretched holding the book if Vedas all Proper. Escutcheon Azure two voided flaunches and on a roundel in chief Or a three-quarter length figure of a mother on the sinister vested and placing her dexter hand on the head of a child also three-quarter length with its arms outstretched to either side Azure in base a pierced roundel issuant and above it eight pierced roundels one two three and two Or. Supporters On either side a peacock Proper each supporting with the interior leg a veena palewiswe Proper. Motto Education And Experience

Orders of precedence in the United Kingdom
Preceded by The Lord Fellowes of West Stafford	Gentlemen; Baron Loomba	Followed by The Lord Ahmad of Wimbledon
