= JNL =

JNL may refer to:

== Places ==
- Jannali railway station (station code JNL), New South Wales, Australia
- Jandiala railway station (station code JNL), Punjab, India
- Junlian County (region code JNL), Yibin, Sichuan, China; see List of administrative divisions of Sichuan
- Jagat Narain Lal College, Khagaul, Bihar, India
- Jawaharlal Nehru Library, University of Mumbai, Mumbai, India

== Other uses ==
- Rawat language (ISO 639 language code jnl), a Tibeto-Burman language of India
- JetNetherlands (ICAO airline code JNL); see List of airline codes (J)
- JNL Inc. and JNL Fusion, companies founded by Jennifer Nicole Lee
- JNL, a jump instruction; see x86 instruction listings

== See also ==
- Journal (disambiguation) abbreviated jnl
- JNI (disambiguation)
- JN1 (disambiguation)
