= Gakhal pind =

Gakhal Gakhal Village
- Village
- Location in Punjab, India Gakhal (India)
- Coordinates: 31°18′30″N 75°30′46″E
- Country: India
- State: Punjab
- District: Jalandhar

Population (2011)
  - Total: 2,201

Languages
  - Official: Punjabi
- Time zone: UTC+5:30 (IST)
- Postal code: 144002
- Vehicle registration: PB- 08

Gakhal is a village in the Jalandhar West Block of Jalandhar district in Punjab, India. It is one among the 141 villages of Jalandhar West Block of Jalandhar district. The village is 3 kilometers away from Jalandhar-Kala Sanghia and is 6 kilometers away from the Jalandhar railway station. The most common surname of people in the village is Gakhal. As of 2004, Gakhal had a population of 2,201. Gakhal pind is also known as Gakhalan. Gakhals are part of the Jat clan. As per 2009 statistics, Gakhal village is also a gram panchayat.

The total area of village is 186 hectares. There are about 444 houses in the village. Jalandhar is nearest town to Gakhal.

== Demographics ==
Particulars	Total	Male	Female
Total No. of Houses	444	-	-
Population	2,201	1,133	1,068
Child (0-6)	164	90	74
Schedule Caste	296	152	144
Schedule Tribe	0	0	0
Literacy	83.26 %	88.97 %	77.26 %
Total Workers	685	641	44
Main Worker	664	0	0
Marginal Worker	21	19	2

Scheduled Caste constitutes 13.45% of total population in Gakhal village. Village Gakhal currently doesn't have any Scheduled Tribe (ST) population.

== Connectivity ==
- Public Bus Service - Available within 2–3 km distance
- Private Bus Service - Available within village
- Jalandhar Railway Station, Available within 5 – 6 km distance

== Education ==
- Govt. Sr. Sec. School, Gakhal-Dhaliwal
- St. Marry's Convent School, Gakhal

== Work profile ==
In Gakhal village out of total population, 685 were engaged in work activities. 96.93% of workers describe their work as Main Work (Employment or Earning more than 6 Months) while 3.07% were involved in marginal activity providing livelihood for less than 6 months. 685 workers engaged in Main Work, 251 were cultivators (owner or co-owner) while 5 were Agricultural labourer.
