= SBJ =

SBJ may refer to:

- Sarai Banjara railway station, Punjab, India (by Indian Railways station code)
- Statistics Bureau of Japan
- Stourbridge Junction railway station, West Midlands, England (by National Rail station code)
- Surbakhal language, Chad (by ISO 639-3 code)
