= Panjola =

Village in Punjab, India

- Village
- Location in Punjab, India Panjola (India)
- Coordinates: 30.512236°N 76.444330°E
- Country: India
- State: Punjab
- District: Fatehgarh Sahib
- Talukas: Sirhind

Area
  - Total: 2.59 km^{2} (1.00 sq mi)

Population (2011)
  - Total: 657
  - Density: 254/km^{2} (657/sq mi)

Languages
  - Official: Punjabi (Gurmukhi)
  - Regional: Punjabi
- Time zone: UTC+5:30 (IST)
- Vehicle registration: PB23
- Nearest city: Sirhind

Panjola is a village in the Sirhind Block of Fatehgarh Sahib district in Punjab, India.

== Geography ==
Panjola is located at 30.512236°N 76.444330°E in the Fatehgarh Sahib district of Indian Punjab. Sirhind Junction is the nearest railway station. The Village is located 18 kilometres south of District Headquarters Fatehgarh Sahib, seven kilometres from Sirhind and 46 kilometres from State capital Chandigarh.

== Demographics ==
As per the 2011 census, the village's total population was 657 with 123 households, of which 52.51% are males (345) and 47.49% are females (312), meaning the sex ratio in the village is skewed, with 847 females per 1000 males. Though residents have now started sending their daughters to schools, still only 63.46% of females are educated as compared to 72.75% of males. The overall literacy rate of the village is 68.34%. The Punjabi is the major language spoken by all in the village.

== Education ==
There is a Government Primary School in Panjola.
