= Jalandhar Cantonment railway station =

Rail station in Punjab, India

Jalandhar Cantonment Junction
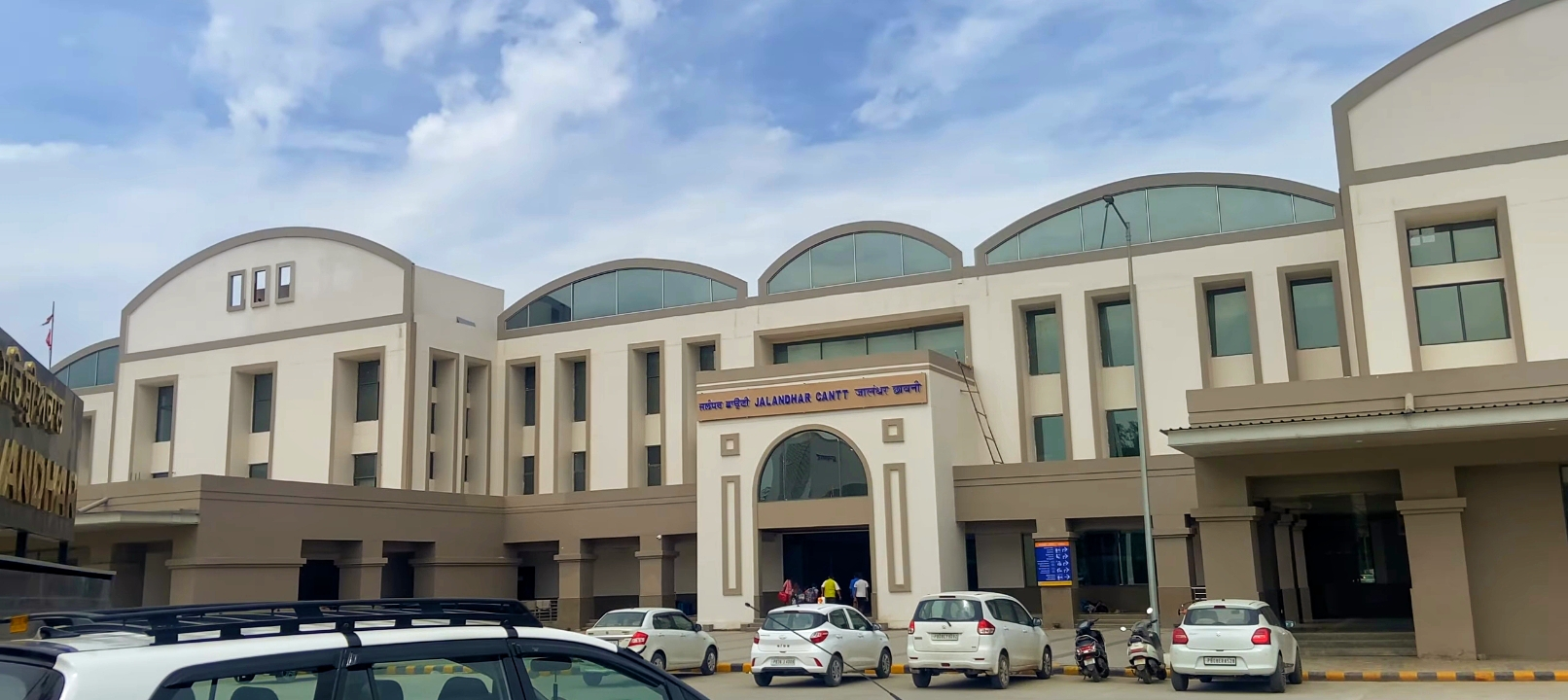
- Jalandhar Cantonment Junction Railway Station

General information
- Location: Opposite GT Road, near Rama Mandi, Jalandhar, Punjab; India
- Coordinates: 31°18′25″N 75°37′55″E
- Elevation: 239 metres (784 ft)
- System: Indian Railways junction station
- Owner: Indian Railways
- Operator: Northern Railway
- Lines: Ambala–Attari line, Jalandhar–Jammu line
- Platforms: 4
- Tracks: 5 ft 6 in (1,676 mm) broad gauge

Construction
- Structure type: At grade
- Parking: Yes
- Cycle facilities: No

Other information
- Status: Functioning
- Station code: JRC
- Zone(s): Northern Railway
- Division(s): Firozpur

History
- Opened: 1870
- Electrified: 2003–04

Services
Preceding station	Indian Railways	Following station
Chiheru towards ?	Northern Railway zone Ambala–Attari line	Jalandhar City towards ?
Terminus	Northern Railway zone Jalandhar–Nakoar line	Khalsa College (halt) towards ?
Terminus	Northern Railway zone Jalandhar–Jammu line	Suchipind towards ?
Terminus	Northern Railway zone Jalandhar–Hoshiarpur branch line	Bolinna Doaba towards ?
Location
- Location within Punjab Location within India

Jalandhar Cantonment Junction railway station (station code: JRC) is located in Jalandhar district in the Indian state of Punjab and serves Jalandhar.

== The railway station ==
Jalandhar Cantonment railway station is at an elevation of 239 metres (784 ft) and was assigned the code – JRC.

== History ==
The Scinde, Punjab & Delhi Railway completed the 483 km (300 mi) long Amritsar–Jalandhar–Ambala–Saharanpur–Ghaziabad line in 1870 connecting Multan (now in Pakistan) with Delhi.

The line from Jalandhar City to Mukerian was constructed in 1915. The Mukerian–Pathankot line was built in 1952. The construction of the Pathankot–Jammu Tawi line was initiated in 1965, after the Indo-Pakistani War of 1965, and opened in 1971.

Hoshiarpur was linked by rail with Jullundur Cantonment in 1913.

== Electrification ==
The Phagwara–Jalandhar City–Amritsar sector was electrified in 2003–04.

== DMU shed ==
India's first and largest DMU shed at Jalandhar holds 90 units placed in service in rural Punjab. It also houses two BEML-built rail buses which operate on the Beas–Goindwal Sahib line.
