= Shambhu, Punjab =

Shambhu
- Village
- Shambhoo
- Interactive map of Shambhu
- Location in Punjab, India Shambhu (India)
- Coordinates: 30°26′02″N 76°41′02″E
- Country: India
- State: Punjab
- District: Patiala district
- Tehsil: Rajpura

Population (2011)
  - Total: 1,245

Languages
  - Official: Punjabi, English
  - Spoken: Hindi
- Time zone: UTC+5:30 (IST)

Shambhu (Note: Alternative spellings: Shambhoo and Shambu.) is a village in the Patiala district, Punjab, India, near its border with Haryana. The village has a Khurd and Kalan (smaller and larger settlement) set-up. Shambhu Kalan is also the headquarters of an eponymous community development block with 83 villages.

== Geography ==
The Shambhu village and its associated hamlets are spread out on both sides of the Chandigarh–Delhi Highway (NH 44) near the Haryana border of Punjab. The Shambhu Khurd (smaller Shambhu) village is to the west of the highway near a railway station. The Shambhu Kalan (larger Shambhu) settlement is to the east of the highway at some distance.

A serai (rest area) was constructed on the side of the highway near Shambhu during the time of emperor Jahangir, which is now known as "Mughal Sarai". It is now a settlement and census village in its own right. Another settlement called Naushera ("new town") lies between Mughal Sarai and Shambhu Kalan. Further villages of Dahrian, Bapraur (Baprawar), Muhammadpur and Rajgarh lie along the highway towards Haryana.

The Ghaggar River flows to the southeast of the village area, forming the effective border with Haryana. On the Haryana side of the border is a highway toll plaza named "Shambhu toll plaza".

== Demographics ==
According to the 2011 census of India, Shambhoo Khurd has a population of 665 people, Shamboo Kalan 3589 people, Naushera 825 people and Mughal Sarai 475 people.

== See also ==
- Ambala

== Bibliography ==
- District Census Handbook: Patiala (PDF), Directorate of Census Operations, Punjab, 2011
