= Chak Daulatpur =

- Census town
- Location in Punjab, India Chak Daulatpur (India)
- Coordinates: 31.217558°N 75.6885601°E
- Country: India
- State: Punjab
- District: Jalandhar

Government
  - Type: Panchayat raj
  - Body: Gram panchayat
- Elevation: 240 m (790 ft)

Population (2011)
  - Total: 1
- Sex ratio 1/0 ♂/♀

Languages
  - Official: Punjabi
- Time zone: UTC+5:30 (IST)
- ISO 3166 code: IN-PB
- Website: jalandhar.nic.in

Chak Daulatpur is a village in Jalandhar district of Punjab State, India. It is located 21 kilometres (13 mi) from district headquarter Jalandhar, 11 kilometres (6.8 mi) from Phagwara, 44 kilometres (27 mi) from Hoshiarpur and 137 kilometres (85 mi) from state capital Chandigarh. The village is administrated by a sarpanch who is an elected representative of village as per Panchayati raj (India).

== Transport ==
Jalandhar city railway station is the nearest train station. The village is 61 kilometres (38 mi) away from a domestic airport in Ludhiana and the nearest international airport is located in Chandigarh. Sri Guru Ram Dass Jee International Airport is the second nearest airport which is 117 kilometres (73 mi) away in Amritsar.

== See also ==
- List of villages in India
