= Dhak Jagpalpur =

- Village
- Location in Punjab, India Dhak Jagpalpur (India)
- Coordinates: 31.311407°N 75.761859°E
- Country: India
- State: Punjab
- District: Kapurthala

Government
  - Type: Panchayati raj (India)
  - Body: Gram panchayat

Population (2011)
  - Total: 619
- Sex ratio 334/285♂/♀

Languages
  - Official: Punjabi
  - Other spoken: Hindi
- Time zone: UTC+5:30 (IST)
- PIN: 144401
- Telephone code: 01822
- ISO 3166 code: IN-PB
- Vehicle registration: PB-09
- Website: kapurthala.gov.in

Dhak Jagpalpur is a village in Tehsil Phagwara, Kapurthala district, in Punjab, India. It is located 10 kilometres (6.2 mi) from its sub-district headquarters at Phagwara, 50 km (31 mi) from the district headquarters at Kapurthala and 137 kilometres (85 mi) from the state capital at Chandigarh The village is administrated by a Sarpanch, who is an elected representative.

== Transport ==
Bolinna Junction and Chiheru are the closest railway stations to Dhak Jagpalpur; Jalandhar City railway station is 16 km (9.9 mi) distant. The village is 110 km away from Sri Guru Ram Dass Jee International Airport in Amritsar. Another nearby airport is Sahnewal Airport in Ludhiana which is 52 km (32 mi) from the village.
