= Pandrali =

Village in Punjab, India

Pandrali Pandraali
- Village
- Location in Punjab, India Pandrali (India)
- Coordinates: 30.541269°N 76.355672°E
- Country: India
- State: Punjab
- District: Fatehgarh Sahib
- Talukas: Fatehgarh Sahib

Area
  - Total: 3.37 km^{2} (1.30 sq mi)

Population (2011)
  - Total: 1,194
  - Density: 354/km^{2} (918/sq mi)

Languages
  - Official: Punjabi (Gurmukhi)
  - Regional: Punjabi
- Time zone: UTC+5:30 (IST)
- PIN: 147104
- Vehicle registration: PB23
- Nearest city: Sirhind

Pandrali, sometimes spelled as Pandraali is a village in the Sirhind Block of Fatehgarh Sahib district in Punjab, India.

== Geography ==
Pandrali is located at 30.541269°N 76.355672°E in the Fatehgarh Sahib district of Indian Punjab. Sirhind Junction is the nearest railway station.

== Demographics ==
As per the 2011 census, the village has total population of 1194 with 233 households, of which 53.5% are males (652) and 46.5% are females (542) means sex ratio in the village is skewed as with 831 females per 1000 males. Though residents have now started sending their daughters to schools, still only 43.2% of females are educated as compared to 56.8% of males. The overall literacy rate of the village is 63%. The Punjabi is the major language spoken by all in the village.

== Education ==
There is a Govt. Primary School and a Govt. Middle School in Pandrali.
