= Jakhwali =

Village in Punjab, India

Jakhwali Jakhwaali
- Village
- Location in Punjab, India Jakhwali (India)
- Coordinates: 30.489749°N 76.4102769°E
- Country: India
- State: Punjab
- District: Fatehgarh Sahib
- Talukas: Fatehgarh Sahib

Area
  - Total: 3.19 km^{2} (1.23 sq mi)

Population (2011)
  - Total: 1,361
  - Density: 427/km^{2} (1,110/sq mi)

Languages
  - Official: Punjabi (Gurmukhi)
  - Regional: Punjabi
- Time zone: UTC+5:30 (IST)
- Vehicle registration: PB23
- Nearest city: Sirhind

Jakhwali, sometimes spelled as Jakhwaali is a village in the Sirhind Block of Fatehgarh Sahib district in Punjab, India.

== Geography ==
Jakhwali is located at 30.489749°N 76.4102769°E in the Fatehgarh Sahib district of Indian Punjab. Sirhind Junction is the nearest railway station.

== Demographics ==
As per 2011 census, the village has total population of 1361 with 274 households, of which 53.5% are males (728) and 46.5% are females (633) means sex ratio in the village is skewed as with 777 females per 1000 males. Though residents have now started sending their daughters to schools, still only 44.4% of females are educated as compared to 55.6% of males. The overall literacy rate of the village is 64.5%. The Punjabi is the major language spoken by all in the village.

== Religion ==
Though the village has a strong secular culture, the majority of population follows Sikhism. Some population also follows Hinduism and Islam. Besides a common Gurudwara, there is a large number of religious places of various religions in the village and they are visited by all.

== Education ==
There is a Govt. Primary School and a Govt. Middle School in Jakhwali.

== Occupation ==
Residents of the village are mostly farmers with very few other jobs including government jobs. The main source of irrigation is groundwater through pumps, canal water and rainfall. With availability of machinery and knowledge, farmers normally stick to wheat and rice cultivation.
