= Sakar Khan =

Indian musician

- Born: 9 August 1938 (age 88); Hamira, Rajasthan, India
- Died: 10 August 2013; Hamira, Rajasthan, India
- Resting place: Hamira; 27°00′N 71°04′E
- Occupations: Folk, Classical musician
- Spouse: Bubba Devi
- Children: Ghewar Khan; Firoze Khan; Darra Khan, Satar khan
- Parent: Ustad Chuhad Khan
- Awards: Padma Shri; Tulsi Samman; Sangeet Natak Akademi Award

Sakar Khan (aka Sakar Khan Manganiar) (1938–2013) was an Indian musician, considered by many as the greatest exponent of the Kamayacha (or Kamaicha), a Rajasthani version of the Persian musical instrument of the same name, popular among the Manganiar community of the Indian desert state. The Government of India honoured Khan in 2012, with the fourth highest civilian award of Padma Shri.

== Biography ==
He was a folk artiste who reached world stage purely by way of his merit. He did not even know what publicity meant. But give him his kamyancha and the man was a rockstar, though an unknown one, says Pt. Vishwa Mohan Bhatt, Grammy award winner

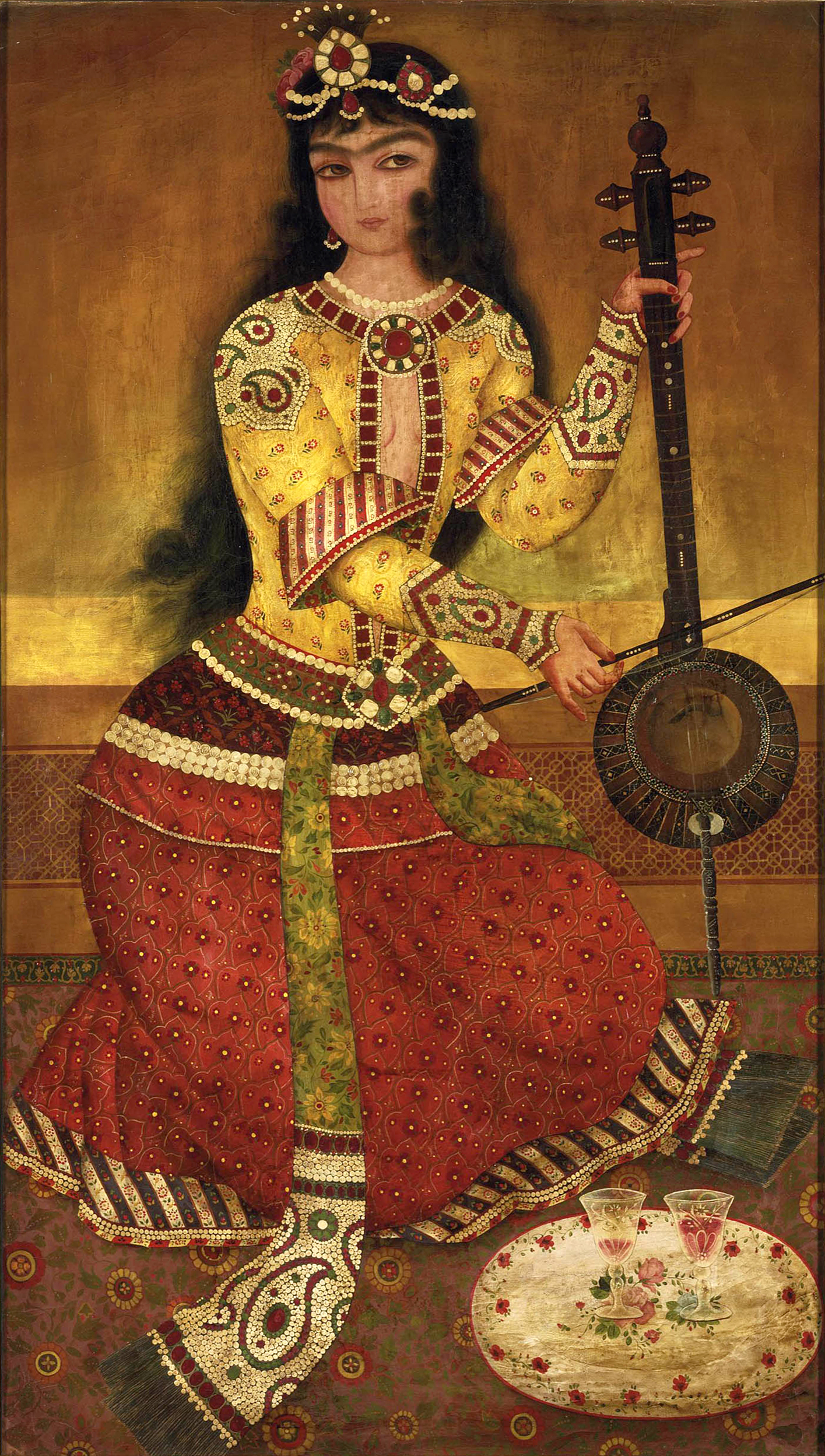
A woman playing kamancheh, Qazar Iran, 1800-1825.

Sakar Khan was born on 9 August 1938 at Hamira, a small village in the Jaisalmer district of the Indian state of Rajasthan, in the Manganiar community, known for their traditional music. His father, Ustad Chuhad Khan, was a renowned kamayacha (kamaicha) musician and the young Sakar started learning kamayacha (kamaicha) from an early age under the tutelage of his father to earn a name for himself later.

Khan has performed in many parts of the world, notably in Brussels, at a concert at the Cirque Royal Auditorium, organized by the International Yehudi Menuhin Foundation, titled, From the Sitar to the Guitar where he played alongside such musicians as Yehudi Menuhin and Pandit Ravi Shankar. His concerts have taken place in countries such as US, France, Japan and USSR and has performed with George Harrison, the Beatle, and Sultan Khan in London.

Sakar Khan, who is credited with getting the Rajasthani kamancha noticed at the world stage, is reported to have made innovations to the instrument, originally a rabab look alike stringed instrument composed of a goat skin covered body and three or four main and fourteen sympathetic strings by adding to the number of sympathetic strings to enhance the emotional appeal of the instrument. His renditions of Bhairavi raga and Kalyani raga have been stored in the ethnomusicology archives of Smithsonian Folkways, the record label of the Smithsonian Institution. His performance at The Manganiyar Seduction, was as a guest of honour at the Purana Qila in Delhi in November 2010, following which the organisers, Amarrass Records, made analogue field recordings of the maestro at his home in Hamira, Rajasthan, released as At Home: Sakar Khan (Amarrass Records) in September 2012. This remains the only album released by Sakar Khan. His last public performance was at the Amarrass Desert Music Festival 2012 in December in New Delhi, India.

Sakar Khan died on 10 August 2013 due to respiratory illnesses and is survived by his wife, Bubba Devi, their four sons and two daughters. Four of his sons, Ghewar Khan, Feroze Khan and Darra Khan, Satar are known kamayacha (kamaicha) musicians and accompany their father on concerts.

== Awards and recognitions ==
The Government of Madhya Pradesh awarded Sakar Khan the Tulsi Samman in 1990. The next year, in 1991, he received the Sangeet Natak Akademi Award from the Government of India which, twenty one years later, followed it up with the fourth highest civilian award of Padma Shri, in 2012.

== See also ==
- Kamancha
- Rajasthani music
- Manganiar
- Yehudi Menuhin
- Ravi Shankar
