= JN1 =

JN1 may refer to:

== Arts, entertainment, media, literature ==
- Jewish News One or JN1, a Jewish and Israeli current affairs news network
- Jodi No.1 (TV series), a TV reality dance show broadcast in India
- John 1, the first chapter of the Gospel of John in the New Testament of the Christian Bible

== Transportation and vehicular ==
=== Automotive ===
- Japanese Rally Championship JN1 competition class
- JN1 vehicle identification number prefix code for Nissan-Infiniti

=== Aviation ===
- Curtiss JN-1, an American biplane trainer aircraft
- Naleszkiewicz JN 1, a Polish experimental tailless sailplane
- Peris JN-1, an American homebuilt aircraft

== Times, dates, eras ==
- June 1, a day in the year
- JN I, a period in Single Grave culture

== Other uses ==
- JN.1, a subvariant of the SARS-CoV-2 virus which causes COVID-19

== See also ==
- JNL (disambiguation)
- JNI (disambiguation)
- JN (disambiguation)
