= Govind Ram Nirmalkar =

Indian actor (1935–2014)

- Born: 10 October 1935; Mohara, Rajnandgaon, Chhattisgarh, India
- Died: 27 July 2014 (aged 78); Raipur, Chhattisgarh, India
- Occupations: Actor; Folk theatre artist
- Known for: Nacha folk theatre
- Awards: Padma Shri; Sangeet Natak Akademi Award; Tulsi Samman; Dau Mandarji Samman

Govind Ram Nirmalkar (1935–2014) was an Indian actor and folk theatre artist, known for his contributions to the Nacha folk theatre of Chhattisgarh. His portrayal of the protagonist in Charan Das Chor, a play by Habib Tanveer, won him critical acclaim. The Government of India awarded him the fourth highest civilian honour of the Padma Shri, in 2009, for his contributions to Arts. He was also a recipient of the 2012 Sangeet Natak Akademi Award.

== Biography ==
Govind Ram Nirmalkar was born in Mohara, a small village in Rajnandgaon district of the Indian state of Chhattisgarh on 10 October 1935. His early training was under Madanlal Nishad, a noted artist of the Nacha Theatre, the traditional folk theatre of the state. He trained playing the traditional music instruments of Dholak and Manjira and started participating in Nacha shows as an accompanist. He joined Kheli Nacha Party, a known Nacha theatre troupe, in 1947 and stayed with them till 1970 and acted in many of their plays. In 1971, he moved to the Naya Theatre of Habib Tanvir where he stayed till his retirement in 2005. During the 35 years with the troupe, he acted in many plays staged by them, including the title role in Charandas Chor, considered by many as the masterpiece of Tanvir, which won the Fringe First award at the Edinburgh Festival Fringe in 1982. Lala Shoharat Rai, Mitti ki Gaadi, Bahadur Kalarin, Jis Lahore Nai Dekhya, Hirma ki Amar Kahani, Ponga Pundit and Agra Bazar are some of the other notable Naya Theatre productions he performed in.

The Government of Madhya Pradesh awarded Tulsi Samman jointly to Nirmalkar, Madanlal Nishad, his mentor, and Nacha Theatre, his old troupe, in 1988. He received the Dau Mandarji Samman of the Government of Chhattisgarh in 2006. Three years later, the Government of India included him in the 2009 Republic Day honours list for the civilian honour of the Padma Shri and the Indira Kala Sangeet University (IKSU), Khairagarh honoured him with the degree of DLitt (honoris causa) in 2013.

Nirmalkar died on 27 July 2014 at B. R. Ambedkar Memorial Hospital, Raipur in Chhattisgarh, succumbing to brain hemorrhage that followed a prolonged period of illnesses. It is reported that he was in debts and died in poverty. Padmashri Govind Ram Nirmalkar Auditorium, an auditorium at Rajnandgaon is named after him.

== See also ==
- Habib Tanvir
