= Manganiar =

Manghanhar
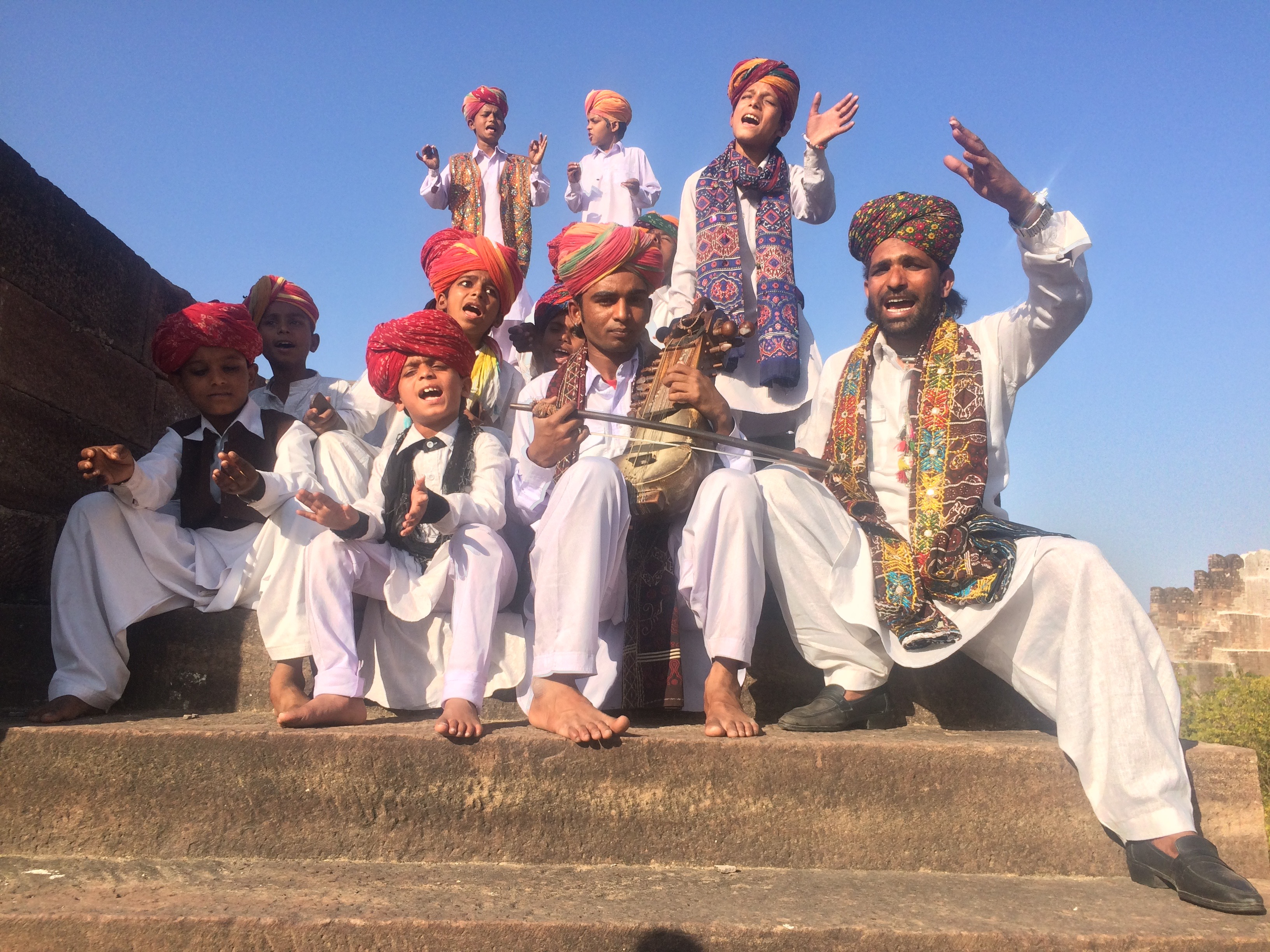
- Manganiar children performing with their guru at Mehrangarh Fort, Jodhpur at World Sufi Spirit Festival in 2016.

Total population
- Unknown

Regions with significant populations
- Rajasthan, India

Languages
- Marwari · Sindhi · Dhatki

Religion
- Islam

Related ethnic groups
- Langha (tribe)

The Manganiar are a Muslim community found in the Thar Desert region of Rajasthan, India; mostly in the districts of Barmer and Jaisalmer, and in the districts of Tharparkar and Sanghar in the bordering province of Sindh in Pakistan. They are known for various compositions describing stories focused on humans, nature, and salvation. They, along with the Langha community, are known for their folk music. They are groups of hereditary professional musicians whose music has been supported by wealthy landlords and aristocrats, especially their traditional Jajman (patrons) from the locally dominant Hindu Rajput and Charan communities for generations. Some of their ragas have originated in the Thar and are not found in the north Indian classical tradition.

== Etymology ==
Manganhar originated from the words mangan, which means "to beg", and hār which means "a garland of flowers.".

A legend is also among the people :-

In the prophet's house, Bibi Fatema offered a necklace (haar) to a Mirasi named Mangan. From this time onwards they were called the 'Manganhar' and the community is now known as Manganiyar.

== History ==
The Manganhars are renowned as folk musicians of the Thar Desert. Their songs are passed on from generation to generation as a form of oral history of the desert. The traditional Jajman (patrons) of the Manganhar are the locally dominant Rajput and Charan communities.

== Instruments ==
Kamaicha
The 17-string khamaycha is a bowed instrument. Made of mango wood, its rounded resonator is covered with goat skin. Three of its strings are goat intestine while the other 14 resonating strings are steel. The instrument is related to the Sarangi and persian Kamancheh.

Kartaal
The kartaal is a kind of castanet made of teak. Its name is derived from "Kar", meaning hand, and "Taal", meaning rhythm.

Dholak
The dholak is a hand drum similar in timbre to a bongo. A dholak may have traditional lacing or turnbuckle tuning. The dholak has a simple membrane and a handle on the right hand side. The left hand membrane has a special coating on the inner surface. This coating is a mixture of tar, clay and sand (dholak masala) which lowers the pitch.

== Notable people ==
- KANCHRA Khan, a singer
- Lakha Khan, folk musician, sarangi player and vocalist
- Mai Bhagi, Sindhi folk singer
- Mai Dhai, Pakistani MANGANIYARR folk singer
- Mame Khan, a folk singer
- Sakar Khan, Kamaicha player, PADMASRI award winner
- Swaroop Khan, playback singer
