= Hamira =

Coordinates: 27°00′N 71°04′E

Hamira is a small town in Kapurthala district, in the Indian state of Punjab, situated on National Highway No. 1. It is generally known for its alcohol factory, Jagatjit Industries.

== Transport ==
Hamira railway station is situated on Ambala–Attari line under Firozpur railway division of Northern Railway zone.
