= Sarai Banjara train disaster =

2000 railway incident in Punjab, India

Details
- Date: 2 December 2000
- Location: Punjab
- Coordinates: 30.5613°N 76.4802°E
- Country: India
- Line: Eastern Railway
- Operator: Indian Railways
- Incident type: Derailment and collision
- Cause: Broken rail

Statistics
- Trains: 2
- Deaths: 46
- Injured: 150

The Sarai Banjara rail disaster occurred on 2 December 2000, when a derailed freight train crossed onto the opposite track early in the morning in Punjab, India. A Howrah–Amritsar Express a passenger train coming from other direction hit the freight train head-on at speed, killing 46 people and injuring at least 150.

The accident started when a cracked rail on the line between Mandi Gobindgarh and Rajpura in Punjab derailed a large freight train at 5.40 am without causing any injuries. The derailed train was covering both sides of the track, and so the driver dismounted to give a warning. As he was walking to the train office in Sarai Banjara railway station, the Howrah Mail train traveling between Calcutta and Amritsar crashed into the derailed freight train head-on at high speed.

Although the wreckage did not catch fire, the devastation was serious, with jack-knifed carriages, twisted metal, and the sheer number of injured people hampering the immediate rescue efforts. Ambulances arrived to take the injured to hospital, whilst local people, working alongside railway officials and emergency services tried to free the survivors trapped in the wreckage.

The final death toll was given as 46 killed and over 150 injured in the crash, although there have been some claims that over 50 people were killed. As is the custom in India, the rail authorities promised by way of compensation: 15,000 rupees to the families of the dead, 5,000 rupees to those seriously injured, and 500 to those with minor injuries.

Some politicians involved in the investigation initially believed that sabotage may have caused the goods train to derail, but a subsequent investigation concluded that the accident was entirely the result of poor track maintenance, combined with an inefficient warning system in case of emergency. The sabotage claim has been suggested by some as a ruse to disguise the dilapidated state of India's rail network.

Following the crash, the Hindustan Times ran an editorial, which commented:

"Indian Railways possibly runs the most unsafe service in the world. If the trains aren't killing people in collisions, then they are running over people at staffed and unstaffed crossings ... the body count is too high for anyone to feel safe in a train."

The site of the crash was not far from that of the Khanna rail disaster of 1998, in which 211 people were killed.
