= Jonnalagadda Gurappa Chetty =

Indian painter, craftsman and writer (1937–2021)

- Born: 1937; Srikalahasti, Chittoor district, Andhra Pradesh, India
- Died: 14 March 2021 (aged 86–87); Srikalahasti, India
- Occupations: Painter; Master craftsman Writer
- Known for: Kalamkari
- Children: Niranjan
- Parent: J. Lakshmaiah Chetty
- Awards: Padma Shri; Shilpaguru; Rasthriya Samman; Tulsi Samman

Jonnalagadda Gurappa Chetty (1937 – 14 March 2021) was an Indian painter, craftsman and writer, known for his contributions for the revival of the Indian textile art form of Kalamkari. He is a recipient of honours such as Shilpaguru, Rasthriya Samman, Tulsi Samman and Kamaladevi Vishwa Karigar Award. The Government of India awarded him the fourth highest civilian honour of the Padma Shri, in 2008, for his contributions to Kalamkari art.

== Education and career ==
Jonnalagadda was born to J. Lakshmaiah Chetty, in a family of Kalamkari artists at Srikalahasti, a temple town in the Chittoor district of Andhra Pradesh in 1937 and started learning the art from his father from an early age. His career started as a school teacher but he continued painting, focusing on Kalamkari art, which soon earned him appreciation. He is the author of three books in Telugu, Bharata Ratna Mala, Bhagavatha Mani Mala and Vraatha Pani (Kalamkari), besides contributing to an English publication by Parampaarik Kaarigaar.

Chetty died on 14 March 2021, at the age of 86–87.

== Awards ==
- 2008: Received Padma Shri award by the Government of India in 2008 for his contributions to Kalamkari art.

== See also ==
- Kalamkari
