= JN =

JN or Jn may refer to:

- Excel Airways (1994-2008, IATA airline designator)
- Livingston Compagnia Aerea (2012-2014, IATA airline designator), an Italian airline
- Jan Mayen (FIPS PUB 10-4 territory code), an island in the Arctic Ocean
- Gospel of John, in Christian scripture
- Johnson–Nyquist noise, electrical noise generated by random thermal motion in a conductor
- Jornal de Notícias, a Portuguese newspaper
- Jornal Nacional, a Brazilian flagship news program broadcast by TV Globo
- Jornal Nacional, former title of the Portuguese news program Jornal da 8 that is broadcast by TVI
- al-Nusra Front, a Syrian militant group in the Syrian Civil War
- , the official symbol for the Nambu Line in Japan
- Jitsugyo no Nihon Sha, a Japanese publishing company
