= International Widows Day =

United Nations ratified day of action

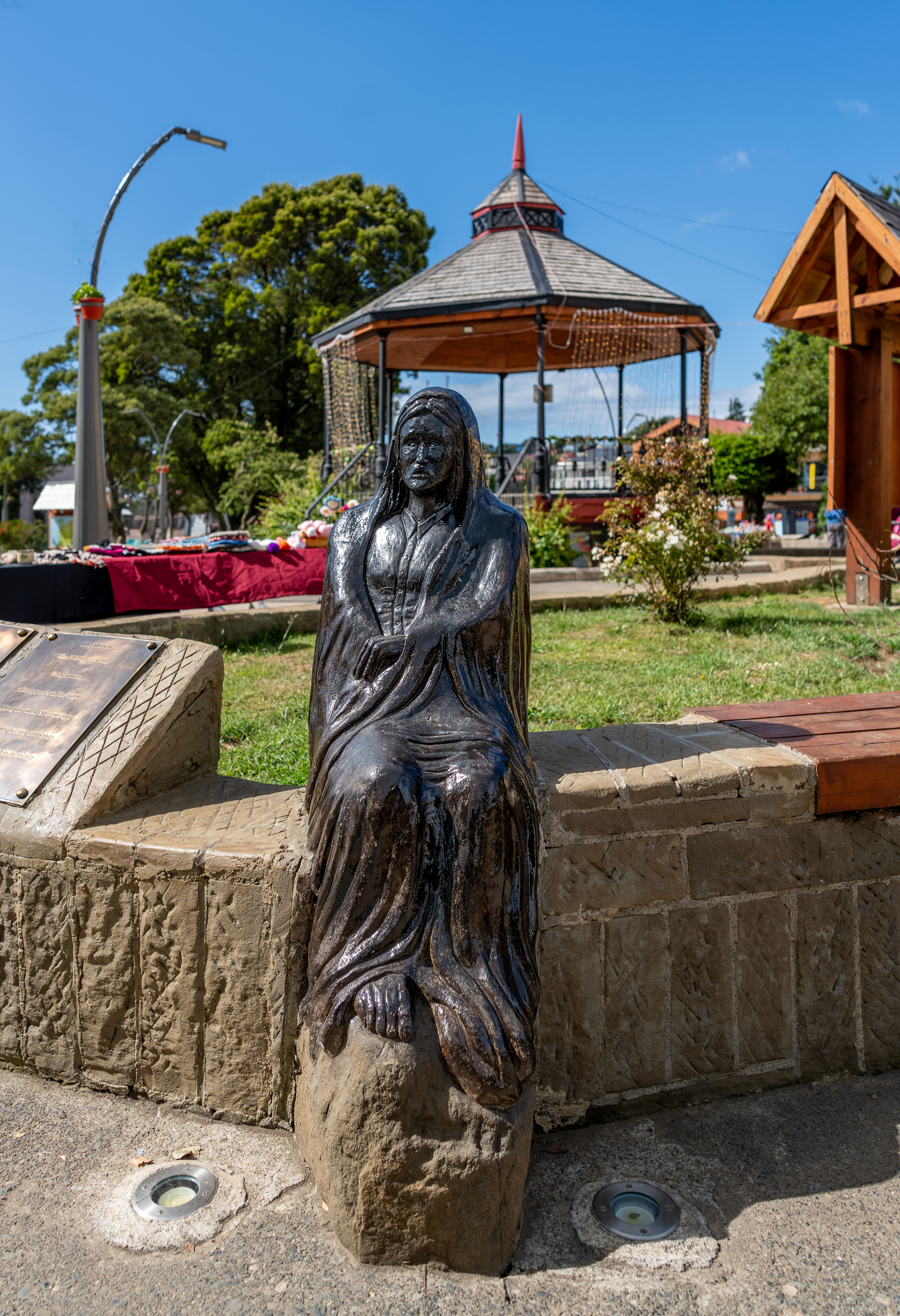
The Widow.

International Widows Day is a United Nations ratified day of action to address the "poverty and injustice faced by millions of widows and their dependents in many countries". The day takes place annually on 23 June.

International Widows Day was established by The Loomba Foundation to raise awareness of the issue of widowhood. The significance of 23 June is that it was on that day in 1954 that Shrimati Pushpa Wati Loomba, mother of the foundation's founder, Lord Loomba, became a widow. One of the foundation's goals is to highlight what it describes as an invisible calamity. A 2010 book, Invisible, Forgotten Sufferers: The Plight of Widows Around the World, estimates that there are 245 million widows worldwide, 115 million of whom live in poverty and suffer from social stigmatization and economic deprivation purely because they have lost their husbands. As part of the Loomba Foundation's awareness campaign, this study was presented to UN Secretary General Ban Ki-moon on 22 June 2010.

The first International Widows Day took place in 2005 and was launched by Lord Loomba and the foundation's president, Cherie Blair. By the sixth International Widows Day in 2010, events were held in Rwanda, Sri Lanka, the United States, the UK, Nepal, Syria, Kenya, India, Bangladesh and South Africa.

== United Nations recognition ==
On 21 December 2010, the United Nations General Assembly formally adopted 23 June as International Widows Day, endorsing by unanimous acclaim a proposal introduced by President Ali Bongo Ondimba of Gabon. As well as formally recognizing 23 June as a day of observance, the accompanying resolution called upon "Member States, the United Nations system and other international and regional organizations to give special attention to the situation of widows and their children."
