= Lakha Khan =

Indian Musical artist (born 1945)

PS Lakha Khan Mangniyar
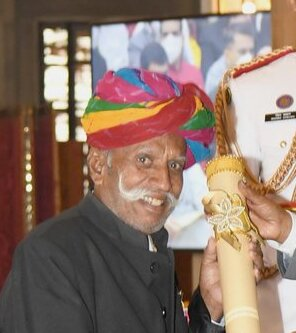
- Lakha Khan receiving Padma Shri

Background information
- Born: Lakha Khan; 1945 (age 80–81); Raneri, Jodhpur district, Rajasthan, India
- Genres: Rajasthani folk music, Sufi music
- Occupations: Musician, vocalist
- Instruments: Sindhi sarangi, vocals

Lakha Khan Mangniyar (born c. 1945) is an Indian folk musician, sarangi player, and vocalist, from Rajasthan. He is widely regarded as one of the last remaining masters of the Sindhi sarangi, an instrument relevant in the musical traditions of the Manganiyar community. Khan has played a significant role in preserving and promoting Rajasthani folk and Sufi music at both national and international levels.

== Early life and training ==
Lakha Khan was born in the village of Raneri in the Jodhpur district of Rajasthan, into a family of traditional Manganiyar musicians. He began learning music at a young age, initially studying vocal traditions before training in the Sindhi sarangi. By the age of 12, he had started performing publicly.

== Career ==
Khan’s early career was influenced by the ethnomusicologist Komal Kothari. He later toured internationally, introducing the Sindhi sarangi and Rajasthani folk repertoire to audiences abroad, including at WOMEX in Finland and the Roskilde Festival in Denmark.

Khan’s repertoire contains Rajasthani folk music, devotional bhajans, and Sufi music, often performed in multiple languages such as Marwari, Sindhi, Hindi, and Punjabi. He frequently collaborates with his son, Dane Khan, who accompanies him on the dholak.

== Awards ==
Lakha Khan has been honored with several national and state-level awards, including:

- Padma Shri (2021) in recognition of his lifelong dedication to the folk arts.
- Sangeet Natak Akademi Award (2008) for his excellence in folk traditions.
- Marudhara Foundation Award: for his work in preserving Rajasthani heritage.
