= JNI (disambiguation) =

JNI is the Java Native Interface, a Java programming framework.

JNI or jni may also refer to:

- Junín Airport (IATA airport code JNI), serving Junín, Buenos Aires, Argentina
- Janji language (ISO 639 language code jni), a Kainji language of Nigeria
- Jingning County (region code JNI), Pingliang, Gansu, China; see List of administrative divisions of Gansu
- Juanitaite (mineral symbol Jni); see List of mineral symbols
- Jama'atu Nasril Islam, an umbrella group for the Nigerian Muslims community
- Jansen Newman Institute, an Australian private college
- JN I, a period in Single Grave culture

== See also ==
- Jama'at Nasr al-Islam wal Muslimin (JNIM), a militant jihadist organisation in the Maghreb and West Africa
- JNL (disambiguation)
- JN1 (disambiguation)
