= Mauli, Phagwara =

Mauli
- Village
- Location in Punjab, India Mauli (India)
- Coordinates: 31.177200°N 75.758226°E
- Country: India
- State: Punjab
- District: Kapurthala

Government
  - Type: Panchayati raj (India)
  - Body: Gram panchayat

Population (2011)
  - Total: 3,285
- Sex ratio 1686/1599♂/♀

Languages
  - Official: Punjabi
  - Other spoken: Hindi
- Time zone: UTC+5:30 (IST)
- PIN: 144401
- Telephone code: 01822
- ISO 3166 code: IN-PB
- Vehicle registration: PB-09
- Website: kapurthala.gov.in

Mauli is a village in Phagwara tehsil in Kapurthala district of Punjab State, India. It is located 46 kilometres (29 mi) from Kapurthala, 6 kilometres (3.7 mi) from Phagwara. The village is administrated by a Sarpanch who is an elected representative of village.

== Transport ==
Phagwara and Mauli Halt railway station are the nearest railway stations to Mauli; Jalandhar City railway station is 26 km away. The village is 121 km away from Sri Guru Ram Dass Jee International Airport in Amritsar and Sahnewal Airport in Ludhiana is located 34 km away. Phagwara, Jandiala, Jalandhar, Phillaur are the nearby cities.
