= Dhilwan =

- Town
- Location in Punjab, India Dhilwan (India)
- Coordinates: 31.52°N 75.35°E
- Country: India
- State: Punjab
- District: Kapurthala

Government
  - Type: Municipal corporation

Population (2001)
  - Total: 7,980

Languages
  - Official: Punjabi
- Time zone: UTC+5:30 (IST)
- Vehicle registration: PB-09
- Website: dhilwan.org

Dhilwan is a town and a nagar panchayat in Kapurthala district in the state of Punjab, India.

== History ==
In 1983 Dhilwan Bus massacre 15 Hindu bus passengers going from Dhilwan to Jalandhar were killed by pro-Khalistan Sikh militants at Dhilwan.

== Geography ==
Dhilwan is located at 31.52°N 75.35°E in Punjab. It has an average elevation of 219 metres (718 feet).

== Dhilwan Kalan ==
Dhilwan and Dhilwan Kalan in Sikh History Books are two different places. Dhilwan Kalan is also written as Dhilwan, or Dhilwan Sodhian, which causes confusion among readers. Dhilwan Kalan is near Kotkapura in Faridkot district. A few other villages have identical or similar names, Dhilwan Khurd (Faridkot district), Dhilwan Wala (Moga district), Dhilwan (Barnala district), Dhilwan (Gurdaspur district).

== Demographics ==
As of 2011 India census, The Dhilwan Nagar Panchayat has population of 8,157 of which 4,225 are males while 3,932 are females as per report released by Census India 2011. Population of Children with age of 0-6 is 835 which is 10.24 % of total population of Dhilwan (NP).

== Transport ==
By Air: Dhilwan is located at 65 km far from Amritsar International airport, (Raja Sansi Airport) By Rail: Dhilwan railway station is located at 3 km far from main city By Road: Dhilwan is well connected to all major towns and cities of the state Bus Route: PRTC - Pepsu Road Transport Corporation provides regular buses to reach inter-city and inter-state regions.
