= Tulsi Samman =

Arts award

The Tulsi Samman is an arts award presented annually by the Government of Madhya Pradesh state in India. The award is named after Tulsidas, an Indian saint, poet and philosopher, best known as the author of Ramacharitamanas, an epic devoted to Rama, a major deity in Hinduism. This award is presented for outstanding achievement in one of the four categories of the tribal, traditional and folk arts. These categories are: art, theatre, dance and music.

== Recipients ==
The recipients of the Tulsi Samman include:

Year	Name
1983–84	Manna Dey
1983–84	Pandit Girraj Prasad
1983–84	Hirji Keshavji
1984–85	Bhagaban Sahu
1985–86	Neelamani Devi
1985–86	Ganga Devi
1986–87	Sona Bai
1987–88	Mani Madhava Chakyar
1987–88	Madanlal Nishaad, Govind Ram Nirmalkar, Nacha Theatre
1987–88	Bhulvaram Yadav
1987–88	Fida Bai Markam
1987–88	Devilal Nag
1988–89	V. Ganapati Sthapati
1988–89	N. Veerappan
1988–89	Jivya Soma Mashe
1988–89	The Yakshagana troupe, Udupi
1989–90	Sakar Khan
1989–90	Sadiq Khan
1989–90	Bada Ghazi Khan
1990–91	Balappa Hukkeri
1990–91	Balakrushna Dash
1990–91	Jhaduram Devangan
1991–92	Chamruram Baghel
1993–94	Kogga Devanna Kamath
1993–94	Arjun Singh Dhurve
1994–95	Belayudhan Nair
1994–95	Umagraj Khiladi
1995–96	Manguni Das
1995–96	Mahasundari Devi
1997–98	Swami Harigovind
1998–99	Om Prakash Taak
1999–2000	Puranchand and Pyarelal Wadali
2000–01	Purnachandra Das Baul
2001–02	Jonnalagadda Gurappa Chetty
2002–03	Ramkailash Yadav
2003–04	Ustad Ghulam Muhammad Saj Nawaj
2004–05	Prakash Chandra
2005–06	Swami Ramswaroop Sharma
2006–07	Lallu Vajpayee
2008–09	Shri Ranaswami Vedar
2009–10	Shri Jairam Das
2012–13	Shri ramsahay pandey
2016	Shri Bhikhudan Gadvi
2017	Kailash Chand Sharma
2018	Vikram yadav

== Notes ==
2008–09 rangaswami vedar

== See also ==
- Kalidas Samman
