= Ramidi =

- Village
- Location in Punjab, India Ramidi (India)
- Coordinates: 31.476452°N 75.395138°E
- Country: India
- State: Punjab
- District: Kapurthala

Government
  - Type: Panchayati raj (India)
  - Body: Gram panchayat

Population (2011)
  - Total: 1,949
- Sex ratio 996/953♂/♀

Languages
  - Official: Punjabi
  - Other spoken: Hindi
- Time zone: UTC+5:30 (IST)
- PIN: 144802
- ISO 3166 code: IN-PB
- Vehicle registration: PB-09
- Website: kapurthala.gov.in

Ramidi is a village in the Kapurthala district of Punjab State, India. It is located 12 kilometres (7.5 mi) from Kapurthala, which is both district and sub-district headquarters of Ramidi. The village is administered by a Sarpanch who is an elected representative of village as per the constitution of India and Panchayati raj.

It is one of the biggest village in the surrounding areas. It has various facilities such as a bank, government high school, paved roads, street lights, government water tank, various dairies, general grocery stores, dispensary, and gurudwaras (Sikh temples).

Ramidi was very famous for Kabaddi Players. Some famous Kabaddi players from Ramidi were Nirbhay Bal, Sarwan Singh Bal, Bagha Bal, Tarsem Bal, Sukha Bal, Tejpal Bal, Kindu Bal, Sona Bal, Beera Bal and at present Johal Bal. Kulbir Singh bal National Level champion in Athletic and Coach in Punjab Sports Department

Nageen Singh Bal of Ramidi, a School Principal is also very famous for long-distance running. He participitated in World Masters athletics in Finland in 55+ marathon.

Many people from Ramidi are permanently settled in Canada, USA, England, Europe, Australia and New Zealand.

Ramidi is formed by two brothers, so the village has two pattis, Daddu ki Patti & Jetha Patti. But there are three gurudwaras in the village. one in Dadu ki patti, another in Jetha Patti, and the third one is common one called Sant Sar Sahib which is located close to the main rail track (Jalandhar Amritsar).

People of Ramidi actively participated in the Indian farmers' protest (world's largest protest ever) held at the borders of Delhi in December 2020.

== Demography ==
According to the report published by Census India in 2011, Ramidi has a total number of 418 houses and a population of 1,949, which includes 996 males and 953 females. The literacy rate of Ramidi is 78.50%, higher than the state average of 75.84%. The population of children under the age of 6 years is 172, which is 8.83% of the total population of Ramidi, and the child sex ratio is approximately 933, higher than the state average of 846.

== Current Panchayat ==
After the elections of October 2024 the panchayat members of Ramidi are:

Sarpanch of RAMIDI: Ms. Amarjeet Kaur

Member from Ward No. 01: Ms. Gurmeet Kaur

Member from Ward No. 02: Mr. Sarvan Singh

Member from Ward No. 03: Mr. Surjeet Singh

Member from Ward No. 04: Mr. Baljeet Singh

Member from Ward No. 05: Mr. Sandeep Singh

Member from Ward No. 06: Ms. Kulwant Kaur

Member from Ward No. 07: Ms. Surjeet Kaur

Member from Ward No. 08: Ms. Joginder Kaur

Member from Ward No. 09: Mr. Sukhjit SIngh

== Population data ==
Particulars	Total	Male	Female
Total No. of Houses	418	-	-
Population	1,949	996	953
Child (0–6)	172	89	83
Schedule Caste	525	270	255
Schedule Tribe	0	0	0
Literacy	78.50 %	84.67 %	72.07 %
Total Workers	608	540	68
Main Worker	425	0	0
Marginal Worker	183	163	20
