= Chiheru =

- village
- Location in Punjab, India Chiheru (India)
- Coordinates: 31.2690°N 75.7021°E
- Country: India
- State: Punjab
- District: Kapurthala

Area
  - Total: 6 km^{2} (2.3 sq mi)

Population (2011)
  - Total: 2,458
  - Density: 410/km^{2} (1,100/sq mi)

Languages
  - Official: Punjabi
- Time zone: UTC+5:30 (IST)
- PIN: 144402
- Area Code: 01824
- Vehicle registration: PB-

Chiheru is a village in the district of Kapurthala, Punjab, India. Nearest cities are Phagwara and Jalandhar.

== Location ==
Chiheru is located just off to the East side of the National Highway 1 (India) (a.k.a. Grand Trunk Road, GT Road), and the Indian Railways line, the major transportation artery North-South of India and between New Delhi and Amritsar. Chiheru is 390 km North of New Delhi, 118 km NW of Chandigarh, and 90 km SE of Amritsar. The two nearby cities Phagwara is 8 km SE and Jalandhar is 14 km NW. The nearest railway stations for local traffic are in Chiheru (station code=CEU), Phagwara (station code=PGW), and Jalandhar (station code=JUC/JRC).

== Demographics ==
According to the 2011 census, by the Indian Government, Chiheru (#83) has 509 households, and a population of 2,458; 1248 males (51%), and 1210 females (49%).

Chaheru’s first residents were from the Deu clan. Originally Deu and Aulakh were brothers and two of five sons. They came from the Sankatra tribe, from the areas of Sankhatra narowal & Zafarwal & District of Sialkot, Punjab, now in Pakistan.

== Education ==
In the early 1900s, the first public Elementary School (up to grade 5) was built by the Maharaja of Kapurthala Jagatjit Singh. In the mid 1960s, the original building was demolished and a new larger building constructed. In 1974 it was upgraded to Middle school (Grade 8) by the Punjab Government, within the District of Kapurthala (school district 303), and in 1994 further upgraded to High School (Grade 10)

== History ==
In 1911, the work on the Chiheru railway station and the train line started, and in 1914 the line was opened for passenger traffic between Ludhiana and Jalandhar (a.k.a. Jullundur), through Chiheru, when the Sutlej River Bridge of 20 spans was completed.

Between 2012-2014, Chiheru's underground water supply and sewage system were installed. The project was funded by the villagers (local and international), and managed by Dr. Gurdev Gill.
