= Livingston Compagnia Aerea =

Italian airline

IATA	ICAO	Call sign
JN	NLV	SEAGULL
- Founded: 2011
- Commenced operations: 2012
- Ceased operations: 7 October 2014
- Operating bases: Milan–Malpensa; Rimini; Tirana
- Fleet size: 3
- Destinations: 30
- Headquarters: Cardano al Campo, Varese, Italy
- Website: www.livingstonair.it

Livingston Compagnia Aerea (legally New Livingston S.p.A.) was an airline with headquarters in Cardano al Campo and a main operational hub at Milan Malpensa Airport. It ceased operations on 7 October 2014.

== History ==
=== Establishment ===
Livingston Compagnia Aerea was founded on 16 December 2011, under the aegis of the entrepreneur Riccardo Toto (Aliadriatica/Air One founder), by taking over the name, the landing rights and some other assets from the liquidation process of the former Livingston Energy Flight. The airline started with charter operations across Europe, and the first flight took place on 31 March 2012, on the Milan Malpensa-Marsa Alam route, operated with an Airbus A320. The first long-haul flight took place on 19 December 2012, with an Airbus A330. After the Italian low-cost company Wind Jet collapsed in August 2012, Livingston announced that it would take over several routes.

=== Two years of expansion ===
On 27 October 2013, the company won the Sardinian territorial continuity tender, opening connections between Rome Fiumicino airport and Alghero–Fertilia airport, with three daily flights. On December 18, New Livingston announced new scheduled and charter flights to be opened in the following weeks: Bologna-Tirana, Milan-Malpensa to Tirana, Mombasa and Zanzibar, Rome Fiumicino to Skopje (Macedonia), Mombasa and Zanzibar, Turin-Moscow, Verona-Tirana.

As of 1 January 2014, Livingston had logged 20,500 flight hours, carried over 900,000 passengers, and reached over 100 destinations, having agreements with 30 Italian and foreign tour operators. On 12 February, the airline announced the expansion of its fleet, with the aim of reaching seven operational aircraft by the summer season. In the following weeks Livingston expanded its international network. Tirana Airport was linked to ten destinations in collaboration with the tour operator Fly Albania: Milan, Bergamo, Cuneo, Genoa, Verona, Venice, Bologna, Ancona, Rome, and London. A flight to Pristina (Kosovo) was added from Milan-Malpensa, Verona, Venice, and Bologna in collaboration with the ailing "Kosova Airlines". Flights to Moscow and St. Petersburg departed from Verona and Rimini, with the aim of expanding air connections from other Italian cities to Russia, including Alghero, starting in the summer season. Livingston also operated charter flights in collaboration with Italian and foreign tour operators, to destinations in Italy itself, Greece, Spain, Egypt, Israel, Tunisia, England, and Ireland, with departures from multiple Italian airports.

=== Crisis and closure ===
On 6 June 2014, New Livingston was forced to cease scheduled flights between Rome Fiumicino and Alghero due to "serious contractual breaches" identified by the Sardinia regional government, the Sardinia Regional Administrative Court, and the Council of State. On 25 June, ENAC announced the suspension of the air operator's certificate, effective 14 July 14, but on 30 June, ENAC itself reinstated the license. The airline continued its operations but the crisis was already underway. On 7 October, the airline ceased flight operations due to financial problems. One day later, the ENAC revoked the airline's operating license. On 29 March 2015, the Busto Arsizio court declared the company insolvent, initiating insolvency proceedings.

== Destinations ==
This is the network of scheduled destinations that was operated as of summer 2014 and planned winter 2014/2015 scheduled and charter destinations before the shutdown of operations.

^{[Base]}	Hub
^{[S]}	Seasonal
^{[T]}	Terminated destination

City	Country	IATA	ICAO	Airport	Refs
Alghero	Italy	AHO	LIEA	Fertilia Airport ^{[T]}	
Ancona	Italy	AOI	LIPY	Ancona Airport ^{[T]}	
Bologna	Italy	BLQ	LIPE	Guglielmo Marconi Airport	
Cuneo	Italy	CUF	LIMZ	Cuneo International Airport	
Djerba	Tunisia	DJE	DTTJ	Djerba–Zarzis International Airport ^{[S]}	
Ibiza	Spain	IBZ	LEIB	Ibiza Airport ^{[S]}	
Karpathos	Greece	AOK	LGKP	Karpathos Island National Airport ^{[S]}	
Kyiv	Ukraine	KBP	UKBB	Boryspil International Airport	
Kos	Greece	KGS	LGKO	Kos Island International Airport ^{[S]}	
Lampedusa	Italy	LMP	LICD	Lampedusa Airport ^{[S]}	
London	United Kingdom	LGW	EGKK	London Gatwick Airport	
Menorca	Spain	MAH	LEMH	Menorca Airport ^{[S]}	
Milan	Italy	MXP	LIMC	Milan Malpensa Airport ^{[Base]}	
Milan	Italy	BGY	LIME	Orio al Serio Airport	
Mombasa	Kenya	MBA	HKMO	Moi International Airport ^{[T]}	
Monastir	Tunisia	MIR	DTMB	Monastir Habib Bourguiba International Airport ^{[S]}	
Moscow	Russia	DME	UUDD	Domodedovo International Airport	
Mostar	Bosnia and Herzegovina	OMO	LQMO	Mostar International Airport	
Palma de Mallorca	Spain	PMI	LEPA	Palma de Mallorca Airport ^{[S]}	
Pantelleria	Italy	PNL	LICG	Pantelleria Airport ^{[S]}	
Pisa	Italy	PSA	LIRP	Galileo Galilei Airport	
Rimini	Italy	RMN	LIPR	Federico Fellini International Airport ^{[Base]}	
Rome	Italy	FCO	LIRF	Leonardo da Vinci-Fiumicino Airport	
Rostov-on-Don	Russia	ROV	URRR	Rostov-on-Don Airport	
Rovaniemi	Finland	RVN	EFRO	Rovaniemi Airport ^{[T]}	
Tirana	Albania	TIA	LATI	Tirana International Airport ^{[Base]}	
Turin	Italy	TRN	LIMF	Turin Airport ^{[S]}	
Ufa	Russia	UFA	UWUU	Ufa International Airport	
Verona	Italy	VRN	LIPX	Villafranca Airport	
Zanzibar	Tanzania	ZNZ	HTZA	Abeid Amani Karume International Airport ^{[T]}	

== Fleet ==
As of October 2014, Livingston Compagnia Aerea fleet consisted of the following aircraft, all of them returned to their lessors:

Livingston Compagnia Aerea fleet
Aircraft	In fleet	Passengers			
Aircraft	In fleet	J	Y+	Y	Total
Airbus A320-200	3	0	0	180	180
Total	3	0			

Aircraft	Image	Total	Introduced	Retired	Remark
Airbus A320-200		6	2012	2015	
Airbus A330-200		2	2012	2014	leased

== See also ==
- Transport in Italy
- List of airports in Italy
- List of companies of Italy
