= Dhilwan Kalan =

- village
- Interactive map of Dhilwan Kalan
- Location in Punjab, India Dhilwan Kalan (India)
- Coordinates: 30.571758°N 74.865452°E
- Country: India
- State: Punjab
- District: Faridkot

Languages
  - Official: Punjabi
- Time zone: UTC+5:30 (IST)
- Nearest city: Kotkapura

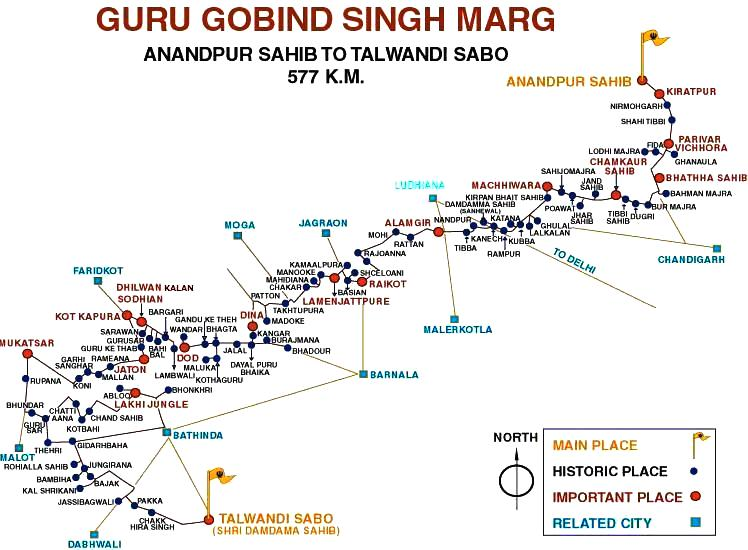

Dhilwan Kalan is a village situated on Bathinda-Baja Khana-Faridkot main road approximately 5 km from Kotkapura in Faridkot district, India. The area of the village is approximately 2566 hectare and the population 9210. Some of the residents of this village, due to ancestral land inheritance, moved to village called Dhilwan Khurd near Sadik. Residents of this village are well-educated and settled in foreign countries. The region also facing serious agricultural and socio economic hardships after 1991.

The population of this village is dominated by three main segments, Jat Sikh (Dhillon, Dhaliwal, Sidhu/Brar, Bhullar and Gill), Buttar Ramgharia, and Harijan. In addition, other segments of population represented as part of community are Sodhi, Khatri, Mahajan, Darji, Ramdasia, Bajigar and Boria (Punjab).

== History ==
Dhilwan Kalan has historical importance in the Sikh Religion and Sikh History for standing with the 10th Sikh Guru's side during very difficult and testing times, while the Nawab of nearby town Kotkapura did not openly support Guru Gobind Singh Ji. Kalan is Persian language word which means Big.

Guru Gobind Singh Ji, the 10th Guru of the Sikhs en route from Machhiwara, after staying at Dina and short stopover at various other places reached Kotkapura and asked the Nawab Kapura Brar for his fort to fight the pursuing Mughal Army. Nawab refused the fort to the Guru. After refusal from Kapura Brar Guru Gobind Singh Ji reached Dhilwan Kalan (at that time called Dhilwan Sodhian) where his relatives received him with great cordiality. At Dhilwan Kalan, one of the Prithi Chand's descendants, Kaul Sodhi, presented Guru Ji clothes. The Guru Ji took off his blue robe which he had been wearing since he left Machiwara, and tearing it piece by piece burned it in fire. The historic words that he is said to have uttered on this occasion are memorable: "I have torn the blue clothes which I wore, and with that the rule of the Turks and Pathans is at an end." Some historians think that Guru Ji said "Turks, Pathans and Kapuras". It is believed that Guru Gobind Singh Ji stayed couple of days at Dhilwan Kalan village in the house of Sodhi Kaul on his request. On Kaul's request, Guruji discarded his blue dress and changed to white dress. Descendants of Kaul Sodhi's family claim that Guru Ji gave a "topi" believed to be of the first Guru Nanak Dev Ji and a “chola" (cloak), socks and turban, two daggers believed to belonging to Guru Gobind Singh Ji, which is still in their custody.

Later Chaudhry Kapura being repentant of his disgraceful act being Sikh and not helping Guru Gobind Singh came to see the Guru and asked for his forgiveness. Guru ji moved from Dhilwan Kalan to Talwandi Sabo (Damdama Sahib) via Muktsar (Khidarne Di Dhaab) where Guru Gobind Singh Ji fought last battle with Mughals.

Some believes that historic words of Guru Gobind Singh Ji about Kapura's were true. A dispute in Nawab Kapura's grandsons occurred shortly after that, which led to the division of state, with Jodh Singh Brar retaining control of Kot Kapura, and his younger brother Hamir Singh Brar retaining control of Faridkot, which later was known as Faridkot Ryast in British Rule. Nawab Kapura's state was captured in 1803 by Maharaja Ranjit Singh but later returned to British/Kapura's due to 1809 treaty between Maharaja Ranjit Singh and British. During the wars between Sikhs and British in 1845, Pahara Singh Brar from the Kapura's ancestral background aided the British by providing secret intelligence information to the British Army. Pahar Singh Brar was rewarded with additional area under his control of Faridkot Ryast after British capture of Sikh Kingdom of Maharaja Ranjit Singh. Raja Harinder Singh Brar was the last king of Faridkot Ryast before independence of India in 1947. Raja Harinder Singh Brar's son died issueless.

Gurudwara in the memory of Guru Gobind Singh Ji's visit to Dhilwan Kalan is situated at about 200m in the east of village and called Gurdwara Godavari Sahib. Guru Gobind Singh Ji took bath in sarover and changed cloths provided by the resident of the village. Guru Ji named the village sarover as "Godavari Sar". Guru Ji announced that dip in this sarover now a "Holy Sarover of Gurdwara" will bear the same pilgrimage as taking a holy dip in the Godavari River a sacred river in Central India near Nanded. The Godavari River has been held as a special place of pilgrimage for many thousands of years in Central India. Dip in the Holy Godavari River is considered sacred in Central India, similar to holy dip in Ganges River in Northern India by Hindus.

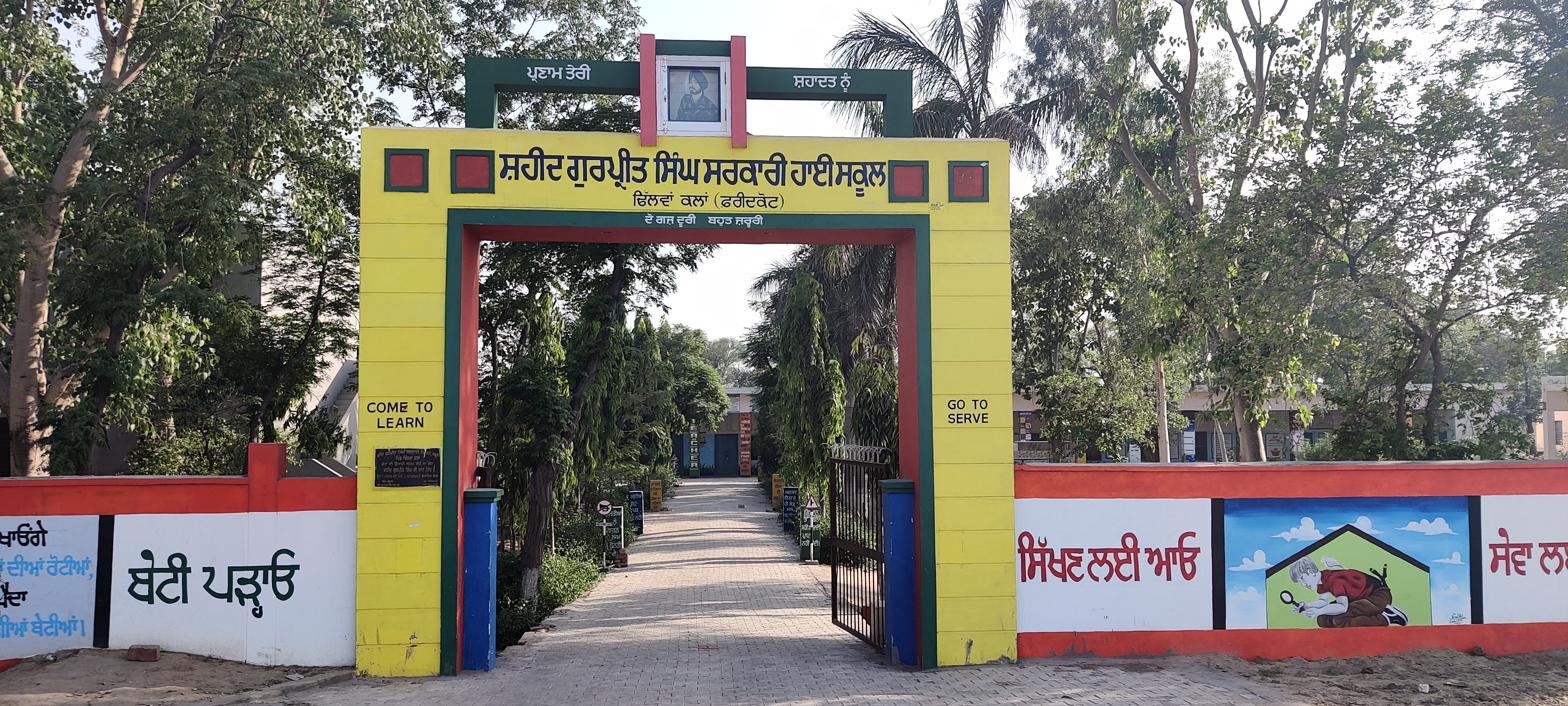
Entrance of Govt. High School Dhilwan Kalan (Faridkot)
