= Sirhind railway station =

Railway station in Punjab, India

Sirhind Junction
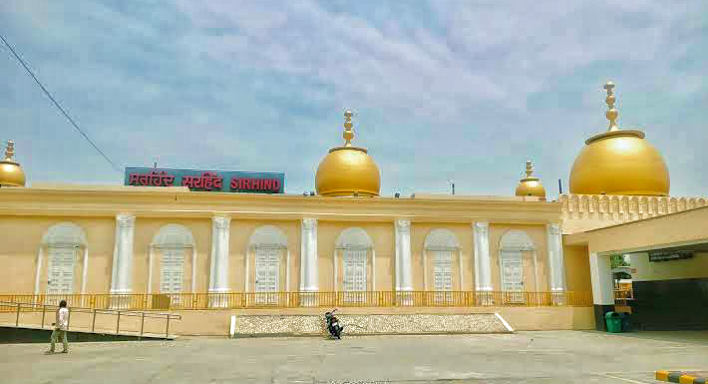
- Sirhind Junction Main Entrance

General information
- Location: Main Market, Sirhind, Punjab; India
- Coordinates: 30°37′27″N 76°22′56″E
- Elevation: 271 metres (889 ft)
- System: Indian Railways junction station
- Owner: Ministry of Railways (India)
- Operator: Indian Railways
- Lines: Ambala–Attari line; Sirhind–Una-Mukerian line
- Platforms: 3
- Tracks: 7 5 ft 6 in (1,676 mm) broad gauge

Construction
- Structure type: At grade
- Parking: Yes
- Cycle facilities: No

Other information
- Status: Functioning
- Station code: SIR
- Zone(s): Northern Railway
- Division(s): Ambala

History
- Opened: 1870
- Electrified: 1995-1996

Services
Preceding station	Indian Railways	Following station
Sadhoo Garh towards ?	Northern Railway zone Ambala–Attari line	Mandi Gobindgarh towards ?
Terminus	Northern Railway zone Sirhind–Nangal line	Fatehgarh Sahib towards ?
Location
- Location within Punjab Location within India

Sirhind Junction railway station is located in Fatehgarh Sahib district in the Indian state of Punjab and serves Sirhind & Fatehgarh Sahib. Sirhind Junction is situated on Attari–Delhi line and connect Sirhind–Una line. Sirhind Junction comes under Northern Railway zone in Ambala railway division.

== The railway station ==
Sirhind railway station is at an elevation of 271 metres (889 ft) and was assigned the code – SIR.

== History ==
The Scinde, Punjab & Delhi Railway completed the 483 km (300 mi)-long Amritsar–Ambala–Saharanpur–Ghaziabad line in 1870 connecting Multan (now in Pakistan) with Delhi.

The Sirhind–Nangal line was opened in 1927.

== Electrification ==
The Shahbad Markanda-Mandi Gobindgarh sector was electrified in 1995–96.
