= Mandi Gobindgarh railway station =

Railway station in Punjab, India

Mandi Gobindgarh

General information
- Location: Mandi Gobindgarh, Punjab; India
- Coordinates: 30°40′10″N 76°17′51″E
- Elevation: 268 metres (879 ft)
- System: Indian Railways station
- Owner: Indian Railways
- Operator: Northern Railway
- Line: Ambala–Attari line
- Platforms: 2

Construction
- Structure type: Standard on ground
- Parking: Yes
- Cycle facilities: No

Other information
- Status: Functioning
- Station code: GVG
- Division(s): Ambala

History
- Opened: 1870
- Electrified: 1995–96

Services
Preceding station	Indian Railways	Following station
Sirhind towards ?	Northern Railway zone Ambala–Attari line	Khanna towards ?
Location
- Location within Punjab

Mandi Gobindgarh railway station is located in Fatehgarh Sahib district in the Indian state of Punjab and serves the steel town of Mandi Gobindgarh .

== The railway station ==
Mandi Gobindgarh railway station is at an elevation of 268 metres (879 ft) and was assigned the code – GVG.

== History ==
The Scinde, Punjab & Delhi Railway completed the 483 km (300 mi)-long Amritsar–Ambala–Saharanpur–Ghaziabad line in 1870 connecting Multan (now in Pakistan) with Delhi.

== Electrification ==
The Shahbad Markanda-Mandi Gobindgarh sector was electrified in 1995–96.
