= Phagwara Junction railway station =

Railway station in India

Phagwara Junction
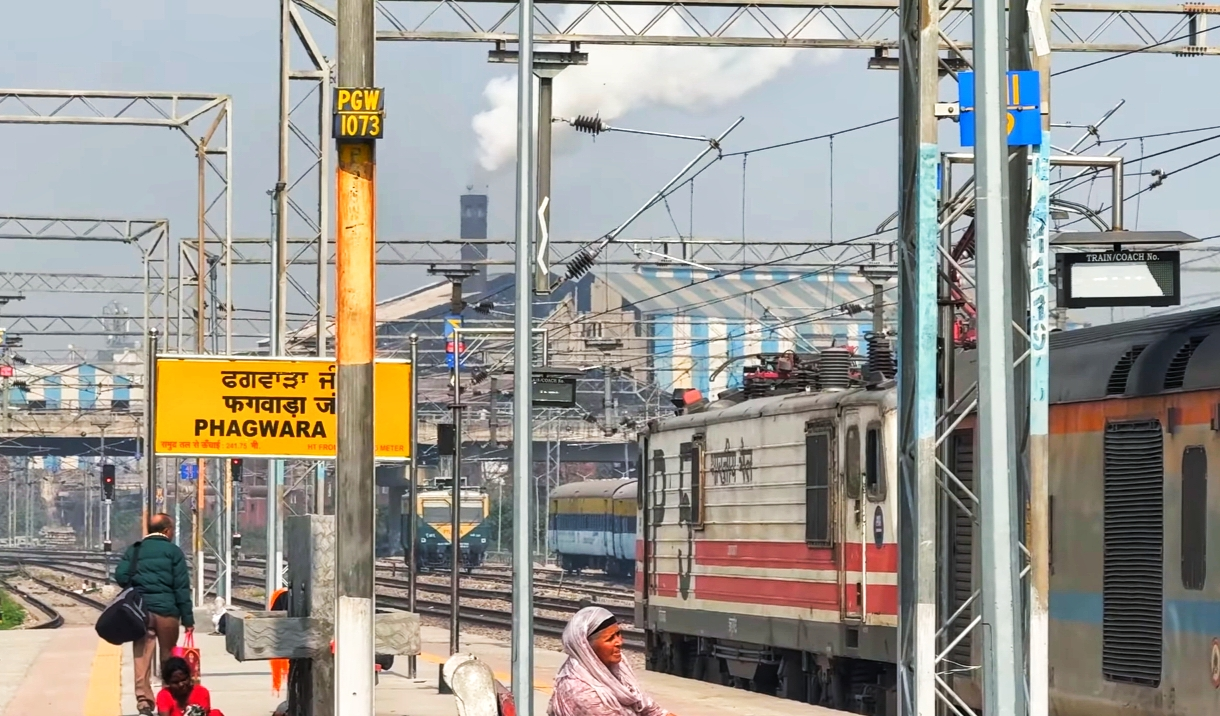
- New Delhi–Amritsar Shatabdi Express At Phagwara Junction

General information
- Location: NH 1, Prem Nagar, Phagwara, Kapurthala district, Punjab; India
- Coordinates: 31°13′01″N 74°45′54″E
- Elevation: 245 metres (804 ft)
- System: Indian Railways junction station
- Owner: Indian Railways
- Operator: Northern Railways
- Lines: Ambala–Attari line, Phagwara–Jaijon Doaba line
- Platforms: 3
- Tracks: 5 5 ft 6 in (1,676 mm) broad gauge

Construction
- Structure type: At grade
- Parking: Yes
- Cycle facilities: No

Other information
- Status: Functioning
- Station code: PGW
- Zone(s): Northern Railway
- Division(s): Firozpur

History
- Opened: 1870

Services
Preceding station	Indian Railways	Following station
Mauli Halt towards ?	Northern Railway zone Ambala–Attari line	Chiheru towards ?
Terminus	Northern Railway zone Phagwara–Jaijon Doaba line	Bahram towards ?
Location
- Location within Punjab

Phagwara Junction railway station is located on Ambala–Attari line in Kapurthala district in the Indian state of Punjab and serves the textile town of Phagwara.

== The railway station ==
Phagwara railway station is at an elevation of 245 metres (804 ft) and was assigned the code PGW.

== History ==
The Scinde, Punjab & Delhi Railway completed the 483 km (300 mi)-long Amritsar–Ambala–Saharanpur–Ghaziabad line in 1870 connecting Multan (now in Pakistan) with Delhi.

== Electrification ==
The Phillaur–Phagwara sector was electrified in 2002–03, and the Phagwara–Jallandhar City–Amritsar sector in 2003–04.
