= Phillaur Junction railway station =

Rail station in Punjab, India

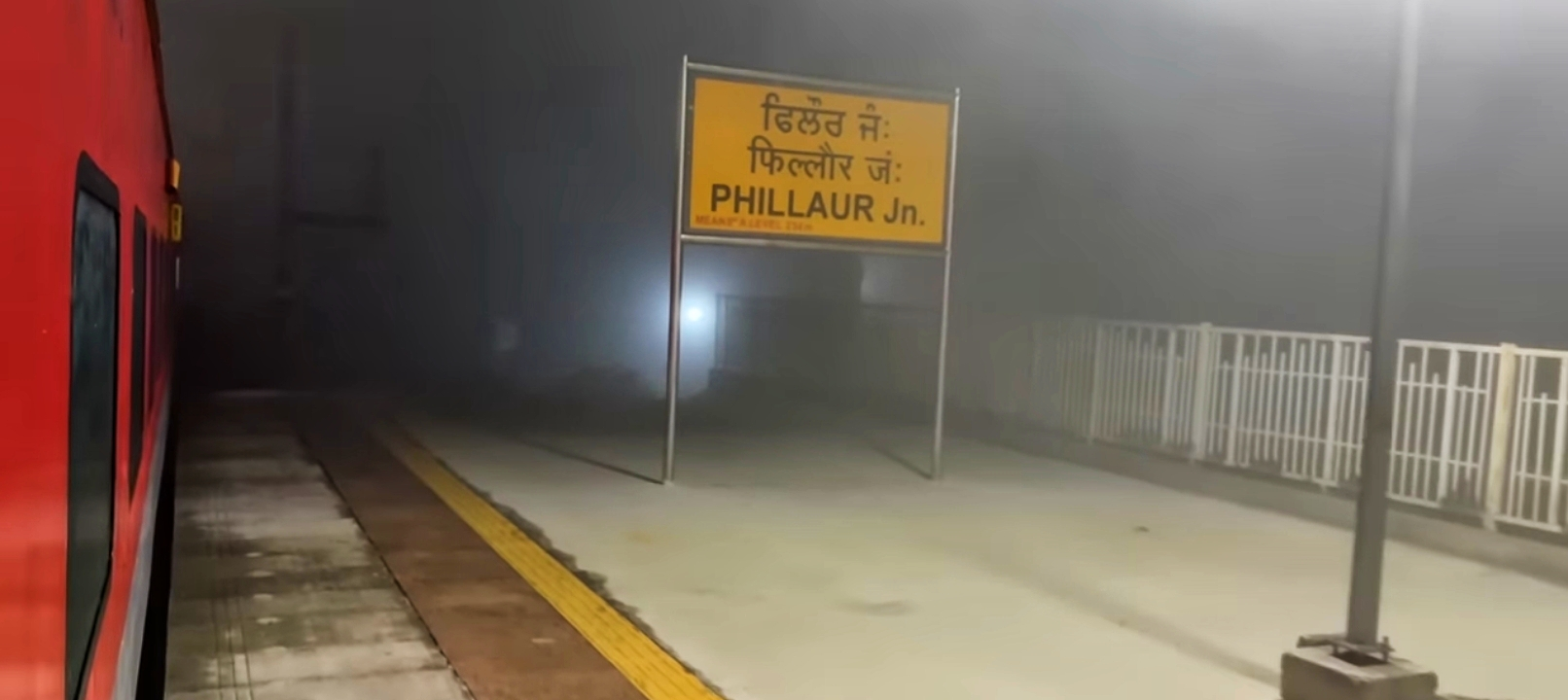
- Phillaur Junction Railway Station

General information
- Location: NH 1, Phillaur, Jalandhar district, Punjab; India
- Coordinates: 31°01′01″N 75°47′10″E
- Elevation: 243 metres (797 ft)
- System: Indian Railways station
- Owner: Indian Railways
- Operator: Northern Railway
- Line: Ambala–Attari line Phillaur–Lohian Khas line
- Platforms: 3
- Tracks: 5

Construction
- Structure type: Standard (on-ground station)
- Platform levels: At ground
- Parking: Yes
- Cycle facilities: Yes

Other information
- Status: Double electric line
- Station code: PHR
- Zone(s): Northern Railway
- Division(s): Firozpur
Location
- Location within Punjab Location within India

Phillaur Junction railway station is an important railway station in Jalandhar district, Punjab. Its code is PHR. It serves Phillaur city. The station consists of three platforms. The platforms are well sheltered. It has many facilities including water and sanitation.

== Platforms ==
There are a total of three platforms and five tracks. The platforms are connected by foot overbridge. These platforms are built to accumulate express trains of twenty-four coaches. The platforms are equipped with modern facilities including train arrival and departure display boards. It is a Junction for Nakodar, Lohian Khas and Ferozpur Cantt.

== Station layout ==
G	Street level	Exit/Entrance & ticket counter
P1	FOB, Side platform, No-1 doors will open on the left/right
P1	Track 1	← toward →
P1	Track 2	→ toward →
P1	FOB, Island platform, No- 2 doors will open on the left/right
P1	Island platform, No- 3 doors will open on the left/right
P1	Track 3	toward →
Track 4	For freight trains
Track 5	For freight trains

== See also ==
- Phillaur
- Indian Railways
- Punjab, India
- Ambala–Attari line
- Ludhiana Junction railway station
- List of railway stations in India
