= Jalandhar City Junction railway station =

Rail station in Punjab, India

Jalandhar City Junction
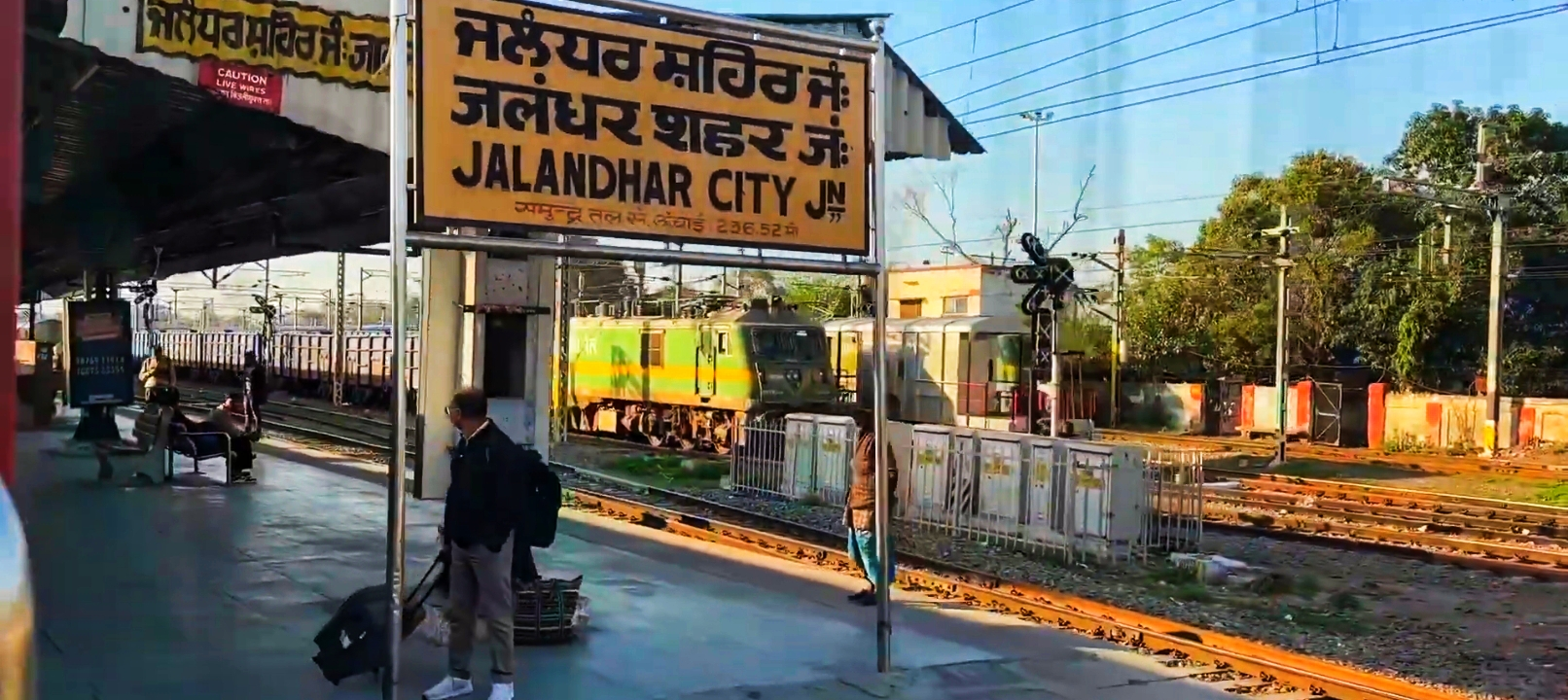
- Jalandhar City junction Railway station

General information
- Location: Street No. 1, Gobindgarh, Arjun Nagar, Jalandhar, Punjab; India
- Coordinates: 31°19′52″N 75°35′28″E
- Elevation: 236.520 metres (775.98 ft)
- System: Indian Railways junction station
- Owner: Indian Railways
- Operator: Northern Railway
- Lines: Ambala–Attari line, Jalandhar–Jammu line, Jalandhar–Firozpur line
- Platforms: 5 (Including 2 terminating platforms)
- Tracks: 16 5 ft 6 in (1,676 mm) broad gauge

Construction
- Structure type: At grade
- Parking: Yes
- Cycle facilities: Yes

Other information
- Status: Functioning
- Station code: JUC
- Zone(s): Northern Railway
- Division(s): Firozpur

History
- Opened: 1864
- Electrified: 1997

Services
Preceding station	Indian Railways	Following station
Jalandhar Cantonment towards ?	Northern Railway zone Ambala–Attari line	Baba Sodhal Nagar towards ?
Terminus	Northern Railway zone Jalandhar–Firozpur line	Kapurthala towards ?
Terminus	Northern Railway zone Jalandhar–Nakoar line	Rail Coach Factory Kapurthala(Halt) towards ?
Terminus	Northern Railway zone Jalandhar–Jammu line	Hussainpur towards ?
Location
- Location within Punjab Location within India
- Interactive map

Jalandhar City Junction (station code: JUC) is a railway station located in Jalandhar district in the Indian state of Punjab and serves Jalandhar.

== The railway station ==
Jalandhar City railway station is at an elevation of 236.520 metres (775.98 ft) and was assigned the code – JUC.

== History ==
The Scinde, Punjab & Delhi Railway completed the 483 km (300 mi) long Amritsar–Ambala–Saharanpur–Ghaziabad line in 1870 connecting Multan (now in Pakistan) with Delhi.

The line from Jalandhar City to Mukerian was constructed in 1915. The Mukerian–Pathankot line was built in 1952, The construction of the Pathankot–Jammu Tawi line was initiated in 1965, after the Indo-Pakistani War of 1965, and opened in 1971.

The Firozpur Cantonment-Jalandhar City branch line was opened in 1912.

== Electrification ==
The electrification of Phagwara–Jalandhar Cantt–Jalandhar City–Amritsar sector was initiated in 1997.

== DMU shed ==
India's first and largest DMU shed at Jalandhar holds 90 units placed in service in whole Punjab. It also houses two BEML-built rail buses which operate on the Beas–Goindwal Sahib line. In 2019, it completed 50 years of service and was converted into an electric shed MEMU and allotted 2 new rakes of MEMU train including medical relief van.

== Passenger movement ==
Jalandhar City is amongst the top hundred booking stations of Indian Railway.

== Amenities ==
Jalandhar City railway station has computerized reservation counters, GRP (railway police) office, retiring rooms, vegetarian and non-vegetarian refreshment rooms and book stall.
