= Ambala–Attari line =

Railway line in India

Ambala–Attari line including Hoshiarpur branch line
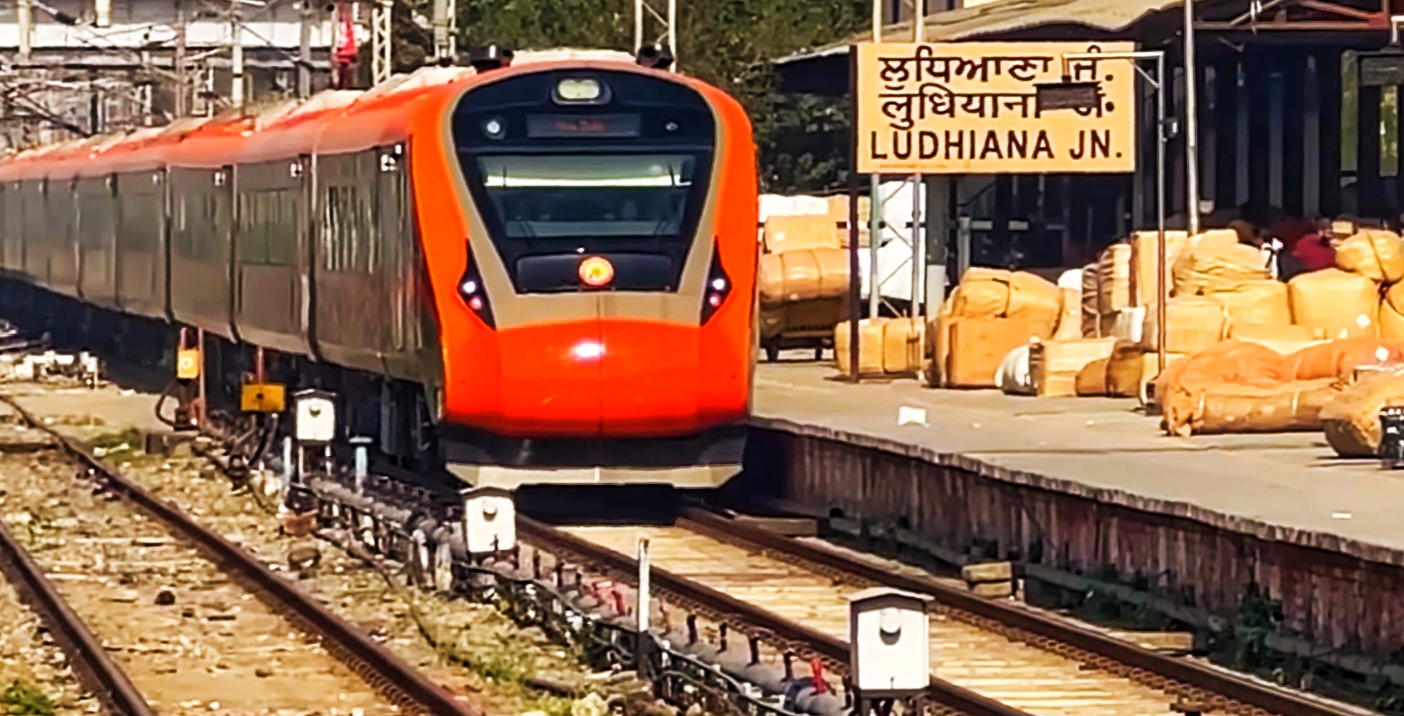
- Ludhiana Junction is an Important Railway Station on Ambala–Attari line

Overview
- Status: Operational
- Owner: Indian Railways
- Locale: Haryana, Punjab
- Termini: Ambala; Attari

Service
- Operator: Northern Railway

History
- Opened: 1870

Technical
- Track length: 273 km (170 mi)
- Number of tracks: 2
- Track gauge: 5 ft 6 in (1,676 mm) broad gauge
- Electrification: 25 kV 50 Hz AC OHLE in 1995–2004
- Highest elevation: Ambala Cantonment 272.530 m (894 ft), Attari 220 m (722 ft)

The Ambala–Attari line is a railway line connecting Ambala Cantonment in the Indian state of Haryana and Attari in Punjab. The line is under the administrative jurisdiction of Northern Railway.

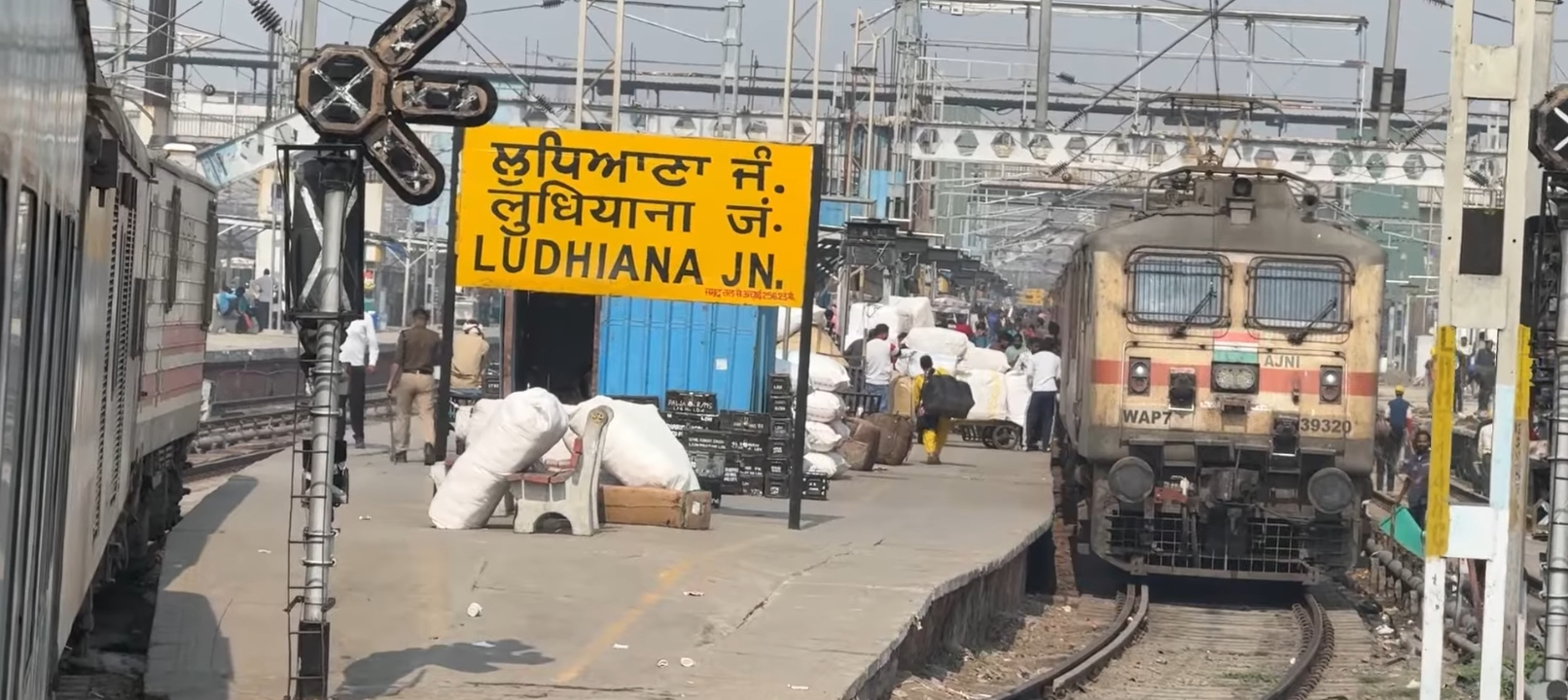
Ludhiana junction

== History ==
The Scinde, Punjab & Delhi Railway completed the Multan–Lahore–Amritsar line in 1865 and the 483 km (300 mi)-long Amritsar–Ambala–Saharanpur–Ghaziabad line in 1870 connecting Multan (now in Pakistan) with Delhi. Amritsar–Attari section was completed on the route to Lahore in 1862.

Hoshiarpur was linked by rail with Jullundur Cantonment in 1913.

== Electrification ==
The Ambala–Amritsar sector is electrified. It was electrified in parts. The Shahbad Markanda-Mandi Gobindgarh sector was electrified in 1995–96, the Mandi Gobindgarh–Ludhiana sector in 1996–97, the Phillaur–Phagwara sector in 2002–03, and the Phagwara–Jallandhar City–Amritsar in 2003–04.

== Sheds and workshops ==
Ambala has an outstation shed for Shakurbasti WDS-4 diesel locos. Ludhiana diesel shed holds 170+ locos including WDM-2, WDM-3A and WDG-3A. Electric Loco Shed, Ludhiana was commissioned in 2001 and houses WAM-4, WAG-5 and WAG-7 locos. India's first and largest DMU shed at Jalandhar holds 90 units placed in service in rural Punjab. It also houses two BEML-built rail buses that operate on the Beas–Goindwal Sahib line. Amritsar workshop carries out periodic overhaul of WDS-4 locos and breakdown cranes and bogie manufacture.

== Tracks and speed limit ==
The Ambala Cantonment–Ludhiana–Amritsar line is classified as a "Group B" line and can take speeds up to 130 km/ h.

It is a double-line track. There is a third line between Sahnewal and Ludhiana.

== Passenger movement ==
Ambala Cantonment, Ludhiana, Jalandhar City and Amritsar, on this line, are amongst the top hundred booking stations of Indian Railway.

== Railway reorganisation ==
Sind Railway (later reorganised as Sind, Punjab and Delhi Railway) was formed a guaranteed railway in 1856. It constructed broad-gauge railways from Delhi to Multan via Lahore, and from Karachi to Kotri. Multan and Kotri were connected by ferry service on the Indus River. In 1871–72, Indus Valley Railway was formed to connect Multan and Kotri. At the same time, Punjab Northern State Railway started constructing from Lahore towards Peshawar. In 1886, Sind, Punjab and Delhi Railway was acquired by the state and amalgamated with Indus Valley Railway and Punjab Northern State Railway to form North-Western State Railway.

With the partition of India in 1947, North Western Railway was split. While the western portion became Pakistan West Railway, and later Pakistan Railways, the eastern part became Eastern Punjab Railway. In 1952, Northern Railway was formed with a portion of East Indian Railway Company west of Mughalsarai, Jodhpur Railway, Bikaner Railway and Eastern Punjab Railway.
