= Kolkata–Jammu Tawi Express =

Train in India

Kolkata-Jammu Tawi Express
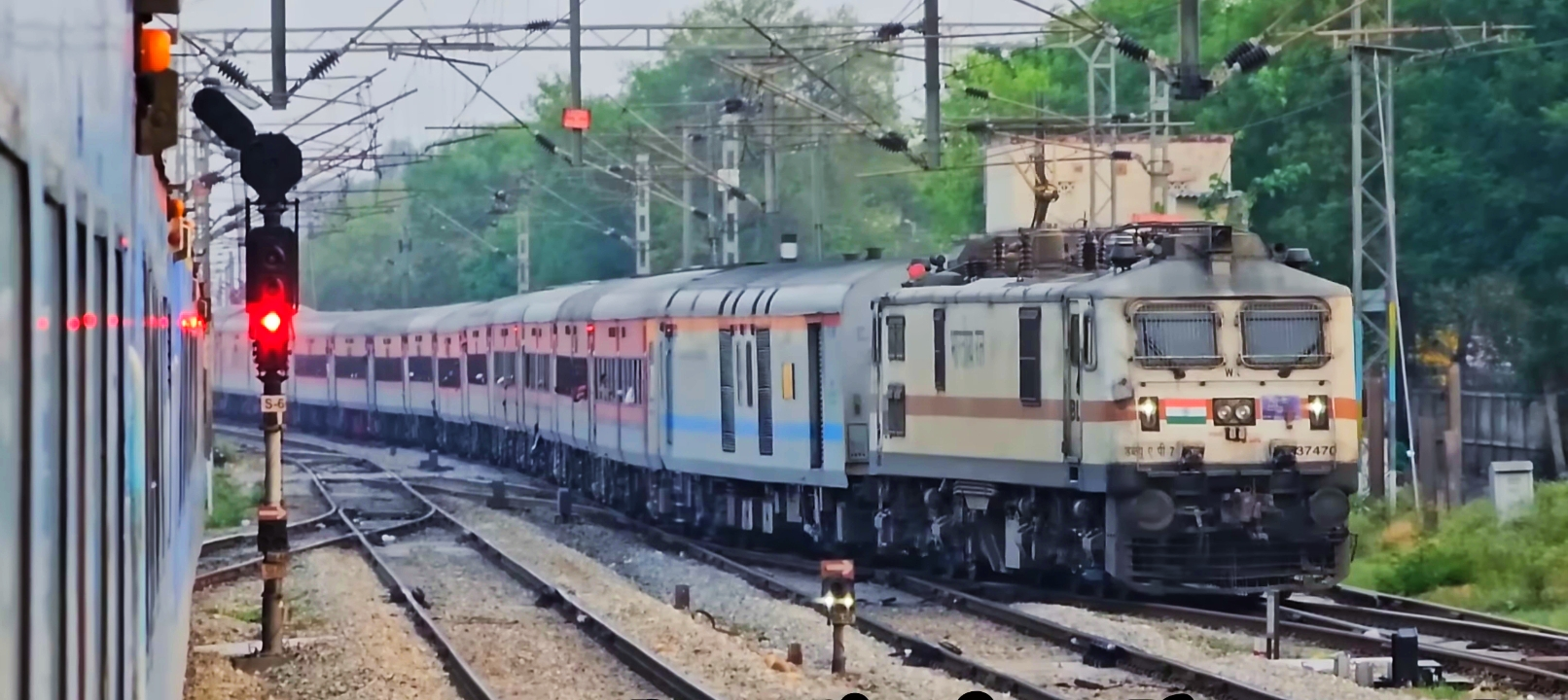
- Kolkata-Jammu Tawi Expres Arriving At Phagwara Junction railway station

Overview
- Service type: Express
- First service: 1 June 1913; 113 years ago
- Current operator: Eastern Railway

Route
- Termini: Kolkata (KOAA); Jammu Tawi (JAT)
- Stops: 78
- Distance travelled: 1,988 km (1,235 mi)
- Average journey time: 45hrs 05mins
- Service frequency: Daily
- Train number: 13151 / 13152

On-board services
- Classes: AC 2 Tier, AC 3 Tier, Sleeper Class, General Unreserved
- Seating arrangements: Yes
- Sleeping arrangements: Yes
- Catering facilities: Available
- Observation facilities: Large windows
- Baggage facilities: Available
- Other facilities: Below the seats

Technical
- Rolling stock: LHB coach
- Track gauge: 1,676 mm (5 ft 6 in)
- Operating speed: 44 km/h (27 mph) average including halts.

The 13151 / 13152 Kolkata-Jammu Tawi Express is an Express train of the Indian Railways connecting Kolkata in West Bengal and Jammu Tawi in Jammu and Kashmir. It is currently being operated with 13151/13152 train numbers on a daily basis.

== Service ==
It averages 45 km/h as 13151 Kolkata - Jammu Tawi Express and covers 1986 km in 45 hrs 5 mins & 45 km/h as 13152 Jammu Tawi - Kolkata Express and covers 1986 km in 45 hrs.

== Route and halts ==
The important halts of the train are :

- Kolkata
- Dakshineswar
- Kamarkundu
- Barddhaman Junction
- Panagarh
- Durgapur
- Andal Junction
- Rani Ganj
- Asansol Junction
- Kulti
- Barakar
- Kumardabi
- Dhanbad Junction
- Netaji Subhas Chandra Bose Gomoh
- Parasnath
- Hazaribagh Road
- Parsabad
- koderma Junction
- Paharpur
- Tankuppa
- Gaya Junction
- Gurau
- Rafiganj
- Jhakim
- Phesar
- Anugraha Narayan Road
- Dehri on sone
- Sasaram Junction
- Kudra
- Bhabua road
- Pandit Deen Dayal Upadhyaya Junction
- Kashi
- Varanasi Junction
- Jaunpur Junction
- Shahganj Junction
- Malipur
- Akbarpur Junction
- Goshain Ganj
- Ayodhya dham junction
- Ayodhya Cantonment Junction
- Sohawal
- Rudauli
- Daryabad
- Safdarganj
- Barabunki Junction
- Lucknow Charbagh
- Sandila
- Balamau Junction
- Hardoi
- Roza Junction
- Shahjahanpur
- Tilhar
- Pitambarpur
- Bareilly Junction
- ClutterbuckGunj
- Milak
- Rampur Junction
- Moradabad Junction
- Seohara
- Dhampur
- Nagina
- Najiabad Junction
- Laksar Junction
- Roorkee
- Saharanpur Junction
- Yamunanagar Jagadhari
- Jagadhari workshop
- Ambala Cantonment Junction
- Ambala City
- Rajpura Junction
- Sirhind Junction
- Khanna
- Ludhiana Junction
- Phillaur Junction
- Phagwara Junction
- Jalandhar Cantonment Junction
- Mukerian
- Pathankot Cantonment
- Kathua
- Jammu Tawi.

== Coach positioning ==
Positioning for 13151 is LOCO-EOG-A1-B1-B2-B3-B4-B5-M1-PC-S1-S2-S3-S4-S5-S6-S7-GS-GS-GS-GS-EOG

Positioning for 13152 is LOCO-EOG-GS-GS-GS-GS-S7-S6-S5-S4-S3-S2-S1-PC-M1-B5-B4-B3-B2-B1-A1-EOG

== Traction ==
Both trains are hauled by a Howrah Loco Shed Sealdah Loco shed based WAP-7 electric locomotive from end to end.

== Coach composition ==
The train uses 5 dedicated LHB rakes. It has 21 coaches. The coach composition is as follows:

For 13151 (KOAA-JAT)

- 2 Generator Car (1 at each end)
- 3 Unreserved (only at front)
- 8 Sleeper Class
- 1 Pantry Car
- 1 AC 3-tier Economy Coach
- 5 AC 3-tier Coaches
- 1 AC 2-tier Coach

For 13152 (JAT-KOAA)

- 2 Generator Car
- 1 AC 2-tier Coach
- 5 AC 3-tier Coaches
- 1 AC 3-tier Economy Coach
- 1 Pantry Car
- 8 Sleeper Coaches
- 3 Unreserved Coach (Only at back)

It is to be kept in mind that 2 out of the 5 rakes of 13151/52 run with the exact opposite coach composition i.e. regular 13152 composition in 13151 and vice versa. So check the coach composition at station and hear out the announcements.

== Operation ==
13151 - Starts Kolkata Station at 11:45 AM IST Daily and reaches Jammu Tawi on 3rd Day at 9:00 AM IST.

13152 - Starts Jammu Tawi at 6:55 PM IST Daily and reaches Kolkata on 3rd Day at 3:45 PM IST.

== See also ==
- Begampura Express
- Archana Express
- Himgiri Superfast Express

== History ==
Earlier this train used to originate from Sealdah. But as Kolkata Chitpur Terminus was built this train was shifted to Kolkata (KOAA).
