= Chabahar Port =

Chabahar Port بندر چابهار
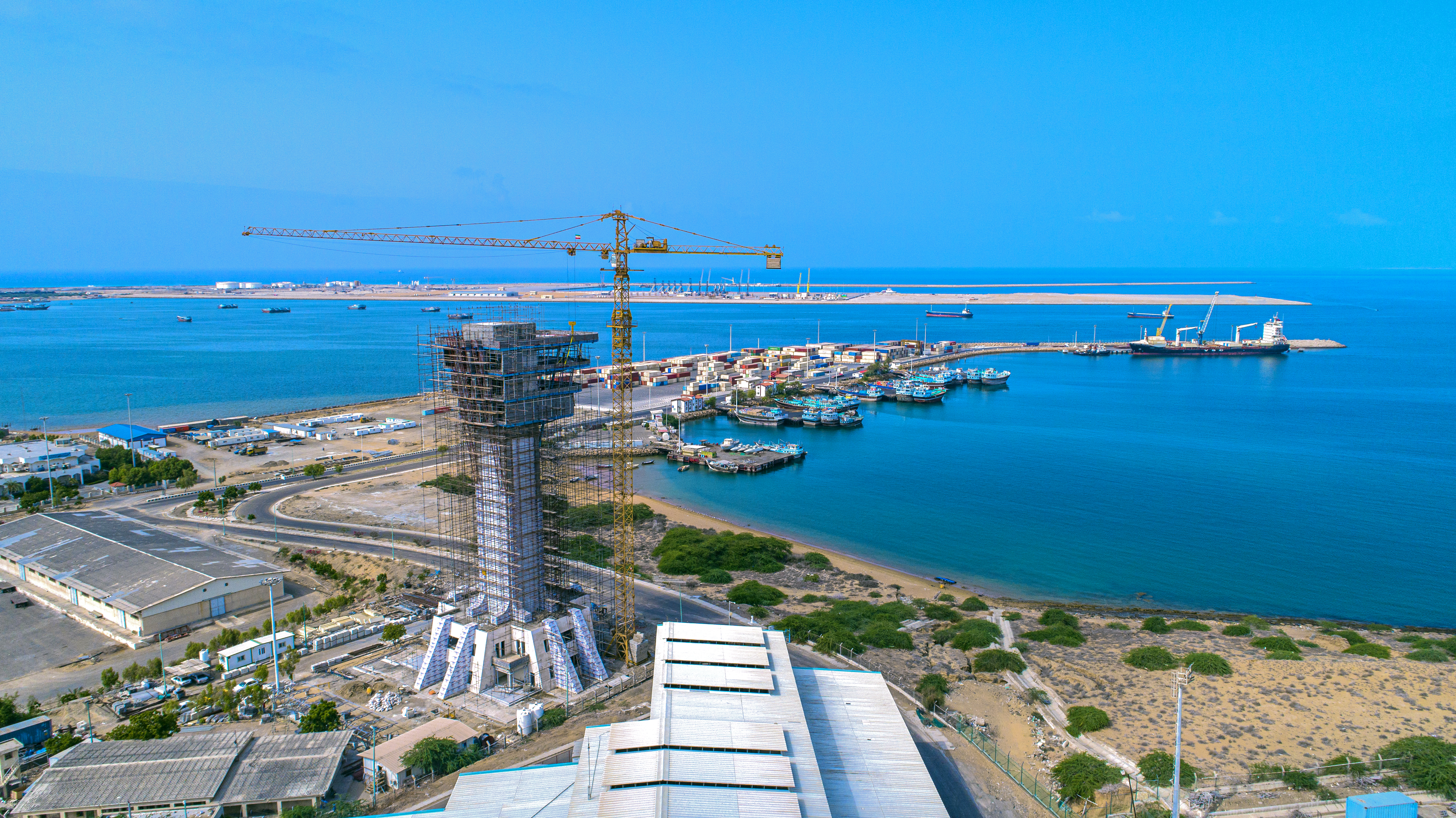
- Interactive map of Chabahar Port بندر چابهار

Location
- Country: Iran
- Location: Chabahar, Sistan and Baluchestan Province
- Coordinates: 25.300278°N 60.612778°E

Details
- Opened: 1983
- Operated by: India Ports Global Limited
- Owned by: Iran Ports and Maritime Organization
- Size of harbour: 480 ha (1,200 acres)
- Land area: 440 ha (1,100 acres)
- No. of berths: 10
- Employees: 1,000
- Director General: Behrouz Aghayi

Statistics
- Annual cargo tonnage: ▲2.1 million tons (2015)
- Website chabaharport.pmo.ir

Chabahar Port (Persian: چابهار)is a port city in southeastern Iran, located on the Gulf of Oman. The city has two multi-purpose commercial ports, Shahid Beheshti Port and Shahid Kalantari Port, on its coast. The port is only about 170 km west of Pakistani port of Gwadar.

Construction of Shahid Kalantari Port began in 1983, amid the particular circumstances prevailing in the Persian Gulf during the Iran–Iraq War. The government emphasized the need for a port outside the Strait of Hormuz and the Persian Gulf. The project began in earnest in 1983, and the port effectively became operational in 1985 following the completion of four metal berths. Because of its location on the coast of the Gulf of Oman, far from the center of the conflict, the port played an important role in exports during the war.

In 2000, the Iranian government approved Shahid Kalantari Port as an authorized maritime border crossing for passenger entry and exit.

India and Iran first agreed to plans to further develop Shahid Beheshti port in 2003, but did not do so on account of sanctions against Iran. As of 2016, the port has ten berths. In May 2016, India and Iran signed a bilateral agreement in which India would refurbish one of the berths at Shahid Beheshti port, and reconstruct a 600 meter long container handling facility at the port. The port is partly intended to provide an alternative for trade between India and Afghanistan as it is 800 kilometers closer to the border of Afghanistan than Pakistan's Karachi port. The port handled 2.1 million tons of cargo in 2015, which was planned to be upgraded to handle 8.5 million tons by 2016, and to 86 million tons in the future.

In October 2017, India's first shipment of wheat to Afghanistan was sent through the Chabahar Port. In December 2018, India took over the port's operations. Following the re-imposition of sanctions against Iran, foreign companies became reluctant to participate in the port's expansion, and only 10% of the port's 8.5 million-ton total capacity was utilized in 2019. Sanctions also played a role in reducing India's involvement and investment in the US$1.6 billion Chabahar–Zahedan railway.

== Location ==
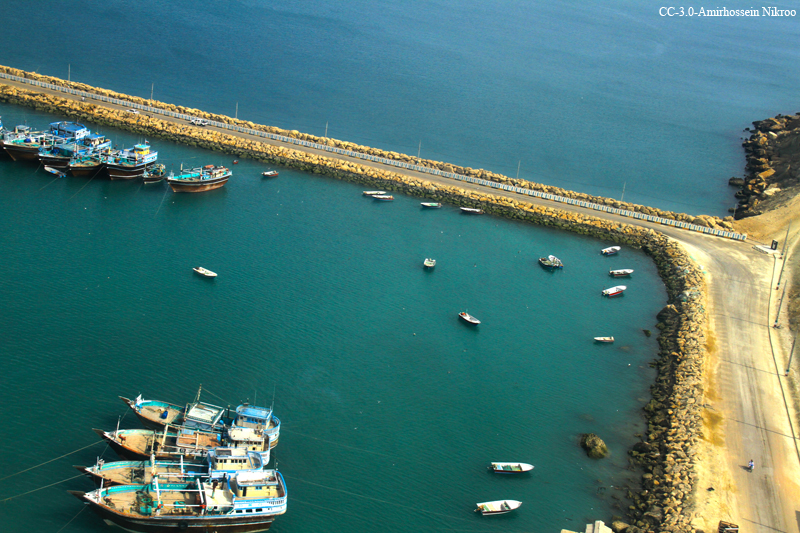
Boats anchored in Chabahar Bay.

The port of Chabahar is located on the Makran coast of Sistan and Baluchistan Province, next to the Gulf of Oman and at the mouth of the Strait of Hormuz. It is the only Iranian port with direct access to the Indian Ocean. Being close to Afghanistan and the Central Asian countries of Turkmenistan, Uzbekistan and others, it has been termed the "Golden Gate" to these landlocked countries.

Chabahar is 700 km (430 mi) away from Zahedan, the capital of the Sistan and Baluchistan province, 950 km (590 mi) away from Milak, the closest city to the Afghan border, and 1,827 km (1,135 mi) away from Sarakhs on the Turkmen border.

The marine distance to Dubai is 353 nautical miles (654 kilometres; 406 miles), to Karachi in Pakistan is 456 nmi (845 km; 525 mi), and to Mumbai in India is 843 nmi (1,560 km; 970 mi) . Pakistan's deep sea port at Gwadar is also on the Makran coast, at a distance of a mere 76 nautical miles. Gwadar also claims to provide access to Central Asia, and comparisons between the two ports are frequently made by analysts.

Because 90 percent of Iran's population is concentrated in the western part of the country, the eastern part is relatively less developed. Iran is intending to change that with the development around Chabahar port, with a free trade zone and road and rail links between Chabahar and Central Asia. Its plan is to use Chabahar port as the gateway to Central Asia and to maintain the Bandar Abbas port, which currently handles 85% of Iran's seaborne trade, as a hub for trade with Russia and Europe.

The highly congested Bandar Abbas port is not a deep water port and cannot handle the 250,000-ton oceangoing cargo ships. At present, such ships dock in the United Arab Emirates (UAE) and the cargo is transferred to smaller, 100,000-ton ships for onward shipment to Iran. This makes Iran dependent on the UAE for shipments and represents a loss of revenue. Unlike Bandar Abbas, Chabahar has the ability to handle standard cargo ships.

== History ==
A former port named Tis in Chabahar's neighborhood dates back to the Sasanian era, and was known to Ptolemy as "Tesa". Al-Biruni wrote that the sea coast of India commences with Tis. The Portuguese forces under Afonso de Albuquerque gained control of Chabahar and Tis, staying there until 1621. The British, and later the Portuguese in the 17th century entered this region.

The modern development of Chabahar began in the 1980s, with the construction of Shahid Kalantari Port. Construction work began in 1983, against the backdrop of the Iran–Iraq War and the security challenges affecting the Persian Gulf. During the war, the Iranian government recognized the strategic importance of having a major seaport outside the Persian Gulf and the Strait of Hormuz. Following the completion of four steel berths, the port was officially opened and became operational in 1985. Owing to its location along the Gulf of Oman, away from the main conflict zone, Shahid Kalantari Port played an important role in Iran's export activities during the war.

In 2000, the Iranian government officially designated Shahid Kalantari Port as an authorized maritime border crossing for the entry and departure of passengers.

The 1990s marked a significant turning point in Chabahar's development. In 1993, the government established the Chabahar Free Trade-Industrial Zone, with the aim of attracting investment, expanding commercial activities and promoting economic development in southeastern Iran. The establishment of the free zone also paved the way for the expansion of the city's maritime infrastructure and the development of Shahid Beheshti Port as a modern commercial seaport.

The Chabahar port actually contains two separate ports called Shahid Kalantari and Shahid Beheshti. Between 1982 and 1983, Iran constructed four 45 meters (150 feet) berths at Shahid Kalantari and four 150 meters (492 feet) berths at Shahid Beheshti. Two larger berths, 235 meters (771 feet) and 265 meters (869 feet) meters long, were constructed in 1997 and 2004 respectively.

In 2013, India approved a cabinet proposal to invest $115 million into the port.

In August 2017, Indian Union Minister of Ports, Nitin Gadkari, informed at an event in Iran that the civil work at Chabahar port developed by India is complete, and the Indian government is ordering INR 400 crores (US$63 million) worth of mechanised equipment and cranes, and the port will be operational in 2018 to export Indian wheat to Afghanistan. after meeting with Iranian President Hasan Rouhani, he said "now, we are building a railway line in Iran. From Chabhar, we can go to Afghanistan, Uzbekistan and Russia."

In August 2017, India Global Ports Limited (IGPL) had applied for the permission to run the Chabahar port in the interim, while Iran has already completed the construction of jetty and IGPL will build two new terminals, one for the containers and another for the multi-purpose ships. In October 2017, IGPL had already started constructing the terminals after placing order for the construction equipment.

On 29 October 2017, the first shipment through the port was sent from India en route to Afghanistan. To demonstrate the viability of the route, seven shipments of wheat as aid to Afghanistan were planned to be sent by India by the end of January 2018.

On 3 December 2017, the first phase of the port construction was inaugurated by Iranian President Hassan Rouhani.

In January 2018, Iran and India signed an agreement worth $2 billion for cooperation in the rail sector. A part of the agreement pertains to a memorandum of understanding worth $600 million for Iran to purchase locomotives and freight cars from India.

In November 2018, The United States has exempted the multinational Chabahar port project from its sanctions against Iran due to its economic importance to Afghanistan.

In February 2019, Afghanistan Launches New Export Route To India Through Chabahar Port. At the inauguration of the new export route, officials said 23 trucks carrying 57 tonnes of dried fruits, textiles, carpets and mineral products were dispatched from the southwestern Afghan city of Zaranj to Iran's Chabahar port. The consignment will be shipped to Mumbai.

On 14 July 2020, Iran proceeded with the construction of the Chabahar-Zahedan rail link independently, citing delays in the proposed funding from India. Iran issued a statement, clarifying that while the funding of the rail link by IRCON had come up in negotiations, it had not been agreed upon between India and Iran.

In late February 2024, the Taliban-led government of Afghanistan announced an investment of $35 million in the Chabahar port in southern Iran. According to The Diplomat, cooperation between Afghanistan and Iran can provide the Taliban regime with more policy options and reduce its dependence on Pakistan.

In 2026, India was reported to have exited the port citing the American tariffs, however, the Indian government denied such reports and added that they are in talks with the US for extension of the waiver. One government source added, "India has no choice but to exit the Chabahar port".

In April 2026, with the US sanctions waiver for Chabahar set to expire on 26 April, India entered negotiations with Iran to finalize an arrangement to safeguard its interests in the port. The government is seeking a mechanism under which a local Iranian ports authority would manage the port with legal guarantees that operational rights would revert to India once sanctions are lifted.

== India–Iran–Afghanistan partnership ==
During the 1990s Iran and India, along with Russia, collaborated in backing the Northern Alliance in Afghanistan against the Pakistan-backed Taliban. At this time, Iran invited India to develop the Chabahar port to obtain ready access to Afghanistan. In 1997, a trilateral agreement was signed with Turkmenistan to expand trade into Central Asia and, in 2000, another agreement with Russia to provide seamless transport between India and Europe via an International North-South Transport Corridor.

After the American presence in Afghanistan, India, Iran and Afghanistan got together in January 2003, agreeing on a joint development of transportation links to Afghanistan. India agreed to expand the Chabahar port and to lay a railway track between Chabahar and Zaranj. Iran has completed 70 percent of the first phase of the Chabahar project at a cost of $340 million. India has spent $134 million during 2005–2009 to construct a road from Delaram in Afghanistan to Zaranj at the Iran–Afghanistan border. Iran has also built a roadway between Milak, close to Zaranj, and Chabahar passing through Zahedan and Iranshahr. Through Milak, Zaranj and Deleram, connectivity has been established to the Afghan 'garland road', which connects the major Afghan cities Herat, Kandahar, Kabul and Mazar-e-Sharif. In March 2012, ships from India docked at Chabahar carrying 100,000 tonnes of wheat under humanitarian aid to Afghanistan. The Afghan businesses have begun to shift from the Karachi port to Chabahar port for transit.

India–Iran–Afghanistan transport corridor map

In 2016, India signed a deal with Iran entailing $8 billion investment in Chabahar port and industries in Chabahar Special Economic Zone, including an aluminium smelter and a urea making facility, at Chabahar port is being developed was a transit route to Afghanistan and central Asia. India has already built a 240-km road connecting Afghanistan with Iran. Also in planning is a rail route connecting Chabahar with the India-promoted $11-billion Hajigak iron and steel mining project in central Afghanistan, as seven Indian companies in 2011 acquired rights to mine central Afghanistan's Hajigak region, which contain Asia's largest deposit of iron ore. The Government of India has pledged to Afghanistan to spend $2bn in developing supporting infrastructure including Chabahar to Hajigaj railway. All this will bring cargo to Bandar Abbas port and Chabahar port, and free Kabul from its dependence on Pakistan to reach the outer world, giving India access to Afghanistan and beyond to Turkmenistan, Uzbekistan, Tajikistan, Kyrgyzstan, Kazakhstan, Russia and Europe via 7,200-km-long multi-modal North–South Transport Corridor (INSTC).

However, without further development of the Chabahar port, these road links would remain underutilized. Despite intentions, India's involvement in the infrastructure development within Iran has been minimal, possibly due to the Western pressure to apply sanctions. Iran is also believed to have a shown a preference for Iranian contractors instead of Indians. The initiative was restarted in August 2012 in a trilateral meeting on the sidelines of a Non-Aligned Summit.

=== 2016 trilateral Transit Agreement ===
"This is a very, very crucial agreement for Afghanistan. The opening of this corridor will help us to fully reach our potential, give us a new trade route. This is a completely new chapter".
— Shaida Abdali, Afghan ambassador to India, April 2016.

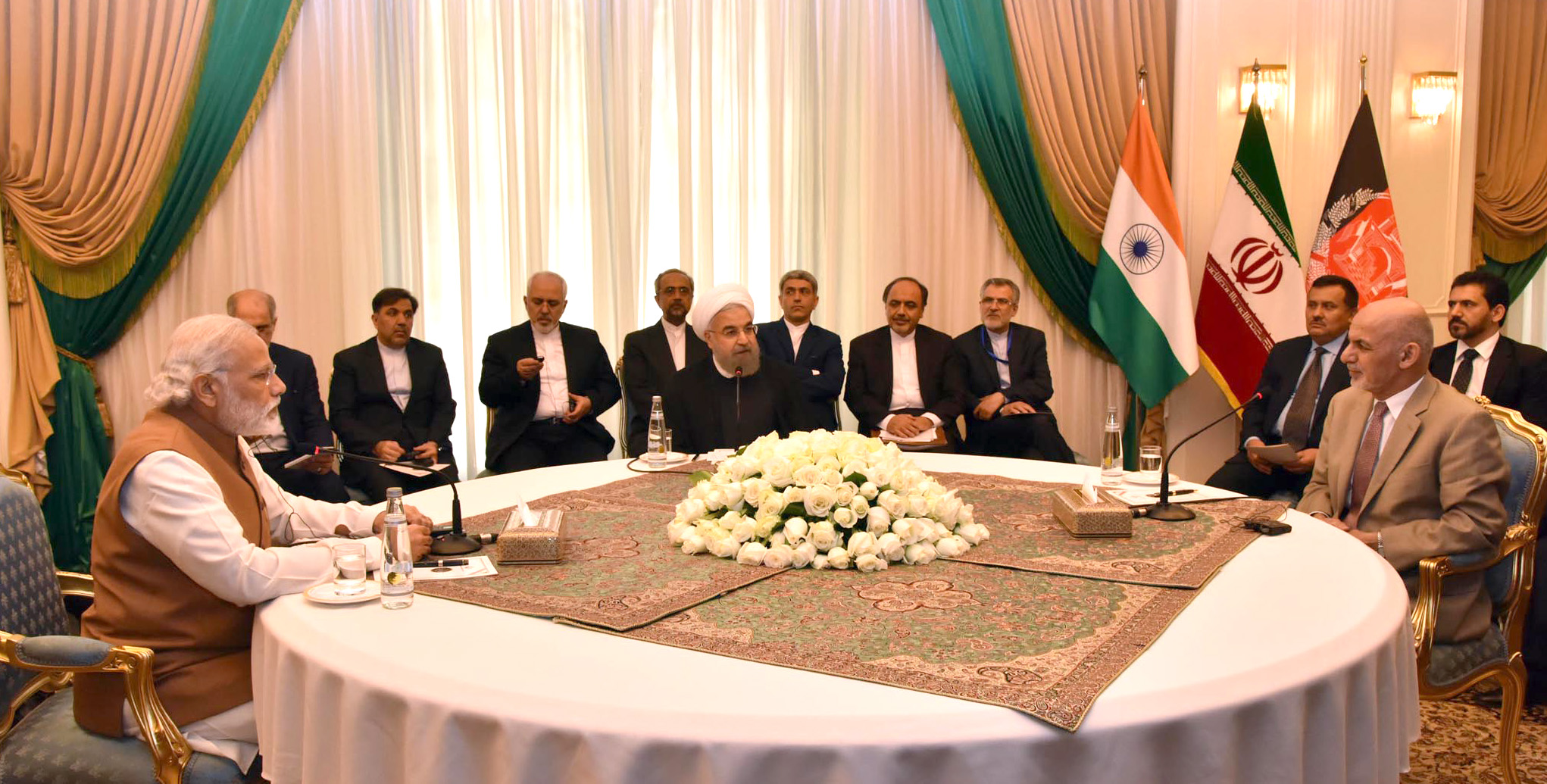
Afghan President Ashraf Ghani, Indian Prime Minister Narendra Modi, and Iranian President Hassan Rouhani at the signing of the trilateral transit agreement between the three countries in May 2016.

In May 2016, India signed a series of twelve memoranda of understanding, which centered upon the Port of Chabahar.

The trilateral transit agreement signed by India, Iran and Afghanistan allows Indian goods to reach Afghanistan through Iran. It links ports in the western coast of India to the Chabahar port and covers the road and rail links between Chabahar and the Afghan border.

The bilateral agreement between India and Iran gives India the right to develop two berths of the Chabahar port as agreed in 2015 and allows them to be operated for 10 years by India Ports Global, a joint venture between Jawaharlal Nehru Port Trust and Kandla Port Trust, in partnership with Iran's Aria Banader. India Ports Global has guaranteed handling of 30,000 TEUs by the third year of operations, and aims to eventually handle 250,000 TEUs.

The berths will be developed at a cost of $85 million over the course of 18 months. Under the agreement, India Ports Global will refurbish a 640 meters (2,100 feet) long container handling facility, and reconstruct a 600 meters (1,970 feet) long container handling facility at the port. India Ports Global will modernize ancillary infrastructure by installing four rail-mounted gantry cranes, sixteen rubber-tire gantry cranes, two reach stackers, two empty handlers, and six mobile harbor cranes. Upon completion of upgrade works agreed to in the May 2016 agreements, Chabahar's capacity will be increased to 8 million tons from the current 2.5 million ton capacity.

The investment is supplemented with a $150 million credit line to Iran through the Exim Bank of India. India has also offered to supply $400 million worth of steel towards the construction of a rail link between Chahbahar and Zahedan. Indian commitments to Iranian infrastructure could total $635 million as per the twelve memoranda of understanding signed in May 2016.

As per the deal, India will also be developing various industries, including aluminum and urea production plants, in the Chabahar economic zone attached to the port.

Iran's ambassador to Pakistan, Mehdi Honerdoost stated that Pakistan and China had both been invited to contribute to the project before India, but neither China nor Pakistan had expressed interest in joining.

On 29 October 2017, the trilateral transit trade and route was implemented when the first shipment of wheat was sent from India to Afghanistan via Chabahar.

=== Connectivity Plan ===
The India–Iran–Afghanistan three-way memorandum of understanding (MoU) plans have committed at least $21bn to Chabahar–Hajigak corridor, including $85m for Chabahar port development by India, $150m line of credit by India to Iran, $8bn India-Iran MoU for Indian industrial investment in Chabahar Special Economic Zone, $11-billion Hajigak iron and steel mining project awarded to seven Indian companies in central Afghanistan, and India's $2bn commitment to Afghanistan for developing supporting infrastructure including the Chabahar-Hajigaj railway, with potential for several times more trade via connectivity to 7,200-km-long multi-mode North–South Transport Corridor (INSTC) connecting to Europe and Turkey, R297 Amur highway and Trans-Siberian Highway across Russia, and planned Herat to Mazar-i-Sharif railway providing access to Turkmenistan, Uzbekistan, Tajikistan and Kyrgyzstan. Chabahar Port also provides direct access to India's Farkhor Air Base in Tajikistan. Chabahar route will result in 60% reduction in shipment costs and 50% reduction in shipment time from India to Central Asia.

== Transport infrastructure ==
=== Chabahar–Zahedan–Bam–Hajigak Railway ===
Existing Iran railway network in 2020; Zahedan–Bam railway was completed in 2009

India had initially proposed a plan to construct a 900 km Chabahar–Zahedan–Hajigak railway line that would connect Chabahar to the mineral-rich Hajigak region of Afghanistan. In 2011, seven Indian companies acquired rights to mine central Afghanistan's Hajigak region, which contain Asia's largest deposit of iron ore. The Government of India had pledged to spend $2bn in developing supporting infrastructure. In May 2016, a MoU was also signed for financing of the planned Chabahar–Zahedan railway section of Chabahar–Zahedan-Hajigak railway, as part of North–South Transport Corridor, by Indian Railways's public sector unit Ircon International.

India had offered to supply approximately $400 million worth of steel towards the construction of this railway, as well as offered to finance construction of the Chabahar to Zahedan rail line at a cost of $1.6 billion. India began shipping rail tracks worth US$150 million in July 2016, and in December 2016 Iran also allocated US$125 million toward this rail route.

However, on 14 July 2020, Iran announced that it would be proceeding with constructing the Chabahar-Zahedan railway independently, citing delays in the Indian funding as the reason for dropping the partnership. The Iranian government has projected completion of the rail link by March 2022, utilising the National Development Fund of Iran to complete the project.

Chabahar's connection to the country's railway plan is under study and consideration. A rail link between Chabahar and Zahedan, when completed, can connect Chabahar to the Kerman–Zahedan railway and further to the Trans-Iranian Railway.

=== Mashhad–Herat–Mazar-i-Sharif Railway ===
Mashhad in north east Iran to Herat in north west Afghanistan rail route has four sections, two each in Iran and Afghanistan. Within Iran, section-1 from Khaf to Sangan 16 km route was completed in September 2016 and section-2 from Sangan to Iran–Afghanistan border at Shamtiq (Shematigh, Shmtygh, شمتیغ) 62 km was completed in October 2017. Within Afghanistan, section-3 from the Iran–Afghanistan border at Shamtiq–Jono (Jonaw, Junaw) to Ghurian 61.2 km route was completed in October 2017 and finally section-4 from Jono to Herat is an Italy-supported 86 km route. Herat is already linked with Turkmenistan via rail and road routes. India and Afghanistan plan to extend rail route from Herat to Mazar-i-Sharif. Mazar-i-Sharif is already linked with Uzbekistan and Tajikistan via rail as well as via road routes with other central Asian nations.

=== Private sector investments ===
India's minister of Road Transport and Highways Nitin Gadkari also stated that Indian companies could potentially invest over ₹1 lakh crore (US$11 billion) in the Chabahar Special Economic zone. He however stated that potential investments would depend on whether Iran would be willing to supply Indian projects with natural gas at tariffs substantially lower than those offered by Iran.

In March 2017, India has invited expression of interest from private parties to manage the port for 10 years, Adani Group and Ruia family's Essar Group are interested, and India announced that port equipment such as crane etc. will be procured soon. In March 2017, India is already running training in Nagpur for the Afghan customs officials to be posted at Iran-Afghan border customs post built by India on the road built by India and Afghan ambassador to India announced that Indian shipments to Afghanistan via Chabahar will commence soon.

== Security ==
=== Defense cover ===
Chabahar Port benefits from the protection of the Armed Forces of the Islamic Republic of Iran military bases located in Konarak, Iran, across Chabahar Bay to the West.

=== Security issues ===
Chronic instability in Afghanistan may limit the usefulness of Chabahar as a conduit to Afghanistan and Central Asia. Road networks between Chabahar and Afghanistan rely upon connections to the Afghan Ring Road. In August 2016, insurgent activity by Afghanistan's Taliban insurgent group forced closure of the Ring Road between Kandahar and Helmand Province. After the Taliban took power in Afghanistan, IS-KP became a major security threat in the region.

Iran's Sistan and Baluchestan Province, in which Chabahar port is located, was also the stage for insurgent activity by the insurgent group Jundallah, which claims to be fighting for the rights of Sunni Muslims, and the local ethnic Baloch. In 2010, Jundallah fighters dispatched a suicide bomber to a Shi'ite mosque in Chabahar, killing 38 people. In the 2020s, its successor, Jaish ul-Adl, continues terror attacks in the Baloch insurgency.

== Misinformation ==
There have been several instances of misinformation campaigns aimed at undermining Iran's foreign engagements related to the Chabahar Port, including the dissemination of false claims regarding its agreements with partner states.

In July 2025, the Iranian Embassy in India flagged a misinformation campaign targeting the India–Iran Chabahar Port agreement, warning that fake social media accounts—some traced to Pakistan—were impersonating Iranian entities to falsely claim that Tehran was reconsidering the pact. The embassy released screenshots of these accounts, some bearing verified badges, and labeled them as deliberate attempts to undermine bilateral relations by spreading disinformation.

== Strategic implications ==
American policy analyst Rorry Daniels has characterized both the Indian investment in Chabahar and the Chinese investment in Gwadar as generating perceptions of "strategic encirclement". According to her, China fears encirclement by the US, India by China, and Pakistan by India. All of these encirclements are seen by the respective countries as "containment strategies", which they attempt to break out of. Indian news commenter Shishir Gupta described India's Chabahar Port deal as "a counter to the China-Pakistan Economic Corridor," as it has "broken through the strategic encirclement by China and Pakistan."

Scholar Neil Padukone however disagrees that India has a goal of encircling Pakistan. India needs access to iron from Afghanistan's Hajigak mine and other natural resources from the Central Asian countries of Kazakhstan, Turkmenistan, and Uzbekistan, which is made possible by the Chabahar port. But, in the long run, the pipeline-to-road-to-rail-to-sea-to-road shipment costs through Chabahar should be circumvented by direct transit through Pakistan. So far, Pakistan has been reluctant to provide such access. The US State Department does not currently see military cooperation between Iran and India as part of the Chabahar project, although it has cautioned India to remain within the legal parameters with respect to collaboration with Iran. The US also sees the Indian presence in greater Central Asia beneficial for spreading the soft power of democratic and friendly regimes. India hopes to see the Western countries use the Chabahar route to link to Afghanistan and reduce their dependence on Pakistan.

Padukone agrees that India has need for establishing a "naval counterweight" to China's presence in Gwadar, as India sees the Gwadar Port as a manifestation of a strong China–Pakistan alliance that seeks to choke Indian investments in the Indian Ocean region. Scholar Christophe Jaffrelot states that Gwadar gives the Chinese a key listening post to monitor US and Indian naval activity in the Persian Gulf as well as a dual-use civil-military base for Chinese ships and submarines. India perceives a direct threat and its response has been to help build the Chabahar port.

=== Relationship with CPEC ===
Iran has stated that Chabahar is not a rival to Pakistan's Gwadar and invited Pakistan to join in its development. Pakistani analysts have endorsed the view, stating that Gwadar has an advantage by being a deep sea port and the expansion of Chabahar would in fact expand trade through Gwadar. Larger vessels that cannot dock at Chabahar could dock at Gwadar and the cargo transshipped to Chabahar. Pakistan's foreign policy advisor Sartaj Aziz has signaled that Pakistan may link the Gwadar port to Chabahar.

However, in 2016, a retired Pakistani military officer characterized cooperation between India, Iran, and Afghanistan as a "security threat to Pakistan", that had "ominous and far-reaching implications" to the region. He also bemoaned the country's increasing "isolationism" and blamed what he called the “inaction” of the Foreign Office of Nawaz Sharif's government.

In light of trade restrictions imposed on Iran by USA, India had reduced oil imports from Iran, but USA has not intervened directly in the port's development. Jeff Smith, a South Asia expert at The Heritage Foundation in Washington, said in November 2017, "conservative analysts in [Washington] DC have accepted the fact that India will maintain some form of relationship with Iran, Iran is more about a transport corridor to Afghanistan; that it has no interest in advancing Iran's agenda in the Middle East; and that whatever space India evacuates there will be filled by China".

=== Iran's international strategy ===
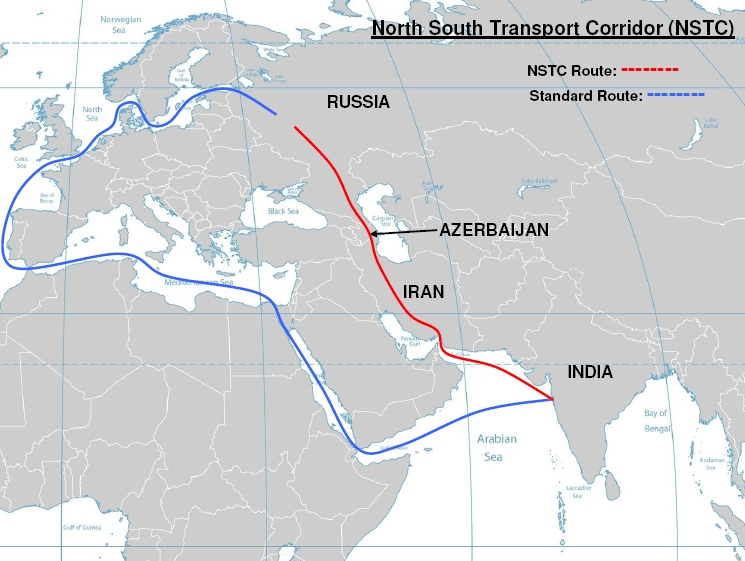
North-South Transport Corridor (NSTC).

Consistent with its desire to be seen as a significant regional player, Iran has taken the initiative to engage with all the neighbouring countries to enhance the transit potential of Chabahar. It has signed a memorandum of understanding (MoU) with Afghanistan and Tajikistan on the construction of railway lines, water pipelines and energy transmission lines. It has been keen to extend the Khvaf-Herat rail line to connect to the railways of Central Asia, Turkey, and Europe. It has entered into an agreement with Oman, Qatar, Turkmenistan and Uzbekistan to establish a transport corridor between these countries. It is also a key partner in the International North-South Transport Corridor (INSTC) along with Russia, Ukraine, Turkey, Oman, Syria, India and the Central Asian countries, which aims to connect South and Central Asian countries to Northern Europe via Iran and Russia. Specifically with respect to Chabahar, Iran has envisioned it as a key port in linking India with Afghanistan and Central Asian countries. Initiatives in this regard include a roadway from Chabahar to Milak on the Afghanistan border, Chabahar-Faraj-Bam railway, Chabahar-Zahedan-Mashhad rail link, which will be further extended to Herat and Mazar-e-Sharif in Afghanistan and Termez in Uzbekistan. Iran also plans to build the Iranrud, a Suez Canal like canal through Iran to connect the Caspian Sea with the Persian Gulf.

== See also ==
- Ashgabat Agreement
- Iranrud
- Turkmenistan–Afghanistan–Pakistan–India Pipeline
- Rail transport in Iran
- North-South Transport Corridor
- Lapis Lazuli corridor

== General bibliography ==
- Chabahar Port (PDF), Port and Maritime Directorate General of Sistan and Balochistan province, 2013, archived from the original (PDF) on 2017-05-17
- Behuria, Ashok K.; Rizvi, M. Mahtab Alam (13 May 2015), India's Renewed Interest in Chabahar: Need to Stay the Course, New Delhi: IDSA Issue Brief, Institute for Defence Studies and Analyses
- Bhatnagar, Aryaman; John, Divya (October 2013), Accessing Afghanistan and Central Asia: Importance of Chabahar to India (PDF), Observer Research Foundation
- Cooper, Andrew Scott (2011), The Oil Kings: How the U.S., Iran, and Saudi Arabia Changed the Balance of Power in the Middle East, Simon and Schuster, ISBN 978-1-4391-5517-2
- Goud, R. Sidda; Mookherjee, Manisha, eds. (2014), India and Iran in Contemporary Relations, Allied Publishers, ISBN 978-81-8424-909-5
  - Cheema, Sujata Ashwarya (2014), "India-Iran Relations in the Post-Cold War: A Neo-Realist Analysis", in Goud, R. Sidda; Mookherjee, Manisha (eds.), India and Iran in Contemporary Relations, Allied Publishers, pp. 13–36, ISBN 978-81-8424-909-5
  - George, Anns (2014), "Chabahar Port and India's New Strategic Outpost in Middle East", in Goud, R. Sidda; Mookherjee, Manisha (eds.), India and Iran in Contemporary Relations, Allied Publishers, pp. 87–, ISBN 978-81-8424-909-5
- Padukone, Neil (2014), Beyond South Asia: India's Strategic Evolution and the Reintegration of the Subcontinent, Bloomsbury Publishing, ISBN 978-1-62892-255-4
- Roy, Meena Singh (2012), "Iran: India's Gateway to Central Asia", Strategic Analysis, 36 (6): 957–975, doi:10.1080/09700161.2012.728862
