= Begampura Express =

Train in India

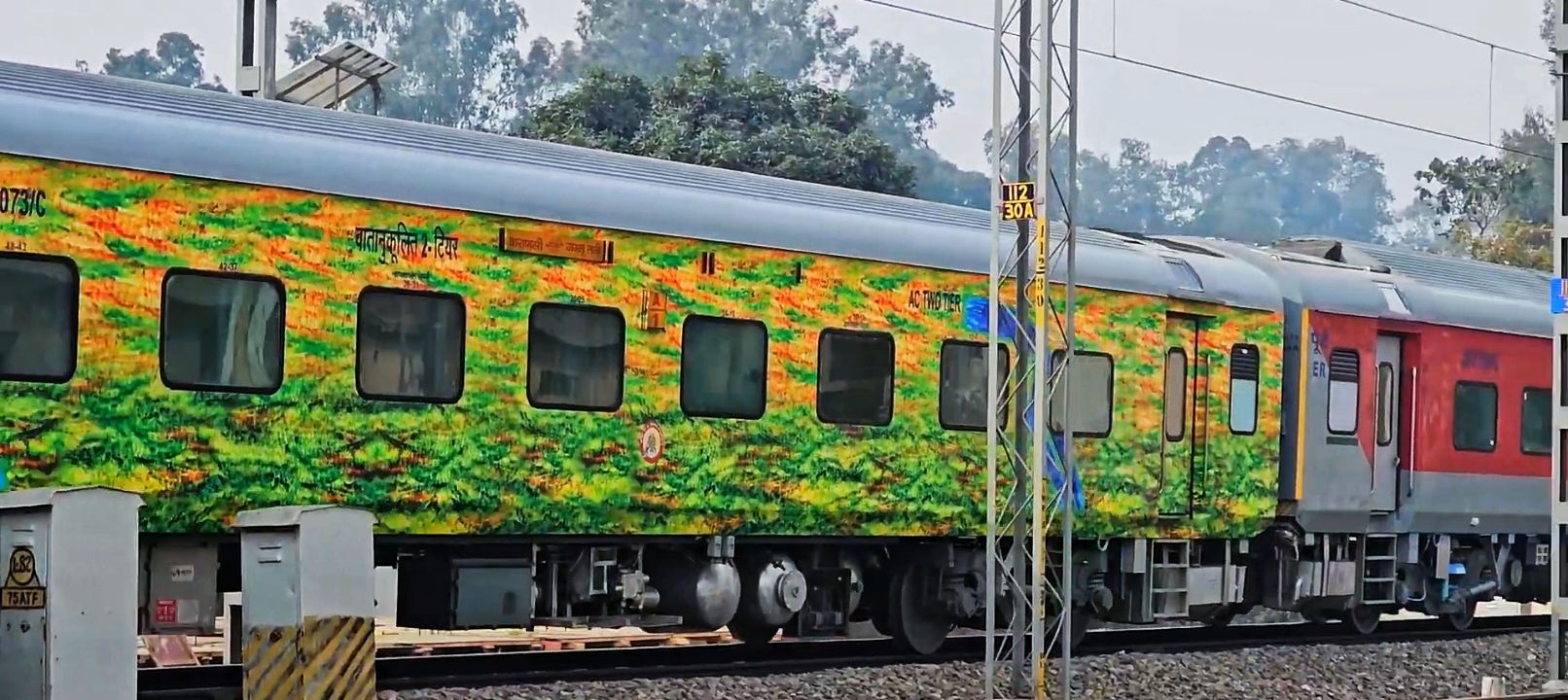
- Begampura Express At Ludhiana Junction railway station

Overview
- Service type: Superfast
- First service: 7 February 2010; 16 years ago
- Current operator: Northern Railway

Route
- Termini: Varanasi Junction (BSB); Jammu Tawi (JAT)
- Stops: 16
- Distance travelled: 1,260 km (783 mi)
- Average journey time: 22 hours 10 minutes
- Service frequency: Daily (Note: Runs seven days in a week for every direction.)
- Train number: 12237 / 12238

On-board services
- Classes: AC First Class, AC 2 Tier, AC 3 Tier, Sleeper Class, General Unreserved
- Seating arrangements: Yes
- Sleeping arrangements: Yes
- Catering facilities: On-board catering, E-catering
- Observation facilities: Large windows
- Baggage facilities: No
- Other facilities: Below the seats

Technical
- Rolling stock: LHB coach
- Track gauge: 1,676 mm (5 ft 6 in)
- Operating speed: 57 km/h (35 mph) average including halts.

The 12237 / 12238 Begampura Express is a superfast express train of the Indian Railways connecting Varanasi Junction in Uttar Pradesh and Jammu Tawi in Jammu and Kashmir. It is currently being operated with 12237/12238 train numbers on daily in week. The express train route was inaugurated in the year 2000.

== Service ==
It averages 56 km/h as 12237 Begampura Express and covers 1260 km in 22 hrs 35 mins and 56 km/h as 12238 Begampura Express and covers 1260 km in 22 hrs 30 mins.

12237 – leaves Varanasi Junction at 12:40 Hrs and reaches Jammu Tawi on 2 day at 11:05 hrs

12238 – leaves Jammu Tawi at 14:00 hrs and reaches Varanasi Junction at 12:30 hrs on 2 Day

The important halts of the train are :

- Varanasi Junction
- Jaunpur City
- Lambhua
- Sultanpur Junction
- Maharaja Bijli Pasi
- Lucknow Charbagh
- Shahjahanpur
- Moradabad Junction
- Saharanpur Junction
- Ambala Cantonment Junction
- Ludhiana Junction
- Jalandhar Cantonment Junction
- Pathankot Cantonment
- Kathua
- Jammu Tawi

== Route and halts ==
- Varanasi Junction
- Jaunpur City
- Lambhua
- Sultanpur
- Maharaja Bijli Pasi
- Lucknow Charbagh
- Shahjahanpur
- Moradabad
- Saharanpur
- Ambala Cantonment
- Ludhiana
- Jalandhar Cantonment
- Mukerian
- Pathankot Cantonment
- Kathua
- Jammu Tawi

== Traction ==
Both trains are hauled by a Ghaziabad Loco Shed or Tughlakabad Loco Shed-based WAP-7 electric locomotive from end to end.

== Coach composition ==
The train has standard LHB rakes with max speed of 130 kmph. The train consists of 22 coaches:

- 1 AC first-class
- 2 AC II tier
- 6 AC III tier
- 6 Sleeper coaches
- 5 General
- 1 Slrd
- 1 EoG

== See also ==
- Himgiri Superfast Express
- Archana Express
- Kolkata–Jammu Tawi Express
