= Harihar Express =

Train in India

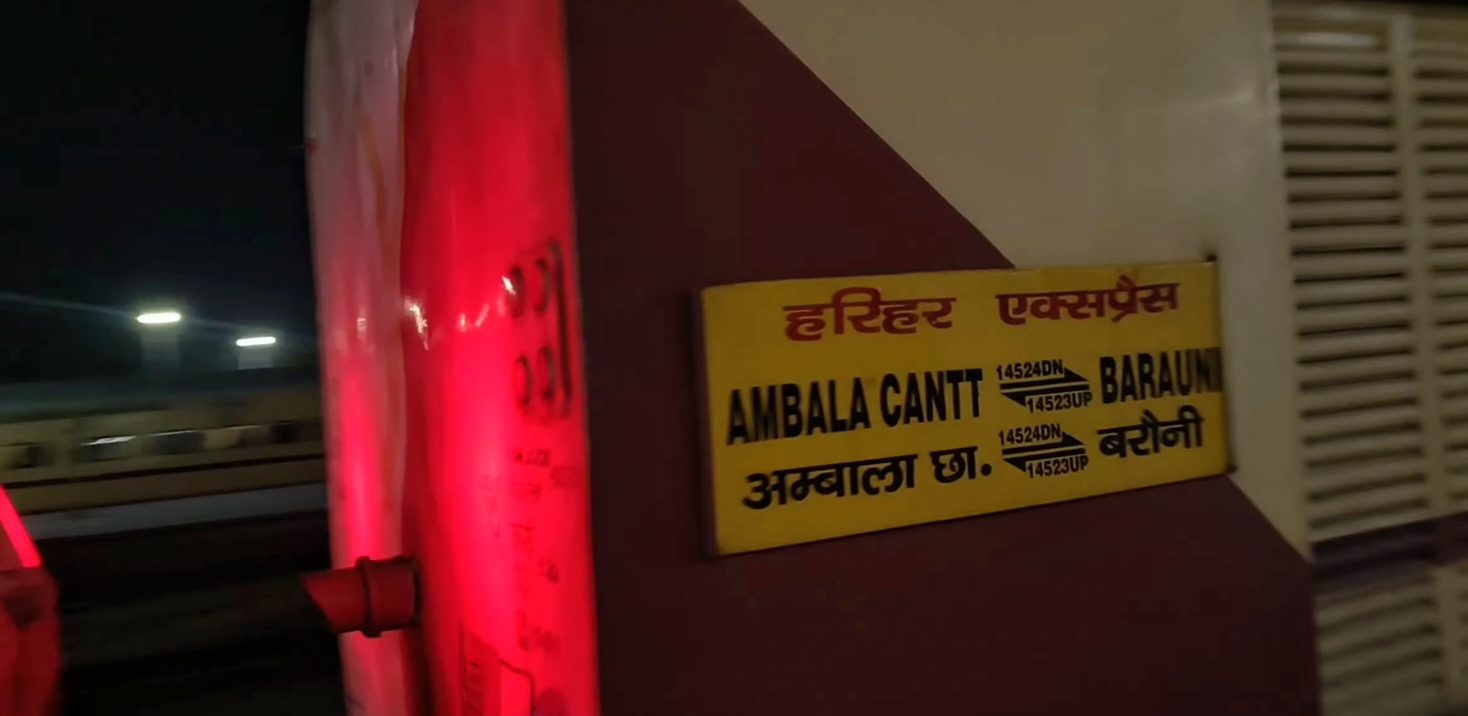
- Harihar Express At Sonpur Junction

Overview
- Service type: Express
- Locale: Haryana, Uttarakhand, Uttar Pradesh & Bihar
- Current operator: Northern Railway

Route
- Termini: Barauni Junction (BJU); Ambala Cantt. (UMB)
- Stops: 20
- Distance travelled: 1,305 km (811 mi)
- Average journey time: 27 hours 50 minutes
- Service frequency: Bi-weekly (Note: Runs two days in a week for every direction.)
- Train number: 14523 / 14524

On-board services
- Classes: AC 3 tier, Sleeper class, General Unreserved
- Seating arrangements: No
- Sleeping arrangements: Yes
- Catering facilities: On-board catering, E-catering
- Observation facilities: Large windows
- Baggage facilities: No
- Other facilities: Below the seats

Technical
- Rolling stock: ICF coach
- Track gauge: 1,676 mm (5 ft 6 in)
- Operating speed: 47 km/h (29 mph) average including halts.

The 14523 / 14524 Harihar Express is an Express train belonging to Northern Railway zone that runs between Barauni Junction and Ambala Cantonment Junction in India. It is currently being operated with 14523/14524 train numbers on Bi-weekly basis.

== History ==
The Harihar Express, at the time of its inauguration, ran between Ambala and Sonpur via Panipat and Delhi. Later, it operated between Ambala and Muzaffarpur via Saharanpur. Eventually, it was extended to run between Ambala and Barauni via Saharanpur.

== Service ==
The 14523/Harihar Express has an average speed of 48 km/h and covers 1305 km in 26h 55m. The 14524/Harihar Express has an average speed of 48 km/h and covers 1305 km in 26h 55m.

== Route and halts ==
The important halts of the train are:

- Barauni Junction
- Samastipur Junction
- Muzaffarpur Junction
- Hajipur Junction
- Chhapra Junction
- Ballia
- Ghazipur City
- Varanasi Junction
- Sultanpur Junction
- Nihalgarh
- Lucknow Charbagh
- Bareilly Junction
- Moradabad Junction
- Najibabad Junction
- Laksar Junction
- Roorkee
- Saharanpur Junction
- Yamunanagar-Jagadhri
- Ambala Cantonment Junction

== Coach composition ==
The train has standard ICF rakes with max speed of 110 kmph. The train consists of 18 coaches:

- 1 AC III Tier
- 9 Sleeper coaches
- 6 General
- 2 Seating cum Luggage Rake

== Traction ==
Both trains are hauled by a Ghaziabad Loco Shed-based WAP-5 electric locomotive from Barauni Junction to Ambala Cantonment and vice versa.

== See also ==
- Barauni Junction railway station
- Ambala Cantonment Junction railway station
- Himgiri Superfast Express
- Shaheed Express
