= Himgiri Superfast Express =

Train in India

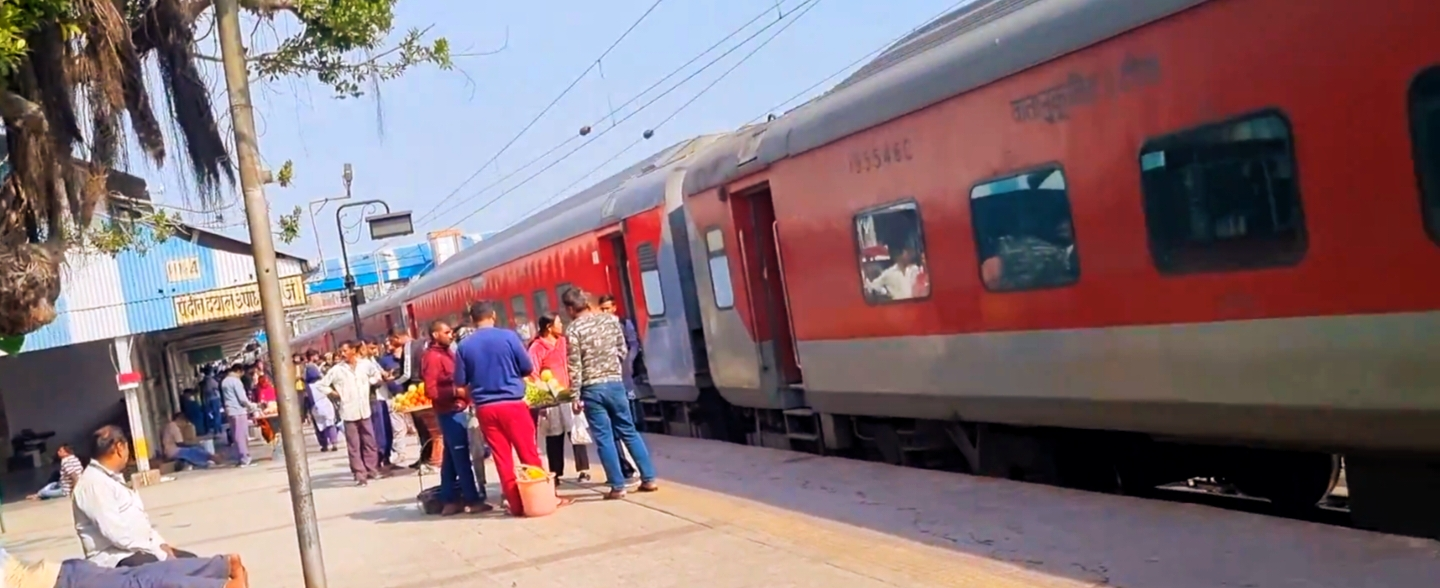
- Himgiri Superfast Express At Pt.DDU Junction

Overview
- Service type: Superfast
- First service: 1 January 1979; 47 years ago
- Current operator: Eastern Railways

Route
- Termini: Howrah (HWH); Jammu Tawi (JAT)
- Stops: 30
- Distance travelled: 2,023 km (1,257 mi)
- Average journey time: 36 hrs 45 mins
- Service frequency: Tri-weekly
- Train number: 13041 / 13042

On-board services
- Classes: AC 1 Tier, AC 2 Tier, AC 3 Tier, Sleeper class, General Unreserved
- Seating arrangements: Yes
- Sleeping arrangements: Yes
- Catering facilities: Available
- Observation facilities: Large windows
- Baggage facilities: No
- Other facilities: Below the seats

Technical
- Rolling stock: LHB coach
- Track gauge: 1,676 mm (5 ft 6 in)
- Operating speed: 55.04 kilometres per hour (34.20 mph) average with halts

The 13041 / 13042 Himgiri Superfast Express is a Superfast train of the Indian Railways connecting Howrah Junction in West Bengal and Jammu Tawi in Jammu and Kashmir. It is currently being operated with 13041/13042 train numbers on three days in week. It covers a total distance of 2,024 km (1,258 mi) that runs through the major north states of India. The old ICF coach of the trains were replaced with the new LHB coach during Mid 14 August 2018.

== History ==
In 1975 in order to bring equality amongst all classes and provide good train experience to all strata of society, the Himgiri Express was launched. The Himgiri Express made its inaugural run on 1 January 1979. From 1984 to 2004, Himgiri Express followed a fast time table. Departing from Howrah Junction at 23.45 hrs & arriving Jammu Tawi at 07.45 hrs on 3rd day & on return departing Jammu Tawi at 22.45 hrs, arriving Howrah at 06.45 hrs on 3rd morning. In 1st 25 years of service this train used to stop only at Asansol Junction, Jasidih Junction, Jamui, Kiul Junction, Patna Junction, Varanasi Junction, Lucknow Charbagh, Bareilly Junction, Moradabad Junction, Saharanpur Junction, Ambala Cantonment, Ludhiana Junction, Jalandhar Cantonment & Pathankot Cantonment. However, 19 more stoppages were added between 2004 and 2020 period. This hampered operation & punctuality failed miserably. It was also when this express was launched that the Indian Railways abolished the third class in trains. In the early eighties the train used to leave Howrah Junction at 5.45 a.m. and maintained a strict punctuality. At that time the train was hauled by WDM 2A ALCO. The train nowadays has lost its glory.

== Services ==
Currently the train takes 36 hrs 45 mins to cover the journey. Departing at 23.55 hrs from Howrah Junction & arriving Jammu Tawi at 12.40 hrs on 3rd day as 13041 Himgiri Express. On return, departing 22.45 hrs from Jammu Tawi & arriving Howrah Junction at 11.30 hrs on 3rd day as 13042 Himgiri Express. Train had been slowed by 4 hrs 45 mins from 2004 onwards after 19 more halts were added. As the average speed of the train is at par with speed of 55 kilometres per hour (34 mph), as per Indian Railways rules, its fare includes a Superfast surcharge.

== Route & halts ==
The important halts of the train are;

- Howrah
- Asansol Junction
- ChittaranjanChittaranjan
- Madhupur Junction
- Jasidih Junction
- Jhajha
- Jamui
- Kiul Junction
- Mokama Junction
- Bakhtiyarpur Junction
- Patna Saheb
- Patna Junction
- Danapur
- Ara Junction
- Buxar
- Pt. Deen Dayal Upadhyaya Junction
- Varanasi Junction
- Jaunpur City
- Sultanpur Junction
- Maharaja Bijli pasi
- Lucknow Charbagh
- Bareilly Junction
- Moradabad
- Saharanpur Junction
- Yamunanagarjagadhri
- Ambala Cantonment Junction
- Ludhiana Junction
- Phagwara
- Jalandhar Cantonment
- Pathankot Cantonment
- Kathua
- Jammu Tawi

== Traction ==
Both trains are hauled by a Howrah Loco Shed-based WAP-5 / WAP-7 electric locomotive from end to end

== Coach composition ==
The train consists of 22 coaches:

- 1 composite (first class AC+2tier AC)
- 1 AC 2 Tier
- 4 AC three tier
- 1 buffet car
- 10 sleeper coach
- 3 unreserved coach
- 2 EOG

== Coach positioning ==
This positioning is for 13041 Himgiri express at Howarh Junction.

LOCO-EOG-GN-GN-GN-GN-S1-S2-S3-S4-S5-S6-S7-PC-HA1-A1-M1-B1-B2-B3-B4-B5–SLR

Vice versa for 13042 Himgiri express.

== See also ==
- Archana Express
- Begampura Express
- Kolkata–Jammu Tawi Express
