= Faridpur, Uttar Pradesh =

Faridpur Pitambarpur Pitambarpur
- Town
- Location in Uttar Pradesh, India Faridpur (India)
- Coordinates: 28°12′31″N 79°32′17″E
- Country: India
- State: Uttar Pradesh
- District: Bareilly

Government
  - Body: Nagar Palika
- Elevation: 215 m (705 ft)

Population (2011)
  - Total: 69,700

Languages
  - Official: Hindi
- Time zone: UTC+5:30 (IST)
- PIN: 243503
- Telephone code: 05821
- Vehicle registration: UP25
- Website: up.gov.in

Faridpur is a town and a small Nagar Palika and tehsil in Bareilly district in the Indian state of Uttar Pradesh. Faridpur is known for zari work. It comes under 122 Legislative assembly. Current M.L.A. is Professor Shyam Bihari Lal and M.P. is Neeraj Maurya. Nagarpalika Chairman of Faridpur is Sharaf Zari Wale.

== History ==
Faridpur was originally called Pura and is traditionally said to have been founded by a branch of the Katehria Rajputs who had been driven out from Bareilly sometime between 1657 and 1679. The name was changed to Faridpur by Sheikh Farid, governor of Bareilly in the period immediately before the Rohillas came to power. It was originally part of the pargana of Karor, but that pargana was split in two during the 1700s, with the southern part becoming the pargana of Tisua while the remaining northern part, originally called tappa Khalilpur, became known as the pargana of Faridpur. Sometime in the early 1800s, Faridpur was made the seat of a new tehsil, and in c. 1825 it absorbed Tisua into its jurisdiction.

In the age of British rule '''Lala Ram Kumar Agarwal''' was the Jameendar, Collector and Honorary Magistrate of this town. After this his son '''Lala Laxmi Narayan Agarwal''' became the last Collector and Honorary Magistrate of this town.

Around the turn of the 20th century, Faridpur was described as a long, narrow town, with a "neat, well-kept appearance". It consisted of two distinct parts, Bharatpur and Sarai Qasba, which were counted as separate mauzas for administrative purposes. Markets were held three times a week, generating a large amount of commercial activity. The tehsil office and police station had been state-of-the-art at the time of their construction, but by the early 1900s they had fallen into disrepair. Together with the registration office, they were located around a shady courtyard that was surrounded by a ditch. There was also a new dispensary, a post office, a cattle-pound, two sarais, a middle vernacular school, a girls' school, and two small aided schools, one of which was located in the town's main mosque. There were also several Hindu temples, one of which held a small fair in honor of Devi once a month, while larger gatherings happened annually on Dusahra. There was also a large Muslim gathering called the Basi fair on the 8th of Jumada al-awwal.

== Transport ==
Pitambarpur is the railway station of Faridpur.

The town is located at NH 24 Delhi-Lucknow highway so one can also reach here by bus or auto rickshaw.

== Demographics ==
As of 2011 India census, Faridpur had a population of 69,700. Males constitute 52% of the population and females 48%. Faridpur has an average literacy rate of 66%, lower than the national average of 74%: male literacy is 67%, while female literacy is 64%. In Faridpur, 15% of the population is under 6.

== Education ==
Faridpur has many educational institutions, including:

- Baba Farid College of Management and Technology Faridpur
- C.A.S. Inter College(FOUNDED BY Lala Changaamal ji in 1922)(the college of toppers, every year percentage of high school & intermediate is about 89 to 97)
- Saraswati Vidya Mandir Inter College
- Saraswati Shishu Mandir (one of the oldest in town for primary education)
- Lala Kishore Chand Kanya Inter College
- Kisan Inter College
- S.S.K.V. Inter College
- Manas Sthali Boarding School
- Krishna Public School
- Champa Devi Adarsh Vidya Niketan
- Vidya Wati Ram Charan Public Vidya Mandir
- Ram Kumar Mishra Memorial Inter College
- Changaamal Montessori School (Branch of C.A.S inter college)
- St. Paul School Faridpur
- Dr. Rajeev Modern Public School s.d.m colony
