= Jalandhar–Shri Mata Vaishno Devi Katra railway line =

Railway line in India

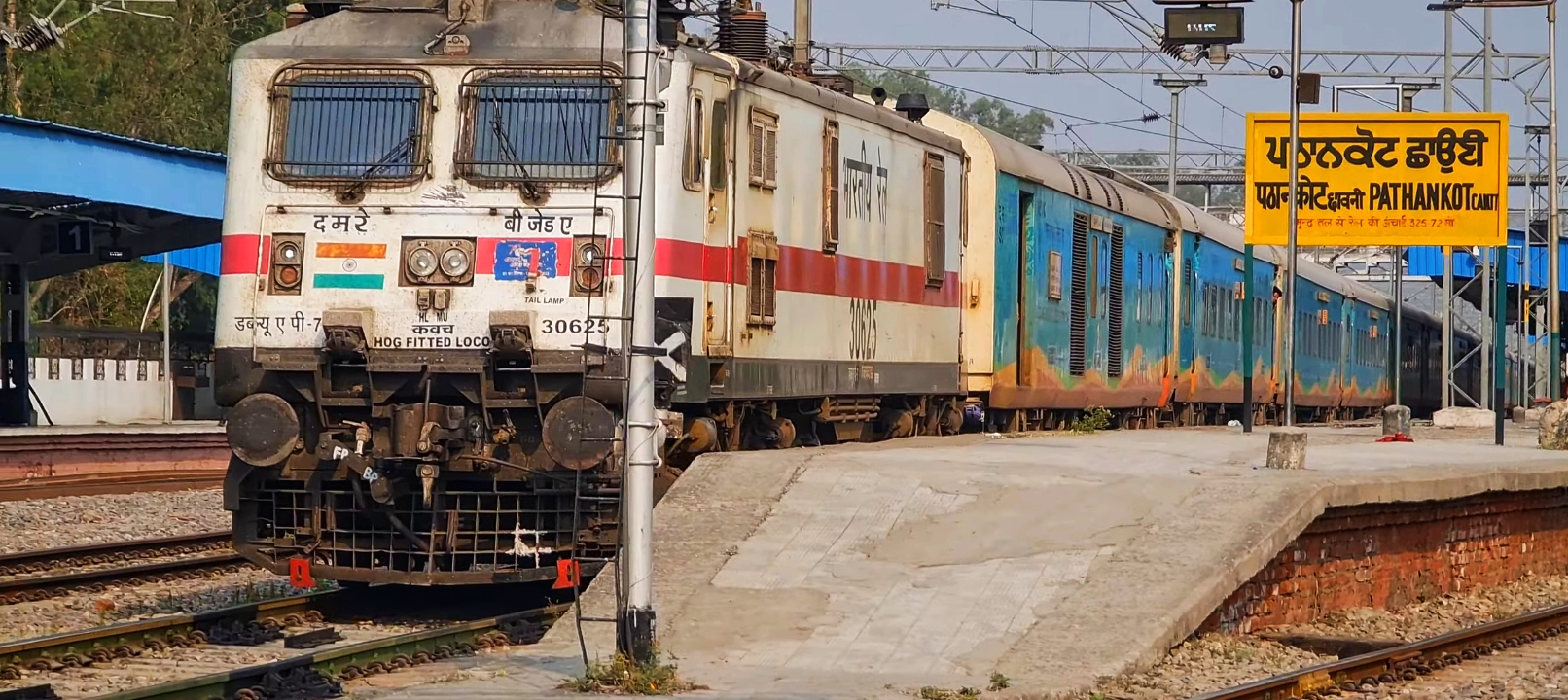
- Pathankot Cantt is an important railway station on Jalandhar–Shri Mata Vaishno Devi Katra railway line

Overview
- Native name: जालंधर–श्री माता वैष्णो देवी कटरा रेल लाइन
- Status: Operational
- Owner: Indian Railways
- Locale: Punjab, Jammu and Kashmir
- Termini: Jalandhar City; Shri Mata Vaishno Devi Katra railway station

Service
- Operator: Northern Railway

History
- Opened: 1971

Technical
- Line length: 289 KM
- Number of tracks: 2
- Track gauge: 5 ft 6 in (1,676 mm) broad gauge
- Electrification: completed
- Operating speed: up to 110 km/h
- Highest elevation: Jalandhar Cantonment 256 m (840 ft), Pathankot Cantonment352 m (1,155 ft), Jammu Tawi 414 m (1,358 ft)

The Jalandhar–Shri Mata Vaishno Devi Katra railway line is a railway route connecting Jalandhar in Punjab with Shri Mata Vaishno Devi Katra railway station in Jammu and Kashmir. The route passes through Pathankot and Jammu Tawi and provides a rail connection between Punjab and the Katra pilgrimage destination. It is operated by the Northern Railway.

== History ==
The line from Jalandhar City to Mukerian City was constructed in 1915. The Mukerian city to Pathankot jn line was built in 1952. The construction of the Pathankot–Jammu Tawi line was initiated in 1965, after the Indo-Pakistani War of 1965, and opened in 1971. Railway tracks between Jalandhar and Jammu Tawi have been doubled. Electrification of railway track between Jalandhar and Jammu Tawi was completed in 2014.

== History ==
Before the Partition of India in 1947, railway services to Jammu were connected through the Sialkot–Jammu railway line, which became disconnected from the rest of India after Partition.

Following Partition, a new rail connection towards Jammu was developed from the Jalandhar side. The Jalandhar City–Mukerian section had been constructed in 1915, while the Mukerian–Pathankot section was completed in 1952. Construction of the Pathankot–Jammu Tawi section began after the 1965 Indo-Pakistani War and the line was opened in 1971.

The railway connection was later extended beyond Jammu towards Udhampur and Katra as part of the Udhampur–Srinagar–Baramulla Rail Link (USBRL) project. The Jammu–Udhampur section was completed in 2005. The Udhampur–Shri Mata Vaishno Devi Katra section, 25.6 km long, was completed and dedicated to the nation on 4 July 2014. The first train was flagged off from Shri Mata Vaishno Devi Katra railway station on the same day.

== Speed limit ==
The Jammu–Jalandhar Cantonment line is classified as a "Group C" line and can take speeds up to 110 km/h.

== Passenger movement ==
Jalandhar City and Jammu Tawi, on this line, are amongst the top hundred booking stations of Indian Railway.

== DMU shed ==
India's first and largest DMU shed at Jalandhar holds 90 units placed in service in rural Punjab. It also houses two BEML-built rail buses which operate on the Beas–Goindwal Sahib line.

== Loco sheds ==
Jammu has a trip shed for visiting locos where WDS-4 locos belonging to Shakurbasti shed are retained for long periods. Pathankot Cantonment (Chakki Bank) had a steam shed which has now been decommissioned. Jalandhar City and Ludhiana have Electric Loco Sheds.

== Bridges ==
There are many major and minor bridges in the Jalandhar City–Jammu Tawi line. The most important bridges are the 1.38 km (0.9 mi)-long Beas River Bridge at Mirthal near Mukerian, the 0.225 km (0.1 mi)-long Chakki River Bridge at Pathankot, the 2.16 km (1.3 mi)-long Ravi River Bridge at Lakhanpur, Madhopur, the 1.23 km (0.8 mi)-long Bridge on Degh Nalah at Ghagwal, the 1.09 km (0.7 mi)-long Bridge on Basantar River at Samba and the 1.00 km (0.6 mi)-long bridge on River Unjh at Vijaypur Jammu.

== Railway reorganisation ==
Sind Railway (later reorganised as Scinde, Punjab & Delhi Railway) was formed a guaranteed railway in 1856. It constructed broad-gauge railways from Delhi to Multan via Lahore, and from Karachi to Kotri. Multan and Kotri were connected by ferry service on the Indus River. In 1871–72, Indus Valley Railway was formed to connect Multan and Kotri. At the same time, Punjab Northern State Railway started constructing from Lahore towards Peshawar. In 1886, Sind, Punjab and Delhi Railway was acquired by the state and amalgamated with Indus Valley Railway and Punjab Northern State Railway to form North-Western State Railway.

With the partition of India in 1947, North Western Railway was split. While the western portion became Pakistan West Railway, and later Pakistan Railways, the eastern part became Eastern Punjab Railway. In 1952, Northern Railway was formed with a portion of East Indian Railway Company west of Mughalsarai, Jodhpur Railway, Bikaner Railway and Eastern Punjab Railway.

== See also ==
- Railways in Jammu Kashmir and Ladakh
