= Chabahar Free Trade-Industrial Zone =

Free trade zone in Iran

Coordinates: 25.323°N 60.629°E

Chabahar Free Zone
- Type: Free Economic Zone
- Headquarters: Chabahar, Sistan and Baluchestan Province, Iran
- Website: http://www.cfzo.ir/

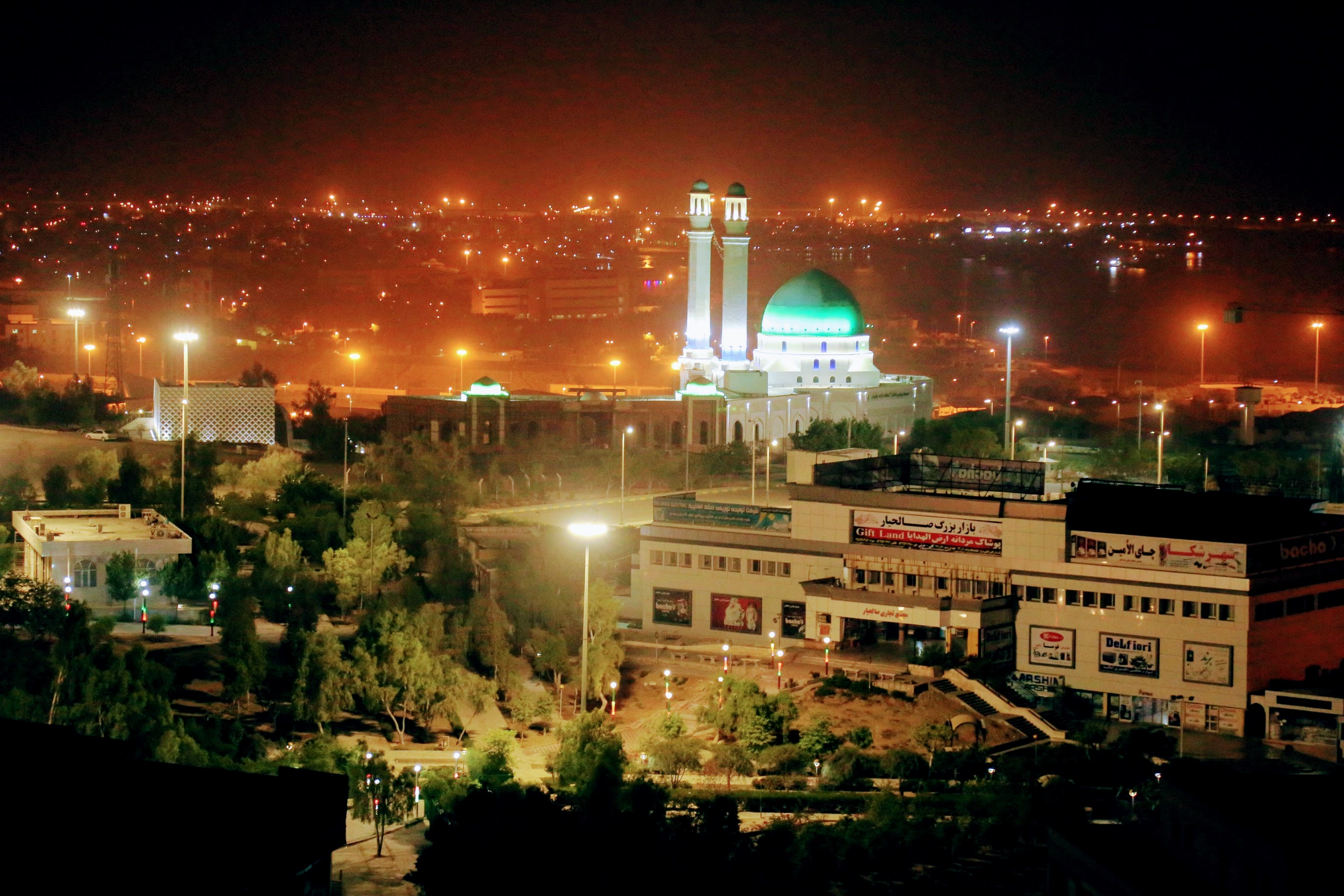
The sign of Chabahar Free Zone, Iran

Chabahar Free Trade–Industrial Zone (CFZ) (Persian: منطقه آزاد تجاری-صنعتی چابهار) is an Iranian free trade zone formed according to the law on the establishment and administration of free trade–industrial zones.

Chabahar free trade–industrial zone was established in 1992 along with the two other free trade zones Qeshm and Kish Island to use global expertise (mostly from South East Asia) as a tool for the development of the country, accelerating the accomplishment of infrastructure, creation of employment, and representation in global markets.

In February 2020, with the approval of the Islamic Consultative Assembly, Shahid Beheshti Port and Shahid Kalantari Port were incorporated into the Chabahar Free Trade-Industrial Zone. Under the plan to expand the zone, which was approved by the Islamic Consultative Assembly in February 2020, an additional area of 67,871 hectares was added to the existing zone. This expansion included the city of Chabahar, Shahid Kalantari Port, Shahid Beheshti Port, Tis New Town, Chabahar Industrial Estate, and the Rimdan border crossing."Chabahar Free Zone expansion plan approved" (in Persian).

== Main activities ==
The Chabahar Free Trade-Industrial Zone commenced its operations in 1995, with a primary focus on five major areas: the transit of merchandise goods, investment attraction and related services, tourism, construction and urban development, and education. These activities are overseen by the Chabahar Free Trade-Industrial Zone Organization, which is under public control.

== May 2016 agreements between Iran and India ==
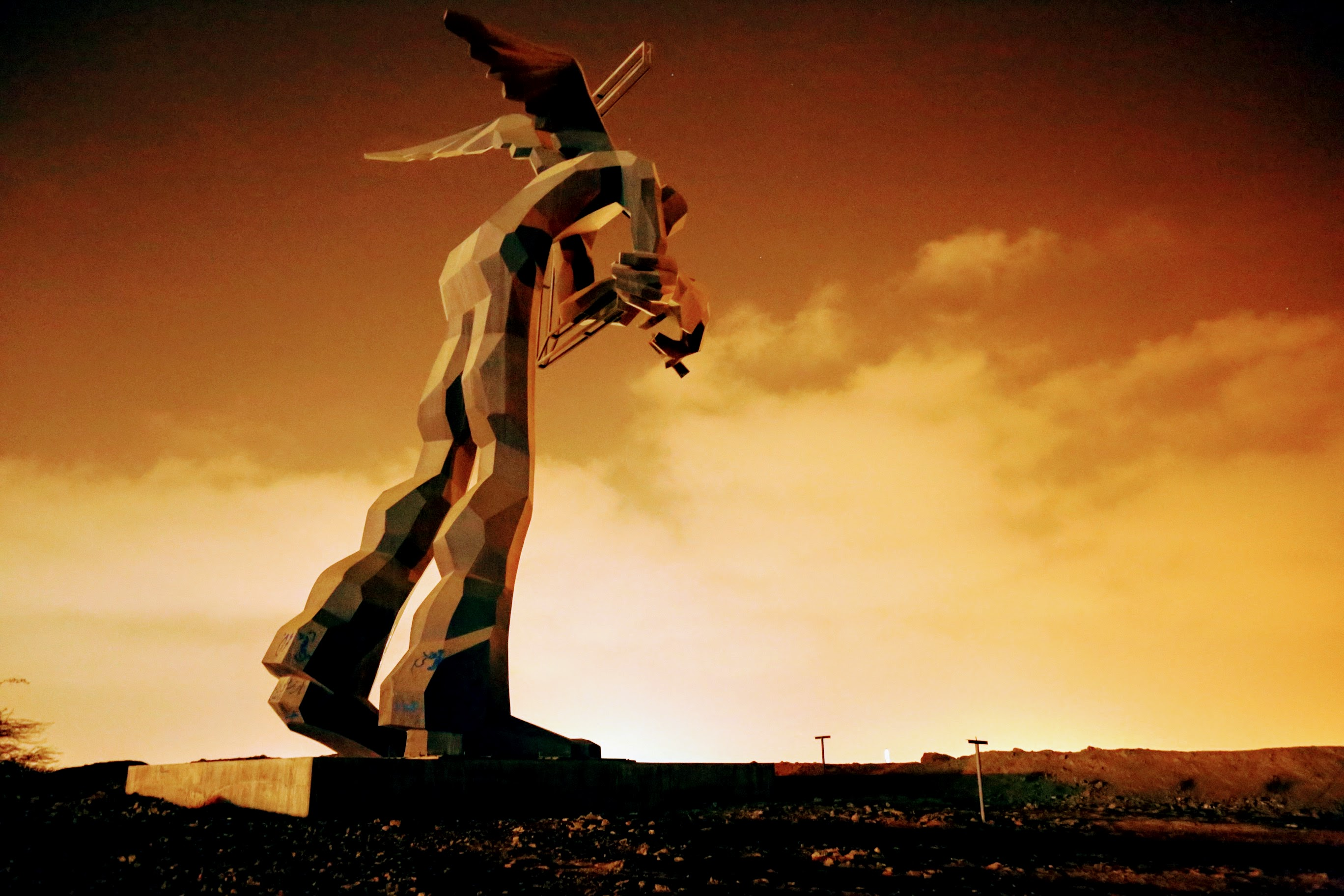
The statue of Chabahar Free Zone, Iran

After overseeing a series of agreements intending to develop the Port of Chabahar, India's Highways and Shipping Minister, Nitin Gadkari suggested that the Chabahar Free Trade-Industrial Zone had the potential to attract upwards of $15 billion worth of investment in the future, although he stated that such investments are predicated upon Iran offering India natural gas at a rate of $1.50 per million British Thermal Units, which is substantially lower than the rate of $2.95 per million British Thermal Units offered by Iran. The two countries also signed a memorandum of understanding to explore the possibility of setting up an aluminum smelter at a cost of $2 billion, as well as establishing a urea processing facility in Chahbahar, although these investments are also contingent upon Iran supplying low-cost natural gas for operation of those facilities.

== See also ==
- International rankings of Iran
