= Shahid Beheshti Port =

- Interactive map of Shahid Beheshti Port

Location
- Country: Iran Iran
- Location: Chabahar County, Sistan and Baluchestan province
- Coordinates: 25.296°N 60.611°E

Details
- Opened: 1995
- Owned by: Chabahar Free Trade-Industrial Zone
- Type of Harbor: Multipurpose
- Size: 8 berths

Shahid Beheshti Port is a port located in Chabahar County, on the coast of the Gulf of Oman and the Indian Ocean. It is of considerable commercial and strategic importance.

In 2007, the development plan for Shahid Beheshti Port covered a total area of 240 hectares, including 16 hectares of cargo-handling yards and 30,000 square metres of covered warehouses. The development plan to increase its cargo-handling capacity, particularly for ocean-going vessels, was underway.

The construction and installation of the port's grain-suction cranes, with a capacity of 600 tonnes per hour, were carried out by Machine Sazi Arak, although their design was developed by the German company Nairo.

== History ==
Shahid Beheshti Port was established as Iran's second most important port in 1993. Following the establishment of the Chabahar Free Trade–Industrial Zone and the need to expand maritime trade, construction of Shahid Beheshti Port began alongside Shahid Kalantari Port. The project was undertaken by the Khatam al-Anbiya Construction Headquarters, and the port opened in 1995 with three berths.

Construction work on the Shahid Beheshti Port development project in Chabahar began in August 2007 and was divided into five projects. An investment of US$1 billion was made to complete the first phase and purchase its equipment.

The first phase included the construction of a 1,650-metre breakwater; the construction of more than five kilometres of dikes; more than 60 hectares of concrete paving, tile laying and ground consolidation; a container terminal comprising two berths with a total length of 640 metres; three multipurpose berths with a total length of 750 metres; dredging 16 million cubic metres of material to a depth of 16 metres below sea level; and the reclamation of 203 hectares of new land using material obtained from dredging.

In late 2019, following the presentation of the functions and advantages of expanding the boundaries of the Chabahar Free Trade–Industrial Zone, the port area was incorporated into the Chabahar Free Trade–Industrial Zone.

== See also ==
- Chabahar Free Trade–Industrial Zone
