= Maharaja Bijli Pasi railway station =

Railway station in Uttar Pradesh, India

Maharaja Bijli Pasi railway station Nihalgarh railway station

General information
- Location: Nihalgarh Railway Station, State Highway 15, Jagdishpur Uttar Pradesh; India
- Elevation: 108 m (354 ft)
- System: Indian Railways station
- Owner: Indian Railways
- Operator: Northern Railway
- Line: Varanasi–Sultanpur–Lucknow line
- Platforms: 3 BG
- Tracks: 6 BG
- Connections: Taxi stand, auto stand

Construction
- Structure type: Standard (on-ground station)
- Parking: Available
- Cycle facilities: Available
- Accessible: Disabled access

Other information
- Status: Construction – Electric-line doubling
- Station code: MBLP (formerly NHH)
- Zone(s): Northern Railway
- Division(s): Lucknow NR
Location
- Location within India Location within Uttar Pradesh

Maharaja Bijli Pasi railway station, formerly known as Nihalgarh railway station (station code: MBLP, old code NHH) is a railway station in Amethi district, Uttar Pradesh. Its code is NHH. It serves Jagdishpur town. The station consists of two platforms. The main line of the Oudh and Rohilkhand Railway from Lucknow to Rae Bareli and Mughal Sarai serves the south-western portion. The Uttar Pradesh government changed the name of the station from Nihalgarh to Maharaja Bijli Pasi on 27 August 2024.

== Trains ==
Some of the trains that runs from Nihalgarh are :

- Lokmanya Tilak Terminus – Sultanpur Express
- Mahamana Express
- Suhaildev SF Express
- Begampura Express
- Himgiri Superfast Express
- Akal Takht Express
- Indore–Patna Express
- Marudhar Express (via Sultanpur)
- Sadbhavana Express
- Ahmedabad–Sultanpur Express
- Varanasi–Sultanpur Passenger
- Howrah–Amritsar Express

== See also ==
- Varanasi Junction railway station
- Sultanpur Junction railway station
- Varanasi–Sultanpur–Lucknow line
