= Shahid Kalantari Port =

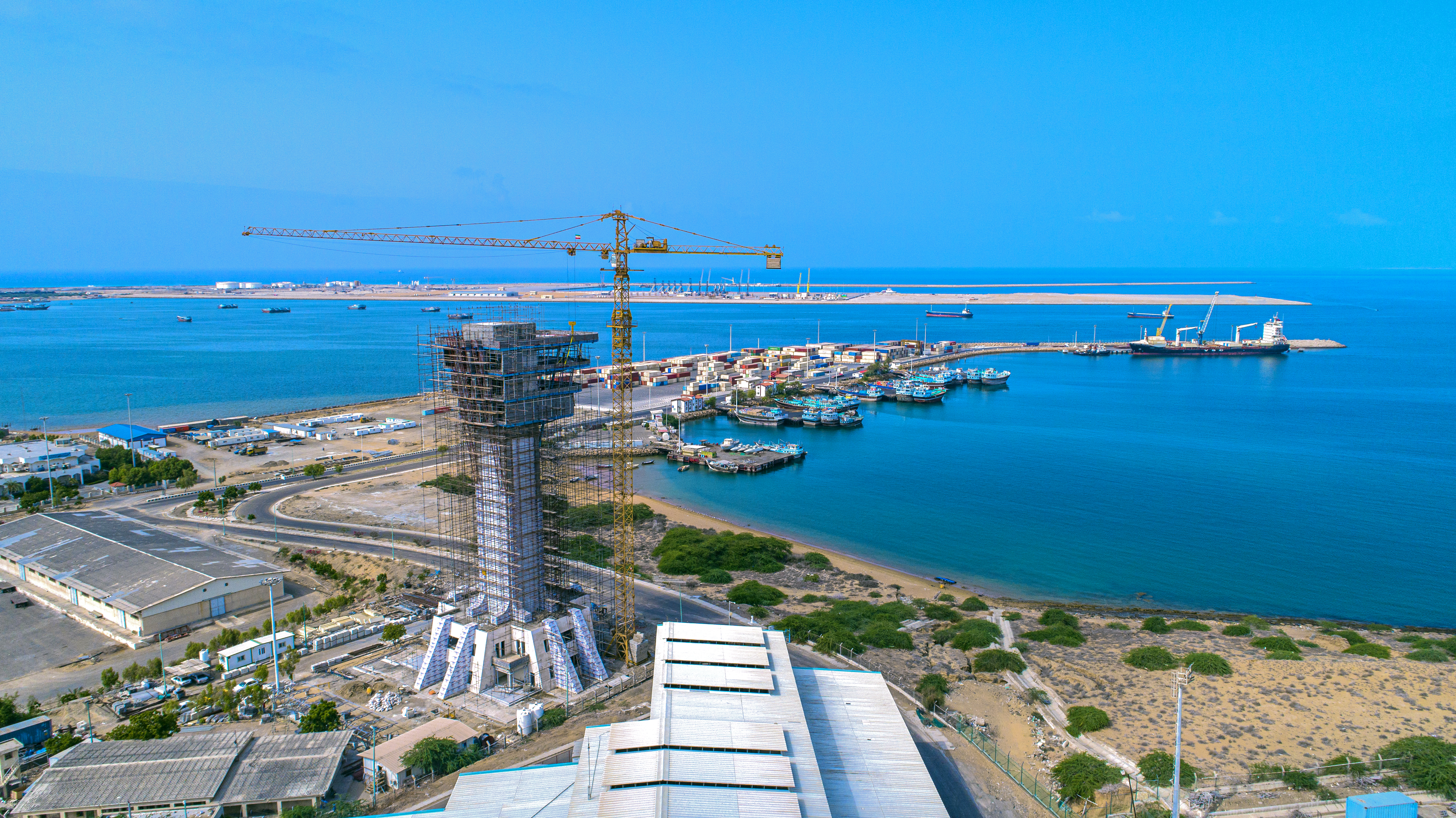
- Interactive map of Shahid Kalantari Port

Location
- Country: Iran
- Location: Chabahar County, Sistan and Baluchestan province
- Coordinates: 25.3124°N 60.6205°E

Details
- Opened: 1983
- Owned by: Chabahar Free Trade-Industrial Zone
- Type of Harbor: Multipurpose
- Size: 5 berths

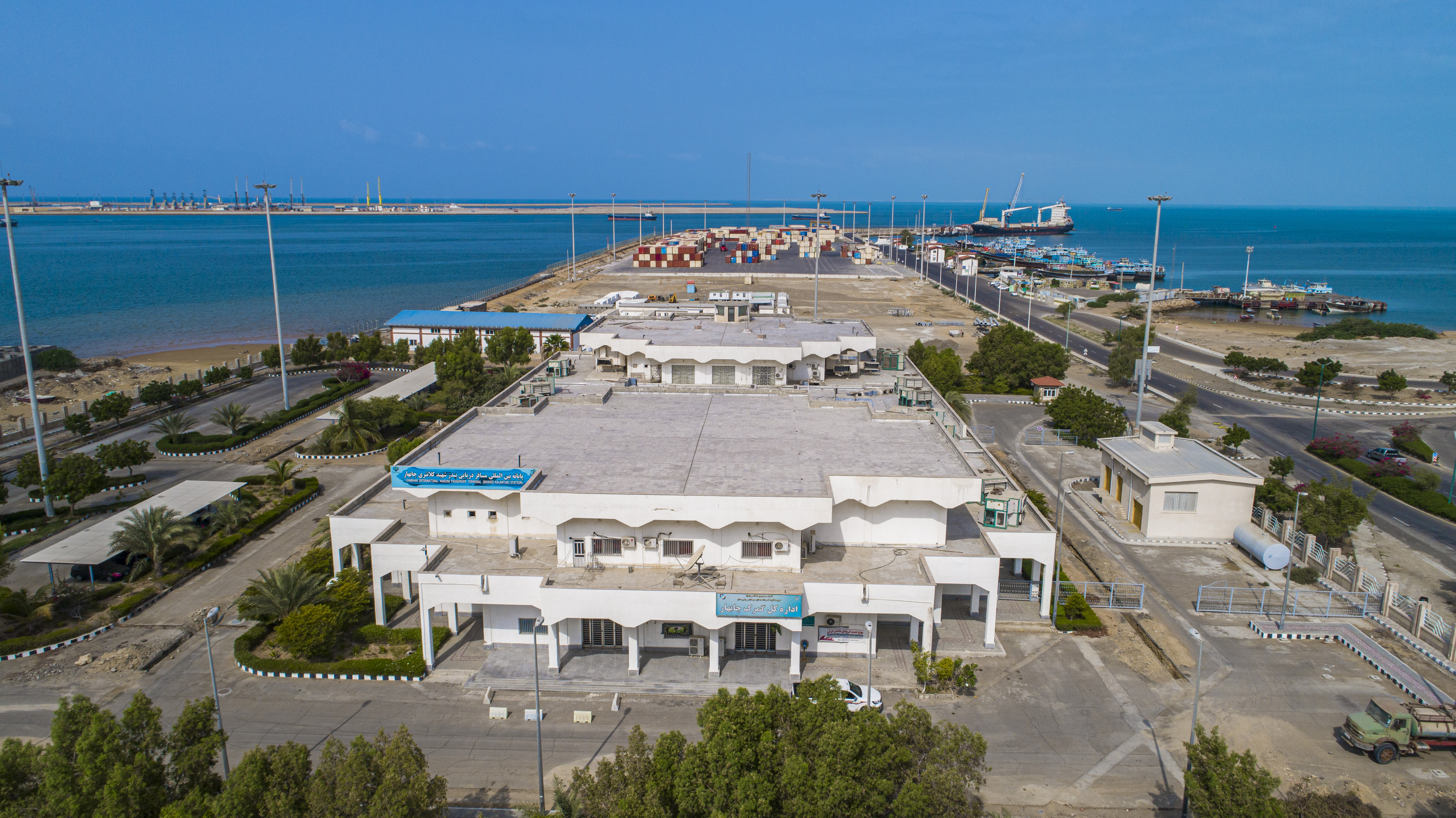
Shahid Kalantari Port passenger terminal

Shahid Kalantari Port is located in Chabahar County, Iran, on the coast of the Gulf of Oman and the Indian Ocean. It is of commercial and strategic importance.

During the war involving the United States and Israel against Iran, the port was reportedly attacked several times. On 16 July 2026, a US military attack completely destroyed the port's maritime control tower.

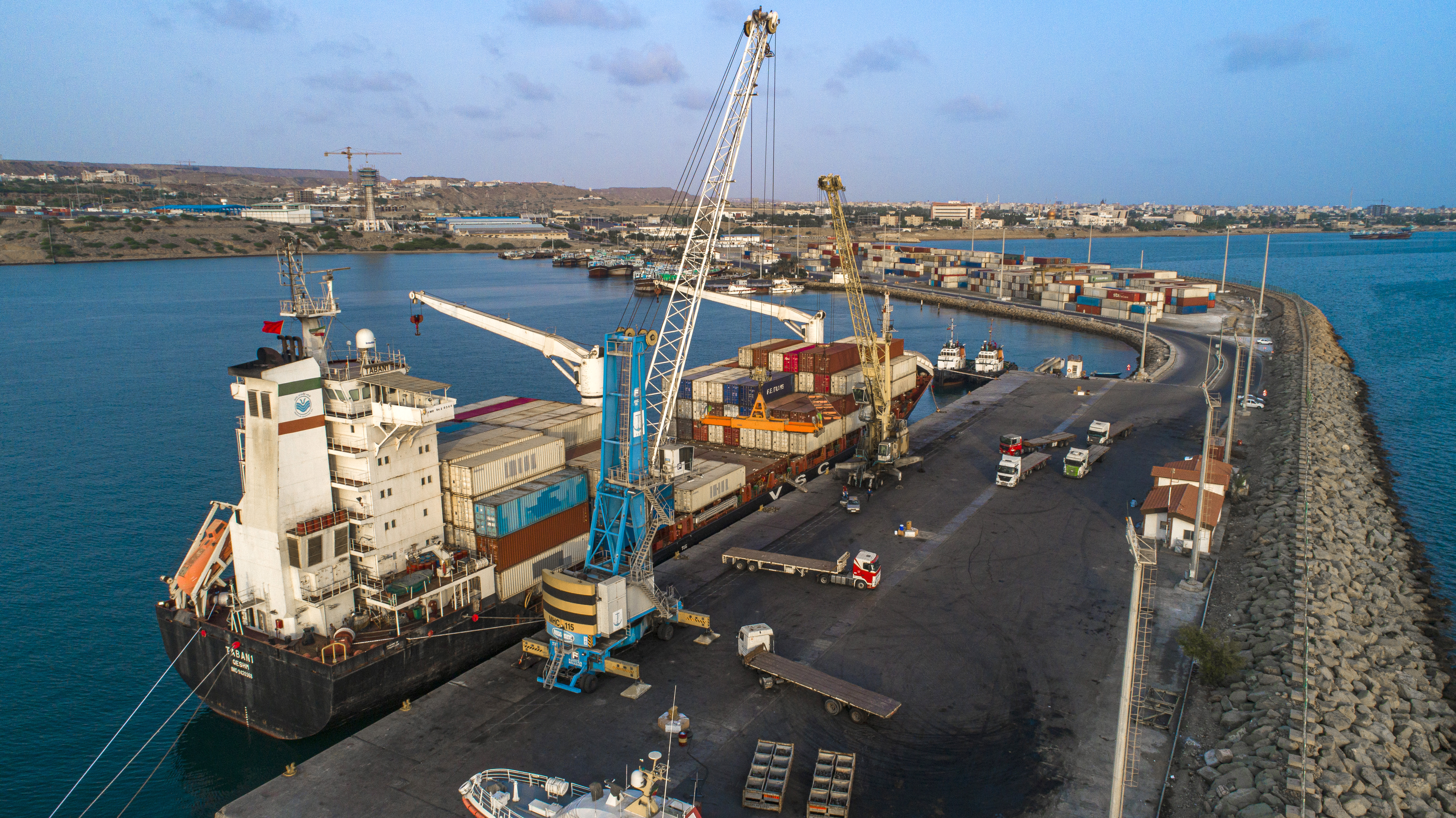
Cargo loading and unloading at Shahid Kalantari Port

== History ==
Construction of Shahid Kalantari Port began in 1983, amid the particular circumstances prevailing in the Persian Gulf during the Iran–Iraq War. The government emphasized the need for a port outside the Strait of Hormuz and the Persian Gulf. The project began in earnest in 1983, and the port effectively became operational in 1985 following the completion of four metal berths. Because of its location on the coast of the Gulf of Oman, far from the center of the conflict, the port played an important role in exports during the war.

In 2000, the Iranian government approved Shahid Kalantari Port as an authorized maritime border crossing for passenger entry and exit.

In 2009, Shahid Kalantari Port had a total area of 30 hectares, 35,000 square meters of cargo-handling yards, 3,000 square meters of covered warehouses, and a container yard covering 18,500 square meters. Its facilities included five multipurpose general-cargo berths, three berths for traditional cargo boats (lenj), and one military berth.

In late 2019, Shahid Kalantari Port was incorporated into the Chabahar Free Trade-Industrial Zone following discussions of the functions and advantages of expanding the zone.
