= Safdarganj =

- Village
- Location in Uttar Pradesh, India Safdarganj (India)
- Coordinates: 26.92°N 81.2°E
- Country: India
- State: Uttar Pradesh
- District: Barabanki

Government
  - Body: Gram panchayat
- Elevation: 125 m (410 ft)

Population (2001)
  - Total: 8,000
  - Density: 331/km^{2} (860/sq mi)

Languages
  - Official: Hindi, English
- Time zone: UTC+5:30 (IST)
- PIN: 225412
- Telephone code: 5248
- Vehicle registration: UP-41
- Website: barabanki.nic.in

Safdarganj is a village in the district of Barabanki and state of Uttar Pradesh in India. It is one of the developed and well known village of Barabanki District. This is situated some 15 km east of Barabanki, a district of Uttar Pradesh, one of major states in India.
