= Najibabad Junction railway station =

Railway station in Uttar Pradesh, India

Najibabad Junction

General information
- Location: Najibabad, Bijnor district, Uttar Pradesh; India
- Coordinates: 29.6038°N 78.3364°E
- Elevation: 268 metres (879 ft)
- System: Indian Railways station
- Owner: Indian Railways
- Operator: Northern Railways
- Platforms: 4
- Tracks: 4 (Double Electrified BG)
- Connections: Auto stand

Construction
- Structure type: Standard (on-ground station)
- Parking: Yes
- Cycle facilities: Yes

Other information
- Status: Functioning
- Station code: NBD
- Zone(s): Northern Railway zone
- Division(s): Moradabad Division
Location
- Location within India Location within Uttar Pradesh

Najibabad Junction railway station is a railway station in Bijnor district, Uttar Pradesh. Its code is NBD. It serves Najibabad city. The station consists of four platforms. The platforms are well sheltered.

== Trains ==
Some of the trains that run from Najibabad are:

- Jan Nayak Express
- Sidhbali Jan Shatabdi Express (previously Garhwal Express)
- Mussoorie Express
- Varanasi – Dehradun Janta Express
- Ganga Sutlej Express
- Rapti Ganga Express
- Kolkata–Jammu Tawi Express
- Amritsar–Saharsa Weekly Jansadharan Express
- Punjab Mail
- Harihar Express
- Ramnagar–Chandigarh Weekly InterCity Express
- Dehradun–Kathgodam Express
- Doon Express
- Jan Sewa Express
- Haridwar–Ramnagar Intercity Express
- Amritsar–Lalkuan Express
- Amritsar–Howrah Express
- Haridwar–Allahabad Express
- Garhwal Express (now Sidhbali Jan Shatabdi Express)
- Chandigarh–Lucknow SF Express
- Najibabad–Moradabad Passenger (via Gajraula)
- Najibabad Gajraula Passenger
- Najibabad Kotdwara Passenger
- Akal Takht Express
