= Pitambarpur railway station =

Railway station in Uttar Pradesh

- Indian Railways logo

General information
- Location: Faridpur, Bareilly, Uttar Pradesh; India
- Coordinates: 28.2002°N 79.5382°E
- Elevation: 170 metres (560 ft)
- System: Indian Railways station
- Owner: Indian Railways
- Operator: Northern Railway
- Line: Lucknow–Moradabad line
- Platforms: 3
- Connections: Auto stand

Construction
- Structure type: Standard (on-ground station)

Other information
- Station code: PMR
- Zone(s): Northern Railway
- Division(s): Moradabad
Location
- Location within Uttar Pradesh Location within India

Pitambarpur railway station (station code: PMR) is a railway station on the Lucknow–Moradabad line located in the town of Faridpur in Bareilly, Uttar Pradesh, India. It is under the administrative control of the Moradabad Division of the Northern Railway zone of the Indian Railways.

The station consists of three platforms, and is located at a distance of 19 kilometres (12 mi) from Bareilly Junction. Several Passenger and Express trains stop at the station.
