= Mukerian railway station =

Rail station in Punjab, India

Mukerian Railway Station
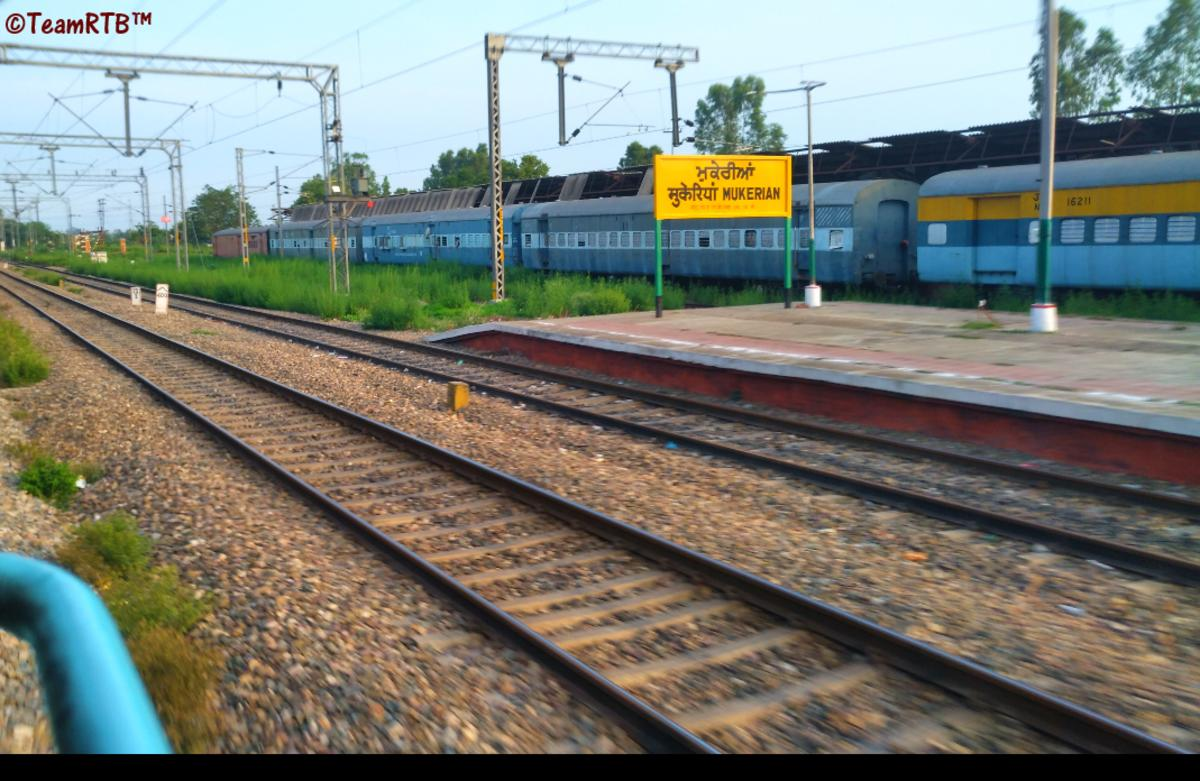
- Location in Punjab

General information
- Location: Kishan pura Mukerian city India
- Coordinates: 31°56′29″N 75°36′44″E
- Elevation: 257 metres (843 ft)
- System: Indian Railways station
- Owner: Indian Railways
- Operator: Northern Railway
- Line: Jalandhar–Jammu line
- Platforms: 3
- Tracks: 5 ft 6 in (1,676 mm) broad gauge

Construction
- Structure type: Standard on ground
- Parking: Yes
- Cycle facilities: Yes

Other information
- Status: Functioning
- Station code: MEX
- Division(s): Jammu

History
- Opened: 1915
- Rebuilt: after Indo-Pakistani war of 1965
- Electrified: 2014

Services
Preceding station	Indian Railways	Following station
Ghaunspur towards ?	Northern Railway zone Jalandhar–Jammu line	Mushahibpur towards ?
Location
- Location within Punjab Location within India

Mukerian railway station is located in Mukerian district in the Indian state of Punjab and serves Mukerian .

== The railway station ==
Mukerian railway station is at an elevation of 257 metres (843 ft) and was assigned the code – MEX.

== History ==
The line from Jalandhar City to Mukerian city was constructed in 1915. The Mukerian–Pathankot line was built in 1952. The construction of the Pathankot–Jammu Tawi line was initiated in 1965, after the Indo-Pakistani War of 1965, and opened in 1971.

== Electrification ==
Electrification work of the Jalandhar–Jammu line is on. As of 2010–11, around 100 km had been electrified. As of 2013, electrification was expected to be completed in about a year.
