= Mukerian =

- City
- Nickname: The City of Gardens
- Location in Punjab, India
- Coordinates: 31.95°N 75.62°E
- Country: India
- State: Punjab
- District: Hoshiarpur

Government
  - Type: Democratic

Area
  - Total: 25 km^{2} (9.7 sq mi)
- Elevation: 257 m (843 ft)

Population (2011)
  - Total: 129,841
  - Density: 5,200/km^{2} (13,000/sq mi)
- Time zone: UTC+5:30 (IST)
- PIN: 144211
- Telephone code: +01883
- Vehicle registration: PB54

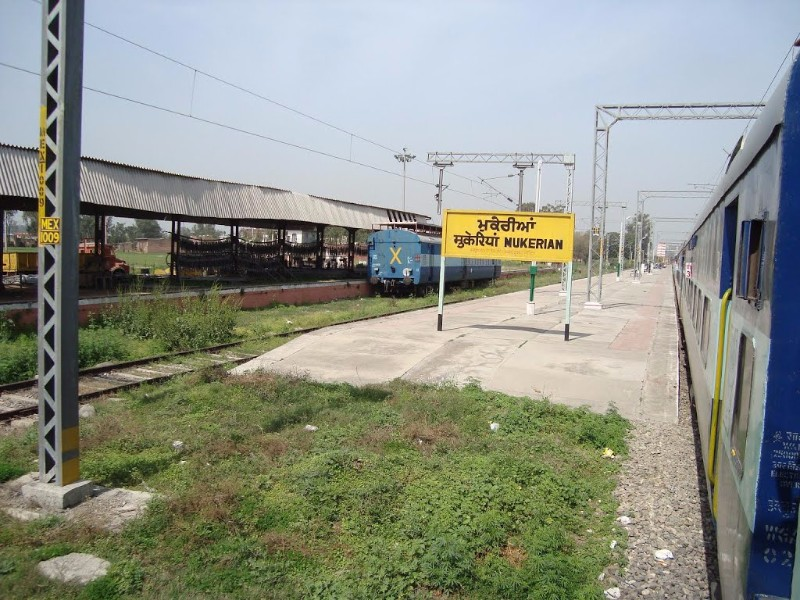

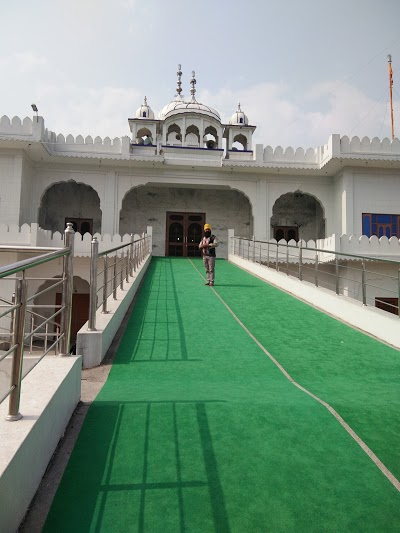

Mukerian is a city and Municipal council of Hoshiarpur district in Punjab, India. Mukerian is located on National Highway 44 and state highway 15 about 450 kilometres (280 mi) north of New Delhi. It is a district headquarters situated on Jalandhar-jammu railway line and is connected by road with Jalandhar, Hoshiarpur, Talwara, Gurdaspur and Pathankot. National Highway-44 also passes through here.

== Geography ==
Mukerian is located at 31.95°N 75.62°E. It has an average elevation of 245 metres (804 ft).

The Awans came to Makran from Arabia, Sindh, and then the Awans settled in the Beas River and the mountain range of Shawalak for centuries. This area of Awan was called Makranian, which became Makirian after Bagr. In the 12th century AD, Chaudhry Dara Awan laid the permanent foundation of Makirian. This area was granted as a jagir by Mahmud Ghaznavi and Shahabuddin Mahmud Ghori to the Awans. At that time, there were twelve settlements of Hindu Jaral Rajputs in the vicinity of Mansoorpur. During the Mughal era, Mukhiuddin Pur Dalil, whose old name is Pujowal, was also a village of Hindu Jaral Rajputs. The Awans built an Eid mosque in this area, but the Jaral Rajputs martyred this mosque. The Awans were very sad. The Awans massacred all the Hindu Jaral Rajputs under the command of the blessed Awan Panj Dhera clan, occupied their villages and eliminated all the Jaral Rajputs. Only one Jaral Rajput Khamla woman survived who had gone to her hometown Himachal. From this woman, the Jaral lineage was reborn. Awan is a fearless, brave, courageous warrior nation. No one could defeat the Awan nation in history. Until the partition of India in 1947, more than eighty villages including Makirian were inhabited in the area of Makirian. In August 1947, when no village or city was under siege in India and Pakistan, even then no one dared to attack Makirian and other Awan villages.expedition.

== Education ==
=== CBSE ===
- Anglo-Sanskrit Senior Secondary School, Mukerian
- Sri Guru Gobind Singh Public School, Beghpur Kamlooh
- Dashmesh Public School, Chak ala Baksh
- Victoria International School, Mukerian
- Army Public School, Unchi Bassi
- Springdales Public School
- Woodbury World School,.Piru chak
- C.D Gurukul International school
- Cambridge Overseas School, Mukerian

=== ICSE ===
- The Sovereign School, Mansar
- St. Augustine School, Pandori
- St. Joseph's Convent School, Mukerian

=== College ===
- Dashmesh Girls' College, Chak ala baksh
- S.P.N. College, Mukerian

=== Engineering colleges ===
- S.B.C.M.S. Institute Of Technology

=== Polytechnic ===
- Brahm Kamal Polytechnic College

=== ITI ===
- MATA VIDYAWATI MEMORIAL ITI

== Transport ==
The city has a railway station and various road links. It is located on National Highway 44, which connects Jammu and Kashmir to the rest of India, and state highways connect it with the city of Hoshiarpur as well as Talwara and Hajipur. Other connecting roads link Mukerian with Amritsar, Daulatpur, and Kapurthala.

== Demographics ==
The table below shows the population of different religious groups in Mukerian city, as of 2011 census.

Population by religious groups in Mukerian city, 2011 census
Religion	Total	Female	Male
Hindu	100,121	48,058	52,063
Sikh	25,319	12,118	13,201
Christian	3382	1623	1758
Muslim	879	421	457
Jain	67	30	37
Buddhist	4	2	2
Not stated	69	37	32
Total	129,841	62,326	67,515
