= Pathankot Cantonment railway station =

Railway station in Pathankot, Punjab, India

Pathankot Cantonment
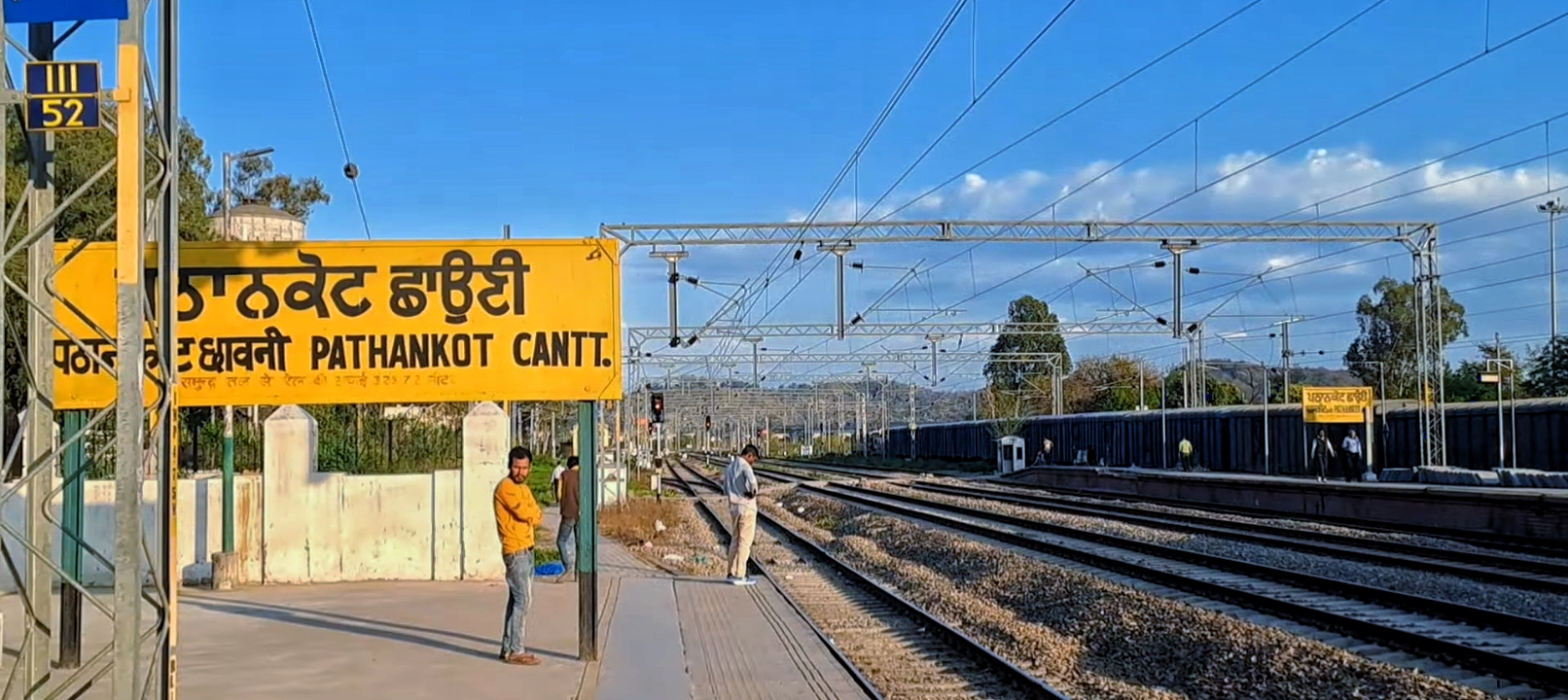
- Pathankot Cantonment Railway Station

General information
- Location: National Highway 44, Pathankot, Punjab; India
- Coordinates: 32°15′33″N 75°38′10″E
- Elevation: 328 metres (1,076 ft)
- System: Indian Railways
- Owner: Indian Railways
- Operator: Northern Railways
- Lines: Jalandhar–Jammu line Kangra Valley Railway; Amritsar–Pathankot line
- Platforms: 3
- Tracks: 5 ft 6 in (1,676 mm) broad gauge

Construction
- Structure type: At grade
- Parking: Yes
- Cycle facilities: No

Other information
- Status: Functioning
- Station code: PTKC
- Zone(s): Northern Railway
- Division(s): Jammu

History
- Opened: 1952

Services
Preceding station	Indian Railways	Following station
Kandrori towards ?	Northern Railway zone Jalandhar–Jammu line	Pathankot Junction towards ?
Bharoli towards ?	Northern Railway zone Amritsar–Pathankot line	Terminus
Location
- Location within Punjab

Pathankot Cantonment railway station (station code: PTKC) is located in Pathankot district in the Indian state of Punjab and serves Pathankot.

== Name change ==
Chakki Bank railway station was renamed Pathankot Cantonment railway station in 2013.

== The railway station ==
Pathankot Cantonment railway station is at an elevation of 328 metres (1,076 ft) and was assigned the code – PTKC.

== History ==
The 107 km (66 mi)-long 5 ft 6 in (1,676 mm) broad gauge Amritsar–Pathankot line was opened in 1884.

The 164 km (101.9 mi)-long 762 mm (2 ft 6 in)-wide narrow-gauge Kangra Valley Railway from Pathankot to Joginder Nagar was commissioned in 1929.

The line from Jalandhar City to Mukerian was constructed in 1915. The Mukerian–Pathankot line was built in 1952. The construction of the Pathankot–Jammu Tawi line was initiated in 1965, after the Indo-Pakistani War of 1965, and opened in 1971.

== Electrification ==
Electrification work of the Jalandhar–Jammu line is completed in 2015.

== Loco shed ==
Pathankot Cantonment had a steam loco shed which has now been decommissioned.
