= Yamunanagar-Jagadhri railway station =

Railway station in Haryana, India

Yamunanagar-Jagadhri
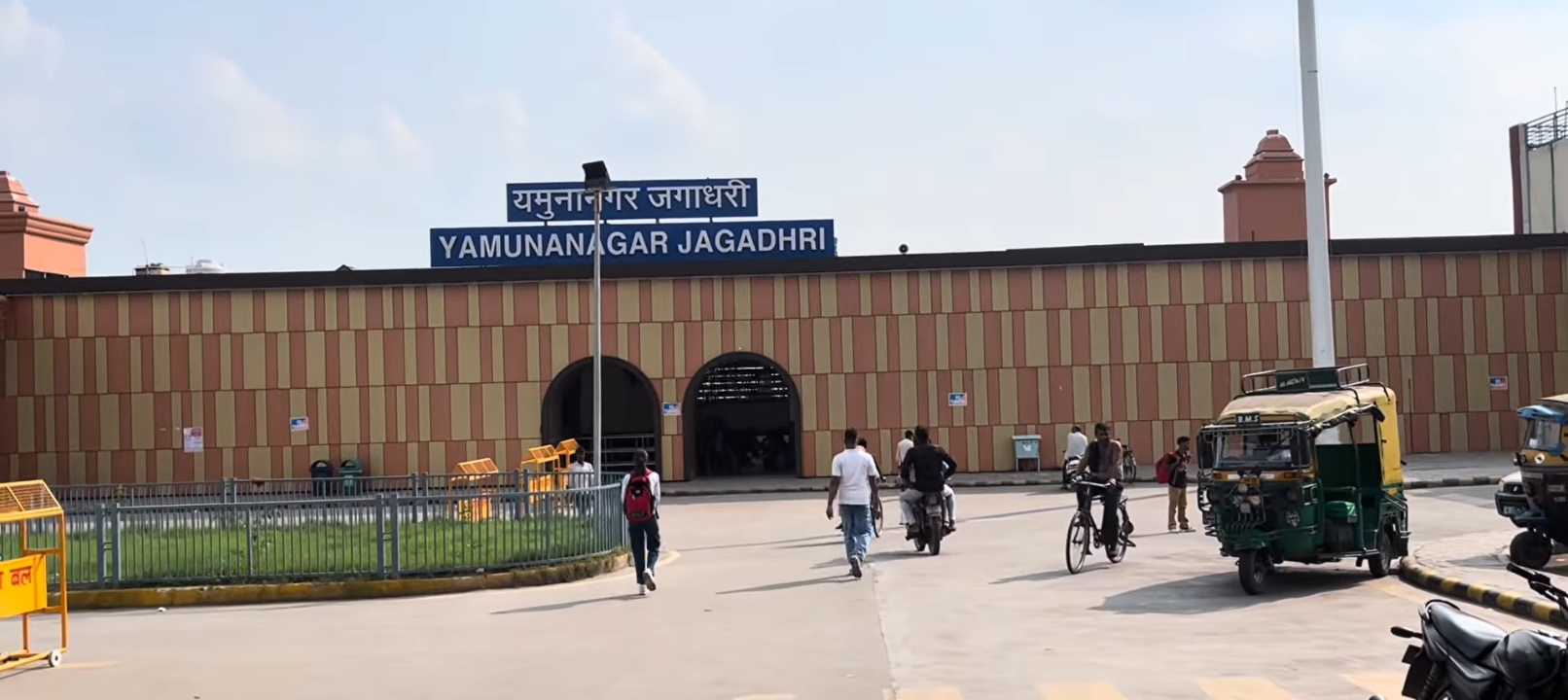
- Yamunanagar-Jagadhri Railway Station main Entrance

General information
- Location: Radur Road, Viskarma Mohall, Yamunanagar, Haryana; India
- Coordinates: 30.1173°N 77.2877°E
- Elevation: 274 metres (899 ft)
- System: Indian Railways
- Owner: Ministry of Railways (India)
- Operator: Indian Railways
- Line: Moradabad–Ambala line
- Platforms: 3 (1,2,3)

Construction
- Structure type: At grade
- Parking: Yes
- Cycle facilities: No

Other information
- Status: Functioning
- Station code: YJUD
- Zone(s): Northern Railway
- Division(s): Ambala

History
- Electrified: Yes (in 1996–98)
Location

Yamunanagar-Jagadhri railway station is a station on the Moradabad–Ambala line. It is located in the Indian state of Haryana.

== History ==
The Scinde, Punjab & Delhi Railway completed the 483 km (300 mi)-long Amritsar–Ambala–Jagadhri–Saharanpur–Ghaziabad line in 1870 connecting Multan (now in Pakistan) with Delhi.

== Electrification ==
Ambala–Jagadhri–Saharanpur sector in 1996–98.

== Important trains ==
There are some important trains at Jagadhri railway station

- 18237/38 Chhattisgarh Express
- 22687/88 Madurai–Dehradun Express
- 12207/08 Kathgodam–Jammu Tawi Garib Rath Express
- 12903/04 Golden Temple Mail
- 12231/32 Lucknow–Chandigarh Express
- 13005/06 Amritsar Mail
- 14609/10 Hemkunt Express
- 12053/54 Haridwar–Amritsar Jan Shatabdi Express
- 14523/24 Harihar Express

== Carriage & Wagon Workshop, Jagadhri ==
Carriage & Wagon Workshop, Jagadhari is in Yamunanagar district of Haryana. It is among the eight workshops operated by Northern Railways.
