= Milak =

- city
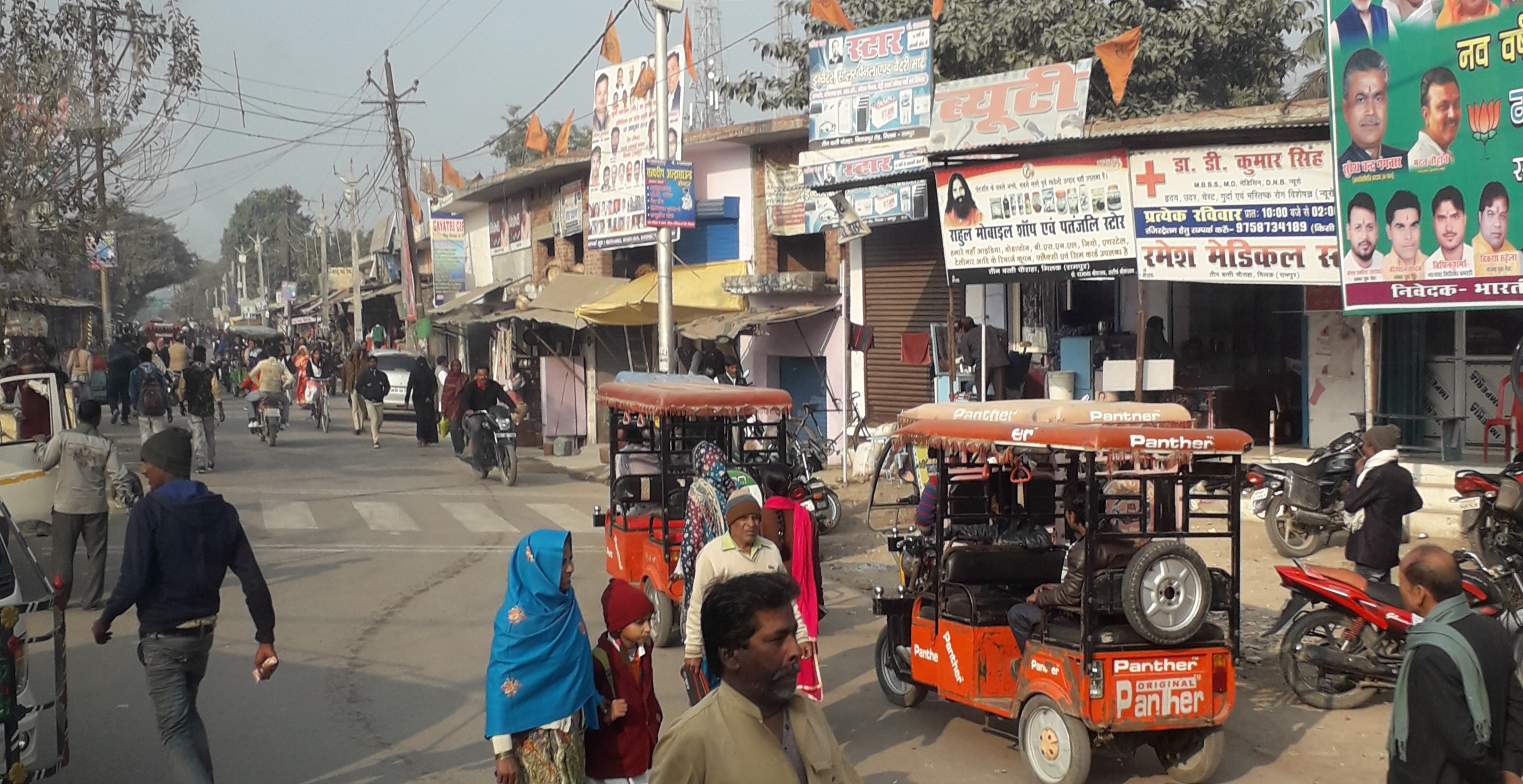
- Bilaspur road near Town Centre, Milak

- Location in Uttar Pradesh, India Milak (India)
- Coordinates: 28°36′44″N 79°10′09″E
- Country: India
- State: Uttar Pradesh
- District: Rampur
- Elevation: 173 m (568 ft)

Population (2001)
  - Total: 25,559

Languages
  - Official: Hindi
- Time zone: UTC+5:30 (IST)
- Vehicle registration: UP 22
- Website: up.gov.in

Milak is a city and a municipal board in Rampur district in the Indian state of Uttar Pradesh.In field of legal education there is one Law college at village Guladia Bhatt Milak–Bilaspur road in name of Rampur College of Law Milak imparting legal education among students in whole Rampur district. Also there are several inter college and 3 degree colleges nearby: Rambahadur Degree college, Shri Hansraj Degree College, Shri Hira Mahavidyalaya.

Its nearby cities are Rampur, Rudrapur and Bareilly.

== Geography ==
Milak is located at 28.610°N 79.168°E. It has an average elevation of 173 metres (567 feet).

== Demographics ==
As of 2001 India census, Milak had a population of 25,559. Males constitute 53% of the population and females 47%. Milak has an average literacy rate of 67%, higher than the national average of 59.5%: male literacy is 76%, and female literacy is 58%. In Milak, 19% of the population is under 6 years of age.
