= Archana Express =

Train in India

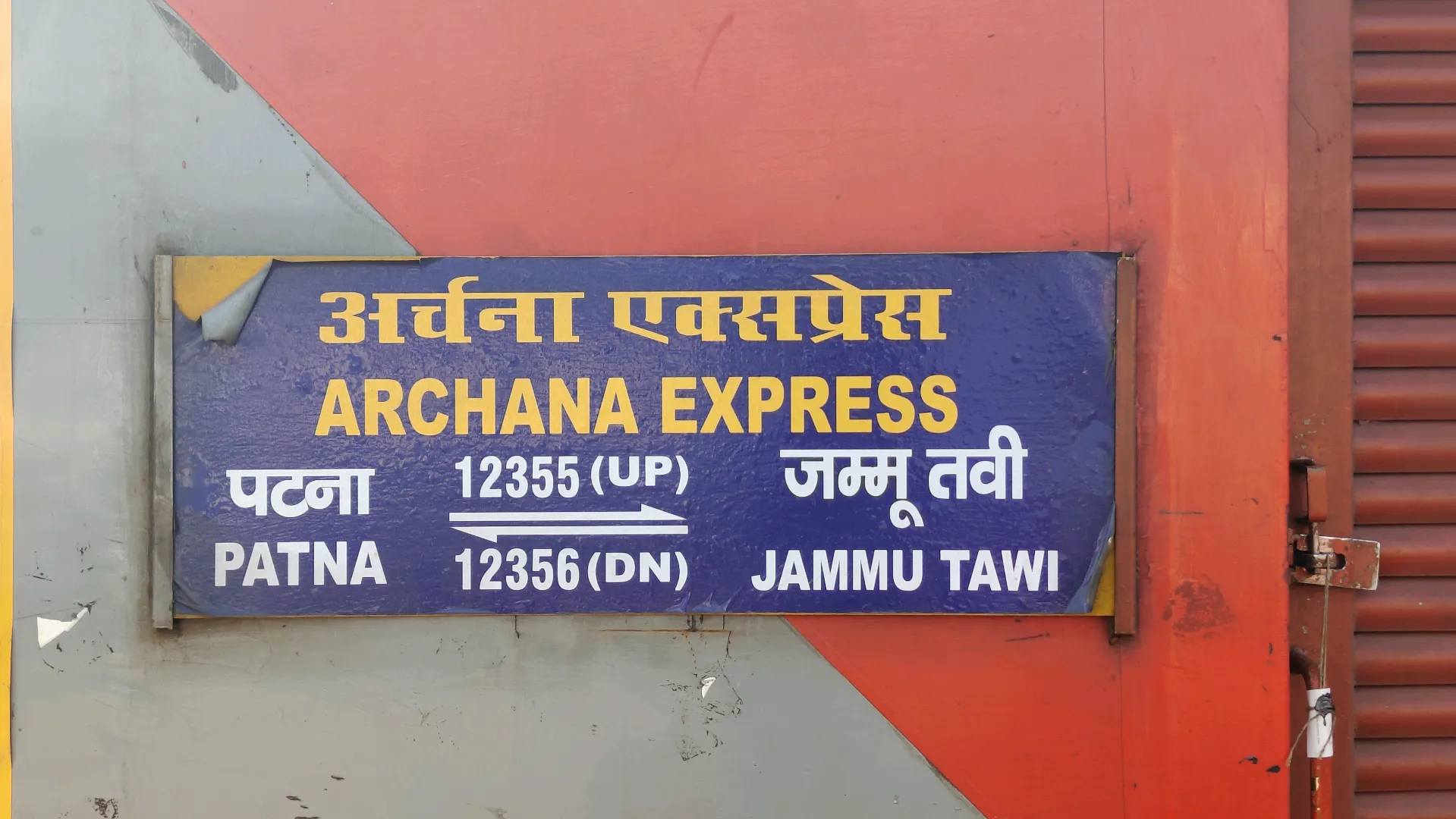

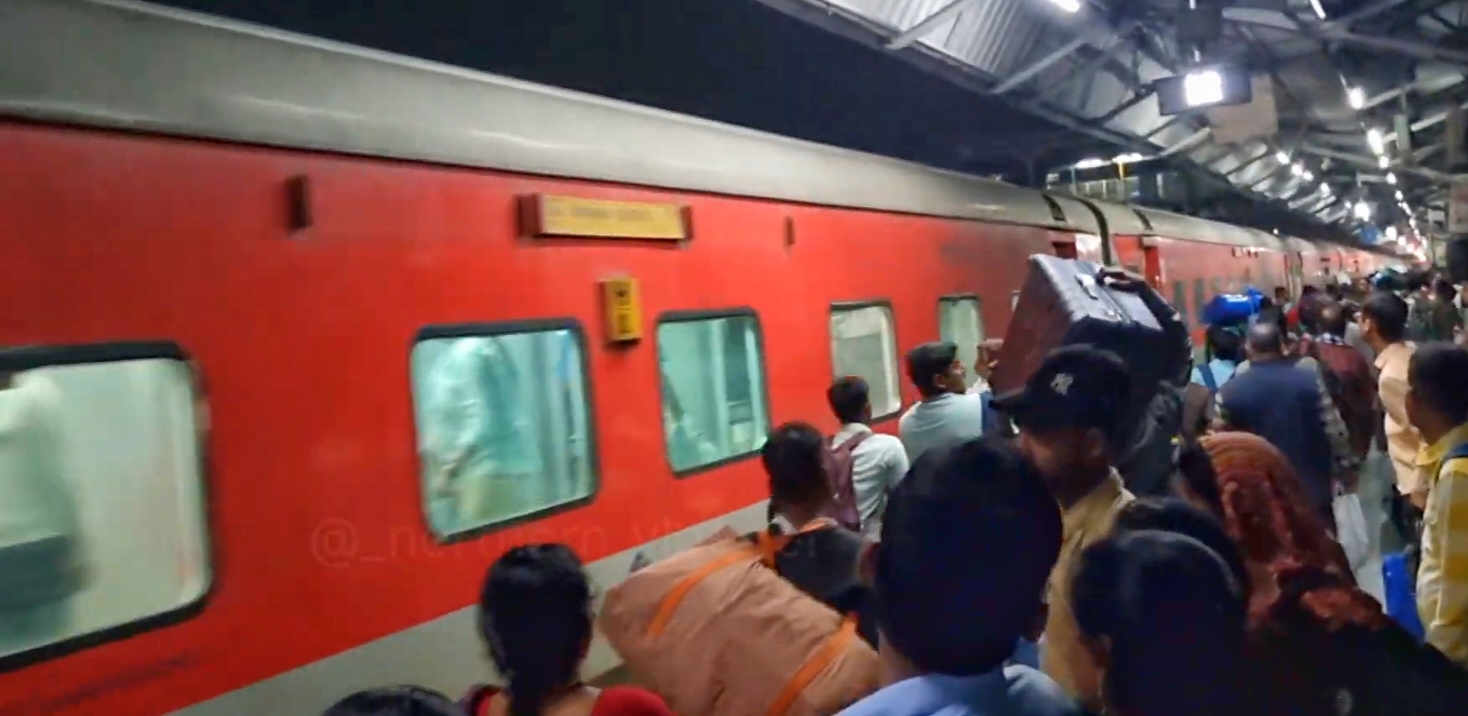
- Archana Express At Ludhiana Junction railway station

Overview
- Service type: Superfast
- First service: 1 January 2003; 23 years ago
- Current operator: East Central Railway

Route
- Termini: Patna Junction (PNBE); Jammu Tawi (JAT)
- Stops: 18
- Distance travelled: 1,515 km (941 mi)
- Average journey time: 26 hrs 50 mins
- Service frequency: Bi-weekly.
- Train number: 12355 / 12356

On-board services
- Classes: AC 2 Tier, AC 3 Tier, Sleeper Class, General Unreserved
- Seating arrangements: Yes
- Sleeping arrangements: Yes
- Catering facilities: Available
- Observation facilities: Large windows
- Baggage facilities: No
- Other facilities: Below the seats

Technical
- Rolling stock: LHB coach
- Track gauge: 1,676 mm (5 ft 6 in)
- Operating speed: 130 km/h (81 mph) maximum, 56 km/h (35 mph) average including halts.
Route map
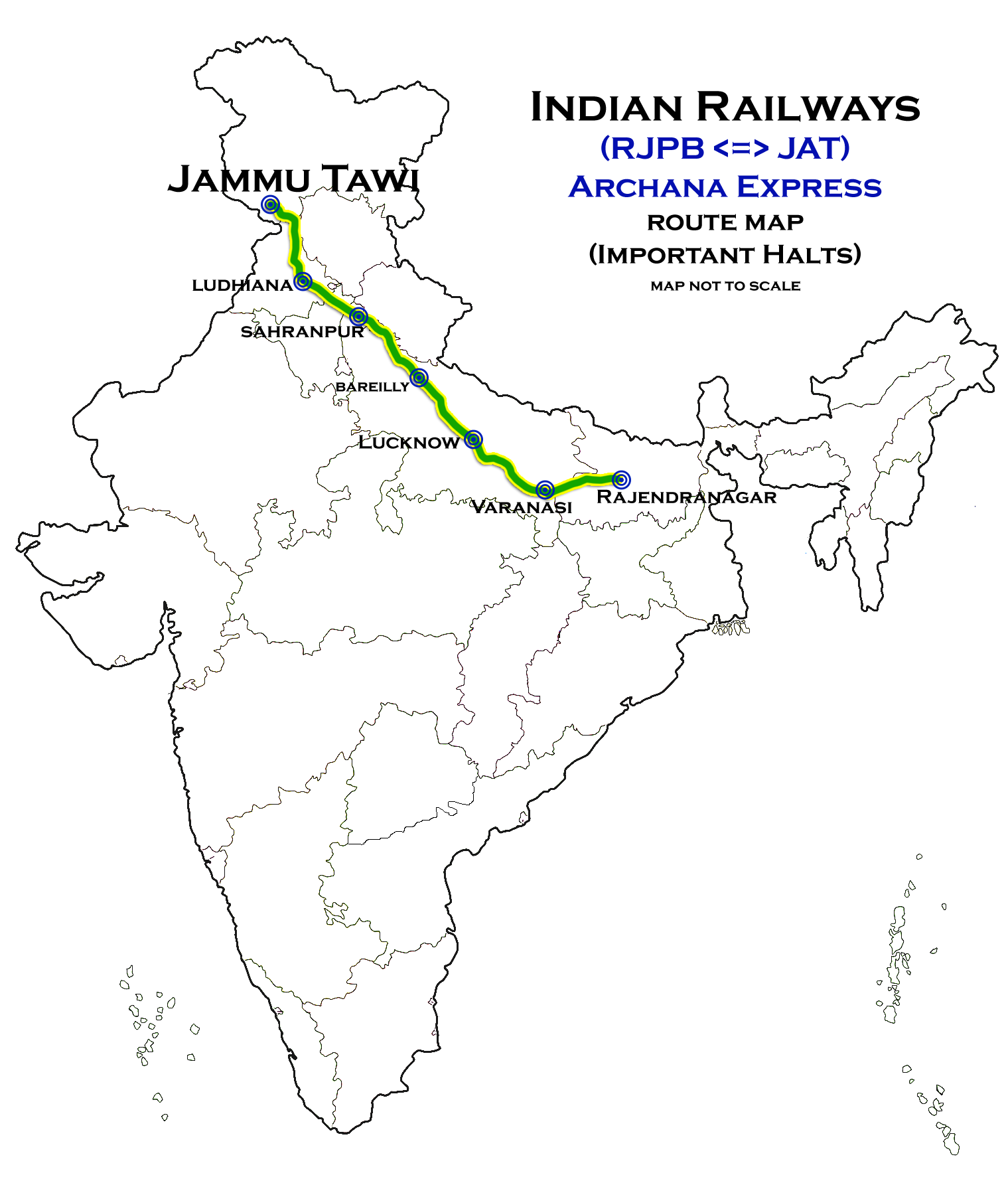

The 12355 / 12356 Archana Express is a superfast express train belonging to Indian Railways – East Central Railway zone that runs between Patna Junction and Jammu Tawi in India.

It operates as train number 12355 from Patna Junction to Jammu Tawi and as train number 12356 in the reverse direction, serving the states of Bihar, Uttar Pradesh, Haryana, Punjab and Jammu and Kashmir.

== Coach composition ==
Coach Type	Code(s)	Count
Luggage/Parcel	LPR	1
General Un-Reserved	GEN	4
Sleeper	S1–S6	6
Pantry Car	PC	1
3AC Economy	M1	1
3AC	B1–B5	5
2AC	A1–A2	2
1AC	H1	1
2nd Sitting	DL1	1
Total Coaches		22

== Service ==
When introduced into service in the 1990s, Archana Express was numbered 3289/3290 and had a moderate time table. 13289 departing Patna at 07.30 am, Mughalsarai at 11.15 am, Varanasi at 12.06 pm, Lucknow at 17.45 pm, Bareilly at 21.50 pm, Moradabad at 23.30 pm, Laksar at 01.54 am, Saharanpur at 03.00 am; Ambala Cantt at 04.40 am, Ludhiana at 07.00 am, Pathankot Junction at 10.05 am with reversal & Jammu Tawi arrival at 12.00 pm the next day. Later it used was made to run via Pathankot Cantt. In return 13290 Jammu Tawi departure was 23.45 pm, Ludhiana at 04.50 am; Ambala Cantt at 07.01 am; Saharanpur at 08.35 am; Laksar at 09.31 am; Moradabad at 12.05 pm; Bareilly at 13.45 pm, Lucknow at 18.15 pm, Varanasi at 23.45 pm, Mughalsarai at 00.35 am, arriving Patna at 04.15 am. It used to cover 1,509 km (938 mi) in 28 hrs 30 mins (52.95 km/h).

Since 2005, The 12355 Patna Junction–Jammu Tawi Archana Express covers the distance of 1,509 km (938 mi) in 27 hours 00 mins (55.89 km/h) and in 27 hours 00 mins as 12356 Jammu Tawi–Patna Junction Archana Express (55.89 km/h).

As the average speed of the train is above 55 km/h (34 mph), as per Indian Railways rules, its fare includes a Superfast surcharge.

== Routeing ==
Station Name	Code	Distance (KM)
Patna Junction	PNBE	0
Danapur	DNR	10
Ara	ARA	49
Buxar	BXR	118
Pt. Deen Dayal Upadhyaya Junction	DDU	208
Varanasi	BSB	226
Bhadohi	BOY	270
Maa Belha Devi Dham Pratapgarh	MBDP	354
Amethi	AME	389
Jais	JAIS	420
Rae Bareli Junction	RBL	449
Lucknow Junction	LKO	527
Bareilly (NR)	BE	762
Moradabad	MB	852
Saharanpur Junction	SRE	1045
Ambala Cantt Junction	UMB	1126
Ludhiana Junction	LDH	1240
Jalandhar Cantt	JRC	1292
Pathankot Cantt	PTKC	1405
Jammu Tawi	JAT	1504

== Traction ==
As route is now fully electrified, it is hauled by a Samastipur Loco Shed / Gomoh Loco Shed-based WAP-7 electric locomotive on its entire journey.

== Operation ==
12355 Patna Junction–Jammu Tawi Archana Express runs from Patna Junction every Tuesday and Saturday, reaching Jammu Tawi the next day.

12356 Jammu Tawi–Patna Junction Archana Express runs from Jammu Tawi every Wednesday and Sunday, reaching Patna Junction the next day.
