= Chabahar =

City in Sistan and Baluchestan province, Iran

Chahbahar چابهار
- Port city
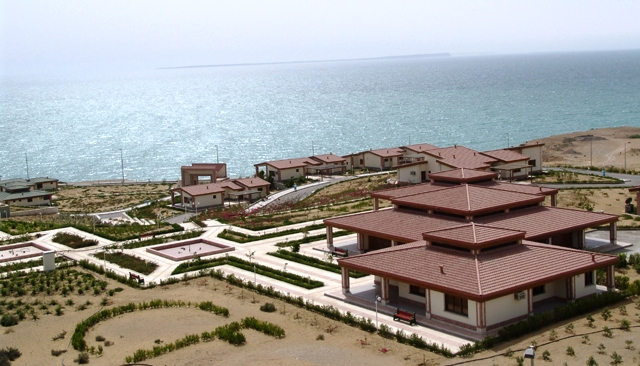
- Coastline at Chabahar

- Location within Iran
- Coordinates: 25°17′34″N 60°38′59″E
- Country: Iran
- Province: Sistan and Baluchestan
- County: Chabahar
- District: Central

Population (2016 Census)
  - Total: 106,739
- Time zone: UTC+3:30 (IRST)
- Website: chabahar.ir

Chabahar (Persian: چابهار; Balochi: چھبار) (Note: Also romanized as Chābahār; English: Four Springs or Spring Well, also romanized as Čahbàr; formerly Bandar Beheshtī and Chah Bahar (چاه بهار)) is a city in the Central District of Chabahar County, (Note: Formerly Chah Bahar County) Sistan and Baluchestan province, Iran, serving as capital of both the county and the district. It is a free port (free-trade zone) situated on the coast of the Gulf of Oman. The city has two multi-purpose commercial ports, Shahid Beheshti Port and Shahid Kalantari Port, on its coast.]. The sister port city of Gwadar in Balochistan, Pakistan, is located about 170 kilometres (110 mi) to the east of Chabahar.

== Etymology ==
The name Chabahar is a shortened form of the Persian phrase chahar bahar (Persian: چهاربهار), where chahar means "four" and bahar means "spring". Hence, Chabahar means a place where all four seasons of the year resemble spring time.

== History ==
There is a fishing village and former port named Tis in Chabahar's neighborhood, which dates from 2500 BC, known in Alexander the Great's conquests as Tiz, eventually renamed Tis. In addition, in his book Aqd al-Ala lel-Moghefe al Ahla, Afdhal al-Din abu Hamid Kermani wrote in 584 AH (1188 CE) about the port of Tiz and its commerce and trade.

According to the scholar and historian, Alberuni, author of an encyclopedic work on India called "Tarikh Al-Hind", the sea coast of India commences with Tiz or modern Chabahar. Tis was formerly an active commercial port, and was destroyed by the Mongols. There are still some ruins in the village.

The Portuguese were the first European colonial country to attack the Makran (Oman) Sea. The Portuguese forces under Afonso de Albuquerque gained control of Chabahar and Tis (1616 CE or 1026 AH), staying there until 1031 AH (1621 CE). The English later entered the region.

Modern Chabahar dates back to around 1970 CE, when it was declared a municipality and large port projects were started by order of Mohammad Reza Pahlavi. A modern naval and air base was established as part of the Shah's policy of making Iran into a dominant power in the Indian Ocean. At that time these and other development projects in and around Chabahar involved the extensive participation of foreign companies, especially from the United States. After the 1979 CE revolution the foreign companies left the projects and Iranian public companies linked to the Ministry of Jahad-e Sazandegi (or jihad for construction) took them over.

The Iran–Iraq War caused Chabahar to gain in logistical and strategic importance. War brought insecurity to the Strait of Hormuz and ships were unable to enter the Persian Gulf. Accordingly, Chabahar became a major port during the war. In the 1980s the Iranian government developed a new scheme named the Eastern Axis Development Scheme, which aimed to use Chabahar's geographical position as a regional development tool to stimulate economic growth in the eastern provinces. The establishment of the Chabahar Free Trade-Industrial Zone in 1992 resulting from the EAD Scheme brought development and encouraged immigration from other parts of the country to Chabahar.

On 25 February 2025, clashes between the Iranian Revolutionary Guard Corps and Jaish al-Adl, a Sunni militant group have taken place in Chabahar. At least one civilian, a 5-year-old child, has died. Two more Jaish al-Adl combatants have also died. Days earlier, Jaish al-Adl bombed an Iranian government building.

On 7 April 2026, explosions were heard at three sites in the city: the Shahid Kalantari port, the Tis port, and the Imam Ali base.

== Population ==
At the time of the 2006 National Census, the city's population was 71,070 in 13,837 households. The following census in 2011 counted 85,633 people in 19,313 households. The 2016 census measured the population of the city as 106,739 people in 25,896 households.

== Economy ==
=== Chabahar Free Trade Zone ===
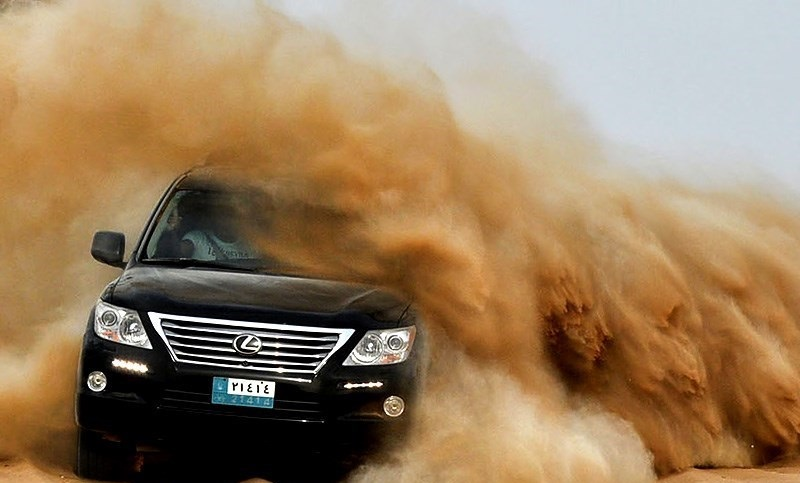
Chabahar Rally

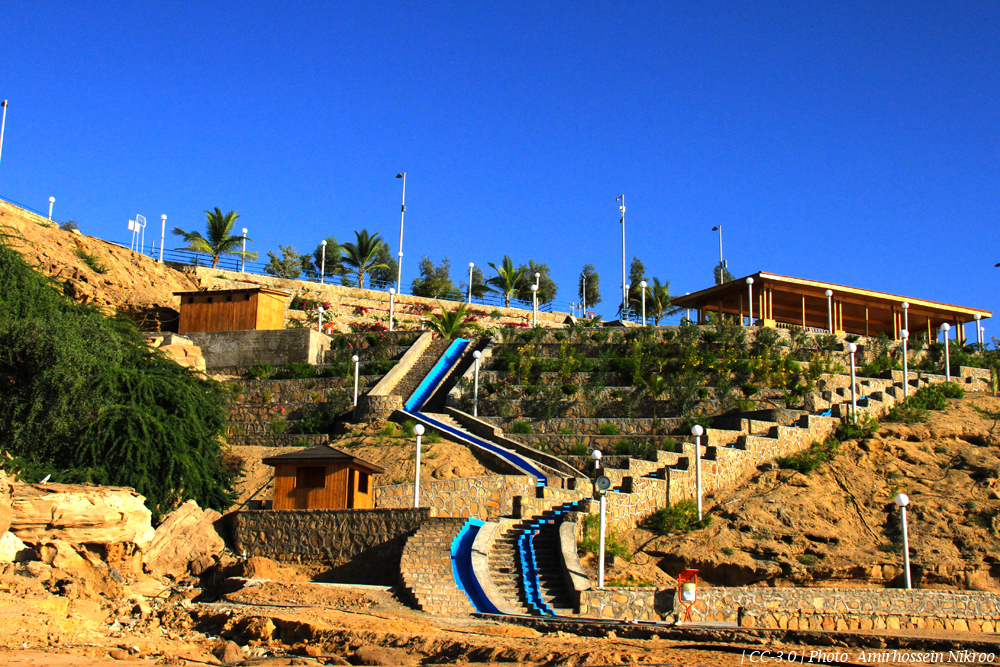
View of a park in Chabahar Beach

Chabahar is Iran's closest access point to the Indian Ocean. For this reason, Chabahar is the focal point of Iranian development in the east of the country through expansion and enhancement of transit routes among countries situated in the northern part of the Indian Ocean and Central Asia.

Chabahar's economic sectors are fish industries and commercial sector, fishery sectors with the largest amount of country's fish catch, mainly located out of the Chabahar Free Trade-Industrial Zone. Growing commercial sector located at free trade area with high potentiality to turn to a place that would connect business growth centers in south Asia (India) and Middle East (Dubai) to central Asian market. The government plans to link the Chabahar free trade area to Iran's main rail network, which is connected to Central Asia.

The city is served by Refah Chain Stores Co., Iran Hyper Star, Isfahan City Center, Shahrvand Chain Stores Inc., Ofoq Kourosh chain store.

== Transportation ==
Chabahar is connected to multimodal transportation through air, sea and roads. Its Konarak Airport has twice daily flights to the capital Tehran, thrice weekly flights to Zahedan and twice weekly flights to Mashhad, Shiraz and Bandar Abbas. It has also a weekly international flight to Doha and Dubai and a biweekly flight to Muscat. Chabahar has two jetties that connect it to international waterways. Iranian contractors are developing both jetties to provide port facilities for handling of 6 million tons of goods a year; this is expected to be completed by 2011. Chabahar is connected to national road networks. Chabahar–Bandar Abbas, Chabahar–Iranshahr–Kerman, Chabahar–Iranshahr–Zahedan–Mashahd and Chabahar–Iranshahr–Zahedan–Milak are four main routes connecting Chabahar to national and international roads.

In July 2016, India began shipping US$150 million worth of rail tracks to Chabahar to build US$1.6 billion Chabahar–Zahedan railway by India's Ircon International, for which India pledged additional US$400 million and Iran has also allocated US$125 million in December 2016, thus taking the total allocation to US$575 million (out of US$1.6 billion needed) till the end of 2016.

=== Port ===
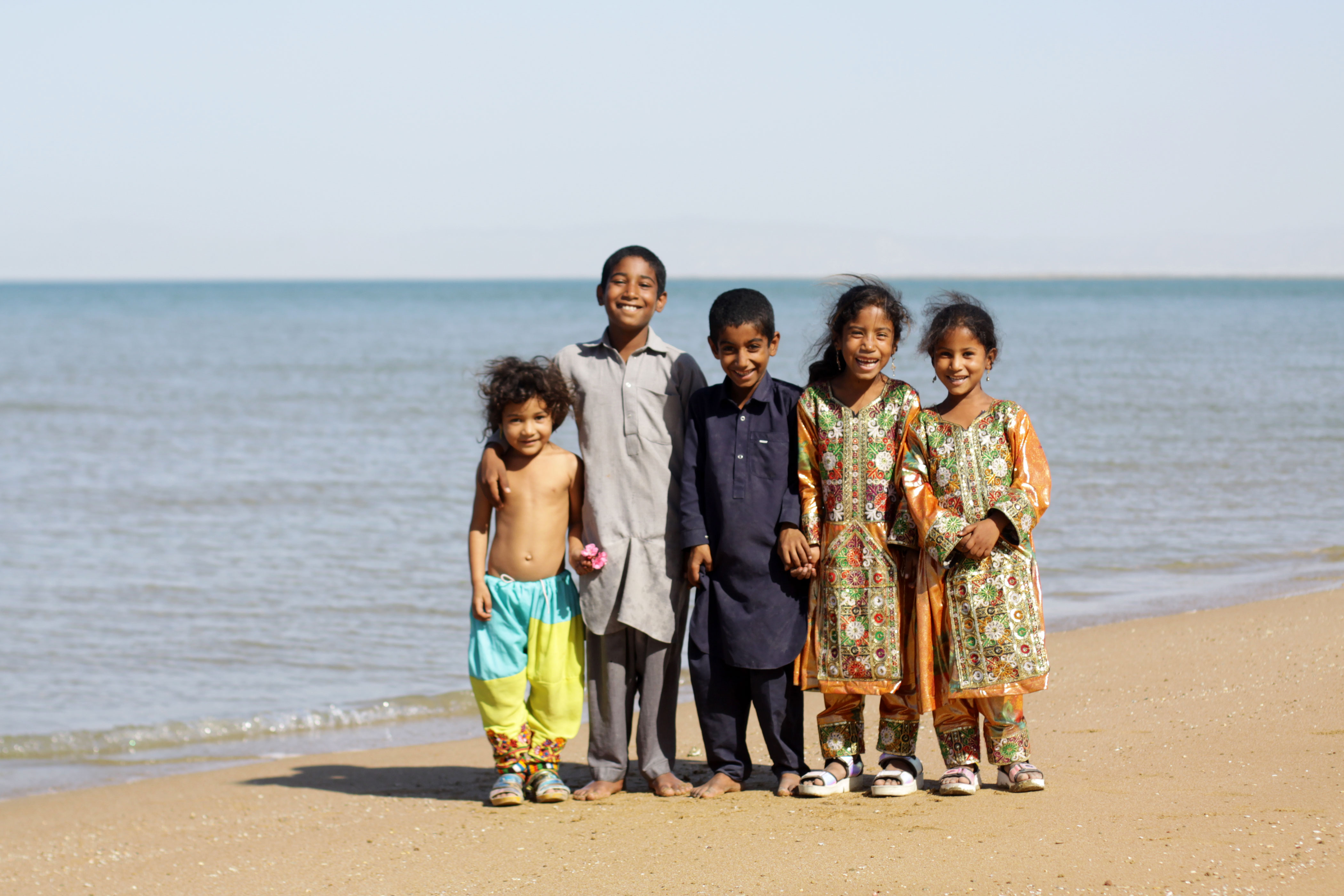
Tis beach and port

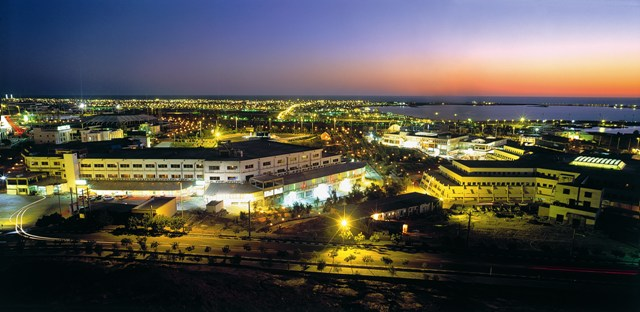
Chabahar Port at night

India is helping develop the Chabahar Port, which will give it access to the oil and gas resources in Iran and the Central Asian states. By doing so, India hopes to compete with the Chinese, who are building Gwadar Port on the other side of the border in Pakistan's Balochistan Province. In 2014, Indian government sanctioned an initial amount US$85 million for the development of Chabahar port. By 2016, as sanctions against Iran were being lifted after the nuclear deal, Indian investment plans had risen to US$500 million.

In turn, Iran will get its first deepwater port, to allow it to conduct global trade with big cargo ships rather than the small ships its ports can currently handle, thus putting an end to its reliance on the United Arab Emirates as a shipping intermediary. On top of that, Chabahar shall be used for transshipment to Central Asia, while keeping the port of Bandar Abbas as a major hub mainly for trade with Russia and Europe.

India and Iran have entered into an agreement to provide preferential treatment and tariff reductions at Chabahar for Indian goods destined for Central Asia.

Interest in Chabahar port's project renewed once US-sponsored economic isolation of Iran was relieved, and benefits from the resurgent Indian economy. Along with Bandar Abbas, Chabahar is the Iranian entrepot on the north–south corridor. A strategic partnership between India, Iran and Russia is intended to establish a multi-modal transport link connecting Mumbai with St. Petersburg, providing Europe and the former Soviet republics of Central Asia access to Asia and vice versa.

India and Iran are discussing building a gas pipeline between the two countries along the bed of the Arabian Sea to bypass Pakistan, using the Chabahar port. Both the countries are pondering the delivery of natural gas produced in Turkmenistan with Indian assistance to north Iran while the Islamic Republic will send natural gas from its southern deposits to Indian consumers. This pipeline is conceived by India to replace the proposed Iran–Pakistan gas pipeline, the negotiations for which have dragged on due to the worsening of relations between India and Pakistan.

== Geography ==
=== Location ===
The city is on the Makran Coast of the Iranian province of Sistan and Baluchestan, and is officially designated as a "Free Trade and Industrial Zone" by the Iranian government. Due to its free-trade zone status, the city has increased in significance in international trade.

=== Climate ===
The county of Chabahar has hot, humid weather in the summer and warm weather in the winter, giving it a hot desert climate (Köppen climate classification BWh). The western winds in the winter bring about scattered rainfalls in this region, and very occasionally winds from the Indian monsoon affect the region, as in July 1976 when 46.6 millimetres (1.8 in) fell. In most years around 100 millimetres (3.9 in) will fall; however a positive Indian Ocean Dipole in 1997/1998 led to a record total of 470 millimetres (18.5 in); in contrast between July 2000 and June 2002 only 57.5 millimetres (2.3 in) fell in two years. The summer monsoon winds from the Indian subcontinent make Chabahar the coolest southern port in the summer and the warmest port of Iran in the winter. It has an average maximum temperature of 34 °C and an average minimum temperature of 21.5 °C. It has the same latitude as Miami in Florida, United States, and temperatures are very similar to those in Miami.

Climate data for Chabahar (1991–2020, extremes 1963–2020)
Month	Jan	Feb	Mar	Apr	May	Jun	Jul	Aug	Sep	Oct	Nov	Dec	Year
Record high °C (°F)	33.2 (91.8)	33.0 (91.4)	38.0 (100.4)	42.0 (107.6)	46.0 (114.8)	45.2 (113.4)	47.0 (116.6)	42.4 (108.3)	42.0 (107.6)	41.4 (106.5)	37.0 (98.6)	32.0 (89.6)	47.0 (116.6)
Mean daily maximum °C (°F)	24.3 (75.7)	25.1 (77.2)	27.1 (80.8)	30.3 (86.5)	33.0 (91.4)	33.7 (92.7)	32.5 (90.5)	31.3 (88.3)	31.3 (88.3)	31.4 (88.5)	29.2 (84.6)	26.2 (79.2)	29.6 (85.3)
Daily mean °C (°F)	20.7 (69.3)	21.8 (71.2)	23.9 (75.0)	27.1 (80.8)	30.1 (86.2)	31.2 (88.2)	30.3 (86.5)	29.1 (84.4)	28.7 (83.7)	27.9 (82.2)	25.2 (77.4)	22.3 (72.1)	26.5 (79.8)
Mean daily minimum °C (°F)	16.6 (61.9)	17.9 (64.2)	20.5 (68.9)	24.0 (75.2)	27.2 (81.0)	29.0 (84.2)	28.7 (83.7)	27.6 (81.7)	26.6 (79.9)	24.4 (75.9)	20.9 (69.6)	17.9 (64.2)	23.4 (74.2)
Record low °C (°F)	7.0 (44.6)	7.0 (44.6)	9.6 (49.3)	14.0 (57.2)	16.0 (60.8)	22.0 (71.6)	21.0 (69.8)	19.0 (66.2)	19.0 (66.2)	13.2 (55.8)	9.0 (48.2)	7.0 (44.6)	7.0 (44.6)
Average precipitation mm (inches)	35.1 (1.38)	7.3 (0.29)	18.1 (0.71)	2.1 (0.08)	0.0 (0.0)	9.0 (0.35)	3.9 (0.15)	1.0 (0.04)	0.1 (0.00)	5.7 (0.22)	9.6 (0.38)	23.7 (0.93)	115.6 (4.53)
Average precipitation days (≥ 1.0 mm)	2.4	1.0	1.6	0.3	0.0	0.2	0.3	0.2	0.0	0.2	0.6	1.4	8.2
Average relative humidity (%)	62	68	74	76	78	81	81	82	81	77	66	61	73.9
Mean monthly sunshine hours	248	233	245	271	300	250	188	209	243	277	266	258	2,988
Source: NOAA NCEI, (extrems before 1991)

== Tourism ==
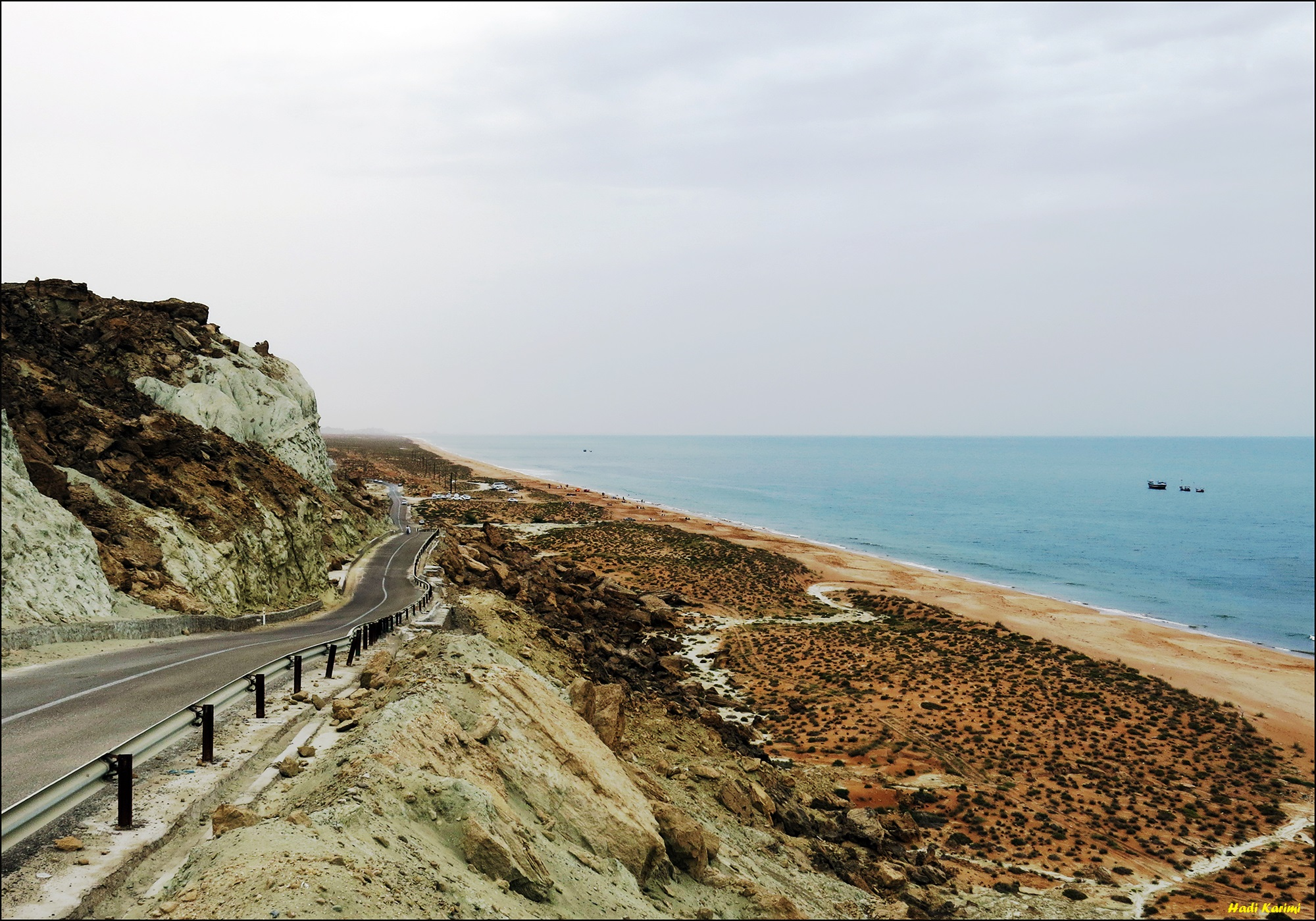
Along the shore sea

A $500 million resort is planned to be built in Chabahar.

== Gallery ==
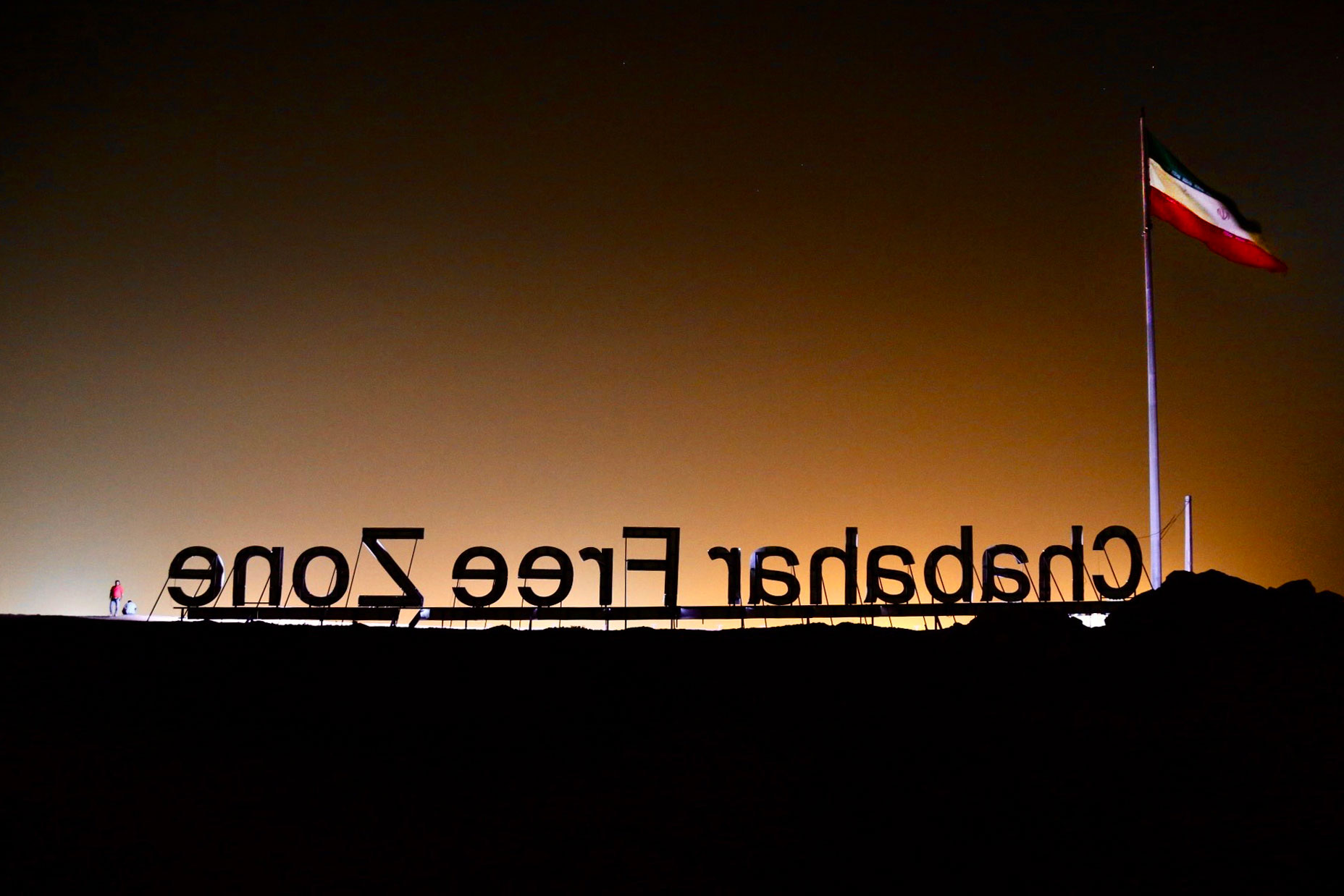
Chabahar Free Zone, Iran

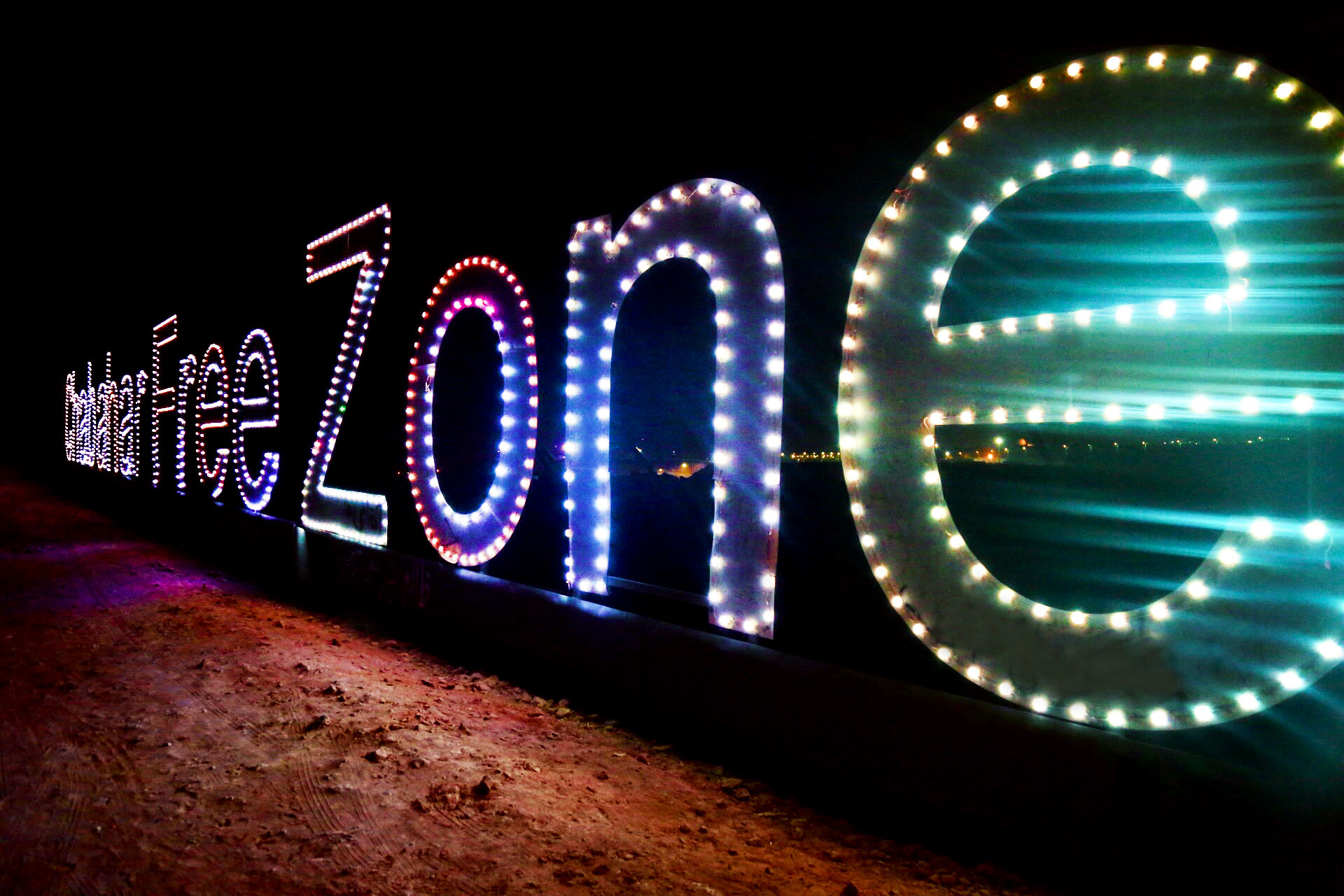
Chabahar Free Zone, Iran

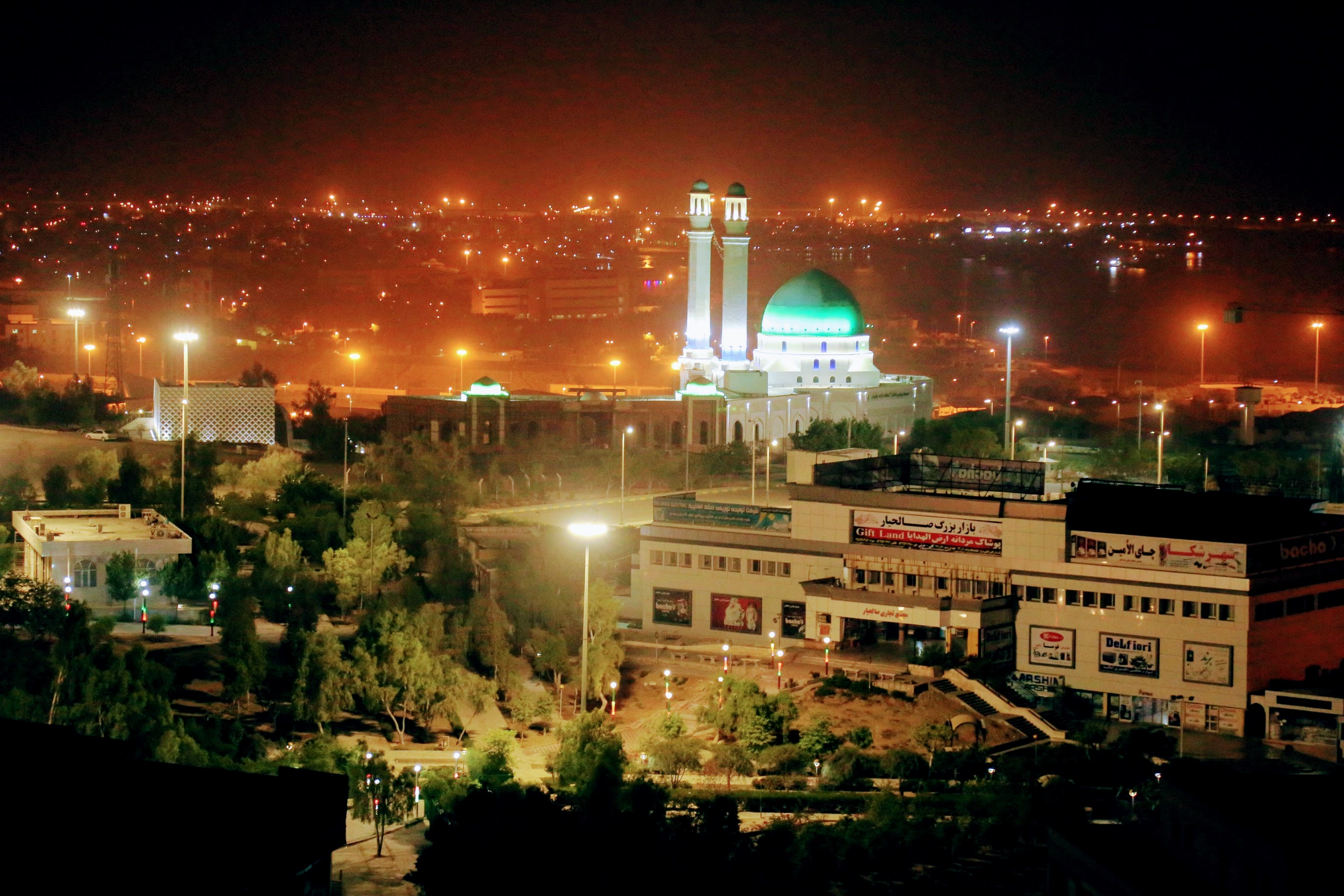
Chabahar Free Zone, Iran

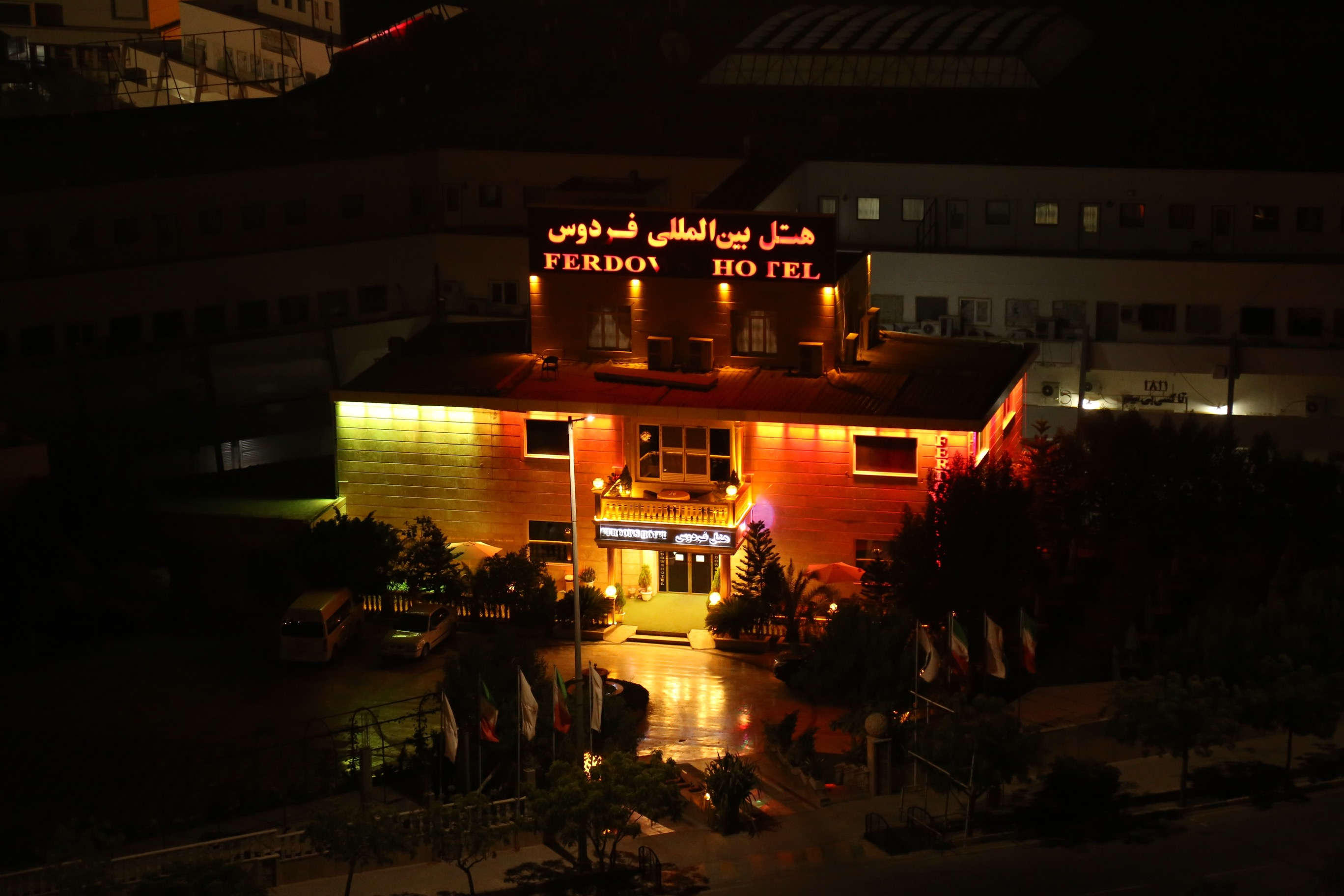
Ferdows Hotel, Chabahar Free Zone, Iran

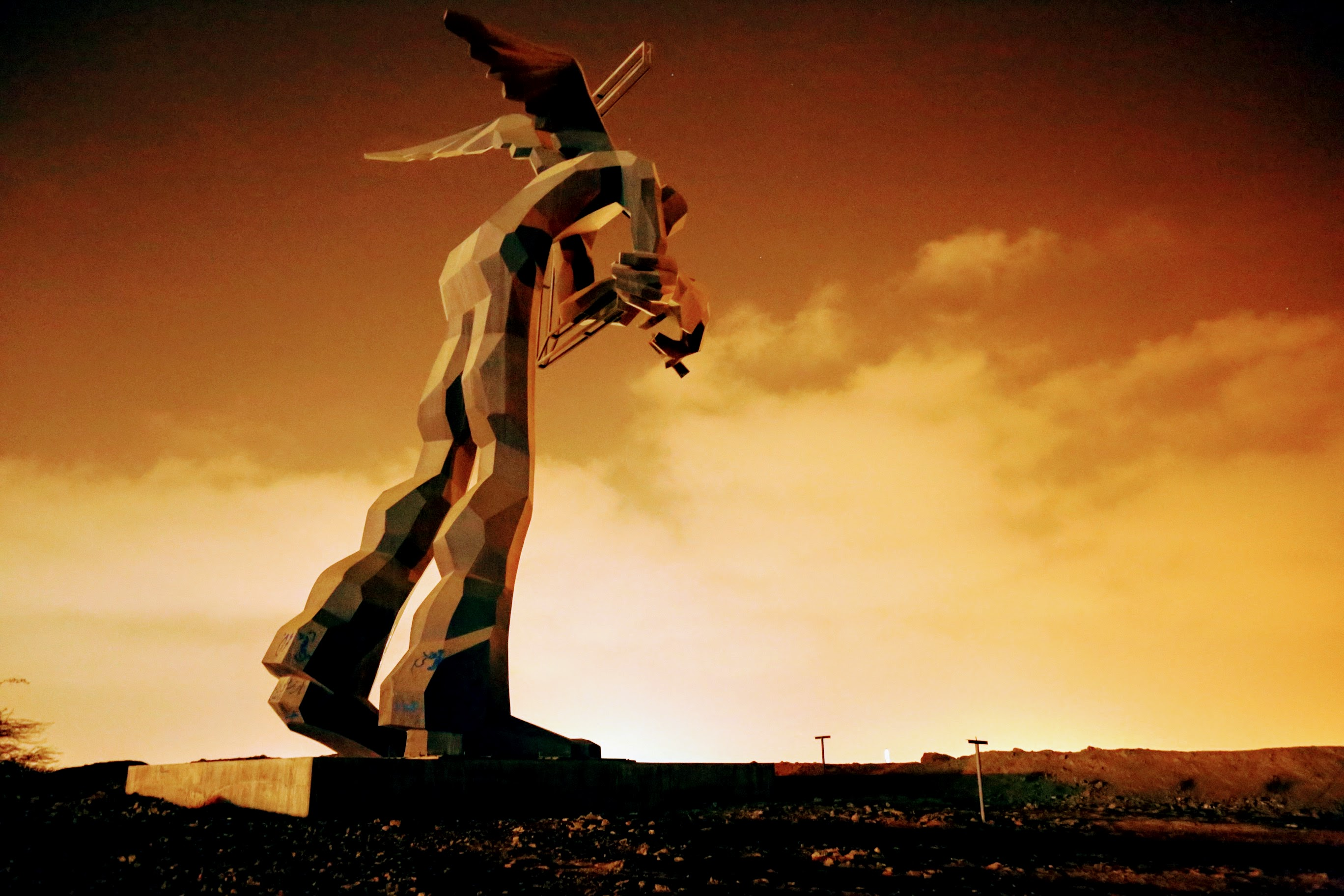
The statue of Chabahar Free Zone, Iran

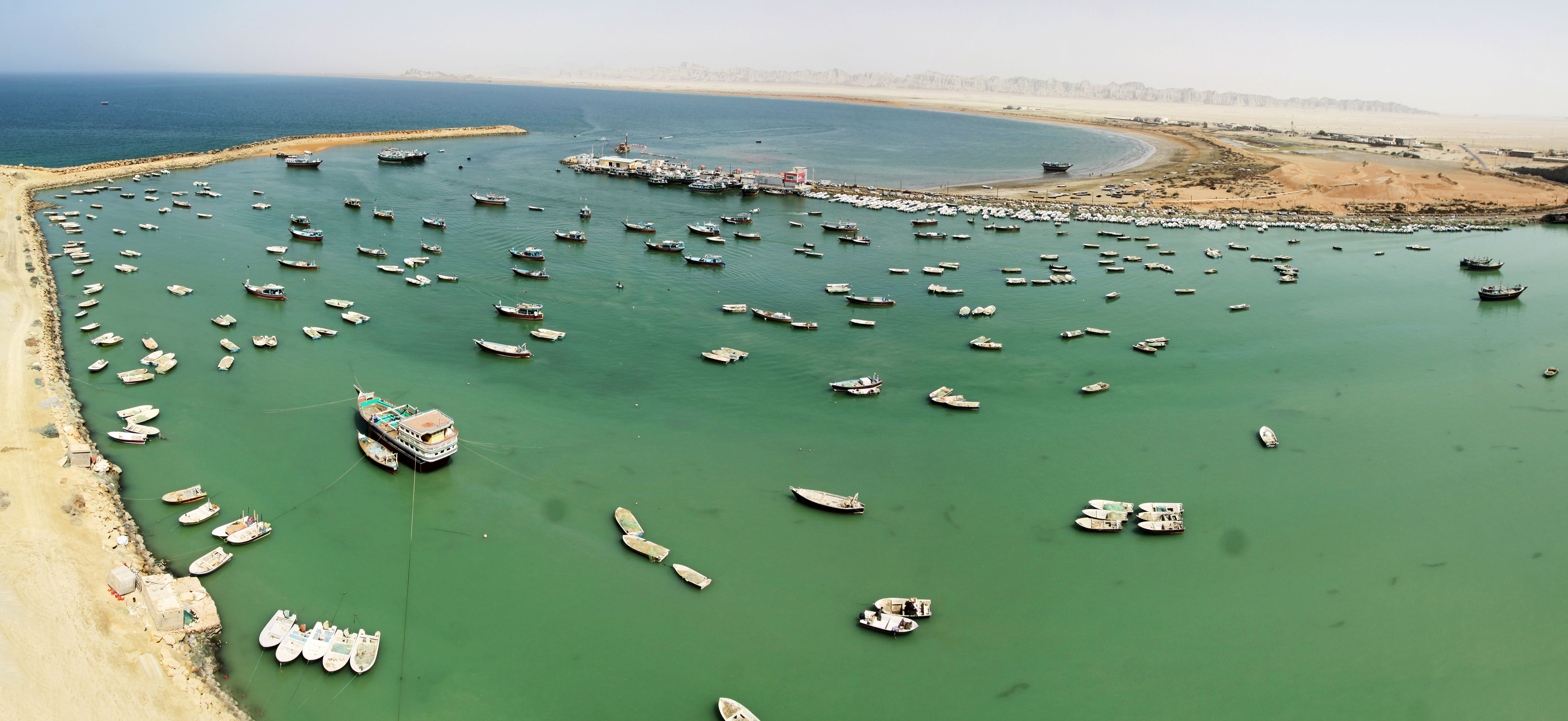
Beris port, Chabahar Free Zone, Iran

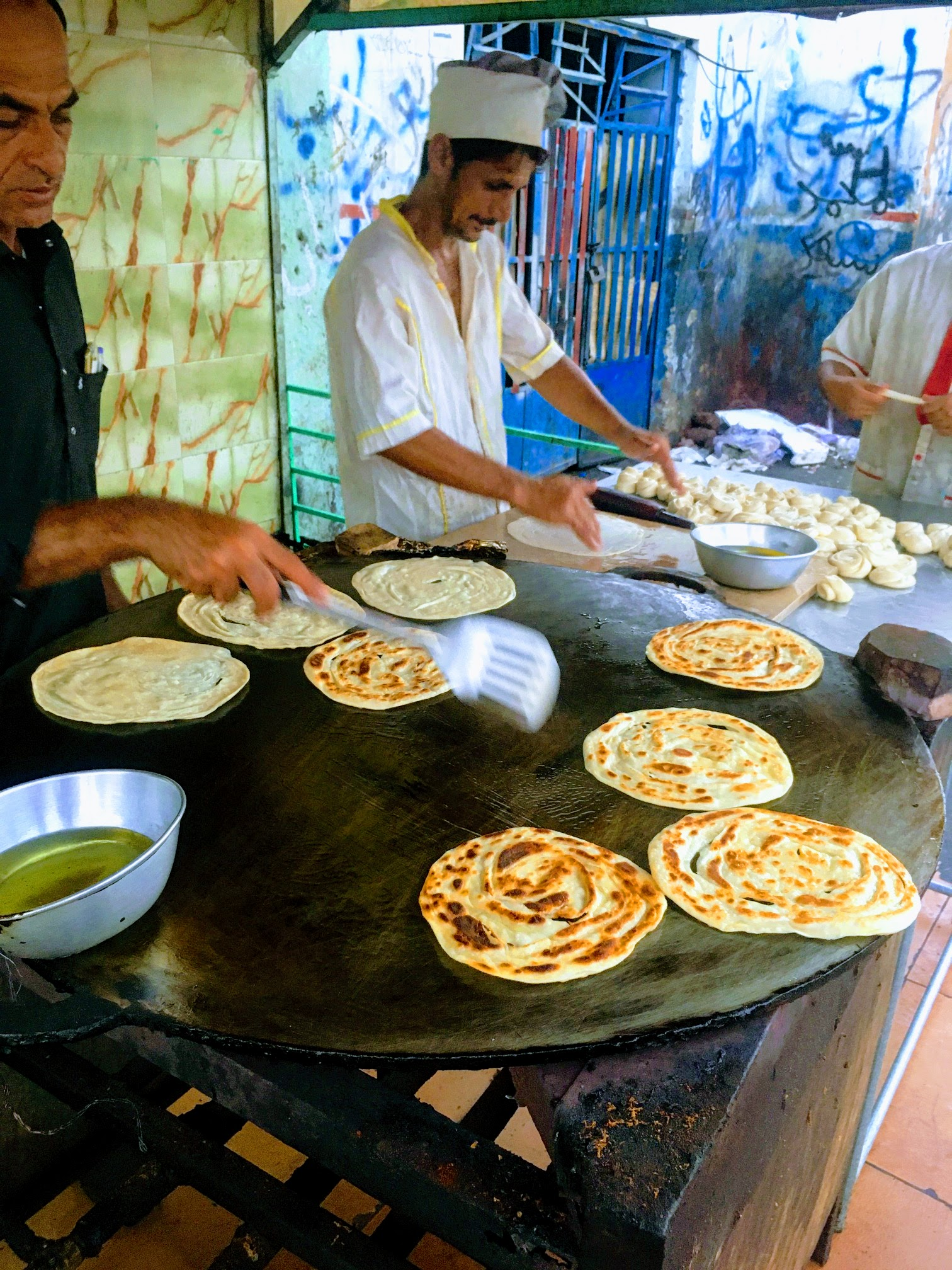

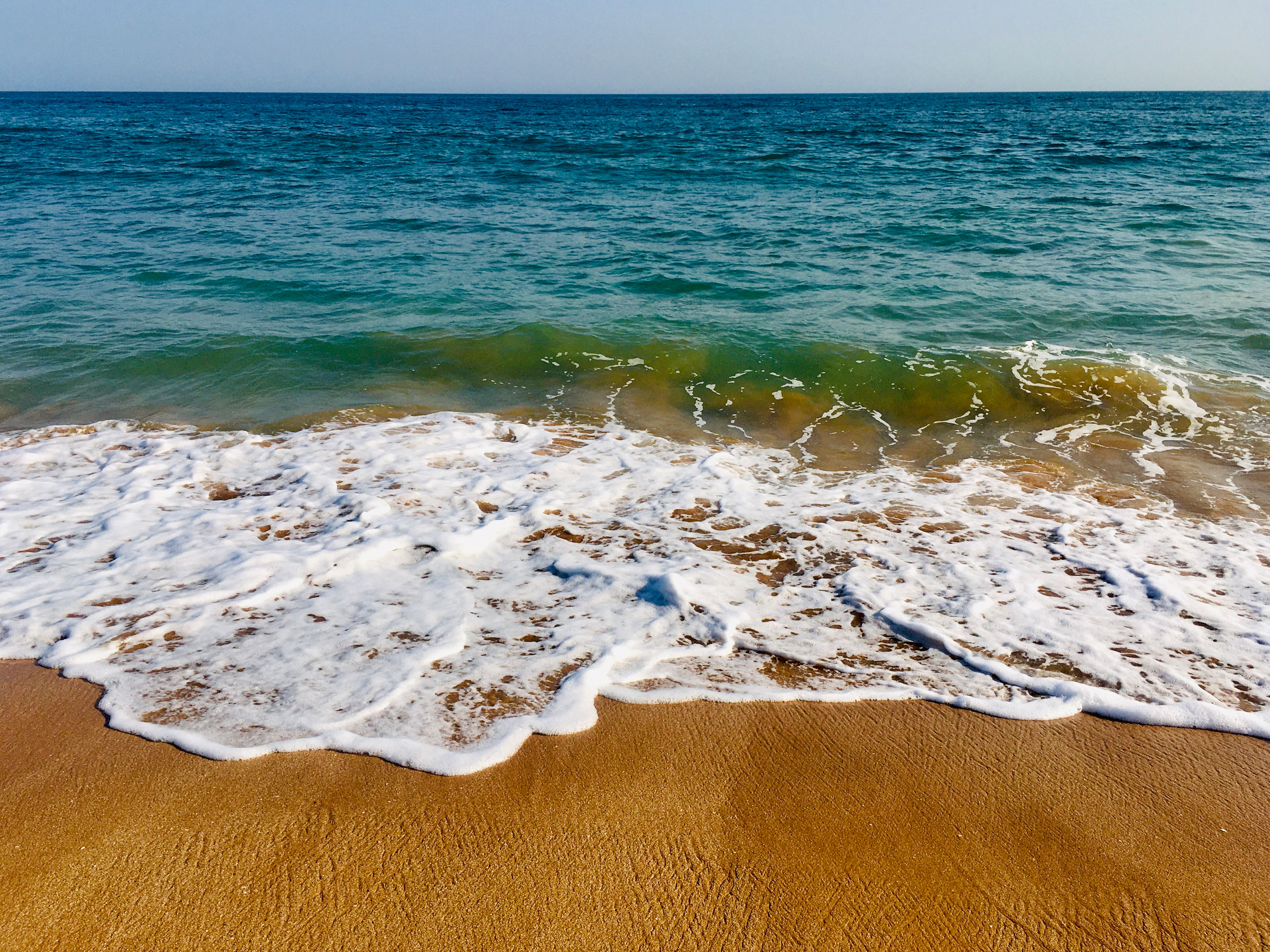

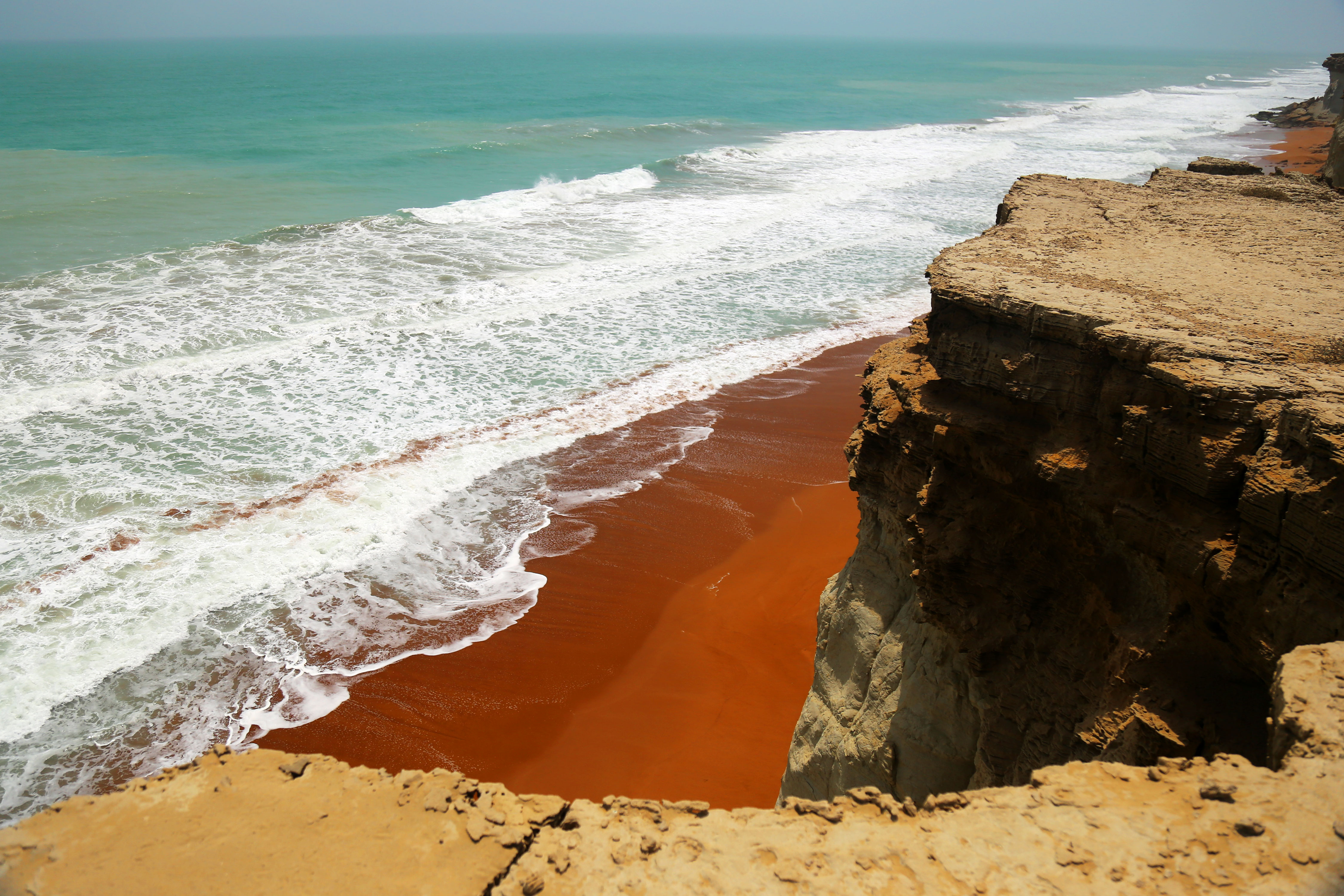
Elevated cliff beaches in suburbs of Chabahar Free Zone, Iran

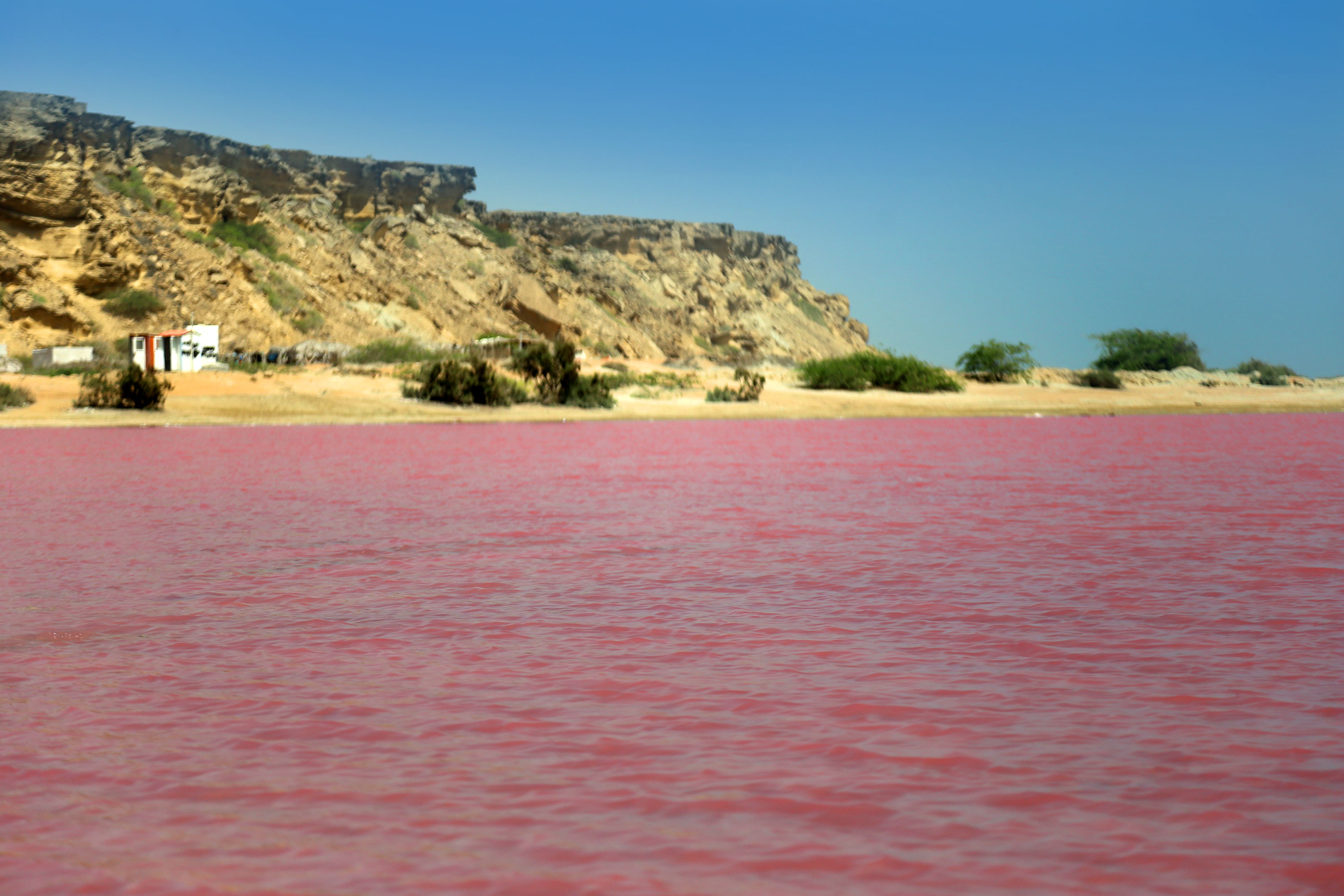
The Lipar Pink Wetland, Chabahar Free Zone, Iran

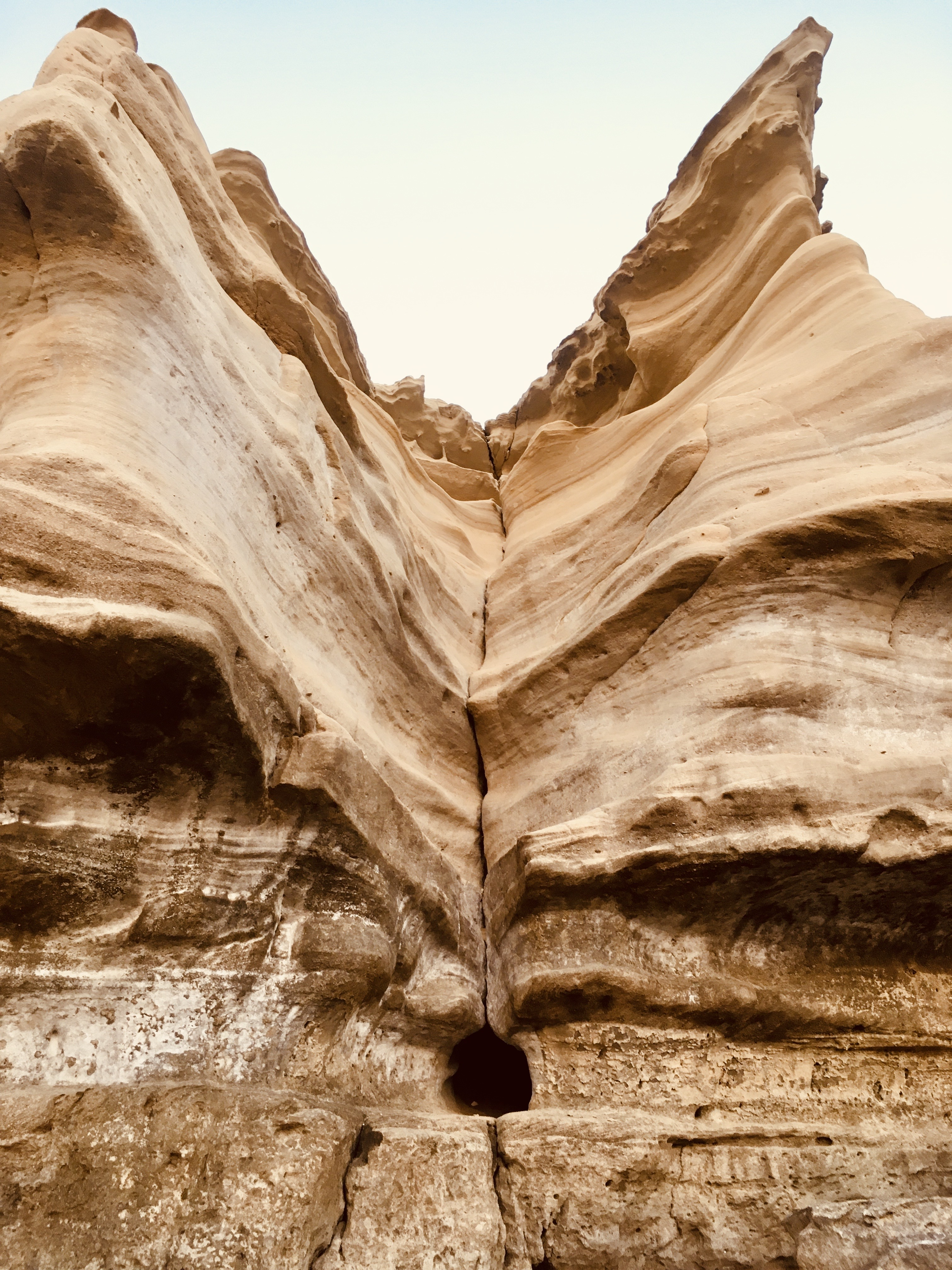
Pozm Beach, Chabahar Free Zone, Iran

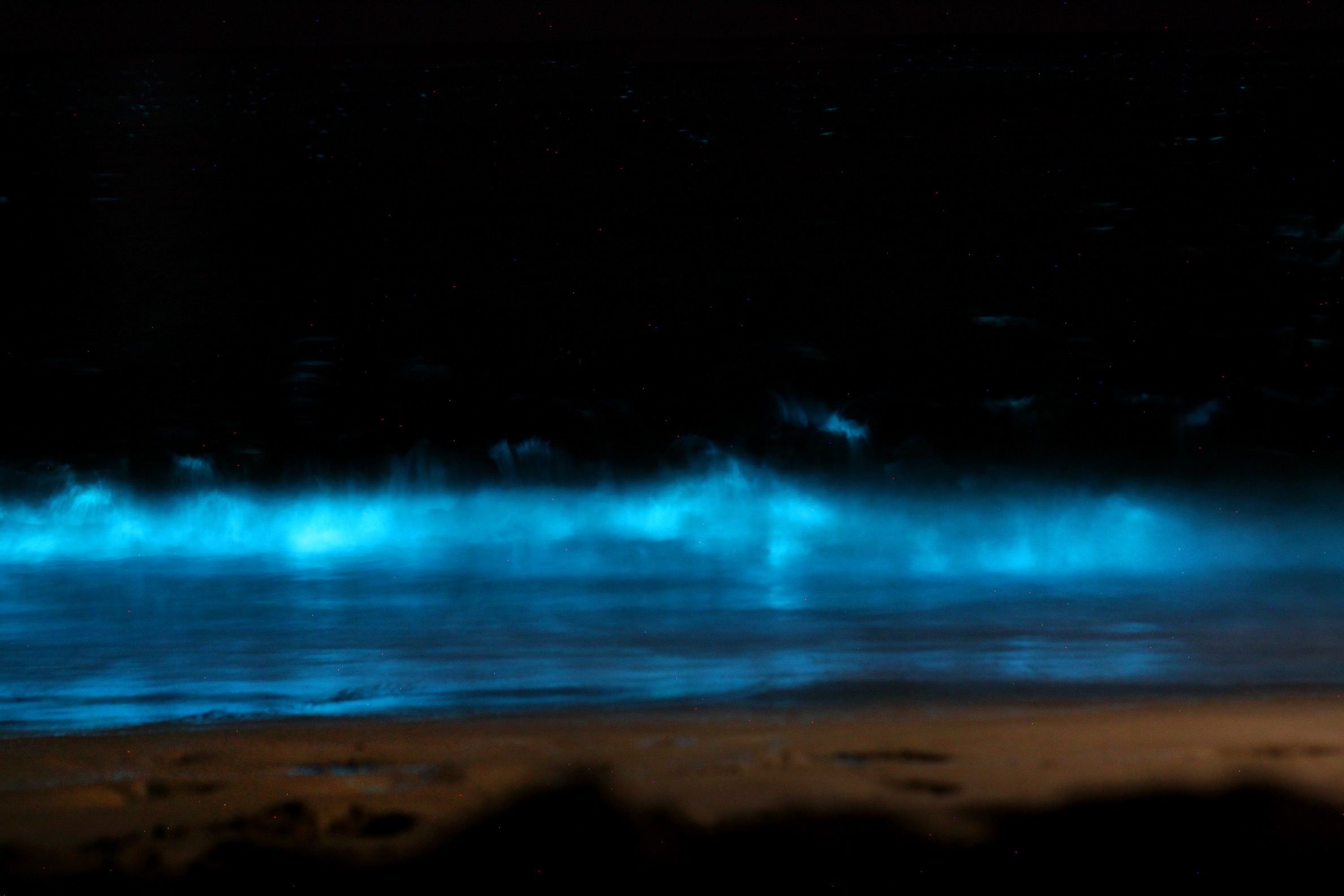
Planktons, Chabahar Free Zone, Iran

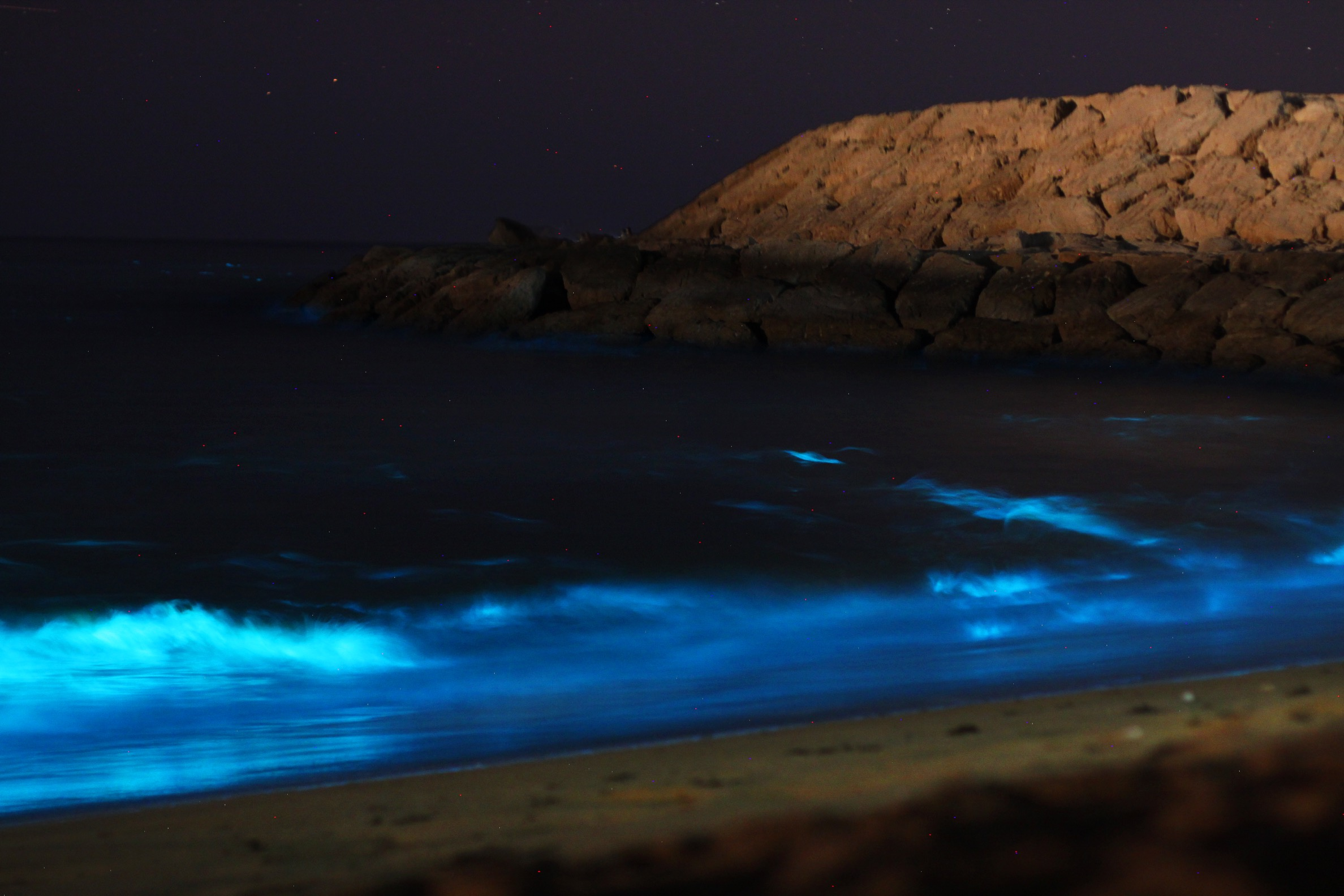
Planktons, Chabahar Free Zone, Iran

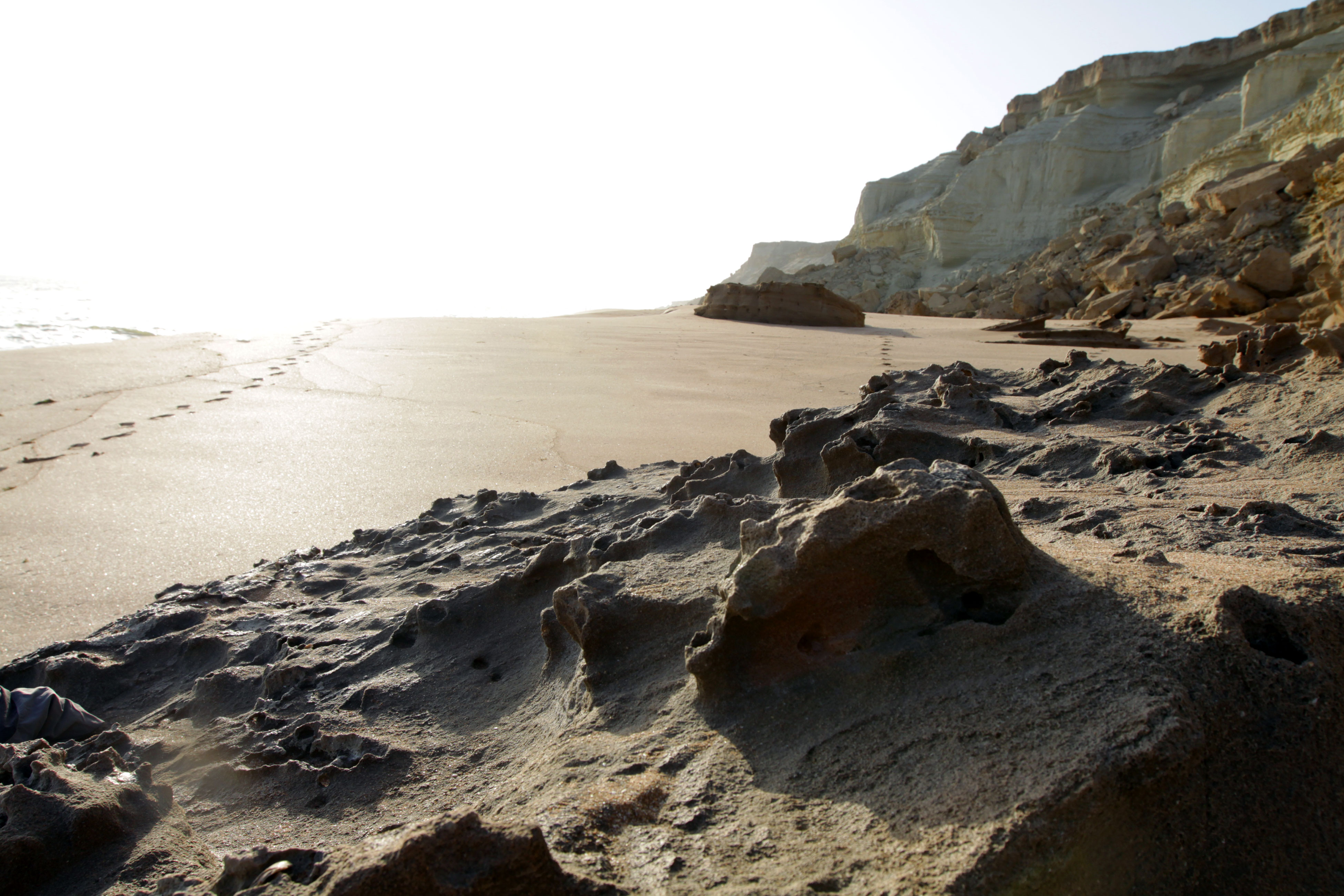
Comb beach, Chabahar Free Zone, Iran

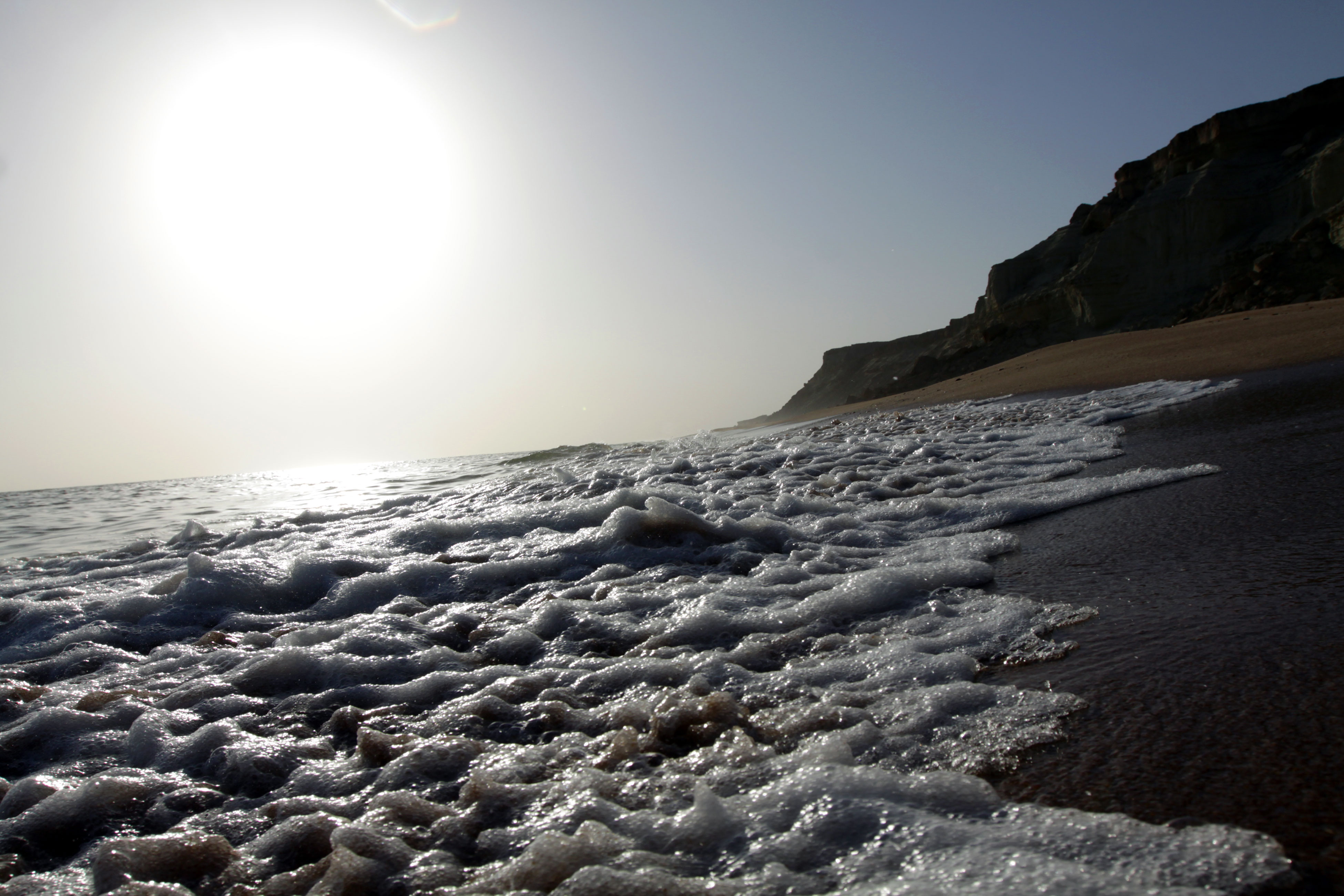
Comb beach, Chabahar Free Zone, Iran

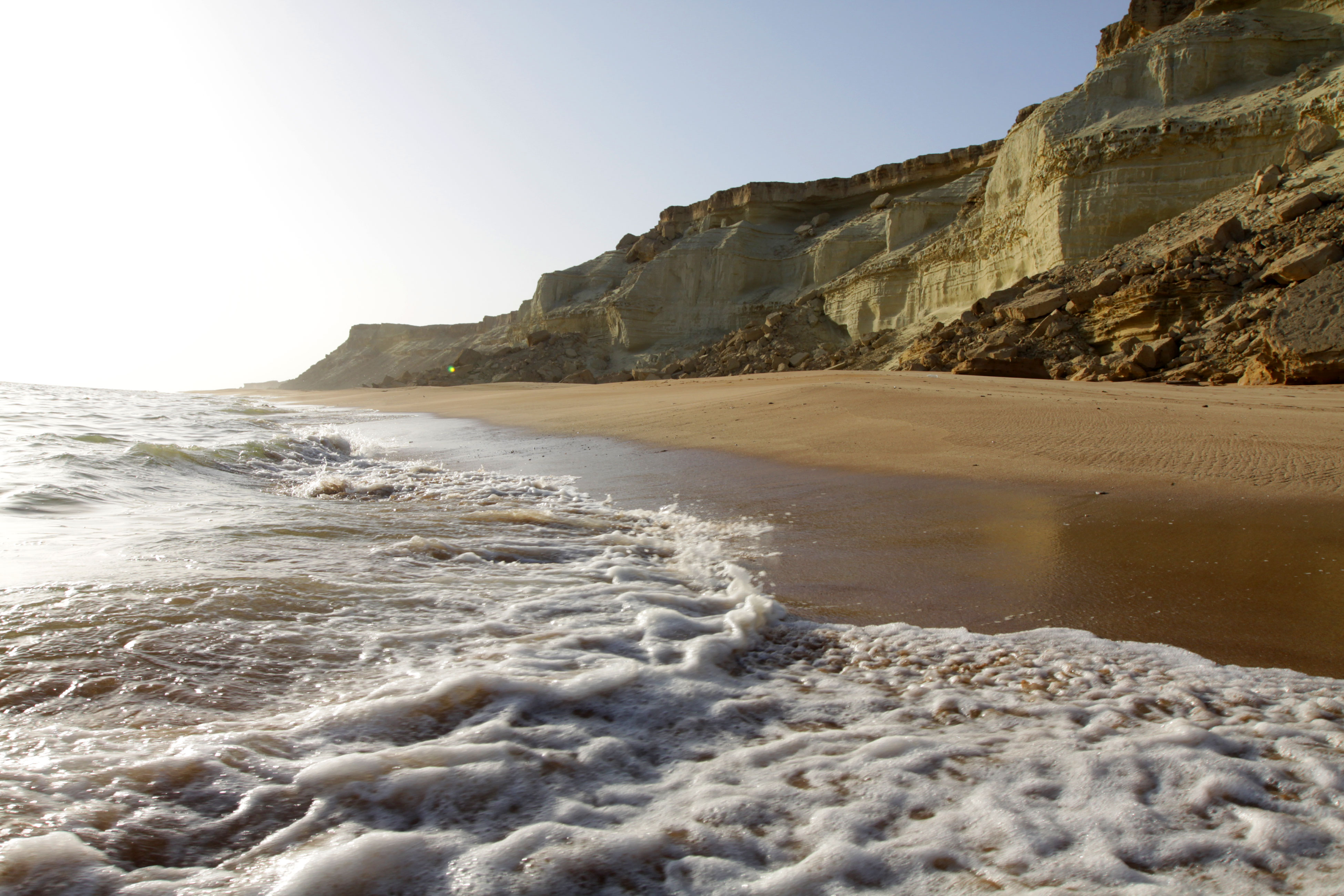
Sany beaches of Chabahar Free Zone, Iran

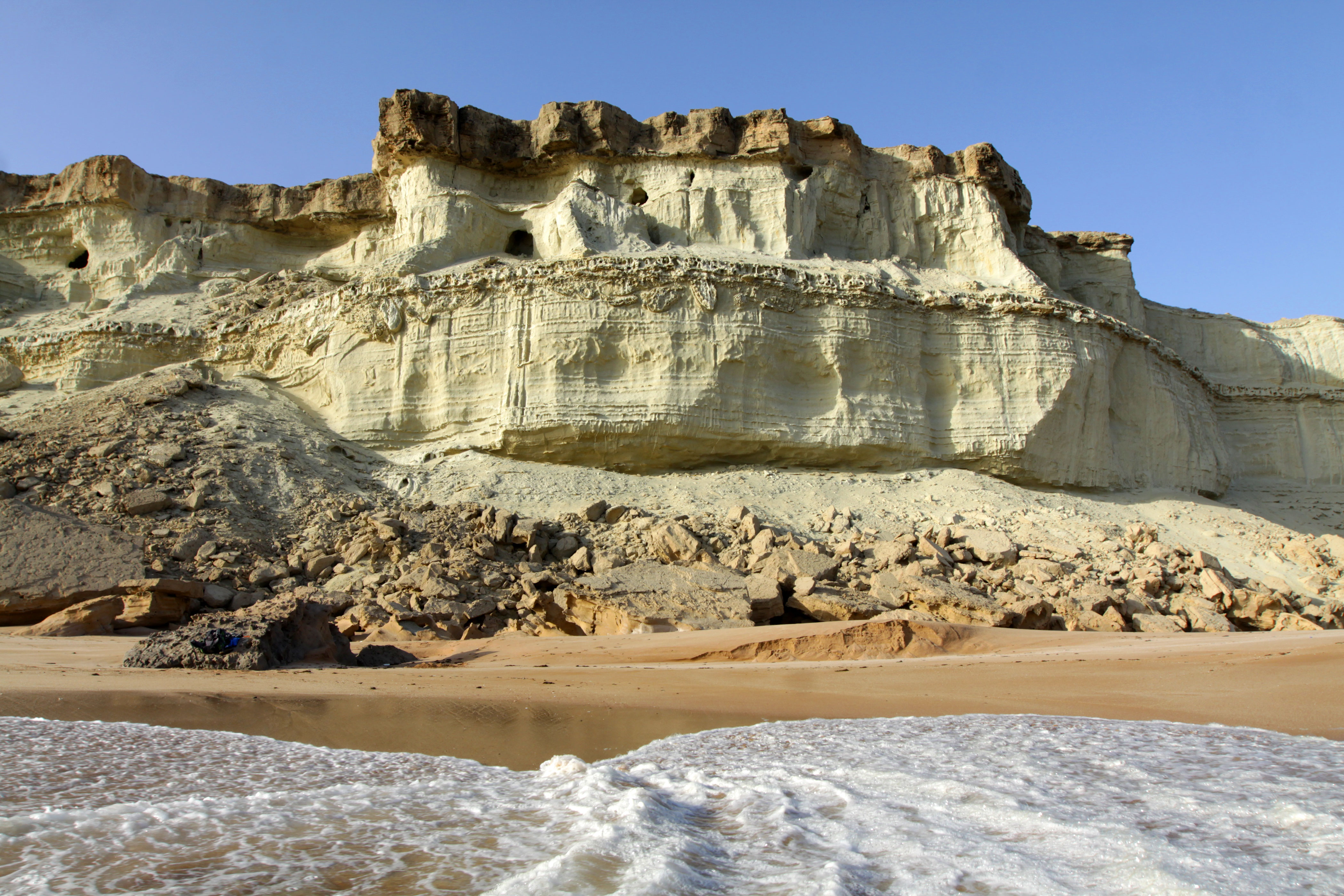
Elevated cliff beaches of Chabahar Free Zone, Iran

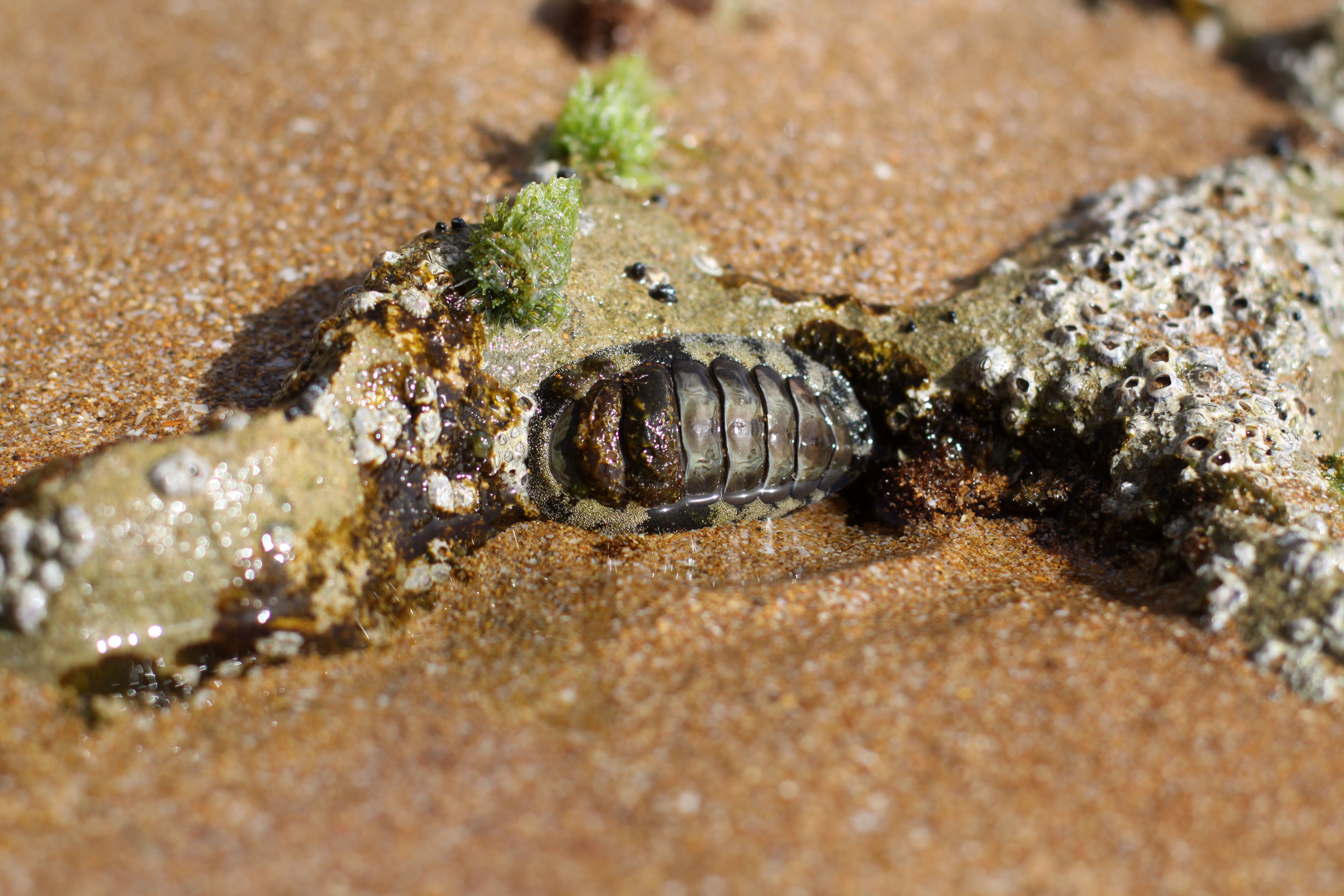
Marine Chiton, Chabahar Free Zone, Iran

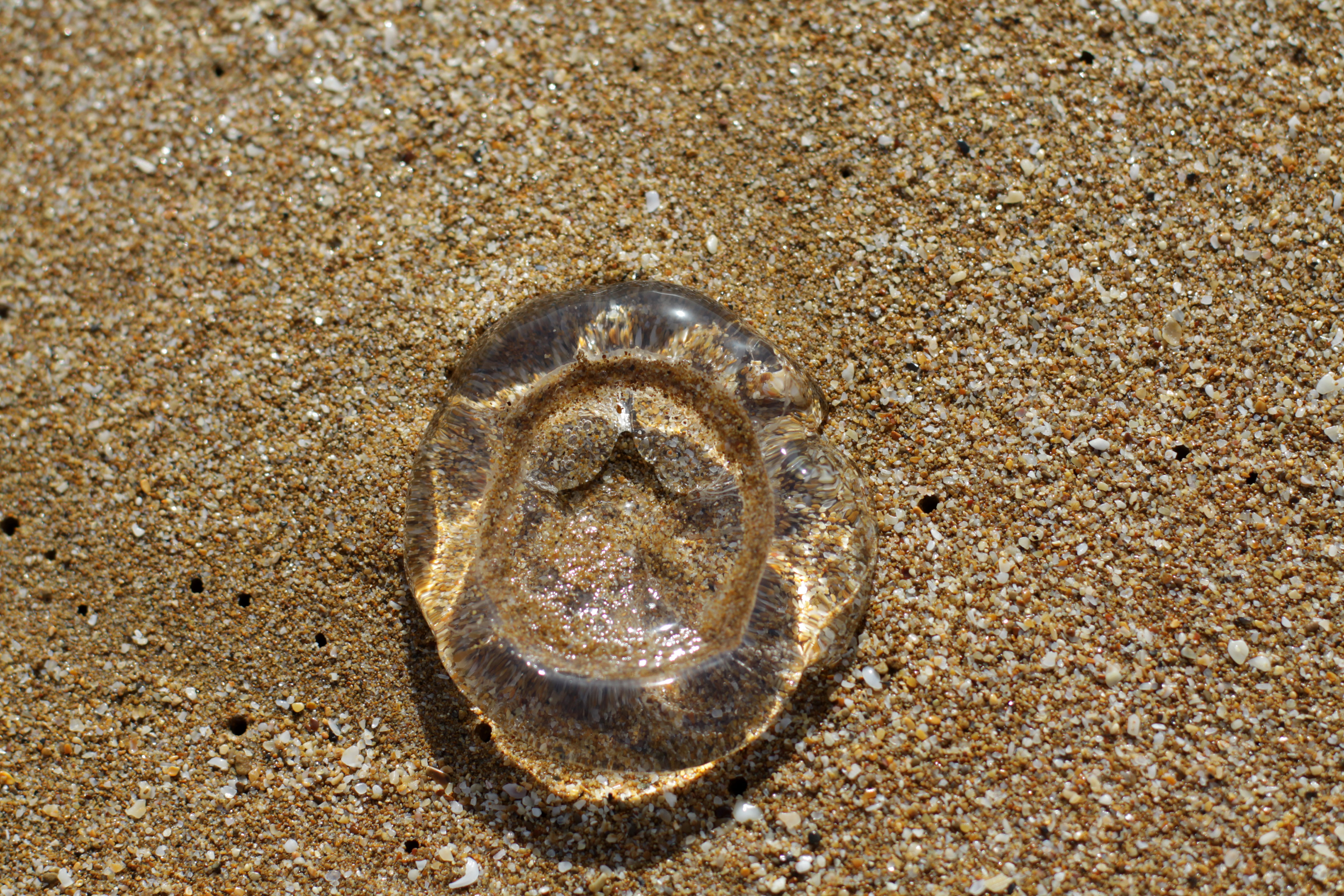
Jelly fishes, Chabahar Free Zone, Iran

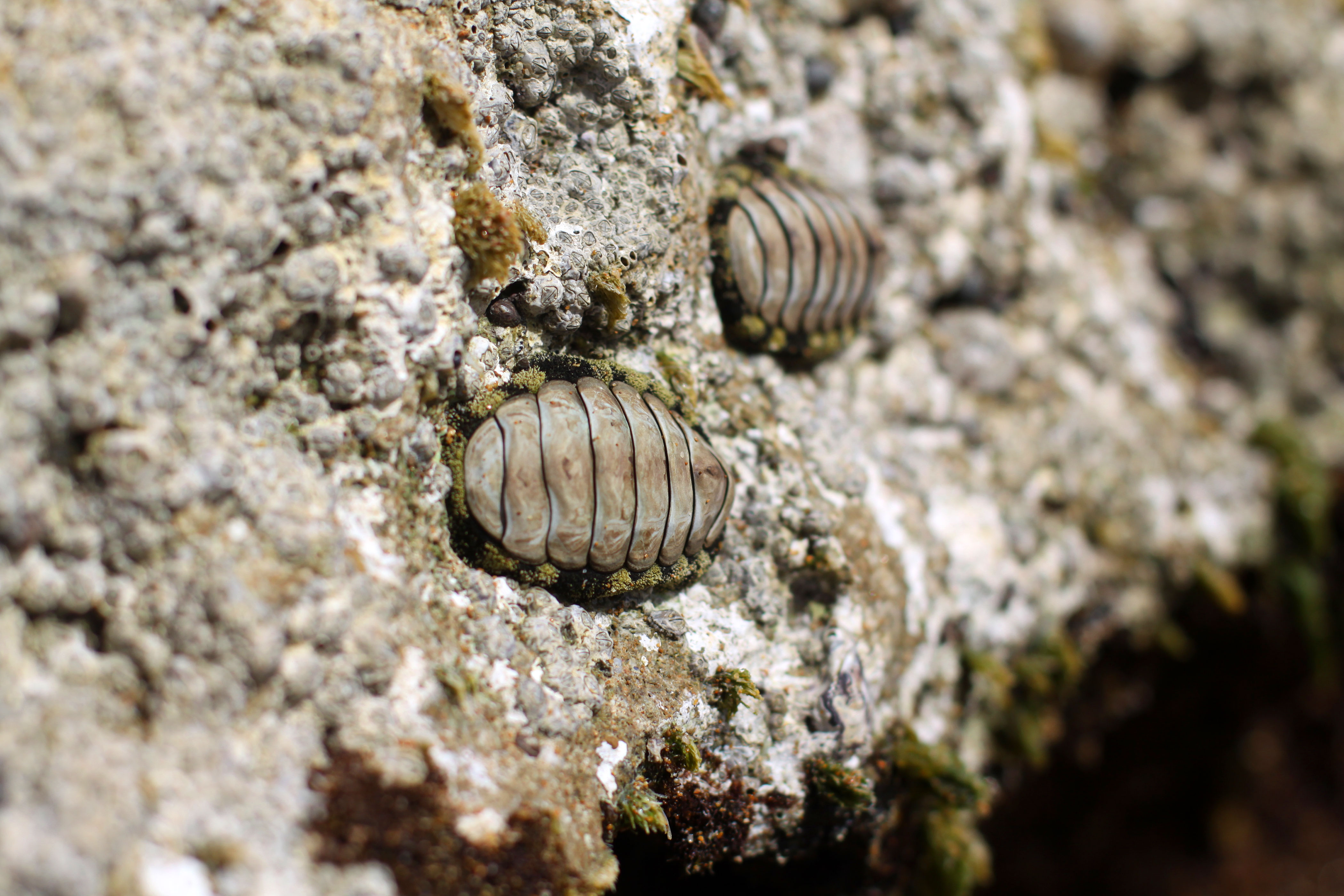
Marine chitons, Chabahar Free Zone, Iran

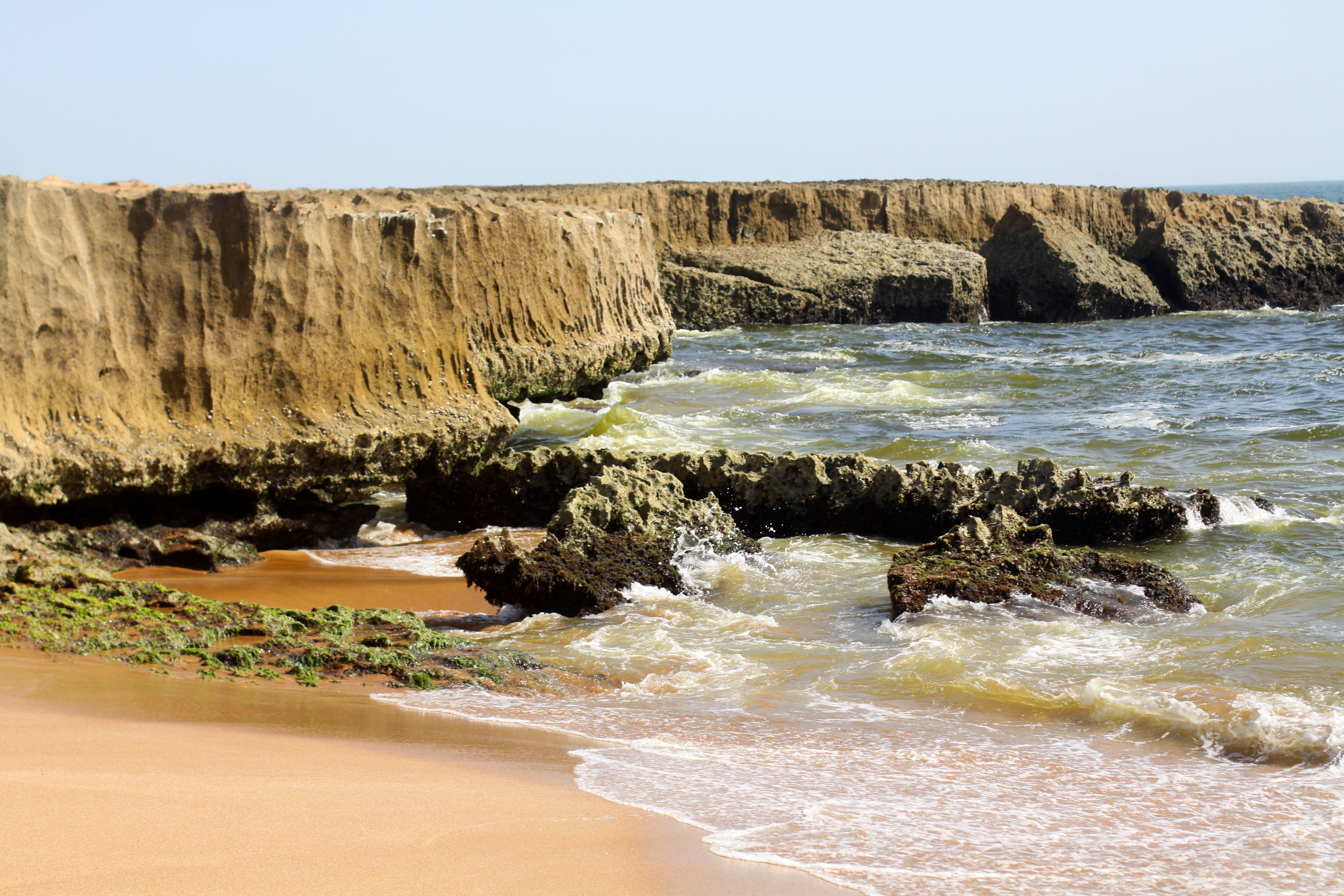
Rocky Beach, Chabahar Free Zone, Iran

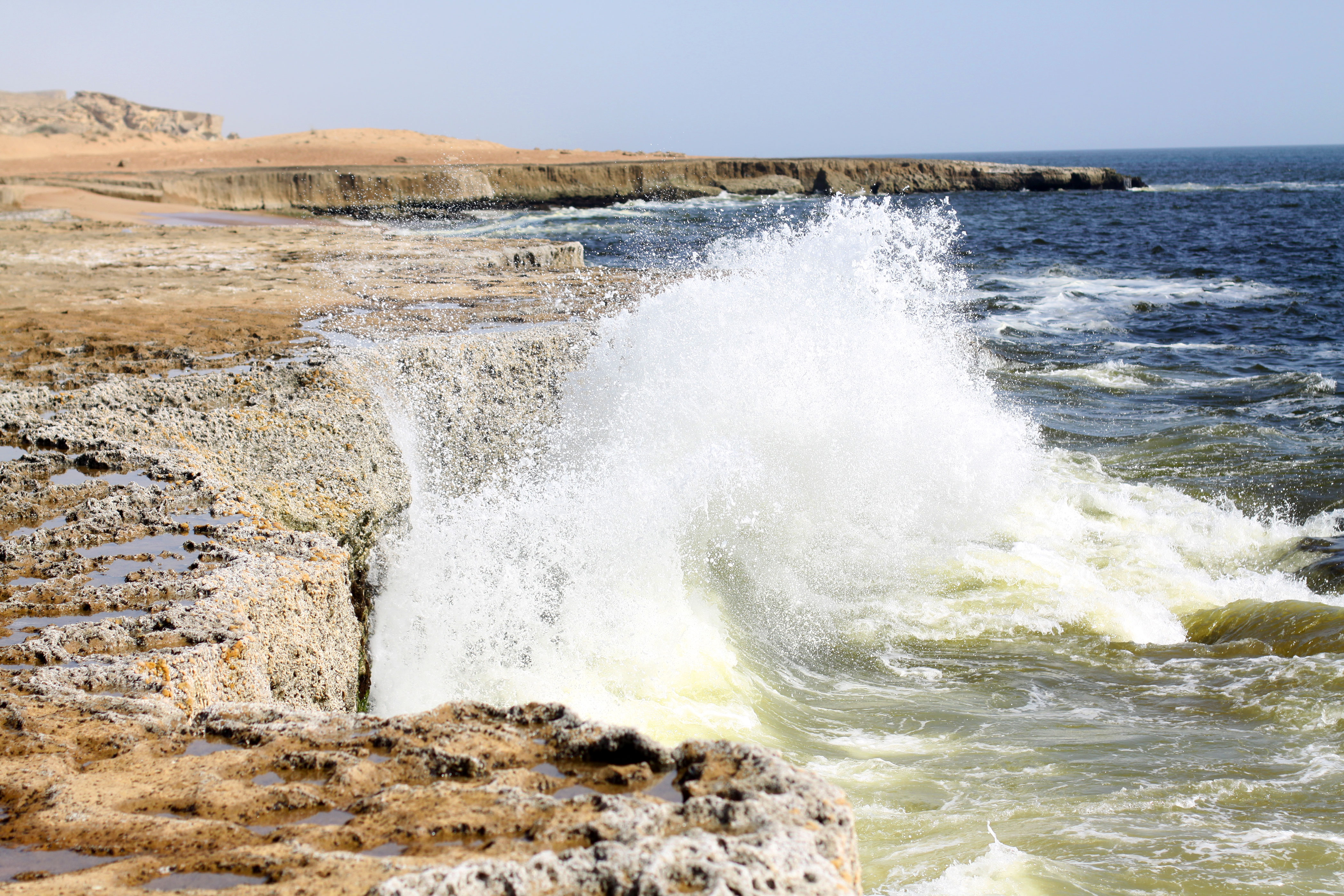
Rocky Beach, Chabahar Free Zone, Iran

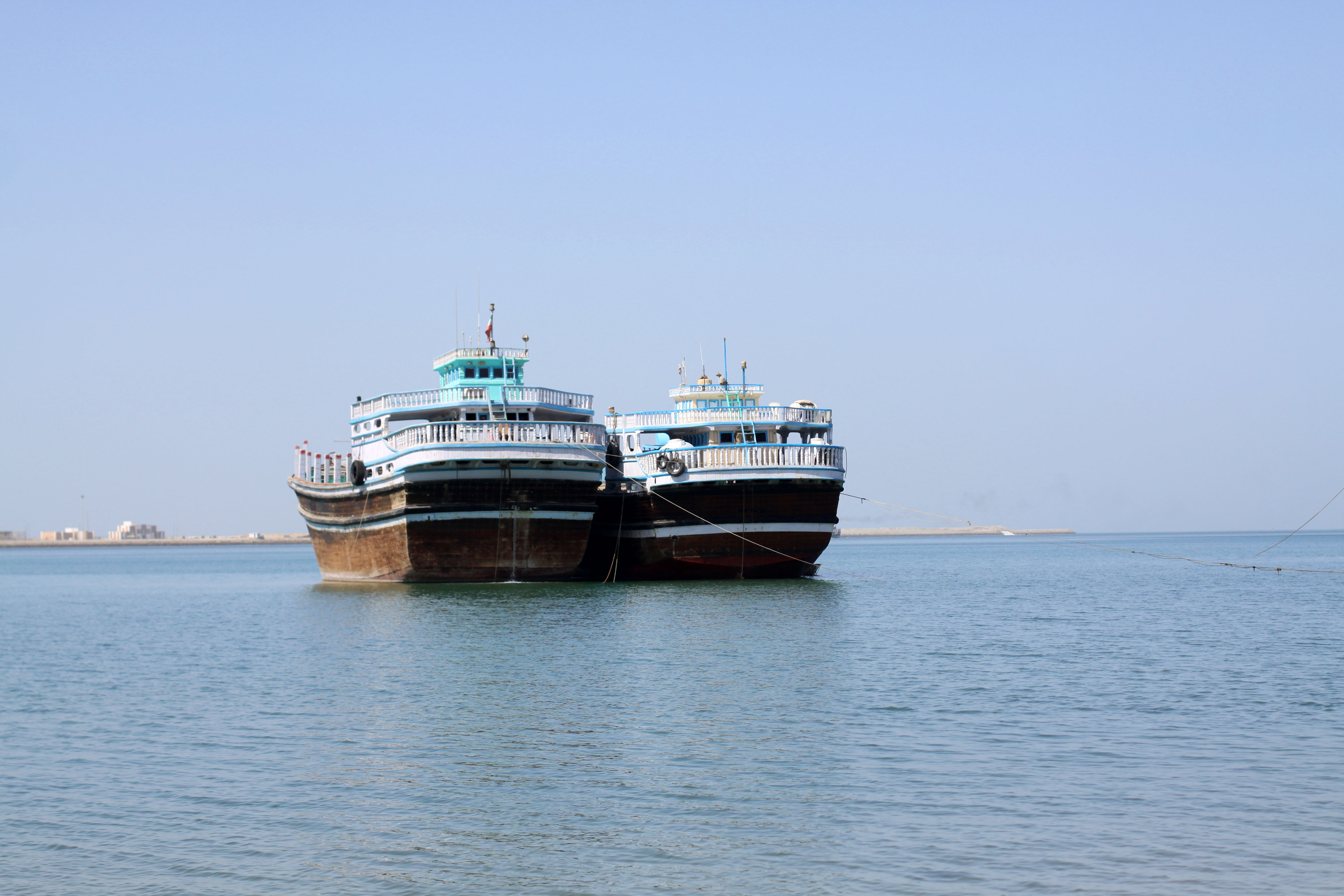
Darya Koochak, Chabahar Free Zone, Iran

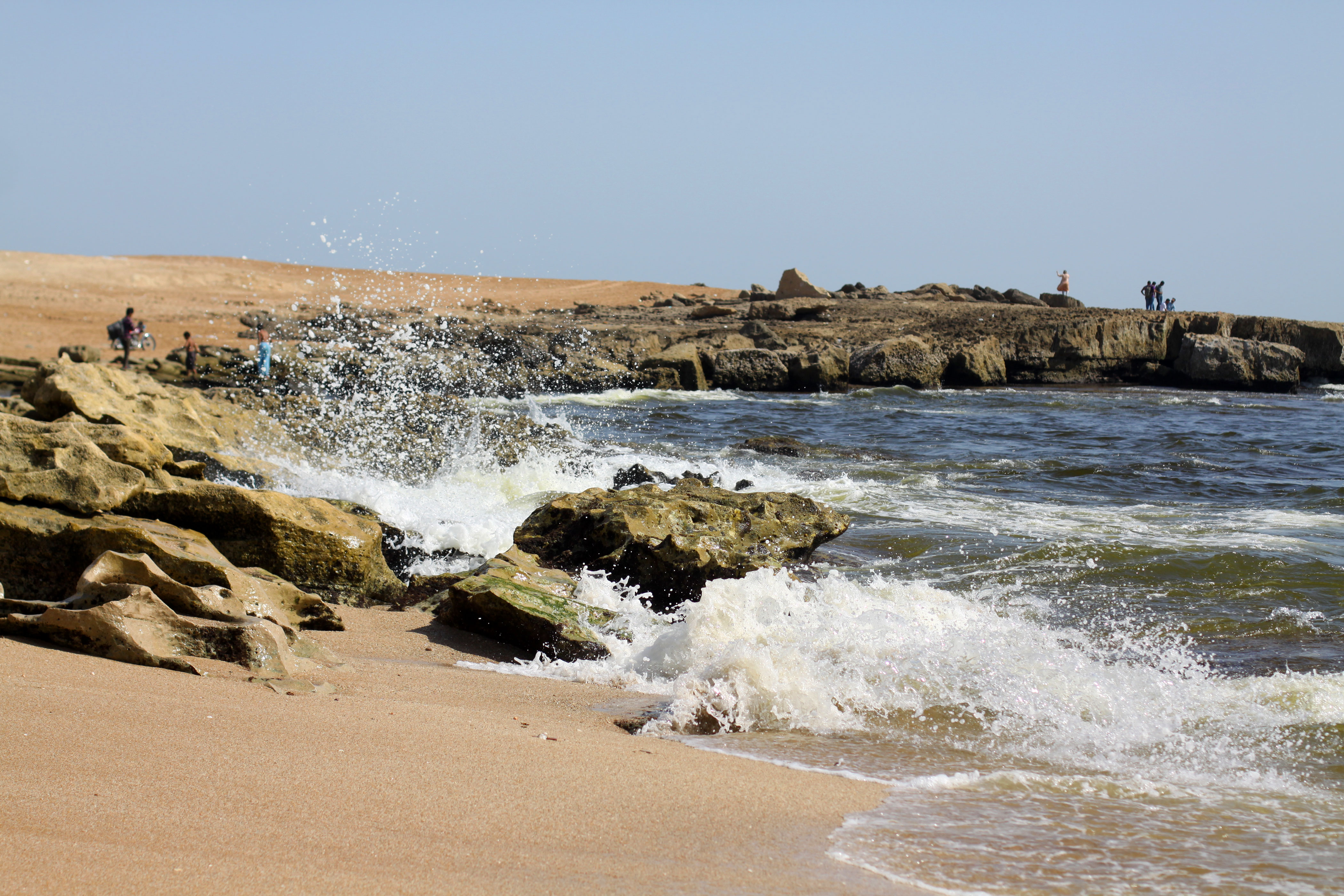
Rocky Beach, Chabahar Free Zone, Iran

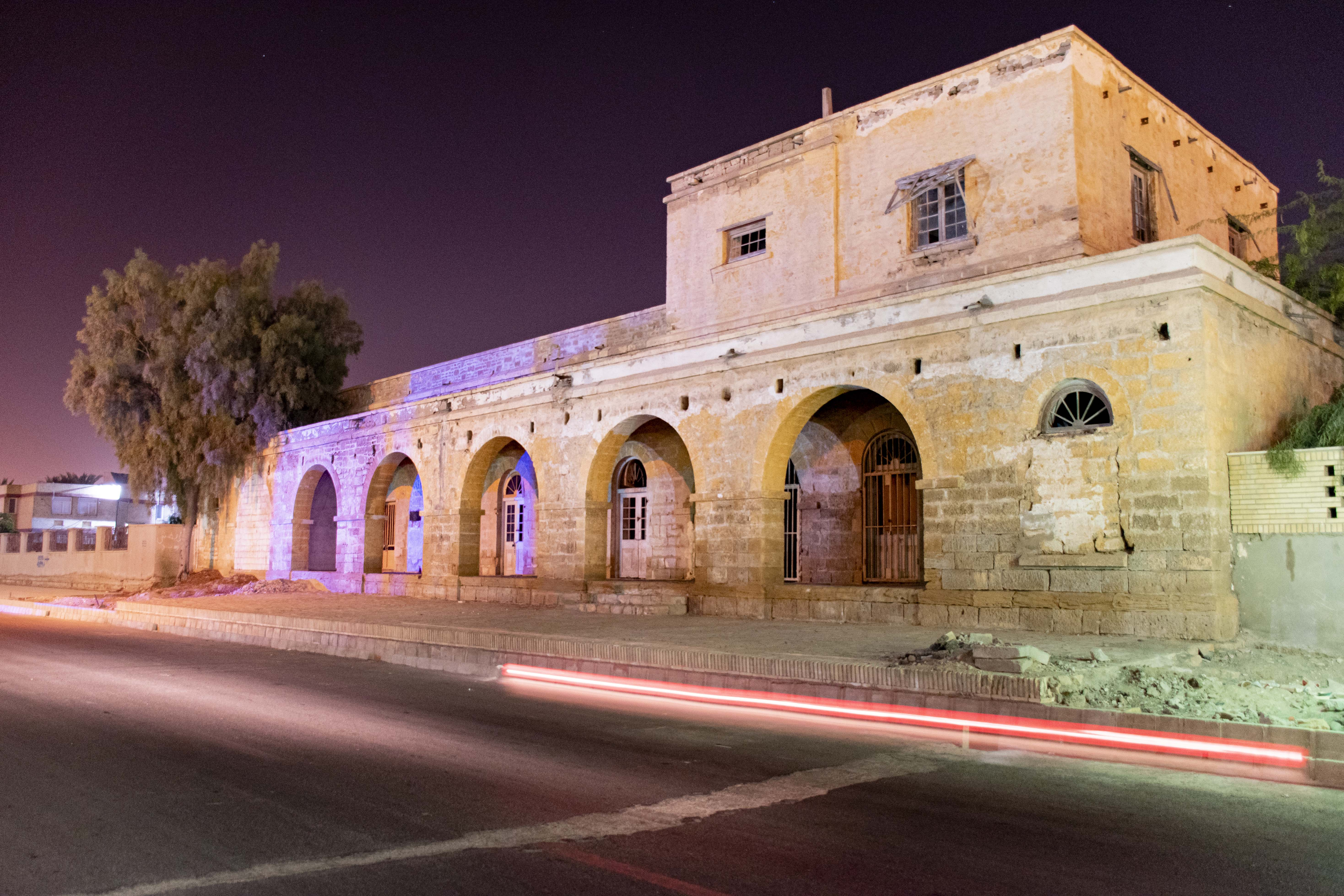

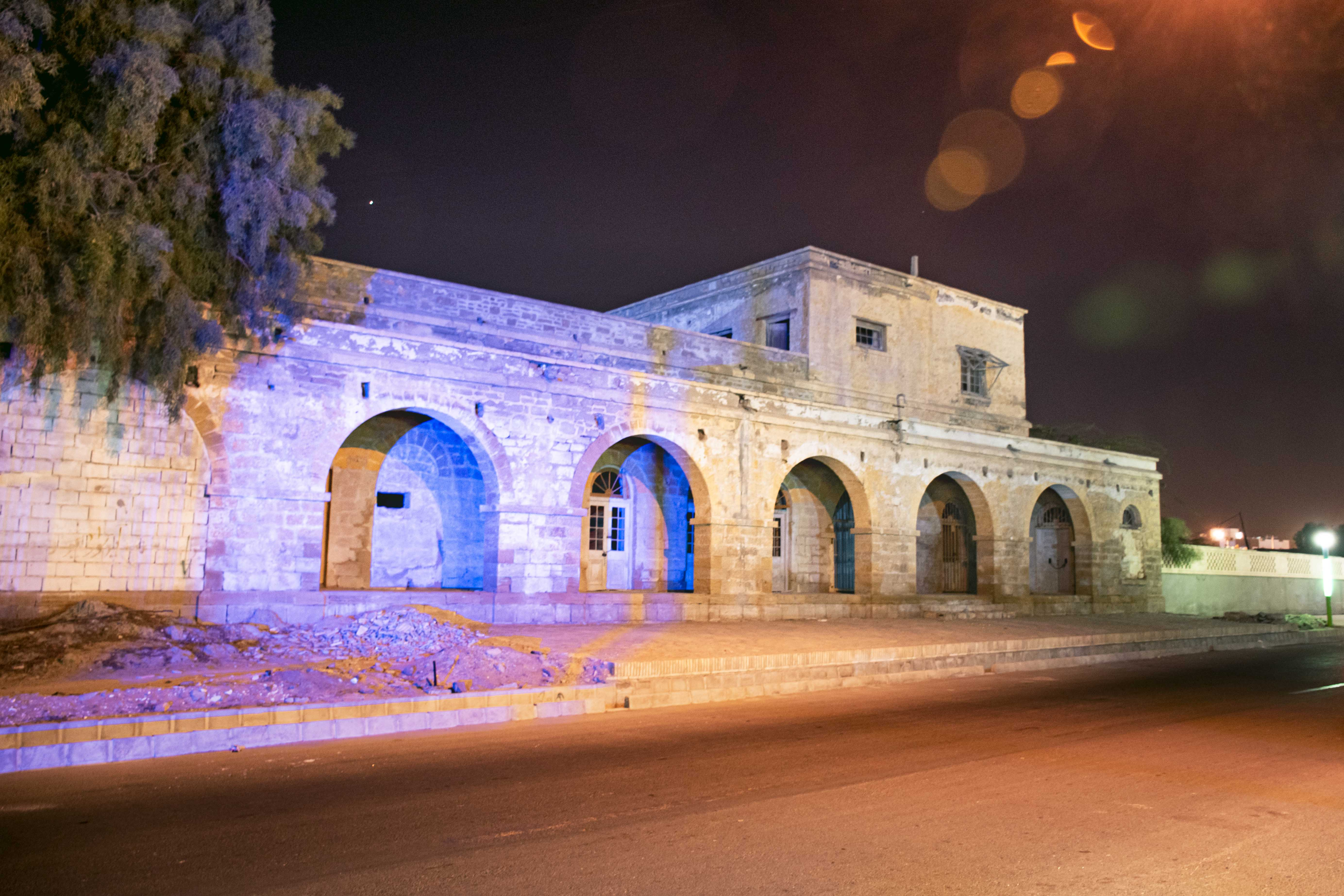

== See also ==
- Free Trade Zones in Iran
- International University of Chabahar
- Makran
- Chabahar Space Base
