= Augmentative =

Linguistic morphological form

An augmentative (abbreviated AUG) is a morphological form of a word which expresses greater intensity, often in size but also in other attributes. It is the opposite of a diminutive.

Overaugmenting something often makes it grotesque and so in some languages, augmentatives are used primarily for comical effect or as pejoratives.

Many languages have augmentatives for nouns, and some have augmentatives for verbs.

== Germanic languages ==
=== English ===
In modern English, augmentatives can be created with the prefixes:

- "over-": e.g., "overlord" and "overqualified".
- "grand-": e.g., "grandmaster" and "grandparent".
- "super-": e.g., "supermarket" and "superpower".
- "mega-": e.g., "megastore" and "megastar".
- "arch-": e.g., "archrival" and "archangel".

Since the early 1990s, the prefix "über-" or "uber-" has also frequently been used as a borrowing from German. The suffix -zilla (from Godzilla), expressing a monstrous quality, can also be considered an augmentative form.

- "-zilla": e.g., "momzilla" and "bridezilla".

In some parts of the United Kingdom and the Republic of Ireland, the prefix "old" is used as an augmentative, and a pejorative in some cases. An example of this is using "old’un" or "old one" to describe one's parents/grandparents.

=== Dutch ===
In modern Dutch, as in English, augmentatives are usually created with the prefixes:

- over-: e.g., overgewicht and oververhitting ("overweight" and "overheating")
- groot-: e.g., grootmeester and groothandel ("grandmaster" and "wholesaler")
- super-: e.g., supermarkt and supermacht ("supermarket" and "superpower").
- mega-: e.g., megacontract and megabioscoop ("a very big contract" and "a very large movie theater")

There are also prefixes that can be used for some adjectives:

- bloed- (blood) : e.g., bloedmooi and bloedeigen ("very beautiful" and "very own")
- steen- (stone): e.g., steenrijk and steengoed ("very rich" and "very good"; lit. "stone rich" and "stone good")
- kei- (boulder): e.g., keihard and keileuk ("very fast/hard/etc." and "very fun", lit. "boulder hard" and "boulder fun")

=== German ===
In German, there are different ways to build augmentatives. They are rarely used prefixes:

- un-, for instance in Unzahl "huge number", Unsumme "huge sum", Unmenge "huge quantity". Mostly used for negation, however (e.g. Unglück "bad luck", Unsinn "nonsense"), and occasionally in a pejorative sense (Unwetter "bad weather", Untier "monster", lit. "un-animal").
- ur-, for instance, uralt "ancient"
- über-, for instance, Übermensch (q.v.)
- aber-, for instance, abertausend "thousands"
- mega-, for example megageil "mega-cool"
- ultra-, for example ultrageil "ultra-cool"
- voll-, for example Vollidiot "utter idiot"
- riesen- (from Riese, meaning "giant"), for example riesengroß "enormous"
- stein-, for example steinalt "very old, ancient", steinreich "very rich, wealthy" (lit. "stone-old", "stone-rich")

=== Swedish ===
In Swedish, the way to build an augmentative is to add one of many prefixes before the main word, typically a noun, adjective or adverb. Some common prefixes are: jätte-, super-, bauta-, and mega-. For example:

- jätte- (meaning "giant"), for example jättesnabb "very fast"
- super-, for example supermycket "very much"
- bauta- (from bautasten, meaning "boulder"), for example bautaportion "very large serving (of food)"
- mega-, for example megahus "gigantic house"

There are many synonyms to the augmentative jätte-. Some of these synonyms are: as-, gör-, svin-, skit-, and ur-. These do not refer to size, only intensity, e.g. gul "yellow" to jättegul or skitgul "very yellow". Like many other augmentative prefixes, jätte- is also a noun that can be part of a compound word, e.g. jättelik "enormous" (literally "giantlike"), as opposed to jättelik "very similar".

The use of prefixes to build augmentatives in Swedish is colloquial and is seldom used in formal text and speech, where adjectives and adverbs are used instead.

== Greek language ==
In Modern Greek the usage of augmentative is very common in everyday speech but not quite as common as diminutive forms. The usage of augmentative is considered colloquial and it is not present at all in formal speech. There are a variety of augmentative suffixes

Fem. -α, -άρα, -άκλα
Masc. -αράς, ΄-αρος,-ακλάς, -ακλας

Most nouns in their augmentative form are feminine. This means neuter and masculine nouns become feminine and then an augmentative suffix is added.

{Ο παίχτης} → {Ο παιχταράς}
{The player (MASC)} {} {The great player (MASC)}

{(Η) κούκλα} → {(Η) κουκλάρα}
{beautiful woman} {} {very beautiful woman}

In some neuter cases just changing the original gender of the noun is enough for augmentation to take place

{Το σπαθί} → {Η σπάθα}
{The sword} {} {The great sword}

== Iranian languages ==
=== New Persian ===
In Persian, the suffix -ū (ـو) is used for augmentative; for instance:

- ریش (rīš "beard" ) → ریشو (rīšū "bearded, having a long beard" )
- شپش (šepeš "louse" ) → شپشو (šepešū "unhygine, having a lot of lice in hair/body hair" )
- ریغ (rīğ "puke" ) → ریغو (rīğū "unstable, puker, having a huge amount of vomiting / puking" )
- شاش (šāš "piss" ) → شاشو (šāšū "bedwetter, having a big piss" )
- دماغ (damāğ "nose" ) → دماغو (damāğū "having a long nose" )
- نفرین (nefrīn "curse" ) → نفرینو (nefrīnū "curser, who is always cursing a lot" )
- شکم (šekam "stomach" ) → شکمو (šekamū "gluttonous; having a big stomach to eat more" )
- پت (pot "body hair" (in Kermani's dialect) ) → پتو (potū "hairy" )
- اخم (axm "frown" ) → اخمو (axmū "frowny, who is always frowning a lot" )

== Romance languages ==
=== Italian ===
Italian has several augmentatives:

- -one, -ona, found also in several English loanwords from Italian, often via French: minestrone (< minestra 'soup'); provolone cheese (< provola 'a kind of cheese'); cartone (< carta 'paper') appears in English carton and cartoon; balloon (this may have been formed in Italian, though the usual form is pallone, or in French)); milione 'million' (< mille 'thousand');

Suffixes -accio, -accia, and -astro, -astra, also exist, but they are used to form pejorative words, with no properly augmentative meaning: coltellaccio (< coltello 'knife'; gives English cutlass); the family name Carpaccio.

=== Portuguese ===
In Portuguese, the most common augmentatives are the masculine -ão (sometimes also -zão or -zarrão) and the feminine -ona (or -zona), although there are others, less frequently used. E.g. carro "car", carrão "big car"; homem "man", homenzarrão "big man"; mulher "woman", mulherona "big woman".

Sometimes, especially in Brazilian Portuguese, the masculine augmentative can be applied to a feminine noun, which then becomes grammatically masculine, but with a feminine meaning (e.g. "o mulherão" instead of "a mulherona" for "the big woman"); however, such cases usually imply subtle meaning twists, mostly with a somewhat gross or vulgar undertone (which, nonetheless, is often intentional, for the sake of wit, malice or otherwise; so, mulherão actually means not a big woman, but a particularly sexy one).

=== Romanian ===
In Romanian there are several augmentative suffixes: -oi/-oaie, -an/-ană etc. (masculine/feminine pairs). They originate from Latin -ō (acc. sg. -ōnem), the origin of the other Romance augmentative suffixes. The archaic form has survived unchanged in Banat (and in Aromanian) as -on', -oan'e. As in other Romance languages, a feminine base word may have masculine or feminine forms in the augmentative. Examples:

- casă (f.) → căsoi (n.), căsoaie (f.)
- piatră (f.) → pietroi (n.)
- băiat (m.) → băiețoi (m.)
- băiat (m.) → băietan (m.)
- fată (f.) → fetișcană (f.)

=== Spanish ===
In Spanish, -o becomes -ón and -a becomes -ona most frequently, but -ote/-ota and -azo/-aza (also meaning -blow) are also commonly seen. Others include -udo/-uda, -aco/-aca, -acho/-acha, -uco/-uca, -ucho/-ucha, -astro/-astra and -ejo/-eja. More detail at Spanish nouns.

== Slavic languages ==
=== Bulgarian ===
In Bulgarian, as in Russian, mainly with -ище.

=== Polish ===
In Polish there is a variety of augmentatives formed with suffixes, for example: żaba (a frog) → żabucha / żabsko / żabisko / żabula; or kamień (a stone) → kamulec / kamior / etc.

- -ica, e.g. igła, f. ("needle") + ica → iglica ("spire")
- -yca, e.g. wieża, f. ("tower") + yca → wieżyca
- -ch, e.g. Stanisław, m. ("Stan") + ch → Stach (short form of the name, but not diminutive)
- -chu e.g. Krzysztof, m ("Christopher") + chu → Krzychu ("Chris")
- -cha, e.g. kiełbasa f. ("sausage") + cha → kiełbacha ("large sausage")
- -ucha, e.g. dziewa, f. archaic ("girl") + ucha → dziewucha ("wench")
- -oja, e.g. dziewa, f. archaic ("girl") + oja → dziewoja ("wench")
- -uch, e.g. uparty, adj. m. ("stubborn") + uch → uparciuch
- -ocha, e.g. śpi, v. ("sleeps") + och → śpioch ("sleepyhead")
- -och, e.g. tłusty, adj. m. ("fat") + och → tłuścioch ("fatso", "fatty")
- -al, e.g. nos, m. ("nose") + al → nochal ("large nose")
- -ula, e.g. smark, m. ("snot") + ula → smarkula ("snotty young person")
- -ała, e.g. jąkać się ("to stutter") + ała → jąkała ("stutterer")
- -isko, e.g. wąs, m. ("mustache") + isko → wąsisko ("large mustache")
- -sko, e.g. baba, f. ("woman") + sko → babsko ("hag")
- -ysko, e.g. biedak m. ("pauper") + ysko → biedaczysko ("poor fellow")
- -or, e.g. but m. ("shoe") + or → bucior ("large or dirty shoe")
- -er, e.g. bóbr m. ("beaver") + er → bober ("large beaver")

=== Russian ===
In Russian there is a variety of augmentatives formed with prefixes (including loans from Latin) and suffixes, including -ище and -ина for example: дом ('house') домище ('great house') домина ('huge house'). To provide an impression of excessive qualities the suffix -га can be used for example: ветер ('wind'), ветрюга ('strong wind').

=== Serbo-Croatian ===
In Serbo-Croatian there is a variety of augmentative nouns formed with suffixes:

- -ina, e.g. brdo, n. ("hill") + ina → brdina
- -čina, e.g. majmun, m. ("monkey") + čina → majmunčina
- -etina, e.g. kuća, f. ("house") + etina → kućetina
- -erina, e.g. kuća + erina → kućerina
- -urina, e.g. ptica, f. ("bird") + urina → ptičurina
- -ešina, e.g. glava, f. ("head") + ešina → glavešina
- -uština, e.g. bara, f. ("pond") + uština → baruština
- -ušina, e.g. pijetao, m. ("rooster") + ušina → pjetlušina

Augmentative nouns are either pejoratives, although distinct pejorative suffixes also exist. All augmentative nouns have female grammatical gender. Some nouns can have their augmentatives formed with different suffixes, for example, see 'kuća' above.

In Hrvatska gramatika, Barić et al. do not classify adjectives formed with suffixes which intensify an action or property as augmentatives. The augmentative prefixes for adjectives listed in Hrvatska gramatika are pre- ("excessively"; or excess of a favorable property), hiper- ("hyper-"), super- and ultra-. According to Hrvatska enciklopedija, augmentative verbs surpass their base verb with their intensity. However, by defining augmentative verbs as an action done excessively, Hrvatska gramatika only lists pre- ("over-") as an augmentative verb.

== Semitic languages ==
=== Arabic ===
Form II of the Arabic verb often has an augmentative sense, which may indicate intensity (intensive) or repetition (frequentative).

== Bantu languages ==
Bantu languages' noun class markers often double as augmentative and diminutive markers, and some have separate classes that are used only as an augmentative or a diminutive.

=== Chichewa ===
Chichewa noun class 7 prefix chi- doubles up as augmentative marker. For example, chindege which is a huge plane as opposed to ndege which is just a regular plane.

== International auxiliary languages ==
=== Esperanto ===
In Esperanto, the -eg- infix is included before the final part-of-speech vowel. For example, domo (house) becomes domego (mansion). See Esperanto vocabulary.

=== Interlingua ===
Interlingua does not have an augmentative suffix, but international prefixes such as super-, hyper-, mega- can be used as augmentatives. See also Interlingua grammar.

== See also ==
- Diminutive
- Affect (linguistics)
- Comparison (grammar)
