= Kermanshah (disambiguation) =

Kermanshah may refer to:

- Kermanshah, a city in Iran
- Kermanshah County, an administrative subdivision of Iran
- Kermanshah Province, an administrative subdivision of Iran
- Kermanshah, Kohgiluyeh and Boyer-Ahmad, a village in Iran
- USS Kermanshah (ID-1473), a United States Navy cargo ship in commission from 1918 to 1919

== See also ==
- Kerman (disambiguation)
