= Kerman (disambiguation) =

Kerman is the capital city of Kerman Province, Iran.

Kerman or Kirman may also refer to:

== Places ==
- Kirman (Sasanian province), province of the Sasanian Empire
- Kerman province, province of Iran
  - Kerman County
- Kerman, Mazandaran, a village
- Kerman, California

== People ==
- Joseph Kerman (1924–2014), American musicologist
- Langston Kerman (born 1986), American actor, writer, and comedian
- Piper Kerman (born 1969), American author
- Aaron Kirman (fl. 2018–2019), American real estate agent
- Richard Kirman Sr. (1877–1959), American politician
- Kerman Haynes (born 1976), American entrepreneur, inventor, and philosopher

== Other ==
- Kerman carpet, a type of Persian carpet
- Kerbal Space Program, a game which assigns the last name Kerman to all characters

== See also ==
- Kermani (disambiguation)
- Kirmani
- Kermanshah (disambiguation)
