= List of people from Kerman =

Here is a complete list for notable people who lived or from Kerman:

== A ==
- Ahmadreza Ahmadi, poet
- Mahnaz Afkhami, former Minister of Women's Affairs of Iran (1975) & Founder and President of Women's Learning Partnership (WLP)
- Ali Akbar Abdolrashidi, writer, journalist and television host.

== B ==
- Abbas Bagheri Lotfabad, Iranian ophthalmologist
- Arash Borhani, Soccer player

== K ==
- Khwaju Kermani, poet from the 14th century.
- Roohollah Khaleghi, Iranian musician, composer, conductor and author.

== M ==
- Houshang Moradi Kermani, author.
- Ahmad Madani, Iranian politician, Commander of Iranian Navy (1979)
- Mirza Aqa Khan Kermani, constitutionalist, an Iranian literary critic and founder of new Iranian nationalism.

== N ==
- Zahra Nemati, Paralympic archery gold medallist At the 2012 Summer Paralympics.
- Dr. Javad Nurbakhsh, Master of the Nimatullahi Sufi Order.

== See also ==
- Kirmani, toponymic surname
