= Kirmani =

Kirmani or Kermani (Persian: کرمانی) is a locational surname of Persian origin, which originally meant a person from the city of Kerman, Iran. Notable people with the surname include:

- Abu al-Hakam al-Kirmani (died 1066), Andalus philosopher
- Afdhal al-Din abu Hamid Kermani (1136–1218), Persian writer
- Asif Kirmani, Pakistani senator
- Auhaduddin Kermani (died 1298), Persian poet
- Burhan-ud-din Kermani (died 1449), Persian physician
- Faris Kermani (born 1952), Pakistani film director
- Hamid al-Din al-Kirmani (died 1021), Persian theologian
- Daud Bandagi Kirmani (born 1513), Sufi saint
- Houshang Moradi Kermani (born 1944), Iranian writer
- Karim Khan Kermani (1810–1873), Persian scholar
- Kazem Sami Kermani (1935–1988), Iranian politician
- Khwaju Kermani (1280–1352), Persian poet
- Mehdi Sadegh Taghavi Kermani (born 1987), Iranian wrestler
- Milad Kermani (born 1992), Iranian football player
- Mirza Aqa Khan Kermani (1854–1897), Iranian literary critic
- Mohammad-Ali Movahedi Kermani (born 1931), Iranian politician
- Morteza Kermani-Moghaddam (born 1965), Iranian football player
- Muhammad Aqa-Kermani (fl. 1747), Persian physician
- Navid Kermani (born 1967), German writer
- Sadiq Kirmani (born 1989), Indian cricketer
- Sayed Jaffar (field hockey) (born 1911), Indian hockey player
- Shams-ud-Din Kermani (died 1384), Persian scholar
- Syed Kirmani (born 1949), Indian cricketer
- Syed Shah Kazem Kirmani (born 1998), Bangladeshi cricketer
- Zaheer Abbas (born 1947), Pakistani cricketer and administrator

== See also ==
- Kermani (disambiguation)
- Kerman
- Kerman gum
- List of people from Kerman
