= Milak, Sistan and Baluchestan =

Milak ميلك
- Village
- Location within Iran
- Coordinates: 30°58′12″N 61°48′33″E
- Country: Iran
- Province: Sistan and Baluchestan
- County: Hirmand
- Bakhsh: Central
- Rural District: Jahanabad
- Elevation: 478 m (1,568 ft)

Population (2006)
  - Total: 2,385
- Time zone: UTC+3:30 (IRST)
  - Summer (DST): UTC+4:30 (IRDT)

Milak (Persian: ميلك, also Romanized as Mīlak) is a village in Jahanabad Rural District, in the Central District of Hirmand County, Sistan and Baluchestan Province, Iran. At the 2006 census, its population was 2,385, in 444 families.

Milak is situated on the Afghanistan-Iran border. It is one of the major junctions that connects land-locked Afghanistan to international waters through Iran. After the collapse of the Taliban government in Afghanistan, Milak lost importance in the transit of goods to Afghanistan. In recent years, Afghanistan, Iran and India have agreed to reactivate the Milak route by building a new international logistics hub in Chabahar, connected to Milak.

In 2004, the governments of Iran and Afghanistan officially reopened the Milak-Zaranj border crossing, which is heavily used today.

There is also a project for a railway connection to Chabahar via Zahedan.

The Milak-Zaranj Bridge crosses the Helmand River.
