= Kermani =

Kermani (Persian: كرماني) may refer to:

- Kermani (surname)
- Kermani, Kerman, a village in Kerman Province, Iran
- Kermani, Yazd, a village in Yazd Province, Iran

== See also ==
- Kerman (disambiguation)
- Kamani (disambiguation)
- Kirmani
