= Garmasha =

Garmasha گرماشا
- Village
- Location within Iran
- Coordinates: 31°01′37″N 50°10′59″E
- Country: Iran
- Province: Kohgiluyeh and Boyer-Ahmad
- County: Bahmai
- Bakhsh: Bahmai-ye Garmsiri
- Rural District: Sar Asiab-e Yusefi

Population (2006)
  - Total: 95
- Time zone: UTC+3:30 (IRST)
  - Summer (DST): UTC+4:30 (IRDT)

Garmasha (Persian: گرماشا, also Romanized as Garmāshā; also known as Garmānshāh, Garmā Shāh, and Kermānshāh) is a village in Sar Asiab-e Yusefi Rural District, Bahmai-ye Garmsiri District, Bahmai County, Kohgiluyeh and Boyer-Ahmad Province, Iran. At the 2006 census, its population was 95, in 18 families.
