= Afzal al-Din Kermani =

Iranian historian and physician

Afzal al-Din Kermani (Persian: افضل الدین کرمانی) was a Persian historian, author, poet, philosopher, and physician in the early 12th and early 13th centuries. He wrote the books Aghd Al ala Lel Moghefe Al ahla and Badayeh o Zaman Fi Vaghayeh Kerman about the geography and history of Kerman.

== Sources ==
- Pārīzī, M. E. Bāstānī (1984). "Afżal-al-dīn Kermānī". Encyclopaedia Iranica, Vol. I, Fasc. 6. D. M. Dunlop. p. 599.
