= Rame, Punjab =

Rame
- Village
- Location in Punjab, India Rame (India)
- Coordinates: 31.0465331°N 75.2519802°E
- Country: India
- State: Punjab
- District: Jalandhar
- Tehsil: Shahkot

Government
  - Type: Panchayat raj
  - Body: Gram panchayat
- Elevation: 240 m (790 ft)

Population (2011)
  - Total: 1,218
- Sex ratio 628/590 ♂/♀

Languages
  - Official: Punjabi
- Time zone: UTC+5:30 (IST)
- ISO 3166 code: IN-PB
- Vehicle registration: PB- 08
- Website: jalandhar.nic.in

Rame is a village in Shahkot in Jalandhar district of Punjab State, India. It is located 11 kilometres (6.8 mi) from Shahkot, 32 kilometres (20 mi) from Nakodar, 53 kilometres (33 mi) from district headquarter Jalandhar and 183 kilometres (114 mi) from state capital Chandigarh. The village is administrated by a sarpanch who is an elected representative of village as per Panchayati raj (India).

== Transport ==
Shahkot Malisian station is the nearest train station. The village is 94 kilometres (58 mi) away from domestic airport in Ludhiana and the nearest international airport is located in Chandigarh also Sri Guru Ram Dass Jee International Airport is the second nearest airport which is 113 kilometres (70 mi) away in Amritsar.
