= Bara Budhsingh =

- Village
- Interactive map of Bara Budhsingh
- Coordinates: 31.17785°N 75.20268°E
- Country: India
- State: Punjab
- District: Jalandhar
- Tehsil: Shahkot

Government
  - Type: Panchayat raj
  - Body: Gram panchayat

Area
  - Total: 141.2 ha (349 acres)

Population (2011)
  - Total: 547; 270/277 ♂/♀
  - Scheduled Castes: 162; 76/86 ♂/♀
  - Total Households: 117

Languages
  - Official: Punjabi
- Time zone: UTC+5:30 (IST)
- ISO 3166 code: IN-PB
- Website: jalandhar.gov.in

Bara Budhsingh is a village in Shahkot in Jalandhar district of Punjab State, India. It is located 28 kilometres (17 mi) from sub district headquarter and 52 kilometres (32 mi) from district headquarter. The village is administrated by Sarpanch an elected representative of the village.

== Demography ==
As of 2011, the village has a total number of 117 houses and a population of 547 of which 270 are males while 277 are females. According to the report published by Census India in 2011, out of the total population of the village 162 people are from Schedule Caste and the village does not have any Schedule Tribe population so far.

== See also ==
- List of villages in India
