= Raunt =

- Village
- Location in Punjab, India Raunt (India)
- Coordinates: 31.0338631°N 75.3456001°E
- Country: India
- State: Punjab
- District: Jalandhar
- Tehsil: Shahkot

Government
  - Type: Panchayat raj
  - Body: Gram panchayat
- Elevation: 240 m (790 ft)

Population (2011)
  - Total: 885
- Sex ratio 472/413 ♂/♀

Languages
  - Official: Punjabi
- Time zone: UTC+5:30 (IST)
- ISO 3166 code: IN-PB
- Vehicle registration: PB- 08
- Website: jalandhar.nic.in

Raunt is a village in Shahkot, situated in Jalandhar district of Punjab State, in India. It is located 7 kilometres (4.3 mi) from Shahkot, 24 kilometres (15 mi) from Nakodar, 49 kilometres (30 mi) from district headquarter Jalandhar, and 102 kilometres (63 mi) from the state capital Chandigarh. The village is administrated by a sarpanch, who is an elected representative of village, as per Panchayati raj (India).

== Transport ==
Shahkot Malisian station is the nearest train station. The village is 20 kilometres (12 mi) away from domestic airport in Ludhiana, and the nearest international airport is located in Chandigarh. Also, Sri Guru Ram Dass Jee International Airport is the second nearest airport, which is 119 kilometres (74 mi) away in Amritsar.
