= Rupewali =

- Village
- Location in Punjab, India Rupewali (India)
- Coordinates: 31.143048°N 75.3001652°E
- Country: India
- State: Punjab
- District: Jalandhar
- Tehsil: Shahkot

Government
  - Type: Panchayat raj
  - Body: Gram panchayat
- Elevation: 240 m (790 ft)

Population (2011)
  - Total: 1,027
- Sex ratio 536/491 ♂/♀

Languages
  - Official: Punjabi
- Time zone: UTC+5:30 (IST)
- ISO 3166 code: IN-PB
- Vehicle registration: PB- 08
- Website: jalandhar.nic.in

Rupewali is a village in Shahkot in Jalandhar district of Punjab State, India. It is located 12 kilometres (7.5 mi) from Shahkot, 20 kilometres (12 mi) from Nakodar, 43 kilometres (27 mi) from district headquarter Jalandhar and 174 kilometres (108 mi) from state capital Chandigarh. The village is administrated by a sarpanch who is an elected representative of village as per Panchayati raj (India).

== Transport ==
Shahkot Malisian station is the nearest train station. The village is 81 kilometres (50 mi) away from domestic airport in Ludhiana and the nearest international airport is located in Chandigarh also Sri Guru Ram Dass Jee International Airport is the second nearest airport which is 110 kilometres (68 mi) away in Amritsar.
