= Meda, Punjab =

Meda
- Village
- Location in Punjab, India Meda (India)
- Coordinates: 31.1197519°N 75.2666313°E
- Country: India
- State: Punjab
- District: Jalandhar
- Tehsil: Shahkot

Government
  - Type: Panchayat raj
  - Body: Gram panchayat
- Elevation: 240 m (790 ft)

Population (2011)
  - Total: 635
- Sex ratio 308/327 ♂/♀

Languages
  - Official: Punjabi
- Time zone: UTC+5:30 (IST)
- ISO 3166 code: IN-PB
- Vehicle registration: PB- 08
- Website: jalandhar.nic.in

Meda is a village in Shahkot in Jalandhar district of Punjab State, India. It is located 17 kilometres (11 mi) from Shahkot, 25 kilometres (16 mi) from Nakodar, 45 kilometres (28 mi) from district headquarter Jalandhar and 179 kilometres (111 mi) from state capital Chandigarh. The village is administrated by a sarpanch who is an elected representative of village as per Panchayati raj (India). Before India's independence, Baba Santa Singh was elected Sarpanch Unanimously of the area, who governed this village for more than 25 years. He was a goldsmith and landowner. Nambardar of the village for almost similar years was Sardar Basant Singh. Many residents of this village now live abroad.

== Transport ==
Shahkot Malisian station is the nearest train station. The village is 86 kilometres (53 mi) away from domestic airport in Ludhiana and the nearest international airport is located in Chandigarh. Sri Guru Ram Dass Jee International Airport is the second nearest airport which is 102 kilometres (63 mi) away in Amritsar.
