= Malupur =

- Village
- Location in Punjab, India Malupur (India)
- Coordinates: 31.166508°N 75.3125902°E
- Country: India
- State: Punjab
- District: Jalandhar
- Tehsil: Shahkot

Government
  - Type: Panchayat raj
  - Body: Gram panchayat
- Elevation: 240 m (790 ft)

Population (2011)
  - Total: 524
- Sex ratio 262/262 ♂/♀

Languages
  - Official: Punjabi
- Time zone: UTC+5:30 (IST)
- ISO 3166 code: IN-PB
- Website: jalandhar.nic.in

Malupur is a village in Shahkot in Jalandhar district of Punjab, India. It is 14 kilometres (8.7 mi) from Shahkot, 22 kilometres (14 mi) from Nakodar, 36 kilometres (22 mi) from district headquarter Jalandhar and 177 kilometres (110 mi) from state capital Chandigarh. The village is administered by Sarpanch, an elected representative of the village.

== Transport ==
Shahkot Malisian station is the nearest train station. The village is 83 kilometres (52 mi) away from domestic airport in Ludhiana, and the nearest international airport is in Chandigarh. Sri Guru Ram Dass Jee International Airport is the second-nearest airport, which is 103 kilometres (64 mi) away in Amritsar.
