= Lasuri =

- Village
- Location in Punjab, India Lasuri (India)
- Coordinates: 31.0444409°N 75.7127738°E
- Country: India
- State: Punjab
- District: Jalandhar
- Tehsil: Shahkot

Government
  - Type: Panchayat raj
  - Body: Gram panchayat
- Elevation: 220 m (720 ft)

Population (2011)
  - Total: 1,243
- Sex ratio 614/629 ♂/♀

Languages
  - Official: Punjabi
- Time zone: UTC+5:30 (IST)
- Website: jalandhar.nic.in

Lasuri is a village in Shahkot in Jalandhar district of Punjab State, India. It is located 7 kilometres (4.3 mi) from Shahkot, and 52 kilometres (32 mi) from the district headquarters of Jalandhar. The village is administered by a sarpanch who is an elected representative of village as per Panchayati raj (India).

The local language of Lasuri is Punjabi, the village population is 1243 in 240 houses. 50.6% of the population is female. The village literacy rate is 71.1%, and the female literacy rate is 33.3%.

== Population ==
Census parameter	Census data
Total population	1243
Total number of houses	240
Female population %	50.6 % (629)
Total literacy rate %	71.1 % (884)
Female literacy rate	33.3 % (414)
Scheduled tribes population %	0.0 % (0)
Scheduled caste population %	35.5 % (441)
Working population %	35.2 %
Child (0 -6) population by 2011	119
Girl child (0 -6) population % by 2011	43.7 % (52)

== Transport ==
Sindhar station is the nearest train station. The village is 69 kilometres (43 mi) away from the domestic airport in Ludhiana, and the nearest international airport is 87 kilometres (54 mi) away in Amritsar.
