= Sandhanwal =

Sandhanwal ਸੰਢਾਵਾਲ
- Village
- Sandhanwal
- Country: India
- State: Punjab
- District: Jalandhar
- Tehsil: Shahkot
- Founder: Lal Singh Gill

Government
  - Type: Panchayat raj
  - Body: Gram panchayat

Area
  - Total: 430 ha (1,100 acres)

Population (2021)
  - Total: 2,776; 1,997/773 ♂/♀
  - Scheduled Castes: 77; 12/65 ♂/♀
  - Total Households: 192
- Demonym: Sandhanwalia ( sing.)

Languages
  - Official: Punjabi (Doabi Dialect)
- Time zone: UTC+5:30 (IST)
- ISO 3166 code: IN-PB
- Vehicle registration: PB-67
- Website: jalandhar.gov.in

Sandhanwal is a very famous village in Shahkot in Jalandhar district of Punjab State, India. It is located 5 kilometres (3.1 mi) from Shahkot, 47 kilometres (29 mi) from Jalandhar and 177 kilometres from Chandigarh. The village is administrated by Sarpanch an elected representative of the village.

== Demography ==
As of 2021, the village has a total number of 580 houses and a population of 2,776 of which 1957 are males while 673 are females. As of 2021, out of the total population of the village 77 people are from Schedule Caste and the village does not have any Schedule Tribe population so far.

== See also ==
- List of villages in India
