= Nawanpind Akaliwala =

- Village
- Location in Punjab, India Nawanpind Akaliwala (India)
- Coordinates: 31.0818315°N 75.2559185°E
- Country: India
- State: Punjab
- District: Jalandhar
- Tehsil: Shahkot

Government
  - Type: Panchayat raj
  - Body: Gram panchayat
- Elevation: 240 m (790 ft)

Population (2011)
  - Total: 566
- Sex ratio 290/276 ♂/♀

Languages
  - Official: Punjabi
- Time zone: UTC+5:30 (IST)
- ISO 3166 code: IN-PB
- Vehicle registration: PB- 08
- Website: jalandhar.nic.in

Nawanpind Akaliwala is a village in Shahkot in Jalandhar district of Punjab State, India. It is located 8.8 kilometres (5.5 mi) from Shahkot, 26.8 kilometres (16.7 mi) from Nakodar, 50.4 kilometres (31.3 mi) from district headquarter Jalandhar and 181 kilometres (112 mi) from state capital Chandigarh. The village is administrated by a sarpanch who is an elected representative of village as per Panchayati raj (India).

== Population ==
According to a 2011 census report Akaliwala has 105 households with a total population of 566 persons of which 290 are male and 276 are female. The total population of children in the age group 0-6 is 26.

== Transport ==
Shahkot Malisian station is the nearest train station. The village is 88 kilometres (55 mi) away from domestic airport in Ludhiana and the nearest international airport is located in Chandigarh also Sri Guru Ram Dass Jee International Airport is the second nearest airport which is 106 kilometres (66 mi) away in Amritsar.
