= Gidarpindi =

- Village
- Country: India
- State: Punjab
- District: Jalandhar
- Tehsil: Shahkot

Government
  - Type: Panchayat raj
  - Body: Gram panchayat

Area
  - Total: 451 ha (1,110 acres)

Population (2011)
  - Total: 2,181; 1,143/1,038 ♂/♀
  - Scheduled Castes: 491; 246/245 ♂/♀
  - Total Households: 388

Languages
  - Official: Punjabi
- Time zone: UTC+5:30 (IST)
- ISO 3166 code: IN-PB
- Website: jalandhar.gov.in

Gidarpindi is a village in Shahkot in Jalandhar district of Punjab State, India. It is located 28 kilometres (17 mi) from sub district headquarter and 60 kilometres (37 mi) from district headquarter. The village is administrated by Sarpanch an elected representative of the village.

== Demography ==
As of 2011, the village has a total number of 388 houses and a population of 2181 of which 1143 are males while 1038 are females. According to the report published by Census India in 2011, out of the total population of the village 491 people are from Schedule Caste and the village does not have any Schedule Tribe population so far.

== See also ==
- List of villages in India
