= Sand, Punjab =

Sand
- Village
- Location in Punjab, India Sand (India)
- Coordinates: 31°01′14″N 75°20′17″E
- Country: India
- State: Punjab
- District: Jalandhar
- Tehsil: Shahkot

Government
  - Type: Panchayat raj
  - Body: Gram panchayat
- Elevation: 240 m (790 ft)

Population (2011)
  - Total: 878
- Sex ratio 399/388 ♂/♀

Languages
  - Official: Punjabi
- Time zone: UTC+5:30 (IST)
- ISO 3166 code: IN-PB
- Vehicle registration: PB- 08
- Website: jalandhar.nic.in

Sand is a village in Shahkot in Jalandhar district of Punjab State, India. It is located 9.4 kilometres (5.8 mi) from Shahkot, 26.5 kilometres (16.5 mi) from Nakodar, 51.5 kilometres (32.0 mi) from district headquarter Jalandhar and 176 kilometres (109 mi) from state capital Chandigarh. The village is administrated by a sarpanch who is an elected representative of village as per Panchayati raj (India).

== Demography ==
As of 2011, Sand has a total number of 157 houses and a population of 787 of which include 399 are males while 388 are females according to the report published by Census India in 2011. The literacy rate of the village is 64.93%, lower than state average of 75.84%. The population of children under the age of 6 years is 77 which is 9.78% of total population of the village, and child sex ratio is approximately 1026 higher than state average of 846.

Most of the people are from Schedule Caste which constitutes 60.10% of total population in the village. The town does not have any Schedule Tribe population so far.

As per census 2011, 349 people were engaged in work activities out of the total population of the village which includes 250 males and 99 females. According to census survey report 2011, 88.54% workers describe their work as main work and 11.46% workers are involved in marginal activity providing livelihood for less than 6 months.

== Transport ==
Shahkot Malisian station is the nearest train station. The village is 86 kilometres (53 mi) away from domestic airport in Ludhiana and the nearest international airport is located in Chandigarh also Sri Guru Ram Dass Jee International Airport is the second nearest airport which is 121 kilometres (75 mi) away in Amritsar.

== See also ==
- List of villages in India
