= Namazipur =

- Village
- Location in Punjab, India Namazipur (India)
- Coordinates: 31.1222226°N 75.3041901°E
- Country: India
- State: Punjab
- District: Jalandhar
- Tehsil: Shahkot

Government
  - Type: Panchayat raj
  - Body: Gram panchayat
- Elevation: 240 m (790 ft)

Population (2011)
  - Total: 402
- Sex ratio 200/202 ♂/♀

Languages
  - Official: Punjabi
- Time zone: UTC+5:30 (IST)
- ISO 3166 code: IN-PB
- Vehicle registration: PB- 08
- Website: jalandhar.nic.in

Namazipur is a village in Shahkot in Jalandhar district of Punjab State, India. It is located 7 kilometres (4.3 mi) from Shahkot, 16 kilometres (9.9 mi) from Nakodar, 41 kilometres (25 mi) from district headquarter Jalandhar and 172 kilometres (107 mi) from state capital Chandigarh. The village is administrated by a sarpanch who is an elected representative of village as per Panchayati raj (India).

== Population ==
According to 2011 census report Namazipur has 69 households with the total population of 402 persons of which 200 are male and 202 are female. The total population of children in the age group 0-6 is 27.

== Transport ==
Shahkot Malisian station is the nearest train station. The village is 78 kilometres (48 mi) away from domestic airport in Ludhiana and the nearest international airport is located in Chandigarh also Sri Guru Ram Dass Jee International Airport is the second nearest airport which is 110 kilometres (68 mi) away in Amritsar.
