= Isewal, Jalandhar =

Isewal
- Village
- Country: India
- State: Punjab
- District: Jalandhar
- Tehsil: Shahkot

Government
  - Type: Panchayat raj
  - Body: Gram panchayat

Area
  - Total: 166 ha (410 acres)

Population (2011)
  - Total: 500; 235/265 ♂/♀
  - Scheduled Castes: 139; 60/79 ♂/♀
  - Total Households: 99

Languages
  - Official: Punjabi
- Time zone: UTC+5:30 (IST)
- ISO 3166 code: IN-PB
- Website: jalandhar.gov.in

Isewal is a village in Shahkot in Jalandhar district of Punjab State, India. It is located 11 kilometres (6.8 mi) from the sub district headquarters and 44 kilometres (27 mi) from district headquarters. The village is administrated by Sarpanch, an elected representative of the village.

== Demography ==
As of 2011, the village has a total number of 99 houses and a population of 500, of which 235 are male while 265 are female. According to the report published by Census India in 2011, out of the total population of the village 139 people are from Schedule Caste although the village does not have a Schedule Tribe population.

== See also ==
- List of villages in India
