= Kotli Gazran =

Coordinates: 31°07′N 75°20′E

- Village
- Location in Punjab, India Kotli Gazran (India)
- Country: India
- State: Punjab
- District: Jalandhar
- Tehsil: Shahkot

Government
  - Type: Panchayat raj
  - Body: Gram panchayat

Area
  - Total: 406.48 ha (1,004.4 acres)

Population (2011)
  - Total: 1,952; 1,013/939 ♂/♀
  - Scheduled Castes: 1,289; 671/618 ♂/♀
  - Total Households: 387

Languages
  - Official: Punjabi
- Time zone: UTC+5:30 (IST)
- ISO 3166 code: IN-PB
- Website: jalandhar.gov.in

Kotli Gazran is a village in Shahkot in Jalandhar district of Punjab State, India. It is located 5 kilometres (3.1 mi) from sub district headquarter and 40 kilometres (25 mi) from district headquarter. The village is administrated by Sarpanch an elected representative of the village.

== Demography ==
As of 2011, the village has a total number of 387 houses and a population of 1,952 of which 1,013 are males while 939 are females. According to the report published by Census India in 2011, out of the total population of the village 1289 people are from Schedule Caste and the village does not have any Schedule Tribe population so far.

== See also ==
- List of villages in India
