= Mohriwal =

- Village
- Country: India
- State: Punjab
- District: Jalandhar
- Tehsil: Shahkot

Government
  - Type: Panchayat raj
  - Body: Gram panchayat

Area
  - Total: 159 ha (390 acres)

Population (2011)
  - Total: 372; 195/177 ♂/♀
  - Scheduled Castes: 160; 91/69 ♂/♀
  - Total Households: 83

Languages
  - Official: Punjabi
- Time zone: UTC+5:30 (IST)
- ISO 3166 code: IN-PB
- Website: jalandhar.gov.in

Mohriwal is a village in Shahkot, Jalandhar, Punjab, India. It is located 9 kilometres (5.6 mi) from the sub district headquarter and 54 kilometres (34 mi) from the district headquarter. The village is administrated by the local sarpanch — an elected representative of the village.

== Demography ==
As of 2011, the village has 83 houses and a population of 372, out of which 195 are male and 177 are female. 160 people out of the total are from scheduled castes.

== See also ==
- List of villages in India
