= Sarangwal =

- Village
- Location in Punjab, India Sarangwal (India)
- Coordinates: 31.076313°N 75.2947202°E
- Country: India
- State: Punjab
- District: Jalandhar
- Tehsil: Shahkot

Government
  - Type: Panchayat raj
  - Body: Gram panchayat
- Elevation: 240 m (790 ft)

Population (2011)
  - Total: 789
- Sex ratio 414/375 ♂/♀

Languages
  - Official: Punjabi
- Time zone: UTC+5:30 (IST)
- ISO 3166 code: IN-PB
- Vehicle registration: PB- 08
- Website: jalandhar.nic.in

Sarangwal is a village in Shahkot in Jalandhar district of Punjab State, India. It is located 3.5 kilometres (2.2 mi) from Shahkot, 21.5 kilometres (13.4 mi) from Nakodar, 45 kilometres (28 mi) from district headquarter Jalandhar and 176 kilometres (109 mi) from state capital Chandigarh. The village is administrated by a sarpanch who is an elected representative of village as per Panchayati raj (India).

== Demography ==
As of 2011, Qadian has a total number of 167 houses and a population of 789 of which include 414 are males while 375 are females according to the report published by Census India in 2011. The literacy rate of the village is 74.82%, lower than state average of 75.84%. The population of children under the age of 6 years is 82 which is 10.39% of total population of the village, and child sex ratio is approximately 952 higher than state average of 846.

Most of the people are from Schedule Caste which constitutes 65.27% of total population in the village. The town does not have any Schedule Tribe population so far.

As per census 2011, 325 people were engaged in work activities out of the total population of the village which includes 264 males and 61 females. According to census survey report 2011, 77.23% workers describe their work as main work and 22.77% workers are involved in marginal activity providing livelihood for less than 6 months.

== Transport ==
Shahkot Malisian station is the nearest train station. The village is 82 kilometres (51 mi) away from domestic airport in Ludhiana and the nearest international airport is located in Chandigarh also Sri Guru Ram Dass Jee International Airport is the second nearest airport which is 115 kilometres (71 mi) away in Amritsar.

== See also ==
- List of villages in India
