= Maharajwala =

Coordinates: 31°07′N 75°11′E

- Village
- Location in Punjab, India Maharajwala (India)
- Country: India
- State: Punjab
- District: Jalandhar
- Tehsil: Shahkot

Government
  - Type: Panchayat raj
  - Body: Gram panchayat

Area
  - Total: 517.2 ha (1,278 acres)

Population (2011)
  - Total: 855; 444/411 ♂/♀
  - Scheduled Castes: 140; 68/72 ♂/♀
  - Total Households: 157

Languages
  - Official: Punjabi
- Time zone: UTC+5:30 (IST)
- ISO 3166 code: IN-PB
- Website: jalandhar.gov.in

Maharajwala is a village in Shahkot in Jalandhar district of Punjab State, India. It is located 17 kilometres (11 mi) from sub district headquarter and 70 kilometres (43 mi) from district headquarter. The village is administrated by Sarpanch an elected representative of the village.

== Demography ==
As of 2011, the village has a total number of 157 houses and a population of 855 of which 444 are males while 411 are females. According to the report published by Census India in 2011, out of the total population of the village 140 people are from Schedule Caste and the village does not have any Schedule Tribe population so far.

== See also ==
- List of villages in India
