= Bajwa Kalan =

- Village
- Location in Punjab, India Bajwa Kalan (India)
- Coordinates: 31.0556361°N 75.3182423°E
- Country: India
- State: Punjab
- District: Jalandhar
- Tehsil: Shahkot

Government
  - Type: Panchayat raj
  - Body: Gram panchayat
- Elevation: 240 m (790 ft)

Population (2011)
  - Total: 1,958
- Sex ratio 1004/954 ♂/♀

Languages
  - Official: Punjabi
- Time zone: UTC+5:30 (IST)
- ISO 3166 code: IN-PB
- Vehicle registration: PB- 08
- Website: jalandhar.nic.in

Bajwa Kalan is a village in Shahkot in Jalandhar district of Punjab State, India. Kalan is Persian language word which means Big and Khurd is Persian word which means small when two villages have same name then it is distinguished with Kalan means Big and Khurd means Small used with Village Name. It is located 3 kilometres (1.9 mi) from Shahkot, 21 kilometres (13 mi) from Nakodar, 45 kilometres (28 mi) from district headquarter Jalandhar and 178 kilometres (111 mi) from state capital Chandigarh. The village is administrated by a sarpanch who is an elected representative of village as per Panchayati raj (India).

== Baba Sukhchain Das ==
There is a holy Gurdwara of Baba Sukhchain Das ji, who meditate there. Every year a big event of 3 to 4 days, locally called Mela, held in summers.

== Transport ==
Shahkot Malisian station is the nearest train station. The village is 82 kilometres (51 mi) away from domestic airport in Ludhiana and the nearest international airport is located in Chandigarh also Sri Guru Ram Dass Jee International Airport is the second nearest airport which is 115 kilometres (71 mi) away in Amritsar.
