= Danewal, Punjab =

Danewal
- Village
- Location in Punjab, India Danewal (India)
- Coordinates: 31.0131825°N 75.3752607°E
- Country: India
- State: Punjab
- District: Jalandhar
- Tehsil: Shahkot

Government
  - Type: Panchayat raj
  - Body: Gram panchayat
- Elevation: 240 m (790 ft)

Population (2011)
  - Total: 1,172
- Sex ratio 628/544 ♂/♀

Languages
  - Official: Punjabi
- Time zone: UTC+5:30 (IST)
- ISO 3166 code: IN-PB
- Website: jalandhar.nic.in

Danewal is a village in Shahkot in Jalandhar district of Punjab State, India. It is located 10 kilometres (6.2 mi) from Shahkot, 21 kilometres (13 mi) from Nakodar, 45 kilometres (28 mi) from district headquarter Jalandhar and 171 kilometres (106 mi) from state capital Chandigarh. The village is administrated by a sarpanch who is an elected representative of village as per Panchayati raj (India).

== Transport ==
Shahkot Malisian station is the nearest train station. The village is 81 kilometres (50 mi) away from domestic airport in Ludhiana and the nearest international airport is located in Chandigarh also Sri Guru Ram Dass Jee International Airport is the second nearest airport which is 122 kilometres (76 mi) away in Amritsar.
