= Mirzapur, Punjab =

Mirzapur
- Village
- Location in Punjab, India Mirzapur (India)
- Coordinates: 31.0461381°N 75.2072302°E
- Country: India
- State: Punjab
- District: Jalandhar
- Tehsil: Shahkot

Government
  - Type: Panchayat raj
  - Body: Gram panchayat
- Elevation: 240 m (790 ft)

Population (2011)
  - Total: 70
- Sex ratio 37/33 ♂/♀

Languages
  - Official: Punjabi
- Time zone: UTC+5:30 (IST)
- ISO 3166 code: IN-PB
- Vehicle registration: PB- 08
- Website: jalandhar.nic.in

Mirzapur is a village in Shahkot in Jalandhar district of Punjab State, India. It is located 16 kilometres (9.9 mi) from Shahkot, 35 kilometres (22 mi) from Nakodar, 57 kilometres (35 mi) from district headquarter Jalandhar and 187 kilometres (116 mi) from state capital Chandigarh. The village is administrated by a sarpanch who is an elected representative of village as per Panchayati raj (India).

== Transport ==
Shahkot Malisian station is the nearest train station. The village is 97 kilometres (60 mi) away from domestic airport in Ludhiana and the nearest international airport is located in Chandigarh also Sri Guru Ram Dass Jee International Airport is the second nearest airport which is 109 kilometres (68 mi) away in Amritsar.
