= Sadakpur =

- Village
- Country: India
- State: Punjab
- District: Jalandhar

Languages
  - Official: Punjabi
- Time zone: UTC+5:30 (IST)

Sadakpur or Sadiqpur is a village in Shahkot, a city in the district Jalandhar of Indian state of Punjab.

== Transportation ==
Sadakpur lies on the Nakodar-Shahkot road. The nearest railway station is Shahkot railway station at a distance of 6 km.

== Post office ==
Sadakpur's post office is Dhandewal.
