= Raiwal Dona =

- Village
- Location in Punjab, India Raiwal Dona (India)
- Coordinates: 31.1799381°N 75.3064001°E
- Country: India
- State: Punjab
- District: Jalandhar
- Tehsil: Shahkot

Government
  - Type: Panchayat raj
  - Body: Gram panchayat
- Elevation: 240 m (790 ft)

Population (2011)
  - Total: 612
- Sex ratio 305/307 ♂/♀

Languages
  - Official: Punjabi
- Time zone: UTC+5:30 (IST)
- ISO 3166 code: IN-PB
- Vehicle registration: PB- 08
- Website: jalandhar.nic.in

Raiwal Dona is a village in Shahkot in Jalandhar district of Punjab State, India. It is located 15 kilometres (9.3 mi) from Shahkot, 22 kilometres (14 mi) from Nakodar, 33 kilometres (21 mi) from district headquarter Jalandhar and 177 kilometres (110 mi) from state capital Chandigarh. The village is administrated by a sarpanch who is an elected representative of village as per Panchayati raj (India).

== Transport ==
Shahkot Malisian station is the nearest train station. The village is 84 kilometres (52 mi) away from domestic airport in Ludhiana and the nearest international airport is located in Chandigarh also Sri Guru Ram Dass Jee International Airport is the second nearest airport which is 104 kilometres (65 mi) away in Amritsar.
