= Mala, Punjab =

Mala
- Village
- Location in Punjab, India Mala (India)
- Coordinates: 31.1787955°N 75.2806653°E
- Country: India
- State: Punjab
- District: Jalandhar
- Tehsil: Shahkot

Government
  - Type: Panchayat raj
  - Body: Gram panchayat
- Elevation: 240 m (790 ft)

Population (2011)
  - Total: 472
- Sex ratio 243/229 ♂/♀

Languages
  - Official: Punjabi
- Time zone: UTC+5:30 (IST)
- ISO 3166 code: IN-PB
- Vehicle registration: PB- 08
- Website: jalandhar.nic.in

Mala is a village in Shahkot in Jalandhar district of Punjab State, India. It is 15 kilometres (9.3 mi) from Shahkot, 23 kilometres (14 mi) from Nakodar, 34 kilometres (21 mi) from the district headquarters Jalandhar, and 177 kilometres (110 mi) from the state capital Chandigarh. The village is administrated by a sarpanch who is an elected representative of village as per Panchayati raj.

== Transport ==
Shahkot Malisian station is the nearest train station. The village is 184 kilometres (114 mi) away from a domestic airport in Ludhiana, and the nearest international airport is in Chandigarh. Sri Guru Ram Dass Jee International Airport is the second-nearest airport, 100 kilometres (62 mi) away in Amritsar.
