= Pato Khurd =

- Village
- Location in Punjab, India Pato Khurd (India)
- Coordinates: 31.072709°N 75.2633626°E
- Country: India
- State: Punjab
- District: Jalandhar
- Tehsil: Shahkot

Government
  - Type: Panchayat raj
  - Body: Gram panchayat
- Elevation: 240 m (790 ft)

Population (2011)
  - Total: 1,227
- Sex ratio 624/603 ♂/♀

Languages
  - Official: Punjabi
- Time zone: UTC+5:30 (IST)
- ISO 3166 code: IN-PB
- Vehicle registration: PB- 08
- Website: jalandhar.nic.in

Pato Khurd is a village in Shahkot in Jalandhar district of Punjab State, India. It is located 8 kilometres (5.0 mi) from Shahkot, 26 kilometres (16 mi) from Nakodar, 49 kilometres (30 mi) from district headquarter Jalandhar and 181 kilometres (112 mi) from state capital Chandigarh. The village is administrated by a sarpanch who is an elected representative of village as per Panchayati raj (India).

== Transport ==
Shahkot Malisian station is the nearest train station. The village is 87 kilometres (54 mi) away from domestic airport in Ludhiana and the nearest international airport is located in Chandigarh also Sri Guru Ram Dass Jee International Airport is the second nearest airport which is 109 kilometres (68 mi) away in Amritsar.
