= Parjian Kalan =

- Village
- Location in Punjab, India Parjian Kalan (India)
- Coordinates: 31.0224921°N 75.3938377°E
- Country: India
- State: Punjab
- District: Jalandhar
- Tehsil: Shahkot

Government
  - Type: Panchayat raj
  - Body: Gram panchayat
- Elevation: 240 m (790 ft)

Population (2011)
  - Total: 1,569
- Sex ratio 829/740 ♂/♀

Languages
  - Official: Punjabi
- Time zone: UTC+5:30 (IST)
- ISO 3166 code: IN-PB
- Website: jalandhar.nic.in

Parjian Kalan is a village in Shahkot in Jalandhar district of Punjab State, India. Kalan is Persian language word which means Big and Khurd is Persian word which means small when two villages have same name then it is distinguished as Kalan means Big and Khurd means Small with Village Name. It is located 11 kilometres (6.8 mi) from Shahkot, 19 kilometres (12 mi) from Nakodar, 43 kilometres (27 mi) from the district headquarters Jalandhar and 168 kilometres (104 mi) from the state capital Chandigarh. The village is administered by a sarpanch who is an elected representative of village as per Panchayati raj (India).

== Transport ==
Shahkot Malisian station is the nearest train station. The village is 79 kilometres (49 mi) away from domestic airport in Ludhiana and the nearest international airport is located in Chandigarh also Sri Guru Ram Dass Jee International Airport is the second nearest airport which is 123 kilometres (76 mi) away in Amritsar.
