= Sangatpur, Shahkot =

Sangatpur
- Village
- Location in Punjab, India Sangatpur (India)
- Coordinates: 31.0653666°N 75.2998477°E
- Country: India
- State: Punjab
- District: Jalandhar
- Tehsil: Shahkot

Government
  - Type: Panchayat raj
  - Body: Gram panchayat
- Elevation: 240 m (790 ft)

Population (2011)
  - Total: 930
- Sex ratio 457/473 ♂/♀

Languages
  - Official: Punjabi
- Time zone: UTC+5:30 (IST)
- ISO 3166 code: IN-PB
- Vehicle registration: PB- 08
- Website: jalandhar.nic.in

Sangatpur is a village in Shahkot in Jalandhar district of Punjab, India. It is located 5.7 kilometres (3.5 mi) from Shahkot, 24 kilometres (15 mi) from Nakodar, 47.6 kilometres (29.6 mi) from district headquarter Jalandhar and 180 kilometres (110 mi) from state capital Chandigarh. The village is administrated by a sarpanch who is an elected representative of village as per Panchayati raj (India).

== Demography ==
As of 2011, Qadian has 73 houses and a population of 308, of which 169 are males and 139 are females, according to the report published by the Census of India in 2011. The literacy rate of the village is 70.18%, lower than state average of 75.84%. The population of children under the age of 6 years is 33 which is 10.71% of total population of the village, and child sex ratio is approximately 500 lower than state average of 846.

Most of the people are from Schedule Caste, constituting 18.83% of total population in the village. The town does not have any Schedule Tribe population so far.

As per the 2011 census, 124 people, of which 100 were males and 24 were females, were engaged in work activities. According to the 2011 census survey report, 85.48% of workers describe their work as main work while the other 14.52% of workers are involved in marginal activity providing livelihood for less than 6 months.

== Transport ==
Shahkot Malisian station is the nearest train station. The village is 85 kilometres (53 mi) away from the domestic airport in Ludhiana. The nearest international airport is located in Chandigarh. Sri Guru Ram Dass Jee International Airport is the second nearest airport, 117 kilometres (73 mi) away in Amritsar.

== See also ==
- List of villages in India
