= Nihaluwal =

- Village
- Location in Punjab, India Nihaluwal (India)
- Coordinates: 31.1460395°N 75.2828451°E
- Country: India
- State: Punjab
- District: Jalandhar
- Tehsil: Shahkot

Government
  - Type: Panchayat raj
  - Body: Gram panchayat
- Elevation: 240 m (790 ft)

Population (2011)
  - Total: 1,433
- Sex ratio 746/687 ♂/♀

Languages
  - Official: Punjabi
- Time zone: UTC+5:30 (IST)
- ISO 3166 code: IN-PB
- Vehicle registration: PB- 08
- Website: jalandhar.nic.in

Nihaluwal is a village in Shahkot in Jalandhar district of Punjab State, India. It is located 13 kilometres (8.1 mi) from Shahkot, 21 kilometres (13 mi) from Nakodar, 46 kilometres (29 mi) from district headquarter Jalandhar and 176 kilometres (109 mi) from state capital Chandigarh. The village is administrated by a sarpanch who is an elected representative of village as per Panchayati raj (India).

== Population ==
According to a 2011 census report Nihaluwal has 279 households with a total population of 1433 persons of which 746 are male and 687 are female. The total population of children in the age group 0-6 is 54.

== Transport ==
Shahkot Malisian station is the nearest train station. The village is 82 kilometres (51 mi) away from domestic airport in Ludhiana and the nearest international airport is located in Chandigarh also Sri Guru Ram Dass Jee International Airport is the second nearest airport which is 105 kilometres (65 mi) away in Amritsar.
