= Chak Yusafpur Allewal =

- Village
- Location in Punjab, India Chak Yusafpur Allewal (India)
- Coordinates: 31°09′10″N 75°05′29″E
- Country: India
- State: Punjab
- District: Jalandhar
- Tehsil: Shahkot

Government
  - Type: Panchayat raj
  - Body: Gram panchayat
- Elevation: 240 m (790 ft)

Population (2011)
  - Total: 297
- Sex ratio 149/148 ♂/♀

Languages
  - Official: Punjabi
- Time zone: UTC+5:30 (IST)
- ISO 3166 code: IN-PB
- Vehicle registration: PB- 08
- Website: jalandhar.nic.in

Chak Yusafpur Allewal or Chak Yusafpur Allew is a village in Shahkot in Jalandhar district of Punjab State, India. It is located 33 kilometres (21 mi) from Shahkot, 41 kilometres (25 mi) from Nakodar, 54 kilometres (34 mi) from the district headquarters, Jalandhar, and 197 kilometres (122 mi) from the state capital Chandigarh. The village is administrated by a sarpanch, an elected representative under the Panchayati Raj system (India).

== Transport ==
Shahkot Malisian is the nearest train station. The village is 102 kilometres (63 mi) away from the domestic airport in Ludhiana. The nearest international airport is located in Chandigarh, while the second nearest airport is Sri Guru Ram Dass Jee International Airport in Amritsar, 95.6 kilometres (59.4 mi) away
