= Kanian Khurd =

- Village
- Location in Punjab, India Kanian Khurd (India)
- Coordinates: 31.0491181°N 75.3469702°E
- Country: India
- State: Punjab
- District: Jalandhar
- Tehsil: Shahkot

Government
  - Type: Panchayat raj
  - Body: Gram panchayat
- Elevation: 240 m (790 ft)

Population (2011)
  - Total: 562
- Sex ratio 285/277 ♂/♀

Languages
  - Official: Punjabi
- Time zone: UTC+5:30 (IST)
- ISO 3166 code: IN-PB
- Vehicle registration: PB- 08
- Website: jalandhar.nic.in

Kanian Khurd is a village in Shahkot, Jalandhar district, Punjab State, India. Kalan is a Persian word meaning "big," while Khurd means "small." When two villages share the same name, they are distinguished as Kalan (big) and Khurd (small), appended with the village name. It is located 5 kilometres (3.1 mi) from Shahkot, 17 kilometres (11 mi) from Nakodar, 44 kilometres (27 mi) from the district headquarters in Jalandhar, and 174 kilometres (108 mi) from the state capital, Chandigarh. The village is administrated by a sarpanch, who is an elected representative of village according to the Panchayati raj (India).

== Transport ==
Shahkot Malisian station is the nearest train station. The village is 85 kilometres (53 mi) away from the domestic airport in Ludhiana. The nearest international airport is located in Chandigarh, and Sri Guru Ram Dass Jee International Airport is the second nearest airport, situated 120 kilometres (75 mi) away in Amritsar.
