= Gatti Pir Bakhsh =

- Village
- Location in Punjab, India Gatti Pir Bakhsh (India)
- Coordinates: 31.091578°N 75.1849452°E
- Country: India
- State: Punjab
- District: Jalandhar
- Tehsil: Shahkot

Government
  - Type: Panchayat raj
  - Body: Gram panchayat
- Elevation: 240 m (790 ft)

Population (2011)
  - Total: 315
- Sex ratio 171/144 ♂/♀

Languages
  - Official: Punjabi
- Time zone: UTC+5:30 (IST)
- ISO 3166 code: IN-PB
- Vehicle registration: PB- 08
- Website: jalandhar.nic.in

Gatti Pir Bakhsh is a village in Shahkot in the Jalandhar district of Punjab State, India. It is located 16.4 kilometres (10.2 mi) from Shahkot, 38 kilometres (24 mi) from Nakodar, 51.6 kilometres (32.1 mi) from the district headquarters Jalandhar, and 193 kilometres (120 mi) from the state capital Chandigarh. The village is administered by a sarpanch who is an elected representative of the village as per Panchayati raj (India).

== Transport ==
Shahkot Malisian station is the nearest train station. The village is 99 kilometres (62 mi) away from the domestic airport in Ludhiana. The nearest international airport is located in Chandigarh. Sri Guru Ram Dass Jee International Airport is the second nearest airport, 103 kilometres (64 mi) away in Amritsar.
