= Gadaipur, Punjab =

Gadaipur
- Village
- Location in Punjab, India Gadaipur (India)
- Coordinates: 31.0535905°N 75.1842262°E
- Country: India
- State: Punjab
- District: Jalandhar
- Tehsil: Shahkot

Government
  - Type: Panchayat raj
  - Body: Gram panchayat
- Elevation: 240 m (790 ft)

Population (2011)
  - Total: 102
- Sex ratio 54/48 ♂/♀

Languages
  - Official: Punjabi
- Time zone: UTC+5:30 (IST)
- ISO 3166 code: IN-PB
- Vehicle registration: PB- 08
- Website: jalandhar.nic.in

Gadaipur is a village in Shahkot in Jalandhar district of Punjab State, India. It is located 18.7 kilometres (11.6 mi) from Shahkot, 37 kilometres (23 mi) from Nakodar, 56 kilometres (35 mi) from district headquarter Jalandhar and 189 kilometres (117 mi) from state capital Chandigarh. The village is administrated by a sarpanch who is an elected representative of village as per Panchayati raj (India).

== Transport ==
Shahkot Malisian station is the nearest train station. The village is 99 kilometres (62 mi) away from domestic airport in Ludhiana and the nearest international airport is located in Chandigarh also Sri Guru Ram Dass Jee International Airport is the second nearest airport which is 108 kilometres (67 mi) away in Amritsar.
