= Talwandi Madho =

- Village
- Location in Punjab, India Talwandi Madho (India)
- Coordinates: 31.2001837°N 75.3077602°E
- Country: India
- State: Punjab
- District: Jalandhar
- Tehsil: Shahkot

Government
  - Type: Panchayat raj
  - Body: Gram panchayat
- Elevation: 240 m (790 ft)

Population (2011)
  - Total: 1,574
- Sex ratio 798/776 ♂/♀

Languages
  - Official: Punjabi
- Time zone: UTC+5:30 (IST)
- PIN: 144625
- ISO 3166 code: IN-PB
- Vehicle registration: PB- 08
- Website: jalandhar.nic.in

Talwandi Madho is a village in Nakodar in Jalandhar district of Punjab State, India. It is located 17 kilometres (11 mi) from Nakodar, 23 kilometres (14 mi) from Kapurthala, 31 kilometres (19 mi) from district headquarter Jalandhar and 180 kilometres (110 mi) from state capital Chandigarh. The village is administrated by a sarpanch who is an elected representative of village as per Panchayati raj (India). Lambardar of this village is Sukhpreet Singh (Sukha Lambar)

== Demography ==
As of 2011, the village has a total number of 355 houses and a population of 1574 of which include 798 are males while 776 are females according to the report published by Census India in 2011. The literacy rate of the village is 77.58%, higher than state average of 75.84%. The population of children under the age of 6 years is 178 which is 11.31% of total population of the village, and child sex ratio is approximately 1046 lower than the state average of 846.

Most of the people are from Schedule Caste which constitutes 39.14% of total population in the village. The town does not have any Schedule Tribe population so far.

As per census 2011, 563 people were engaged in work activities out of the total population of the village which includes 451 males and 112 females. According to census survey report 2011, 90.94% workers describe their work as main work and 9.06% workers are involved in marginal activity providing livelihood for less than 6 months.

== Transport ==
Nakodar railway station is the nearest train station. The village is 85 kilometres (53 mi) away from domestic airport in Ludhiana and the nearest international airport is located in Chandigarh also Sri Guru Ram Dass Jee International Airport is the second nearest airport which is 101 kilometres (63 mi) away in Amritsar.

== See also ==
- List of villages in India
