= Gatta Mundi Kasu =

- Village
- Location in Punjab, India Gatta Mundi Kasu (India)
- Coordinates: 31.1122356°N 75.1182554°E
- Country: India
- State: Punjab
- District: Jalandhar
- Tehsil: Shahkot

Government
  - Type: Panchayat raj
  - Body: Gram panchayat
- Elevation: 240 m (790 ft)

Population (2011)
  - Total: 992
- Sex ratio 515/477 ♂/♀

Languages
  - Official: Punjabi
- Time zone: UTC+5:30 (IST)
- ISO 3166 code: IN-PB
- Vehicle registration: PB- 08
- Website: jalandhar.nic.in

Gatta Mundi Kasu is a village in Shahkot in Jalandhar district of Punjab State, India. It is located 34 kilometres (21 mi) from Shahkot, 42 kilometres (26 mi) from Nakodar, 55 kilometres (34 mi) from district headquarter Jalandhar and 196 kilometres (122 mi) from state capital Chandigarh. The village is administrated by a sarpanch who is an elected representative of village as per Panchayati raj (India).

== Transport ==
Shahkot Malisian station is the nearest train station. The village is 103 kilometres (64 mi) away from domestic airport in Ludhiana and the nearest international airport is located in Chandigarh also Sri Guru Ram Dass Jee International Airport is the second nearest airport which is 104 kilometres (65 mi) away in Amritsar.
