= Kasupur =

- Village
- Location in Punjab, India Kasupur (India)
- Coordinates: 31.1320611°N 75.3077495°E
- Country: India
- State: Punjab
- District: Jalandhar
- Tehsil: Shahkot

Government
  - Type: Panchayat raj
  - Body: Gram panchayat
- Elevation: 240 m (790 ft)

Population (2011)
  - Total: 570
- Sex ratio 297/273 ♂/♀

Languages
  - Official: Punjabi
- Time zone: UTC+5:30 (IST)
- ISO 3166 code: IN-PB
- Vehicle registration: PB- 08
- Website: jalandhar.nic.in

Kasupur is a village in Shahkot in Jalandhar district of Punjab State, India. It is located 10.8 kilometres (6.7 mi) from Shahkot, 18.8 kilometres (11.7 mi) from Nakodar, 42.5 kilometres (26.4 mi) from district headquarter Jalandhar and 173 kilometres (107 mi) from state capital Chandigarh. The village is administrated by a sarpanch who is an elected representative of village as per Panchayati raj (India).

== Transport ==
Shahkot Malisian station is the nearest train station. The village is 80 kilometres (50 mi) away from domestic airport in Ludhiana and the nearest international airport is located in Chandigarh also Sri Guru Ram Dass Jee International Airport is the second nearest airport which is 109 kilometres (68 mi) away in Amritsar.
