= Bajwa Khurd =

- Village
- Location in Punjab, India Bajwa Khurd (India)
- Coordinates: 31.0456962°N 75.3122618°E
- Country: India
- State: Punjab
- District: Jalandhar
- Tehsil: Shahkot

Government
  - Type: Panchayat raj
  - Body: Gram panchayat
- Elevation: 240 m (790 ft)

Population (2011)
  - Total: 572
- Sex ratio 309/263 ♂/♀

Languages
  - Official: Punjabi
- Time zone: UTC+5:30 (IST)
- ISO 3166 code: IN-PB
- Vehicle registration: PB- 08
- Website: jalandhar.nic.in

Bajwa Khurd is a village in Shahkot in Jalandhar district of Punjab State, India. "Kalan" is Persian language word which means "big" and "Khurd" is Persian word which means "small". When two villages have same name then they are distinguished with Kalan for "Big" and Khurd for "Small" used with village name.

It is located 5 kilometres (3.1 mi) from Shahkot, 23 kilometres (14 mi) from Nakodar, 45 kilometres (28 mi) from district headquarters Jalandhar and 180 kilometres (110 mi) from the state capital Chandigarh. The village is administrated by a sarpanch who is an elected representative of village as per Panchayati raj (India).

The sarpanch of the village is Kala Sarpanch.

To educate people there is an elementary school.

A fair at Gurdwara Sahib of Bajwa Khurs is celebrated by the villages of Aidalpur and Bajwa Khurd on 26 and 27 May.

== Transport ==
Shahkot Malisian station is the nearest train station. The village is 84 kilometres (52 mi) away from a domestic airport in Ludhiana and the nearest international airport is located in Chandigarh. Sri Guru Ram Dass Jee International Airport is the second nearest airport which is 117 kilometres (73 mi) away in Amritsar.
