= Chawinda, Punjab =

Chawinda
- Village
- Location in Punjab, India Chawinda (India)
- Coordinates: 31.1873165°N 75.3273295°E
- Country: India
- State: Punjab
- District: Jalandhar
- Tehsil: Shahkot

Government
  - Type: Panchayat raj
  - Body: Gram panchayat
- Elevation: 240 m (790 ft)

Population (2011)
  - Total: 145
- Sex ratio 73/72 ♂/♀

Languages
  - Official: Punjabi
- Time zone: UTC+5:30 (IST)
- ISO 3166 code: IN-PB
- Website: jalandhar.nic.in

Chawinda is a village in Shahkot in Jalandhar district of Punjab State, India. It is located 16.4 kilometres (10.2 mi) from Shahkot, 24.4 kilometres (15.2 mi) from Nakodar, 34 kilometres (21 mi) from district headquarter Jalandhar and 180 kilometres (110 mi) from state capital Chandigarh. The village is administrated by a sarpanch who is an elected representative of village as per Panchayati raj (India).

== Transport ==
Shahkot Malisian station is the nearest train station. The village is 85 kilometres (53 mi) away from domestic airport in Ludhiana and the nearest international airport is located in Chandigarh also Sri Guru Ram Dass Jee International Airport is the second nearest airport which is 104 kilometres (65 mi) away in Amritsar.

== Demography ==
As of 2011, the village has a total number of 32 houses and a population of 145 of which 73 are males while 72 are females. According to the report published by Census India in 2011, out of the total population of the village 79 people are from Schedule Caste and the village does not have any Schedule Tribe population so far.
