= Malsian =

- Town
- Location in Punjab, India Malsian (India)
- Coordinates: 31.1292°N 75.3492°E
- Country: India
- State: Punjab
- District: Jalandhar

Languages
  - Official: Punjabi
- Time zone: UTC+5:30 (IST)
- PIN: 144701
- Telephone code: 1821

Malsian is a village in Shahkot in Jalandhar district of Punjab State, India. It is located 5 kilometres (3.1 mi) from sub district headquarter and 38 kilometres (24 mi) from district headquarter. The village is administrated by Sarpanch an elected representative of the village.

== Demography ==
As of 2019, the village has a total number of 2672 houses and a population of 12780 of which 1003 are males while 941 are females. According to the report published by Census India in 2011, out of the total population of the village 789 people are from Schedule Caste and the village does not have any Schedule Tribe population so far.

== See also ==
- Josh Malsiyani
- Arsh Malsiani
- List of villages in India
