= Kohar Kalan =

- Village
- Location in Punjab, India Kohar Kalan (India)
- Coordinates: 31.0925769°N 75.2868296°E
- Country: India
- State: Punjab
- District: Jalandhar
- Tehsil: Shahkot

Government
  - Type: Panchayat raj
  - Body: Gram panchayat
- Elevation: 240 m (790 ft)

Population (2011)
  - Total: 1,354
- Sex ratio 738/616 ♂/♀

Languages
  - Official: Punjabi
- Time zone: UTC+5:30 (IST)
- ISO 3166 code: IN-PB
- Vehicle registration: PB- 67
- Website: jalandhar.nic.in

Kohar Kalan is a village in Shahkot in Jalandhar district of Punjab State, India. Kalan is a Persian language word which means big and Khurd is a Persian word which means small. When two villages have the same name they are distinguished as Kalan big, and Khurd small, with the village name. It is located 5 kilometres (3.1 mi) from Shahkot, 23 kilometres (14 mi) from Nakodar, 47 kilometres (29 mi) from district headquarter Jalandhar and 178 kilometres (111 mi) from state capital Chandigarh. The village is administrated by a sarpanch who is an elected representative of village as per Panchayati raj (India).

== Transport ==
Shahkot Malisian station is the nearest train station. The village is 84 kilometres (52 mi) away from domestic airport in Ludhiana and the nearest international airport is located in Chandigarh also Sri Guru Ram Dass Jee International Airport is the second nearest airport which is 110 kilometres (68 mi) away in Amritsar.
