= Sohal Jagir =

Coordinates: 31°04′N 75°25′E

- Village
- Interactive map of Sohal Jagir
- Country: India
- State: Punjab
- District: Jalandhar

Languages
  - Official: Punjabi
- Time zone: UTC+5:30 (IST)
- PIN
- Vehicle registration: PB- 08

Sohal Jagir is a village in Shahkot. Shahkot is a city in the district Jalandhar of Indian state of Punjab.

== About ==
Shahkot lies on the Pandori-Kharas road which is almost 1 km from it. The nearest railway station to Sohal Jagir is Shahkot railway station at a distance of 6 km.

== Post code ==
Sohal Jagir's Post code is 144703.

== Demographics ==
As of the 2011 India census, Sohal Jagir had a total population of 3,241, of which 1,707 were males and 1,534 were females. The population of children aged 0-6 was 328, which made up 10.12% of the total population of the village. The average sex ratio of the village was 898 females per thousand males, which was lower than the Punjab state average of 895. The child sex ratio for Sohal Jagir as per the census was 837, lower than the Punjab average of 846. As of the 2011 India census, Sohal Jagir had the following demographic characteristics as found in the official census library of India.

- Total population: 3241
- Males: 1707
- Females: 1534
- Child population (ages 0-6): 328
- Percentage of total population: 10.12%
- Sex ratio: 898 females per 1000 males
- This is lower than the Punjab state average of 895
- Child sex ratio: 837 girls per 1000 boys
- This is lower than the Punjab average of 846
- Literacy rate: 78.94%
- Male literacy rate: 83.17%
- Female literacy rate: 74.25%
- The overall literacy rate is higher than the Punjab state average of 75.84%
- Scheduled Castes (SC) population: 1110
- Percentage of total population: 34.25%
- Scheduled Tribes (ST) population: 0
- There were no individuals from Scheduled Tribes recorded in the village
- Total number of households: 638

== Website ==
- https://www.sohaljagir.com/
