= Rampur, Shahkot =

Rampur
- Village
- Rampur
- Location in Punjab, India Rampur (India)
- Coordinates: 31.022173068988696°N 75.34966066946379°E
- Country: India
- State: Punjab
- District: Jalandhar
- Tehsil: Shahkot

Government
  - Type: Panchayat raj
  - Body: Gram panchayat
- Elevation: 240 m (790 ft)

Languages
  - Official: Punjabi
- Time zone: UTC+5:30 (IST)
- ISO 3166 code: IN-PB
- Vehicle registration: PB- 08
- Website: jalandhar.nic.in

Rampur is a village in Shahkot in Jalandhar district of Punjab State, India. It is located 8.8 kilometres (5.5 mi) from Shahkot, 25.6 kilometres (15.9 mi) from Nakodar, 54.6 kilometres (33.9 mi) from district headquarter Jalandhar and 169 kilometres (105 mi) from state capital Chandigarh. The village is administrated by a sarpanch who is an elected representative of village as per Panchayati raj (India). The village have two Gurudwaras and a government primary school.

== Transport ==
Shahkot Malisian station is the nearest train station. The village is 78 kilometres (48 mi) away from domestic airport in Ludhiana and the nearest international airport is located in Chandigarh also Sri Guru Ram Dass Jee International Airport is the second nearest airport which is 145 kilometres (90 mi) away in Amritsar.
