= Giddarpindi =

- village
- Location in Punjab, India Giddarpindi (India)
- Coordinates: 31.116681°N 75.552141°E
- Country: India
- State: Punjab
- District: Jalandhar
- Talukas: Shahkot

Languages
  - Official: Punjabi
  - Regional: Punjabi
- Time zone: UTC+5:30 (IST)
- PIN: 144629
- Telephone code: 01821
- Vehicle registration: PB- 67
- Nearest city: Lohian Khas Sultanpur Lodhi

Giddarpindi (pronounced as Giddadpindi) is a small village in Shahkot. Shahkot is a tehsil in the Jalandhar district of the Indian state of Punjab.

== STD code ==
Giddarpindi's STD code is 01821.
