= Chak Rame =

- Village
- Location in Punjab, India Chak Rame (India)
- Coordinates: 31.044378°N 75.2442552°E
- Country: India
- State: Punjab
- District: Jalandhar
- Tehsil: Shahkot

Government
  - Type: Panchayat raj
  - Body: Gram panchayat
- Elevation: 240 m (790 ft)

Population (2011)
  - Total: 30
- Sex ratio 17/13 ♂/♀

Languages
  - Official: Punjabi
- Time zone: UTC+5:30 (IST)
- ISO 3166 code: IN-PB
- Vehicle registration: PB- 08
- Website: jalandhar.nic.in

Chak Rame is a village in Shahkot in the Jalandhar district of Punjab State, India. It is located 13 kilometres (8.1 mi) from Shahkot, 31 kilometres (19 mi) from Nakodar, 55 kilometres (34 mi) from the district headquarters in Jalandhar and 183 kilometres (114 mi) from the state capital Chandigarh. The village is administrated by a sarpanch who is an elected representative of the village as per Panchayati Raj.

== Transport ==
Shahkot Malisian station is the nearest train station. The village is 95 kilometres (59 mi) away from the domestic airport in Ludhiana and the nearest international airport is located in Chandigarh. Sri Guru Ram Dass Jee International Airport is the second nearest airport which is 111 kilometres (69 mi) away in Amritsar.
