= Kakar Khurd =

- Village
- Location in Punjab, India Kakar Khurd (India)
- Coordinates: 31.1052596°N 75.1977952°E
- Country: India
- State: Punjab
- District: Jalandhar
- Tehsil: Shahkot

Government
  - Type: Panchayat raj
  - Body: Gram panchayat
- Elevation: 240 m (790 ft)

Population (2011)
  - Total: 2
- Sex ratio 0/2 ♂/♀

Languages
  - Official: Punjabi
- Time zone: UTC+5:30 (IST)
- ISO 3166 code: IN-PB
- Vehicle registration: PB- 08
- Website: jalandhar.nic.in

Kakar Khurd is a village in Shahkot in Jalandhar district of Punjab State, India. Kalan is a Persian language word which means big and Khurd is a Persian word which means small. When two villages have the same name they are distinguished as Kalan big, and Khurd small, with the village name. It is located 18.7 kilometres (11.6 mi) from Shahkot, 36 kilometres (22 mi) from Nakodar, 49 kilometres (30 mi) from district headquarter Jalandhar and 190 kilometres (120 mi) from state capital Chandigarh. The village is administrated by a sarpanch who is an elected representative of village as per Panchayati raj (India).

== Transport ==
Shahkot Malisian station is the nearest train station. The village is 97 kilometres (60 mi) away from domestic airport in Ludhiana and the nearest international airport is located in Chandigarh also Sri Guru Ram Dass Jee International Airport is the second nearest airport which is 101 kilometres (63 mi) away in Amritsar.
