= Bara Jagir =

- Village
- Location in Punjab, India Bara Jagir (India)
- Coordinates: 31.1554076°N 75.2669906°E
- Country: India
- State: Punjab
- District: Jalandhar
- Tehsil: Shahkot

Government
  - Type: Panchayat raj
  - Body: Gram panchayat
- Elevation: 240 m (790 ft)

Population (2011)
  - Total: 486
- Sex ratio 232/254 ♂/♀

Languages
  - Official: Punjabi
- Time zone: UTC+5:30 (IST)
- ISO 3166 code: IN-PB
- Vehicle registration: PB- 08
- Website: jalandhar.nic.in

Bara Jagir is a village in Shahkot in Jalandhar district of Punjab State, India. It is located 14 kilometres (8.7 mi) from Shahkot, 22 kilometres (14 mi) from Nakodar, 41 kilometres (25 mi) from district headquarter Jalandhar and 177 kilometres (110 mi) from state capital Chandigarh. The village is administrated by a sarpanch who is an elected representative of village as per Panchayati raj (India).

Bara Jagir is the only village in India which has not conducted any elections to appoint Sarpanch since Independence of India (1947). The villagers use unanimous selection process to appoint a person as Sarpanch. Villagers agree on a single candidate, or other candidates withdraw their nominations, leading to the election of a Sarpanch without a contested vote.

== Transport ==
Shahkot Malsian station is the nearest train station. The village is 81 kilometres (50 mi) away from domestic airport in Ludhiana and the nearest international airport is located in Chandigarh also Sri Guru Ram Dass Jee International Airport is the second nearest airport which is 98.6 kilometres (61.3 mi) away in Amritsar.
