= Shahkot, India =

City and tehsil of Jalandhar district, Punjab, India

Shahkot
- City
- Location in Punjab, India Shahkot (India)
- Coordinates: 31°04′59″N 75°20′12″E
- Country: India
- State: Punjab
- District: Jalandhar

Government
  - Type: Municipal Council

Area
  - Total: 16.27 km^{2} (6.28 sq mi)
- Elevation: 244 m (801 ft)

Population (2013)
  - Total: 16,844
  - Density: 1,035/km^{2} (2,681/sq mi)

Languages
  - Official: Doabi Punjabi
- Time zone: UTC+5:30 (IST)
- PIN: 144702
- Telephone code: 01821
- Vehicle registration: PB67
- Website: www.shahkotcity.com

Shahkot is a small city and one of the five tehsils of Jalandhar district in Punjab, India. Shahkot is situated on Jalandhar-Moga-Barnala-Sirsa National Highway 703 (Old NH 71). Shahkot is administered by the Municipal Committee. About 176 villages belong to Shahkot tehsil.

== Geography ==
Shahkot is located at 31.08°N 75.34°E. The region has an average elevation of 209 metres (688 feet). Shahkot is a subdivision and tehsil of Jalandhar District.

== Demographics ==
As of the 2011 Indian census, Shahkot had a population of 25,449, of which 53% were male and 47% female. The town’s average literacy rate was 83%, higher than the Indian national average of 59.5%; male literacy stood at 85.5% and female literacy at 80.5%. Children under six years of age comprised 12% of the population. Hinduism and Sikhism are the predominant religions, accounting for 60% and 39% of the population respectively, with the remaining 1% practising other faiths. Shahkot lies near the Sutlej River, which divides the Doaba and Malwa regions.

== Shahkot tehsil villages ==
- Bahmanian
- Bajwa Khurd
- Balnau
- Bara Jagir
- Bara Jodhsingh
- Bhando
- Bhoyapur
- Billi Baraich
- Billi Chaharmi
- Billi Chao
- Chak Bundala
- Chak Chela
- Chak Gadaipur
- Chak Hathiana
- Chak Rame
- Chak Yusafpur Allewal
- Chawinda
- Dhadha Daulatpur
- Dharmiwal
- Fakhruwal
- Fatehpur Bhagwan
- Fazalwal
- Gadaipur
- Gatta Mundi Kasu
- Gatti Pir Bakhsh
- Gatti Raipur
- Gehlan
- Giddarpindi
- Haveli
- Ida
- Indowal
- Jakopur Khurd
- Jalalpur Khurd
- Jalanpur Kalan
- Janian Chahal
- Kakar Kalan
- Kakar Khurd
- Kanian Khurd
- Kara Ramsingh
- Kasupur
- Khanpur Rajputan
- Khosa
- Kohar Kalan
- Kotla Heran
- Kotla Surajmal
- Kotha
- Kutbiwal
- Mahmonwal
- Malsian
- Mandala
- Mandi Kalu
- Nangal Ambian
- Poonian
- Sohal Jagir
- Talwandi Madho
