= Sutlej Express =

Overview
- Service type: Express
- Current operator: Northern Railway zone

Route
- Termini: Chandigarh Junction (CDG); Firozpur Cantonment (FZR)
- Stops: 10
- Distance travelled: 236 km (147 mi)
- Average journey time: 5 hours 00 mins
- Service frequency: Daily (Note: Runs seven days in a week for every direction.)
- Train number: 14629/14630

On-board services
- Class: General Unreserved
- Seating arrangements: Yes
- Sleeping arrangements: No
- Catering facilities: No
- Observation facilities: ICF coach
- Entertainment facilities: No
- Baggage facilities: No
- Other facilities: Below the seats

Technical
- Rolling stock: 2
- Track gauge: 1,676 mm (5 ft 6 in)
- Operating speed: 47.20 km/h (29 mph), including halts

The Sutlej Express is an Express train belonging to Northern Railway zone that runs between Firozpur Cantonment and Chandigarh Junction in India. Earlier, it was used to run between Firozpur Cantonment and Ludhiana Junction, Later it was extended up to Chandigarh Junction. It is currently being operated with 14629/14630 train numbers on a daily basis.

== History ==
Before Partition of India in 1947, there was a train named Sutlej Express connecting Samma Satta Junction near Bahawalpur with Ludhiana Junction. The train used to cover 532 kilometres (331 mi) in 10 hours 30 mins time having average speed of 50.67 kilometres per hour (31.48 mph) & travelling via Lodhran, Kasur & Firozpur. But this service was withdrawn after partition of India from 15 August 1947.

== Service ==
The current 14629/14630 Sutlej Express has average speed of 47.20 kilometres per hour (29.33 mph) and covers 236 kilometres (147 mi) in 5 hrs 00 mins.

== Route and halts ==
The important halts of the train are:

- Chandigarh Junction
- SAS Nagar Mohali
- New Morinda Junction
- Ludhiana Junction
- Modelgram
- Mullanpur
- Jagraon
- Nanaksar
- Ajitwal
- Moga
- Talwandi
- Firozpur Cantonment

== Coach composition ==
The train has standard ICF rakes with a maximum speed of 110 km/h. The train consists of 16 coaches:

- 14 General Unreserved
- 2 Seating cum Luggage Rake

== Traction ==
The route is partially electrified yet so both trains are hauled by a Ludhiana Loco Shed-based WDM-3A diesel locomotive from Firozpur to Ludhiana and vice versa.

== Rake sharing ==
The train shares its rake with 14601/14602 Firozpur Cantonment–Shri Ganganagar Express and 54641/54642 Delhi–Firozpur Passenger.

Rake reversal

Train reverses its direction at Ludhiana Junction in vice versa.

== See also ==
- Firozpur Cantonment railway station
- Ludhiana Junction railway station
- Firozpur Cantonment–Shri Ganganagar Express
- Delhi–Firozpur Passenger
- Chandigarh–Firozpur Cantonment Express
