= Firozpur Cantonment–Shri Ganganagar Express =

Train in India

Firozpur Cantonment – Shri Ganganagar Express

Overview
- Service type: Express
- First service: 1 September 2012; 13 years ago
- Current operator: Northern Railway zone

Route
- Termini: Firozpur Cantonment (FZR); Shri Ganganagar Junction (SGNR)
- Stops: 10
- Distance travelled: 189 km (117 mi)
- Average journey time: 4h 10m
- Service frequency: Daily (Note: Runs seven days in a week for every direction.)
- Train number: 14601/14602

On-board services
- Class: General Unreserved
- Seating arrangements: Yes
- Sleeping arrangements: No
- Catering facilities: No
- Observation facilities: ICF coach
- Entertainment facilities: No
- Baggage facilities: No
- Other facilities: Below the seats

Technical
- Rolling stock: 2
- Track gauge: 1,676 mm (5 ft 6 in)
- Operating speed: 44 km/h (27 mph), including halts

The Firozpur Cantonment–Shri Ganganagar Express is an Express train belonging to Northern Railway zone that runs between Firozpur Cantonment and Hanumangarh Junction in India. Earlier it was used to run between Firozpur Cantonment and Shri Ganganagar Junction.I t is currently being operated with 14601/14602 train numbers on a weekly basis.

== Service ==
The 14601/Firozpur Cantt–Shri Ganganagar Express has an average speed of 44 km/h and covers 189 km in 4h 10m. The 14602/Shri Ganganagar–Firozpur Cantt Express has an average speed of 42 km/h and covers 189 km in 4h 25m.

== Route and halts ==
The important halts of the train are:

- Firozpur Cantonment
- Firozpur City
- Guru Harsahai
- Jalalabad
- Ladhuka
- Fazilka Junction
- Khui Khera
- Chuhriwala Dhanna
- Abohar Junction
- Shri Ganganagar Junction
- Sadulshahr
- Hanumangarh Junction

== Coach composition ==
The train has standard ICF rakes with max speed of 110 kmph. The train consists of 16 coaches:

- 14 General Unreserved
- 2 Seating cum Luggage Rake

== Traction ==
Both trains are hauled by a Ludhiana Loco Shed-based WDM-3A diesel locomotive from Firozpur to Hanumangarh and vice versa.

== Rake sharing ==
The train shares its rake with 14629/14630 Sutlej Express and 54641/54642 Delhi–Firozpur Passenger.

== See also ==
- Firozpur Cantonment railway station
- Shri Ganganagar Junction railway station
- Sutlej Express
- Delhi–Firozpur Passenger
