= Chandigarh–Firozpur Cantonment Express =

Train in India

Overview
- Service type: Express
- First service: 9 February 2015; 11 years ago
- Current operator: Northern Railway zone

Route
- Termini: Chandigarh Junction (CDG); Firozpur Cantonment (FZR)
- Stops: 6
- Distance travelled: 236 km (147 mi)
- Average journey time: 5h 0m
- Service frequency: Daily (Note: Runs seven days in a week for every direction.)
- Train number: 14613/14614

On-board services
- Class: General Unreserved
- Seating arrangements: Yes
- Sleeping arrangements: No
- Catering facilities: No
- Observation facilities: ICF coach
- Entertainment facilities: No
- Baggage facilities: No
- Other facilities: Below the seats

Technical
- Rolling stock: 2
- Track gauge: 1,676 mm (5 ft 6 in)
- Operating speed: 47 km/h (29 mph), including halts

The Chandigarh–Firozpur Cantonment Express is an Express train belonging to Northern Railway zone that runs between Firozpur Cantonment and Chandigarh Junction in India. It is currently being operated with 14613/14614 train numbers on a daily basis.

== Service ==
The 14613/Chandigarh–Firozpur Express has an average speed of 47 km/h and covers 236 km in 5h. The 14614/Firozpur–Chandigarh Express has an average speed of 50 km/h and covers 236 km in 4h 45m.

== Route and halts ==
The important halts of the train are:

- Chandigarh Junction
- SAS Nagar Mohali
- Samrala
- Ludhiana Junction
- Jagraon
- Moga
- Talwandi
- Firozpur Cantonment

== Coach composition ==
The train has standard ICF rakes with max speed of 110 km/h. The train consists of 16 coaches:

- 14 General Unreserved
- 2 Seating cum Luggage Rake

== Traction ==
Both trains are hauled by a Ludhiana Loco Shed based WDM-3A diesel locomotive from Firozpur to Chandigarh and vice versa.

== Direction reversal ==
The train reverses its direction 1 times:

- Ludhiana Junction

== See also ==
- Firozpur Cantonment railway station
- Chandigarh Junction railway station
- Sutlej Express
- Delhi–Firozpur Passenger
