= Hazur Sahib Nanded–Firozpur Cantt Weekly Express =

Train in India

Hazur Sahib Nanded - Firozpur Cantt Weekly Express

Overview
- Service type: Express
- Status: Active
- Locale: Maharashtra, Madhya Pradesh, Uttar Pradesh, New Delhi, Haryana and Punjab
- First service: 15 June 2025; 10 months ago
- Current operator: Northern Railway (NR)

Route
- Termini: Hazur Sahib Nanded (NED); Firozpur Cantt (FZR)
- Stops: 31
- Distance travelled: 2,023 km (1,257 mi)
- Average journey time: 40h 50m
- Service frequency: Weekly
- Train number: 14621 / 14622

On-board services
- Classes: General Unreserved, Sleeper Class, AC 2nd Class, AC 3rd Class
- Seating arrangements: Yes
- Sleeping arrangements: Yes
- Catering facilities: No
- Observation facilities: Large windows
- Baggage facilities: No
- Other facilities: Below the seats

Technical
- Rolling stock: LHB coach
- Track gauge: 1,676 mm (5 ft 6 in)
- Electrification: 25 kV 50 Hz AC overhead line
- Operating speed: 130 km/h (81 mph) maximum, 50 km/h (31 mph) average including halts.
- Track owner: Indian Railways

The 14621 / 14622 Hazur Sahib Nanded–Firozpur Cantt Weekly Express is an Express train belonging to Northern Railway zone that runs between the city Hazur Sahib Nanded of Maharashtra and Firozpur Cantt of Punjab in India.

It operates as train number 14621 from Hazur Sahib Nanded to Firozpur Cantt and as train number 14622 in the reverse direction, serving the states of Maharashtra, Madhya Pradesh, Uttar Pradesh, New Delhi, Haryana and Punjab.

== Services ==
- 14621/ Hazur Sahib Nanded–Firozpur Cantt Express has an average speed of 50 km/h and covers 2023 km in 40h 50m.
- 14622/ Firozpur Cantt–Hazur Sahib Nanded Express has an average speed of 53 km/h and covers 2023 km in 38h 5m.

== Routes and halts ==
The Important Halts of the train are:

- Hazur Sahib Nanded
- Purna Junction
- Parbhani Junction
- Selu
- Jalna
- Chhatrapati Sambhajinagar
- Manmad Junction
- Bhusaval Junction
- Khandwa Junction
- Itarsi Junction
- Bhopal Junction
- Vidisha
- Bina Junction
- Veerangana Laxmibai Junction
- Gwalior Junction
- Agra Cantt
- Mathura Junction
- Faridabad
- Tughlakabad
- Delhi Safdarjung
- Shakur Basti
- Bahadurgarh
- Rohtak Junction
- Jind Junction
- Dhamtan Sahib
- Jakhal Junction
- Mansa
- Bathinda Junction
- Kot Kapura Junction
- Faridkot
- Firozpur Cantt

== Schedule ==
- 14621 - 11:50 AM (Sunday) [Hazur Sahib Nanded]
- 14622 - 1:25 PM (Friday) [Firozpur Cantt]

== Traction ==
As the entire route is full electrified, it is hauled by a Ludhiana Loco Shed-based WAP-7 electric locomotive from Hazur Sahib Nanded to Firozpur Cantt and vice versa.

== Rake share ==
The train will Rake Sharing with Haridwar–Firozpur Cantt Express (14625/14626).

== See also ==
Trains from Hazur Sahib Nanded:

1. Hazur Sahib Nanded–Mumbai CSMT Vande Bharat Express
2. Hazur Sahib Nanded–Jammu Tawi Humsafar Express
3. Hazur Sahib Nanded–Amritsar Superfast Express
4. KSR Bengaluru–Hazur Sahib Nanded Express
5. Tapovan Express

Trains from Firozpur Cantt:

1. Firozpur Cantonment–Shri Ganganagar Express
2. Patalkot Express
3. New Delhi–Firozpur Shatabdi Express
4. Bathinda–Jammu Tawi Express (via Firozpur)
5. Firozpur–Rameswaram Humsafar Express

== Notes ==
a. Runs 1 day in a week with both directions.
