= Hazipur =

Hazipur may refer to:

== Places and locations ==
- Hajipur, a city in Vaishali district, Bihar, India
- Hazipur, Alwar, a village in Alwar district, Rajasthan, India
- Hazipur, Sultanpur Lodhi, a village in Kapurthala district, Punjab, India
