= Kakar Kalan =

- Village
- Location in Punjab, India Kakar Kalan (India)
- Coordinates: 31.1032797°N 75.2189844°E
- Country: India
- State: Punjab
- District: Jalandhar
- Tehsil: Shahkot

Government
  - Type: Panchayat raj
  - Body: Gram panchayat
- Elevation: 240 m (790 ft)

Population (2011)
  - Total: 1,135
- Sex ratio 570/565 ♂/♀

Languages
  - Official: Punjabi
- Time zone: UTC+5:30 (IST)
- ISO 3166 code: IN-PB
- Vehicle registration: PB- 08
- Website: jalandhar.nic.in

Kakar Kalan is a village in Shahkot tehsil in Jalandhar district of Punjab State, India. It is located 7.8 kilometres (4.8 mi) from Lohian Khas, 13.9 kilometres (8.6 mi) from Shahkot, 30.8 kilometres (19.1 mi) from Nakodar, 51.4 kilometres (31.9 mi) from district headquarter Jalandhar via Lohian Khas and 132 kilometres (82 mi) from state capital Chandigarh. The village is administrated by a sarpanch who is an elected representative of village as per Panchayati raj (India).

== Transport ==
Lohian Khas Junction station is the nearest train station. The village is 98.1 kilometres (61.0 mi) away from domestic airport in Ludhiana and Sri Guru Ram Dass Jee International Airport in Amritsar is the nearest international airport which is 117 kilometres (73 mi) away. The second nearest international airport is Shaheed Bhagat Singh International Airport, located near Chandigarh, which is 199 kilometres (124 mi) away.
