= Fazilka Junction railway station =

Railway station in Punjab, India

Fazilka Junction
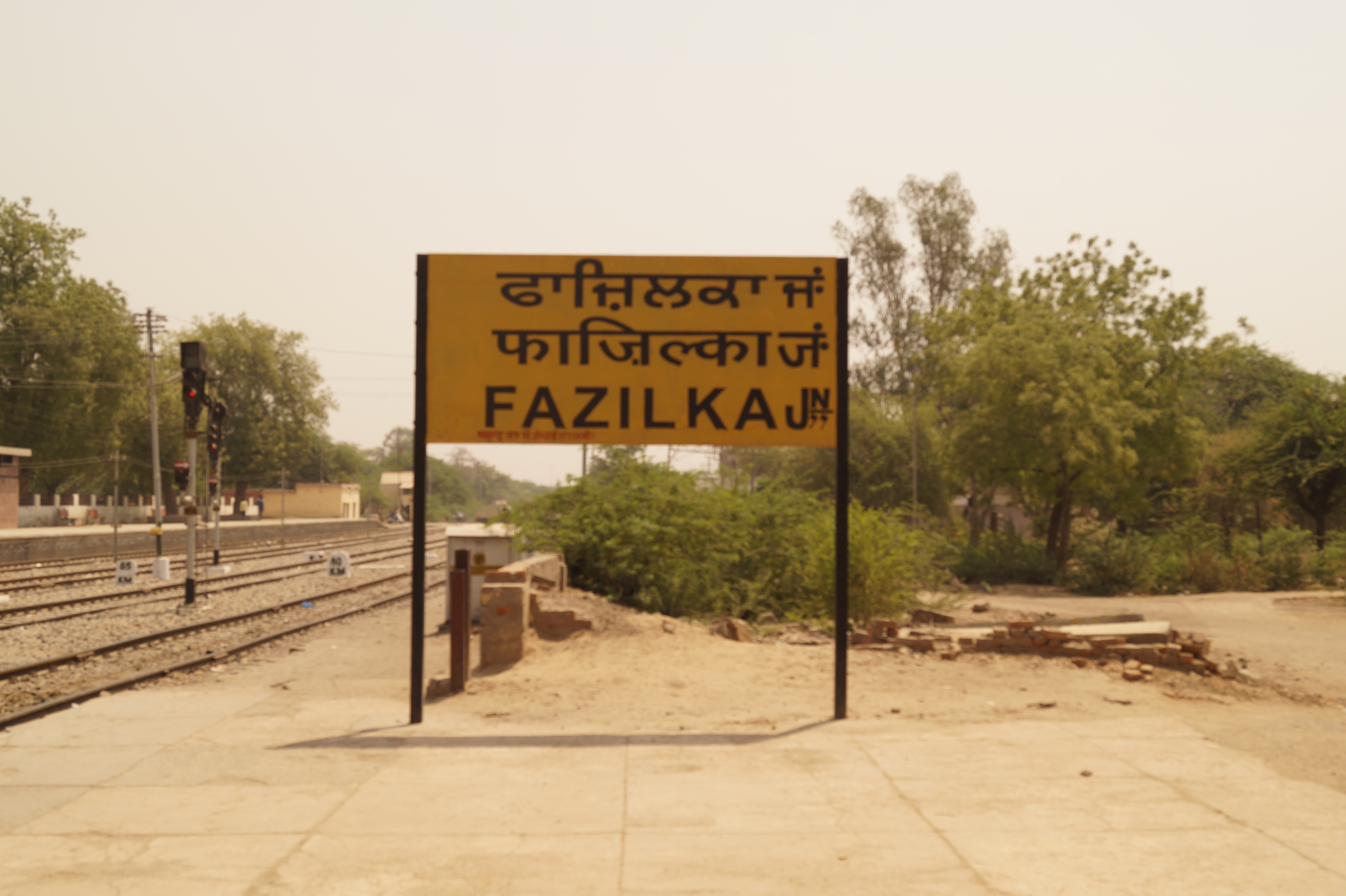

General information
- Location: Cycle Market Road, Fazilka, Punjab; India
- Coordinates: 30°24′32″N 74°01′30″E
- Elevation: 181 metres (594 ft)
- System: Indian Railways junction station
- Owner: Indian Railways
- Operator: Northern Railway
- Lines: Ludhiana–Firozpur–Fazilka line, Abohar–Fazilka line, Fazilka–Abohar–Sri Ganganagar line, Sri Ganganagar–Abohar–Bathinda line
- Platforms: 2
- Tracks: 5 ft 6 in (1,676 mm) broad gauge

Construction
- Structure type: Standard on ground
- Parking: Yes
- Cycle facilities: No

Other information
- Status: Functioning
- Station code: FKA
- Division(s): Firozpur

History
- Opened: 1897

Services
Preceding station	Indian Railways	Following station
Theh Qalandar towards ?	Northern Railway zone Ludhiana–Fazilka line	Terminus
Chak Banwala towards ?	Northern Railway zone Delhi–Fazilka line	Terminus
Terminus	Northern Railway zone Fazilka–Abohar line	Jhandwala Kharta towards ?
Location
- Location within Punjab

Fazilka Junction is located in Fazilka district in the Indian state of Punjab and serves Fazilka.

== The railway station ==
Fazilka railway station is at an elevation of 181 metres (594 ft) and was assigned the code – FKA.

== History before Partition ==
The Southern Punjab Railway Co. opened the Delhi–Bhatinda–Fazilka-Bahawalpur-Samma Satta railway line in 1897. The line passed through Rohtak, Jind, Narwana, Bhatinda, Kot Kapura, Muktasar, Fazilka, Amruka & Bahawalnagar and provided direct connection through Samma Satta (now in Pakistan) to Karachi. The extension from the Macleodganj Junction (later renamed Mandi Sadiqganj Junction and now in Pakistan) railway line to Ambala via Hindumalkote, Abohar, Bhatinda, Patiala was opened by the same company in 1902.

The Southern Punjab Railway Expansion (1905–1906) The critical link between Ferozepore and Fazilka was conceptualized as part of the Southern Punjab Railway (SPR) company's "Ludhiana Extension." Unlike the earlier metre-gauge tracks, this was built as a Broad Gauge (1,676 mm) line to create a high-capacity "Sutlej Valley" corridor.

Ludhiana–Ferozepore Section: Opened in 1905, covering 77 miles (124 km).  
Ferozepore–McLeod Ganj Section: Opened in 1906, covering 75 miles (120 km) and passing through Jalalabad and Fazilka.  

This construction transformed Fazilka into a unique "break-of-gauge" junction, where goods were transshipped between the metre-gauge wagons from the south and the broad-gauge wagons heading toward the Northwest.

The historical Bahawalpur Express train used to run from Delhi to Bahawalpur via Bhatinda, Fazilka & Samma Satta before partition, covering 726 kilometres (451 mi) in 14 hrs 30 mins time. Pre-1947 era Timings of Delhi-Samma Satta were as follows. 144 Down Bahawalpur Express used to depart Delhi at 15.25 hrs. Then going through Rohtak 16.44 hrs; Jind 17.42 hrs; Bhatinda 21.05 hrs; Fazilka 23.30 hrs; Amruka 23.59 hrs; McLeodganj 00.40 hrs; Bahawalnagar 01.45 hrs; Samma Satta 05.40 hrs(reversal); arriving Bahawalpur at 05.55 hrs next day. 143 Up Bahawalpur Express used to depart Bahawalpur at 19.00 hrs, then reversing at Samma Satta around 19.35 hrs, the train going via Fazilka at 01.30 hrs; Bhatinda at 04.00 hrs & used to reach Delhi at 09.30 hrs next day. The train now runs from Samma Satta to Narowal Junction via Bahawalpur-Lodhran-Multan-Khanewal-Lahore route through Pakistan post partition in 1947.

== Post Partition ==
Post partition Fazilka lost rail connection to Delhi & only trains to Bhatinda used to run. The 81 km (50 mi) long Fazilka-Firozpur(Firozepur/Ferozpur) railway line was destroyed in 1965 & 1971 wars against Pakistan. Ultimately in 1972, 88.5 km (55 mi) long Fazilka-Firozpur rail line was re-constructed. Meanwhile on 1965, the Fazilka-Amruka 22.5 km (14 mi) line via Chananwala border & Fazilka-Hindumalkot 45.5 km (28 mi) line via Kabulshah was dismantled. While Fazilka-Chananwala-Amruka line was dismantled for stopping Pakistan Army in 1965 war, Fazilka-Hindumalkot line was dismantled after Pakistan Air Force mistakenly bombed a passenger train, killing 100+ passengers during 1965 war. The link between Fazilka & Abohar stayed unavailable until 2010. Fazilka-Abohar new line project was announced in 2010 & the 43.65 km (27 mi) new 5 ft 6 in (1,676 mm) broad gauge line between Fazilka and Abohar was opened in 2012. But as of today, only 6 Mail/Express trains operate from Fazilka. Sadly, Indian railways is not introducing new trains from Fazilka & via Fazilka.
