= Dumbleton (surname) =

Dumbleton is a surname, and may refer to:

- Horatio Norris Dumbleton (1858–1935), English cricketer and officer in the Royal Engineers
- John Dumbleton (c. 1310 – c. 1349), English philosopher
- Lionel Jack Dumbleton (1905–1976), New Zealand entomologist
