= Southern Punjab Railway =

- Industry: Railways
- Founded: 1895
- Defunct: 1930
- Headquarters: Bathinda, British India
- Area served: Malerkotla State, Jind State, Patiala State & Nabha State
- Services: Rail transport

The Southern Punjab Railway (SPR) was a 1,676 mm (5 ft 6 in) broad-gauge railway built to provide a more direct connection from Karachi to Delhi by linking to the original Indus Valley State Railway at Samasata and avoiding the North Western Railway loop via Lahore.

== History ==
The Southern Punjab Railway Company was formed in 1895 with Bradford Leslie as Chairman. Under contract with the Secretary of State for India, Leslie and his partners formed the company to build a BG railway from Delhi to Samasata about 400 miles to the west. Horace Bell was the consulting engineer for SPR in London for the construction.

The main line ran northwest from Delhi to Bathinda then southwest through Bahawalpur State to Samasata, a total distance of 402 miles (643 km). Several extension lines (Jullunder, Sutlej Valley etc.) extended the length to 502 miles(803 km) in 1905. In 1873, metre-gauge Delhi–Rewari line from the Delhi–Rewari section of Rajputana–Malwa Railway was extended to Hisar, and then to Bhatinda in 1883–84, connecting it all the way to Karachi via Delhi–Karachi line.

The railway was worked by the North Western State (NWR) Railway (see "Records L/AG/46/34"). The railway eventually became part of Indian Railways.

== Network ==
The listings below are generally based on the "Administration Report on Railways 1918" with page numbers (and pdf pages) noted at the end of each entry.

Mainline and branches BG Total line length 426 miles (685 km). Page 121 (pdf 130)

- Delhi–Samasata main line, Delhi via Narwana, Jakhal, Bathinda to Samasata, opened 1897, 399 miles (642 km)
  - Delhi Brewery branch line, opened 1909, 0.8 mile (1.3 km)
  - Narwana-Kaithal branch line, opened 1899, from Narwana to Kaithal, 23 miles (37 km)
  - Jind City branch line, from Jhind Junction to Jhind City, opened 1916, 2.5 miles (4 km)

Jullundur–Doab Extension Railway BG Total line length 130 miles (209 km). Page 123 (pdf132)

- Jullunder–Ferozepore Mainline, Jullunder via Karpurthala, Sultanpur Lodi, Lohian Khas, Gidarpind, Makhu to Ferozepore Cantonment, opened 1912–14, 73 miles (117 km)
  - ’Phillaur branch line’, Lohian Khas to Phillaur, opened 1913, 39 miles (63 km)
  - ’Jullundur–Nakodar Chord Railway' known as the ‘Nakodar branch line’, Jullunder to Nakodar, opened 1914, 19 miles (30 km)

Ludhiana Extension Railway BG Total line length 152 miles (244 km). Page 123(pdf132)

- Ludhiana-Ferozepore line, Ludhiana to Ferozepore, opened 1905, 77 miles (124 km)
- Ferozepore–MacLeod Ganj line, Ferozepore to McLeod Ganj (a suburb of Dharamsala), opened 1906, 75 miles (120 km)

Sutlej Valley Extension Railway BG Total line length 208 miles (335 km). Pages 124-5 (pdf135-6)

- Kasur-Lodhran Railway, Kasur to Lodhran, opened 1910, closed and dismantled 1917–18, 208 miles (335 km)

Ludhiana–Dhuri–Jakhal Railway BG Total line length 79 miles (127 km). Page 115 (pdf124)

- Ludhiana via Dhuri to Jakhal, opened 1901. Managed, maintained and worked by North Western Railway (NWR) under an Agreement with the Princely Maler Kotla State Durbar and the Jhind State Durbars. The line was used by SPR linking the Delhi–Samasata Mainline at Jakhal with 'Ludhiana Extension Railway' at Ludhiana.
