= New Delhi–Firozpur Shatabdi Express =

Indian Railway's New Delhi-Firozpur Shatabdi Express

Overview
- Service type: Superfast Express, Shatabdi Express
- First service: 18 December 2014 as Bathinda Shatabdi Express
- Current operator: Northern Railways

Route
- Termini: New Delhi; Firozpur Cantonment Junction
- Distance travelled: 386.5 km (240 mi)
- Average journey time: 04 hours 45 minutes as 12037 New Delhi Ludhiana Shatabdi Express, 06 hours 25 minutes as 12038 Bathinda New Delhi Shatabdi Express
- Service frequency: 2 days a week on Monday & Friday
- Train number: 12047 / 12012048

On-board services
- Classes: Executive Class, AC Chair Car
- Seating arrangements: Yes
- Sleeping arrangements: No
- Catering facilities: Yes
- Observation facilities: Large windows
- Baggage facilities: Overhead racks

Technical
- Rolling stock: Standard Indian Railways Shatabdi coaches
- Track gauge: 1,676 mm (5 ft 6 in)
- Operating speed: 105 km/h (65 mph) maximum, 64.27 km/h (40 mph), including halts

The New Delhi–Firozpur Shatabdi Express was a Shatabdi class train operated by Indian Railways, running between from New Delhi to Firozpur.

It operates as train number 12047 from New Delhi to Firozpur and as train number 12048 in the reverse direction serving the states of Delhi, Haryana and Punjab.

The train used to run as New Delhi Bhatinda Shatabdi. But since 7 October 2016 it has extended up to Firozpur.

The train would run twice a week, on Monday and Friday, at 4AM from Firozpur, and would return from New Delhi at 4:20PM the same day. Three additional stops have been provided too — at Tohana in Haryana, and Kotkapura and Faridkot in Punjab since its extension up to Firozpur.

== Train ==
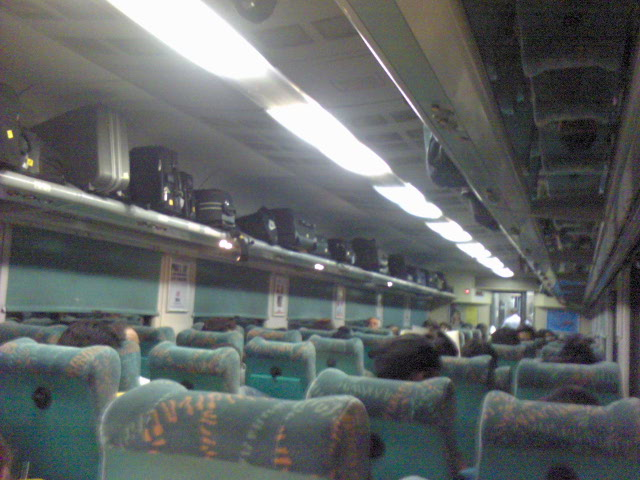
Interior view of New Delhi Firozpur Shatabdi Express AC Chair Car

The trains are fully air-conditioned and of a much higher standard than most Indian rail coaches. Shatabdi Express travellers are provided with snacks, meals, coffee/tea, a one-litre water bottle/ 300 ml packaged water (for short distance journey) provided by the railways owned and operated subsidiary "Rail Neer", and juice.

The train runs with new imported LHB coaches on Monday and Friday. The cost of meals, breakfast etc. is all covered in the booking fare.

== Coaches ==
The 12047 / 48 New Delhi–Firozpur Shatabdi Express had 1 AC First Class, 7 AC Chair Car and 2 End on Generator coaches. It does not carry a pantry car coach but being a Shatabdi category train, catering was arranged on board the train. As it was customary with most train services in India, coach composition may be amended at the discretion of Indian Railways depending on demand.

== Service ==
The 12047 New Delhi–Firozpur Shatabdi Express covers the distance of 386.6 kilometres in 06 hours 25 mins (64.19 km/h) and in 06 hours 25 mins as 12048 Firozpur−New Delhi Shatabdi Express (64.53 km/h).

As the average speed of the train is above 55 km/h (34 mph), as per Indian Railway rules, its fare includes a Superfast Express surcharge.

== Routeing ==
The 12047 / 48 New Delhi–Firozpur Shatabdi Express runs from New Delhi railway station via Rohtak Junction, Jind Junction, Jakhal Junction, Mansa, Bathinda Junction, Kot Kapura Junction, Faridkot to Firozpur Cantonment railway station.

== Timings ==
12047 New Delhi–Firozpur Shatabdi Express leaves New Delhi every Monday and Friday at 16:20 hrs IST and reaches Firozpur Cantonment Junction at 22:45 hrs IST the same day.

12048 Firozpur–New Delhi Shatabdi Express leaves [Firozpur Junction every Monday and Friday at 04:00 hrs IST and reaches New Delhi at 11:30 hrs IST the same day.
