= Ganga Sutlej Express =

Train in India

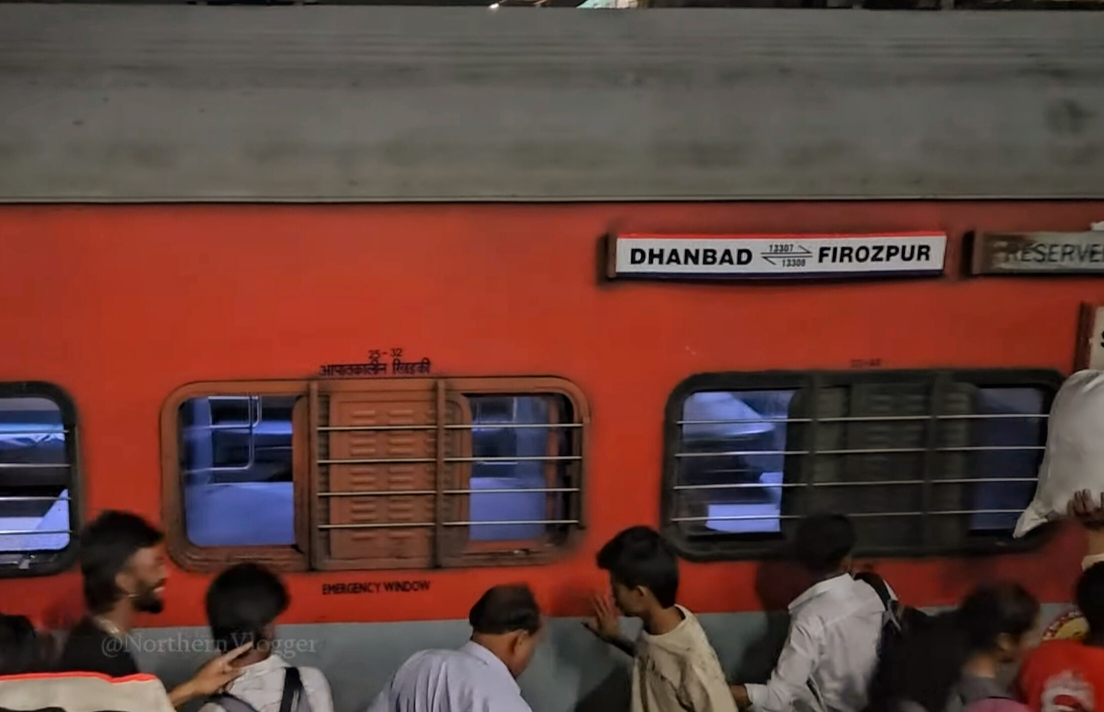

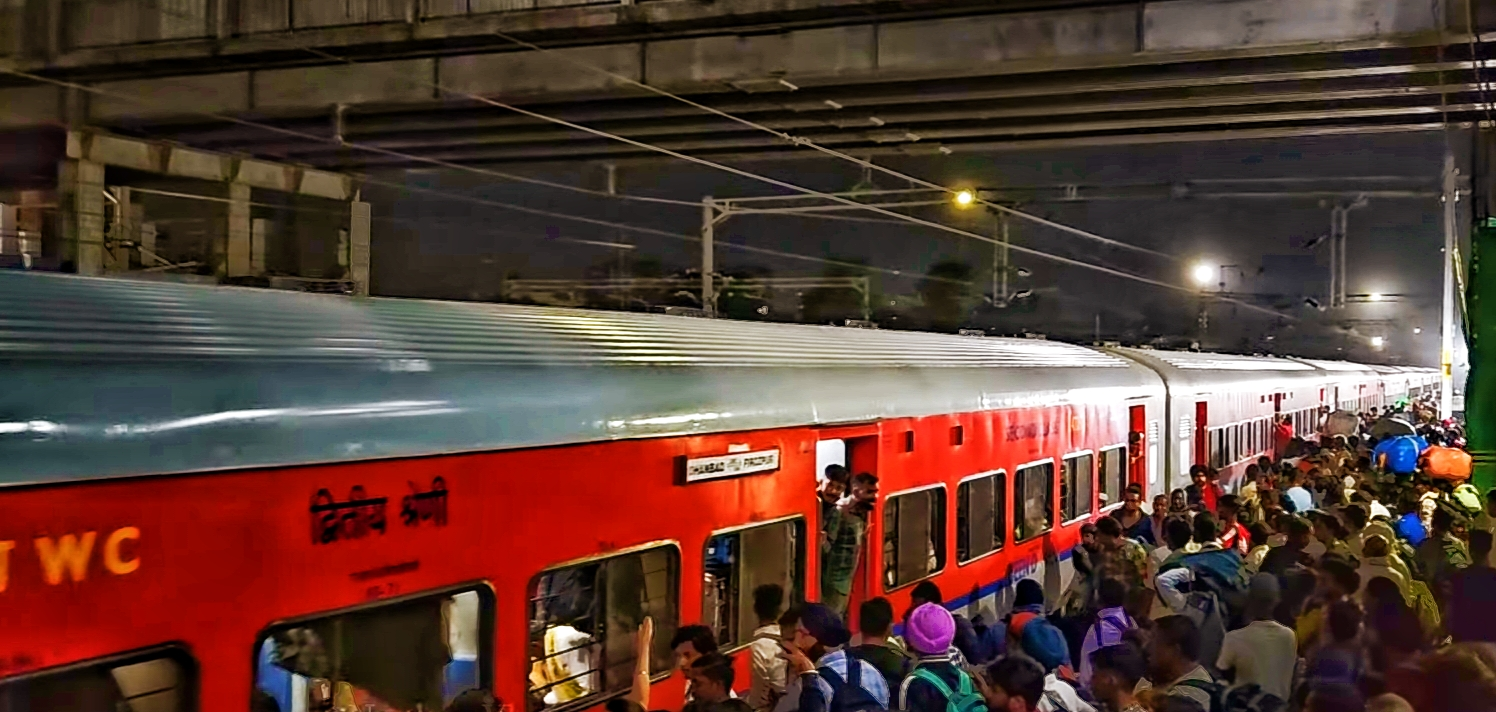
- Ganga Sutlej Express At Ludhiana Junction railway station

Overview
- Service type: Express
- Locale: Jharkhand, Bihar, Uttar Pradesh, Haryana & Punjab
- Current operator: East Central Railway

Route
- Termini: Dhanbad Junction (DHN); Firozpur Cantonment (FZR)
- Stops: 69
- Distance travelled: 1,604 km (997 mi)
- Average journey time: 36 hours 50 minutes
- Service frequency: Daily
- Train number: 13307 / 13308

On-board services
- Classes: AC 2 tier, AC 3 tier, Sleeper class, General Unreserved
- Seating arrangements: Yes
- Sleeping arrangements: Yes
- Catering facilities: On-board catering, E-catering
- Observation facilities: Large windows
- Baggage facilities: Available

Technical
- Rolling stock: LHB coach
- Track gauge: 1,676 mm (5 ft 6 in)
- Operating speed: 44 km/h (27 mph) average with halts.

The 13307 /13308 Ganga Sutlej Express is an Express train belonging to Indian Railways that run between Dhanbad Junction and Firozpur Cantonment in India. It is also known as Kisan Express.

== Background ==
It is named after two Indian Rivers; Ganga (which flows in the holy city of Varanasi, also Chhapra) and Sutlej (a river which flows in the northern states of Punjab and Himachal Pradesh).

== Service ==
It operates as train number 13307 from Dhanbad Junction to Firozpur Cantonment and as train number 13308 in the reverse direction, serving the states of Jharkhand, Bihar, Uttar Pradesh, Haryana & Punjab. The train covers the distance of 1,604 km (997 mi) in 35–37 hours approximately at a speed of (43 km/h (27 mph)).

== Coaches ==
The service presently has 1 First class coach, 3 AC Two-tier coaches, 4 AC Three-tier coaches, 2 AC Three-tier economy coaches, 1 pantry car, 6 sleeper class, 4 unreserved coaches ,1 seating cum luggage coach & 1 generator car.

Loco	1	2	3	4	5	6	7	8	9	10	11	12	13	14	15	16	17	18	19	20	21	22
	EOG	GN	GN	GN	GN	S1	S2	S3	S4	S5	S6	PC	M1	M2	B1	B2	B3	B4	A1	A2	H1	SLR

== Routing ==
The 13307/13308 Ganga Sutlej Express runs from Dhanbad Junction via Netaji Subhas Chandra Bose Gomoh, Gaya Junction, Mughalsarai Junction, Varanasi Junction, Jaunpur Junction, Akbarpur Junction, Ayodhya Junction, Lucknow Charbagh, Laksar Junction,Ambala Cantonment Junction, Ludhiana Junction, Phillaur Junction, Nakodar Junction, Lohian Khas Junction to Firozpur Cantonment.

== Traction ==
As the route is fully electrified, it is hauled by a Gomoh Loco Shed-based WAP-7 electric locomotive from Dhanbad Junction to Firozpur Cantonment and vice versa .
