= Bathinda–Jammu Tawi Express (via Firozpur) =

Train in India

Jodhpur–Jammu Tawi Express (via Firozpur)
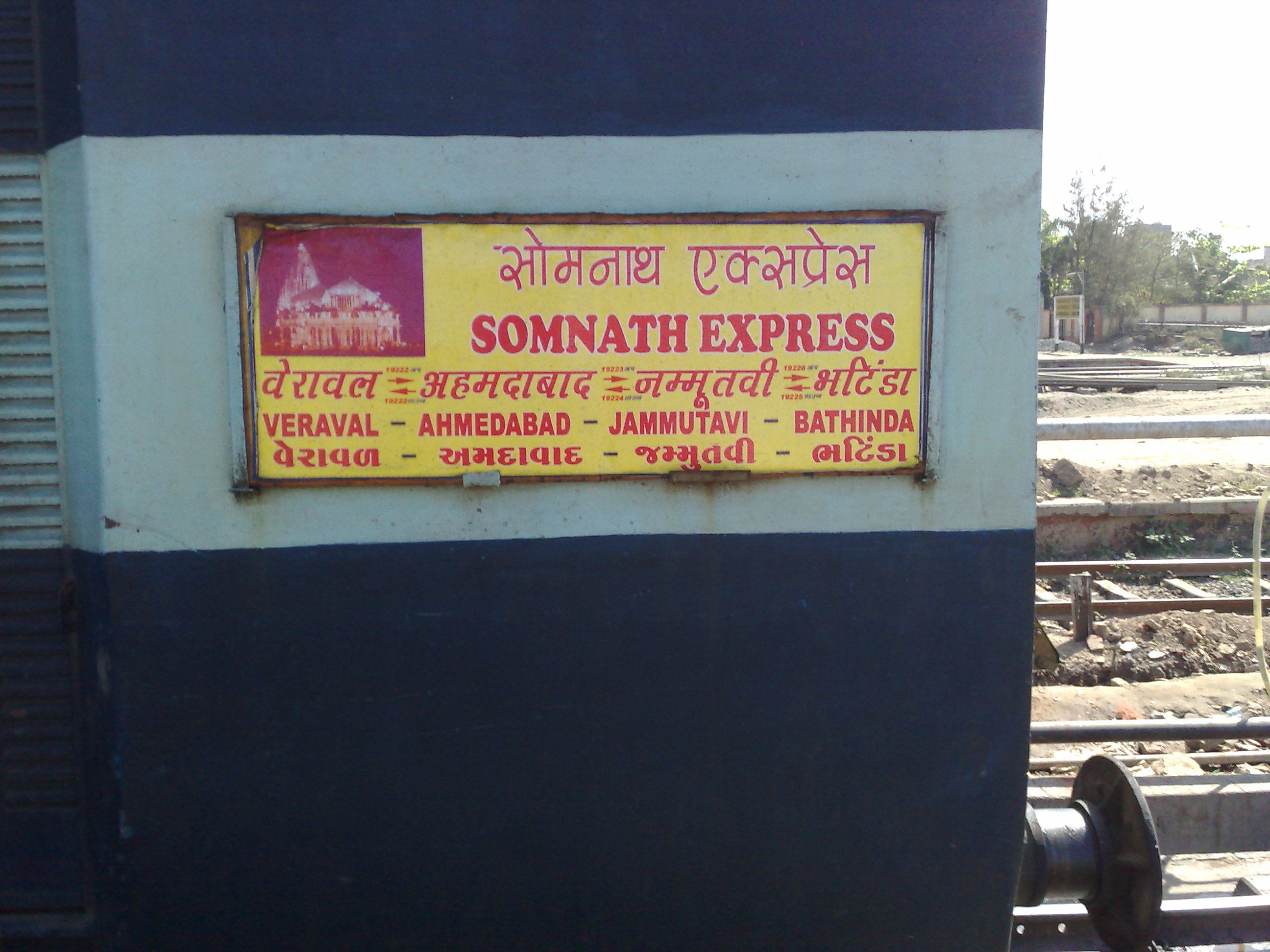

Overview
- Service type: Express
- Status: Extended up to Jodhpur Junction on 16 January 2020.
- Locale: Rajasthan, Haryana, Punjab & Jammu and Kashmir
- Current operator(s): Western Railways

Route
- Termini: Jodhpur Junction (JU); Jammu Tawi (JAT)
- Stops: 31
- Distance travelled: 1,091 km (678 mi)
- Average journey time: 24 hours 10 minutes
- Service frequency: Daily
- Train number(s): 19225/ 19226

On-board services
- Class(es): AC 2 tier, AC 3 tier, Sleeper class, General Unreserved
- Seating arrangements: Yes
- Sleeping arrangements: Yes
- Catering facilities: E-catering
- Observation facilities: Rake sharing with 19221/19222 Somnath Superfast Express & 19223/19224 Ahmedabad–Jammu Tawi Express

Technical
- Rolling stock: ICF coach
- Track gauge: 1,676 mm (5 ft 6 in)
- Operating speed: 110 km/h (68 mph) maximum, 45 km/h (28 mph) average including halts

The 19225 / 19226 Jodhpur–Jammu Tawi Express is an Express train belonging to the Indian Railways that run between Jodhpur Junction and Jammu Tawi in India.

== Service ==
It operates as train number 19225 from Jodhpur Junction to Jammu Tawi and as train number 19226 in the reverse direction, serving the state of Punjab and the union territory of Jammu and Kashmir. The train covers a distance of 490 km (300 mi) in 12 hours, which is approximately a speed of 41 km/h (25 mph).

== Coaches ==
The service presently has one AC 2 Tier, two AC 3 Tier, ten Sleeper class & three General Unreserved coaches.

As with most train services in India, coach composition may be amended at the discretion of Indian Railways depending on demand.

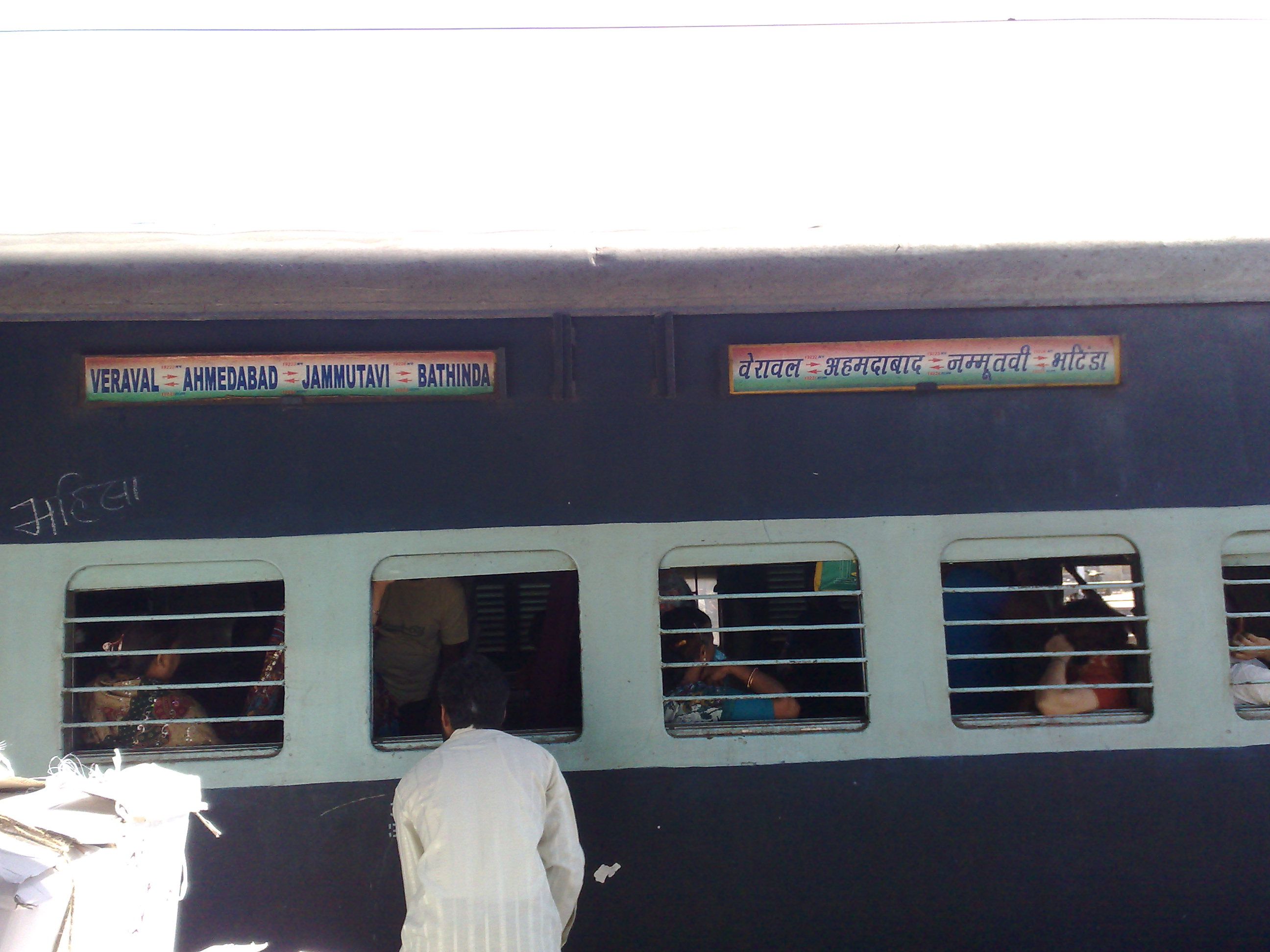
19225/26 Bathinda Jammu Tawi Express shares its rake with 19223/24 Ahmedabad–Jammu Tawi Express

Loco	1	2	3	4	5	6	7	8	9	10	11	12	13	14	15	16	17	18
	SLR	GEN	S10	S9	S8	S7	S6	S5	S4	S3	S2	S1	B2	B1	A1	GEN	GEN	SLR

== Routeing ==
The 19225/19226 Jodhpur–Jammu Tawi Express runs from Jodhpur Junction via Merta Road Junction, Nagaur, Bikaner Junction, Suratgarh Junction, Hanumangarh Junction, Mandi Dabwali, Bathinda Junction, Firozpur Cantonment, Jalandhar City Junction, Amritsar Junction, Pathankot Junction to Jammu Tawi.

== Traction ==
As this route is partially electrified, a Ludhiana-based WDM-3A pulls the train up to its destination.

== See also ==
- Bathinda–Jammu Tawi Express (via Rajpura)
