= FZP =

FZP, or fzp, may refer to:

- FZP, the Indian Railways code for Firozpur City railway station in the state of Punjab, India
- FZP, the National Rail code for Furze Platt railway station in the county of Berkshire, UK
- FZP, a Fresnel zone plate
