= Delhi–Fazilka Intercity Express =

Express train in India

Delhi Junction – Fazilka Intercity Express
Overview
- Service type: Express
- First service: 9 August 2013; 12 years ago
- Current operator: North Western Railway zone

Route
- Termini: Delhi Junction; Fazilka
- Stops: 26
- Distance travelled: 522 km (324 mi)
- Average journey time: 11 hours
- Service frequency: Daily
- Train number: 14731 / 14732

On-board services
- Classes: AC Chair car, general unreserved, Chair car
- Seating arrangements: Yes
- Sleeping arrangements: No
- Catering facilities: No
- Observation facilities: Rake Sharing with 14711 / 14712 Haridwar – Shri Ganganagar Intercity Express & 14281 / 14282 Delhi – Sri Ganganagar Intercity Express

Technical
- Rolling stock: Standard Indian Railways Coaches
- Track gauge: 1,676 mm (5 ft 6 in)
- Operating speed: 49 km/h (30 mph)

The 14731 / 32 Delhi Junction – Fazilka Intercity Express is an express train belonging to Indian Railways North Western Railway zone that runs between Delhi Junction and Fazilka in India.

It operates as train number 14731 from Delhi Junction to Fazilka and as train number 14732 in the reverse direction serving the states of Haryana, Punjab & Delhi.

== Coaches ==
The 14731 / 32 Delhi Junction – Fazilka Intercity Express has one AC 3 Tier, one AC Chair Car, four chair car, seven general unreserved & two SLR (seating with luggage rake) coaches. It does not carry a pantry car coach.

As is customary with most train services in India, coach composition may be amended at the discretion of Indian Railways depending on demand.

== Service ==
The 14731 Delhi Junction – Fazilka Intercity Express covers the distance of 522 km (324 mi) in 10 hours 35 mins (49 km/h) and in 10 hours 45 mins as the 14732 Fazilka – Delhi Junction Intercity Express (49 km/h).

As the average speed of the train is less than 55 km/h (34 mph), as per railway rules, its fare doesn't includes a Superfast surcharge.

== Routing ==
The 14731 / 32 Delhi Junction – Fazilka Intercity Express runs from Delhi Junction via Panipat Junction, Ambala Cantonment Junction, Rajpura Junction, Patiala, Bathinda Junction to Fazilka.

== Traction ==
As the route is going to be electrified, a Bathinda Junction based WDM-3A diesel locomotive pulls the train to its destination.
