= Alexander Cadell =

English cricketer and Royal Navy officer

Personal information
- Full name: Alexander Richard Cadell
- Born: 19 August 1900; Firozpore, Punjab, British India
- Died: 14 May 1928 (aged 27); Petersfield, Hampshire, England
- Batting: Right-handed
- Bowling: Right-arm medium-fast
- Relatives: Vernon Royle (great-uncle)

Domestic team information
- Years: Team
- 1923–1927: Hampshire
- 1927: Marylebone Cricket Club

Career statistics
Competition	First-class
Matches	12
Runs scored	226
Batting average	13.29
100s/50s	–/–
Top score	48
Balls bowled	1,480
Wickets	21
Bowling average	40.66
5 wickets in innings	–
10 wickets in match	–
Best bowling	3/37
Catches/stumpings	6/–
- Source: Cricinfo, 27 December 2009

Alexander Richard Cadell (19 August 1900 – 14 May 1928) was an English first-class cricketer and Royal Navy officer.

The son of the British Indian Army General Alexander Cadell, he was born in British India at Firozpore in August 1900. Cadell was appointed an acting sub-lieutenant in the Royal Navy in July 1917, and served in the final 17 months of the First World War. In February 1919, he gained the full rank of sub-lieutenant, with promotion to lieutenant following in October 1920. Cadell made his debut in first-class cricket for the Royal Navy against the British Army cricket team at Lord's in 1922. He would play first-class cricket for the Royal Navy until 1927, making seven appearances. In addition to his naval cricket, Cadell also played first-class cricket for Hampshire, first appearing for the county against Leicestershire in the 1923 County Championship at Portsmouth. He later played a second first-class match for Hampshire in the 1927 County Championship, against Warwickshire at Portsmouth. Cadell also played first-class cricket for both the Marylebone Cricket Club (MCC), for whom he appeared for twice in 1927 against Oxford University and Cambridge University, and for the Free Foresters, for whom he played for against Oxford University in the same year. Playing as an all-rounder, he took the majority of his wickets with his right-arm medium-fast bowling for the Royal Navy, with 16 wickets at an average of 44.12, and best figures of 3 for 37. As a batsman, he scored 157 runs for the Royal Navy, at an average of 13.08; it was for the MCC that he made his highest score of 48.

Whilst driving near the village of South Harting in Hampshire on the night of 13 May 1928, Cadell's vehicle left the road, falling 70 feet (21 m) down an embankment and catching alight. He was rescued but sustained serious burn injuries, to which he succumbed to the following day at Petersfield Cottage Hospital. His great-uncle was the Test cricketer Vernon Royle.
