= Kala Sanghian =

Kala Sanghian Kala or kaley
- Town
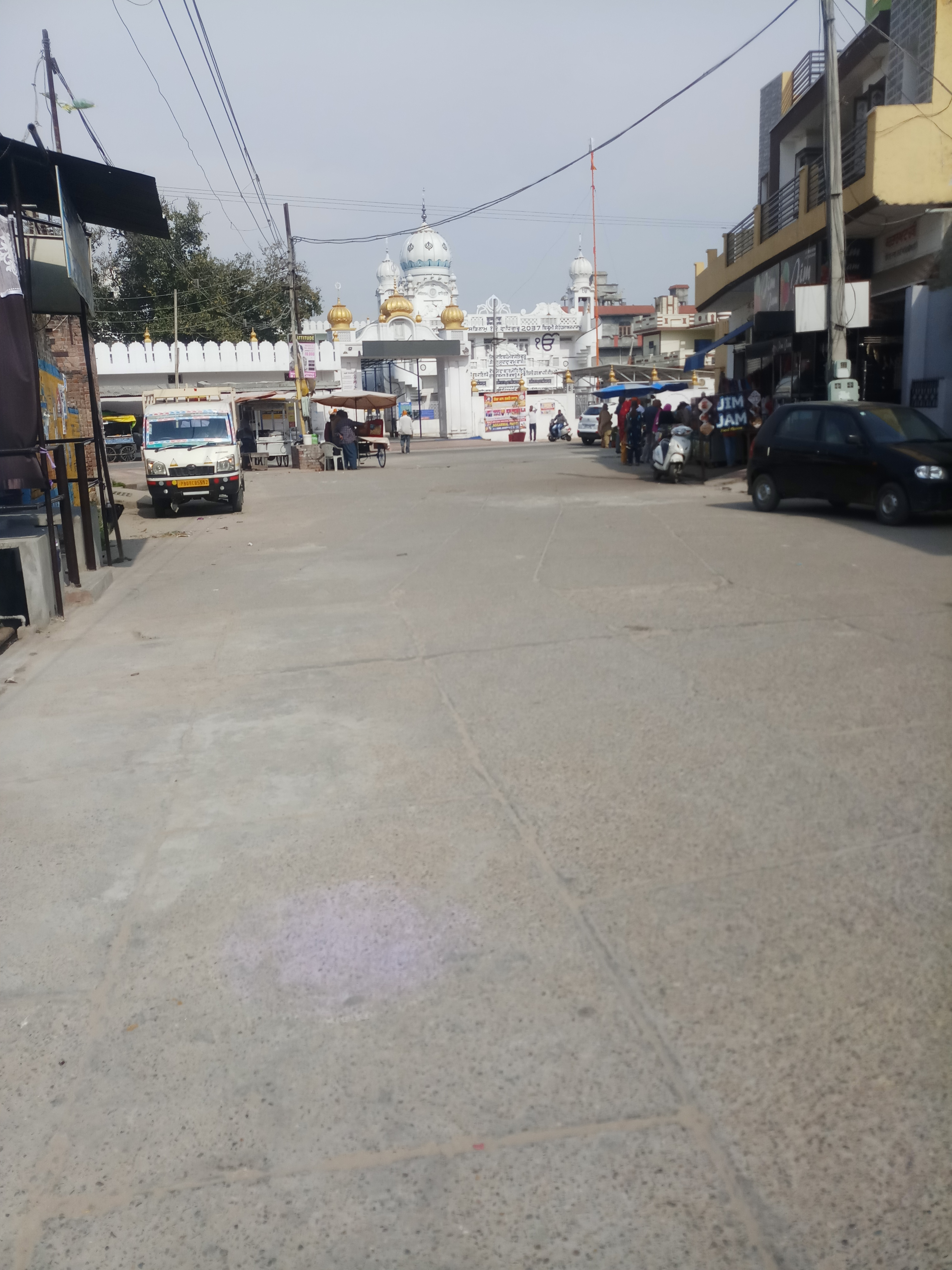
- Gurudwara Baba Kahan Dass ji Kala Sanghian, P.S
- Nickname: Kala
- Anthem: National Anthem of India
- Location within Punjab Location within India Location within South Asia Location within Asia
- Coordinates: 31.262444°N 75.445189°E
- Country: India
- State: Punjab
- District: Kapurthala
- Established: 450 years ago (not such accurate but app.)
- Founder: Sanghas
- Named for: Black dark Snake

Government
  - Type: Panchayti Raj
- Elevation: 228 m (748 ft)

Population (2011)
  - Total: 2,159▲

Languages
  - Official: Punjabi
- Time zone: UTC+5:30 (IST)
- PIN: 144623
- Area code: 01822
- Vehicle registration: PB 09
- Website: https://kalasanghian.com/

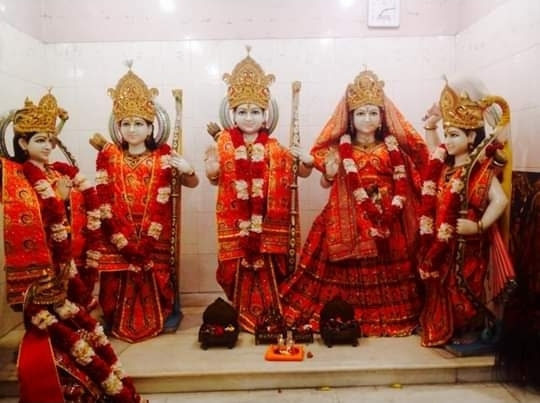
Thakur Dwara Mandir, Kala Sanghian.

Kala Sanghian is a prominent town in the Kapurthala district of Punjab, India, and is considered one of the largest settlements in the region. The town falls under the administrative jurisdiction of Kapurthala. Historically, it was established by the Sangha Jatt community, from whom it partly derives its name. Additionally, local tradition suggests that the name Kala Sanghian may have mythological origins, signifying a “black serpent,” symbolizing strength and resilience.

== Transportation ==
Kala Sanghian lies approximately in the mid of Nakodar and Kapurthala. The nearest railway station to Kala Sanghian is Kapurthala railway station which is around 14 km. Sultanpur Lodhi is 27 km from Kala Sanghian and Jalandhar is 16 km from the Town.

== Gurudwara ==
There is famous gurudwara, Baba Kahan Dass ji, in its Patti of Alamgir, Kapurthala

== Climate ==
The Town has a humid subtropical climate with cool winters and long, hot summers. Summers last from April to June and winters from November to February. Temperatures in the summer vary from average highs of around 48 °C (118 °F) to average lows of around 25 °C (77 °F). Winter temperatures have highs of 19 °C (66 °F) to lows of −7 °C (19 °F). The climate is dry on the whole, except during the brief southwest monsoon season during July and August. The average annual rainfall is about 70 cm.
