= Jalandhar–Firozpur line =

Railway line in India

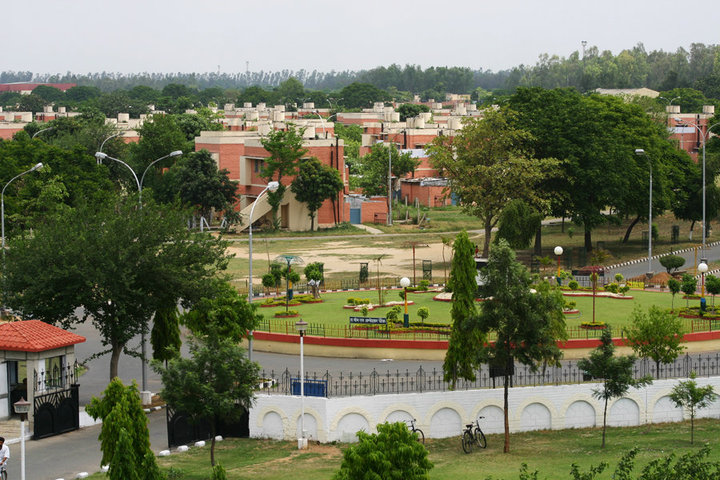
- Rail Coach Factory Kapurthala lies on the Jalandhar–Firozpur line

Overview
- Status: Operational
- Owner: Indian Railways
- Locale: Punjab
- Termini: Jalandhar City; Firozpur Cantonment

Service
- System: Electrified
- Operator(s): Northern Railway

History
- Opened: 1912

Technical
- Track length: 118 km (73 mi)
- Number of tracks: 1 (single)
- Track gauge: 5 ft 6 in (1,676 mm) broad gauge
- Electrification: Yes
- Operating speed: 110 km/h (68 mph)
- Highest elevation: Jalandhar City 239 m (784 ft), Firozpur Cantonment 200 m (656 ft)

The Jalandhar–Firozpur line is a railway line connecting Jalandhar City and Firozpur Cantonment, both in the Indian state of the Punjab. The line is under the administrative jurisdiction of Northern Railway.

Jalandhar City is the only station on this line that is amongst the top hundred booking stations of Indian Railway.

== History ==
The Jalandhar–Firozpur line was laid in 1912. The last official steam service on the line completed its journey on 6 December 1995.

== Route ==
- Jalandhar City Junction railway station
- Khojewala railway station
- Kapurthala railway station
- Rail Coach Factory, Kapurthala, started production in 1988. It is the largest and most modern coach manufacturing unit of Indian Railways, producing around 1,600 coaches annually.
- Husainpur railway station
- Paijan railway station
- Dudwindi railway station
- Sultanpur Junction railway station
- Lohian Khas Junction railway station
- Giddarpindi railway station
- Jogiwala railway station
- Makhu railway station
- Butewala railway station
- Mallanwala Khas railway station
- Tullisaida Sahu railway station
- Mahalam railway station
- Firozpur City railway station
- Hussainiwala railway station (now defunct), lies 6.5 km northwest of Firozepur City railway station. The Hussainiwala]] railway station and the Sadiqui-Sulemanki railway station (16 km southwest of Fazilka and 100km south of Firozpur) are two defunct railway border crossing points on the India–Pakistan border in this area. Before partition of India in 1947, the 711 kilometers (442 miles) long Delhi-Samasata-Lahore line (via Firozepur and HUssainiwala) & 445 kilometers (277 miles) long Delhi-Raiwind line (via Fazilka and Sadqi) were operational. After partition of India, a 20 kilometers (12 miles) line linked Amruka on the Pakistan side of the India–Pakistan border, opposite Fazilka, towards Samasata. The only train running through these tracks was withdrawn after 1965 war. 275 kilometers (171 miles) long Samasata–Amruka Branch Line & 28 kilometres (17 miles) long Kasur-Raiwind lines are still operational in Pakistan. The Hussainiwala–Ganda Singh Wala railway crossing, near Firozpur, became defunct with the partition of India. The 16 kilometers (9.9 miles) broad gauge line from Kasur Junction in Pakistan has been closed. A strategically important 1,681 metres (5,515 feet) Kaiser-E-Hind Rail cum Road Bridge was blown up during the Indo-Pakistani War of 1971 at Hussainiwala, and was never rebuilt. In 2013, Sutlej Barrage Bridge on Hussainiwala was opened after restructuring. See also India-Pakistan border ceremonies.

== Extension ==
Ferozepur–Patti rail link 25.72km long project, costing Rs764.19 cr including Rs166 cr for the land acquisition and Rs400 cr for a railway bridge over the Sutlej river, was approved by the Prime Minister Narendra Modi on 27 October 2025 and a letter was sent to the Chief Secretary of Punjab to commence the acquisition of required 165.79 hectare land. Earlier, the project approved in 2017, was stuck due to non-payment of its monetary share by the Punjab government, but the Prime Minister removed the hurdle by approving the project to be 100% funded by the central government. This geostrategically important link allow the faster movement of Indian Military by shortening the Amritsar-Firozpur rail distance by 89 km (from 196 km to 107 km), Firozpur-Khemkaran rail distance by 204 km (from 273 km to 69 km), and Jammu-Firozpur-Fazilka-Mumbai rail distance by 236 km. Socioeconomically, the link will benefit 1 million people of the area, create over 125,000 jobs, and facilitate 3,500 daily passengers. The project will be completed in 3 years, i.e. by late 2028.
