= Ludhiana–Firozpur–Fazilka line =

Indian railway line

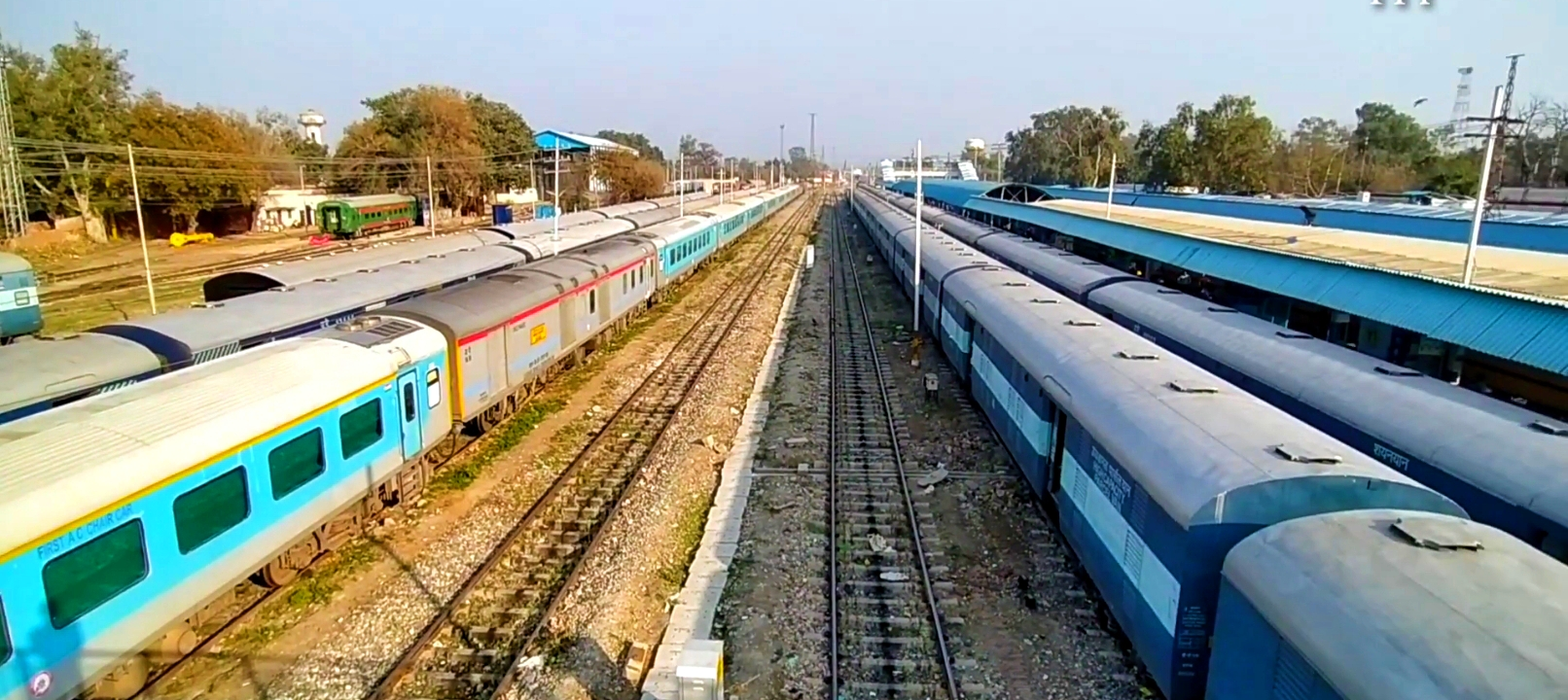
- Firozpur Cantt Junction is an important railway station on Ludhiana–Fazilka line

Overview
- Native name: लुधियाना–फ़िरोज़पुर–फ़ाज़िल्का रेल मार्ग
- Status: Operational
- Owner: Indian Railways
- Locale: Punjab
- Termini: Ludhiana; Fazilka

Service
- System: Electrified
- Operator: Northern Railway
- Depot: Ludhiana

History
- Opened: 1905

Technical
- Track length: 212.8 km (132 mi)
- Number of tracks: 1 (Single line)
- Track gauge: 5 ft 6 in (1,676 mm) broad gauge
- Electrification: Yes
- Operating speed: 110 km/h (68 mph)
- Highest elevation: Ludhiana 246 m (807 ft), Firozpur 210 m (689 ft) Fazilka 182 m (597 ft)

The Ludhiana–Firozpur–Fazilka line is a railway line connecting Ludhiana and Fazilka both in the Indian state of the Punjab. The line is under the administrative jurisdiction of Northern Railway.

== History ==
The Southern Punjab Railway Co. opened the 711 km (442 mi) long Delhi–Jind-Bhatinda–Fazilka-Bahawalnagar-Samma Satta line in 1897. The line passed through Rohtak-Jind-Bhatinda-Muktasar-Fazilka-Bahawalnagar and provided direct connection through Samma Satta (now in Pakistan) to Karachi. The extension from the Macleodganj (later renamed Mandi Sadiqganj and now in Pakistan) railway line to Ambala via Qasamwala-Hindumalkote-Abohar-Bhatinda-Patiala was opened by the same company in 1902.

== Railway border crossings ==
Fazilka and Hussainiwala on this line are two defunct railway border crossing points on the India–Pakistan border. Before partition of India in 1947, there were 711 kilometres (442 mi) long Delhi-Samma Satta & 445 kilometres (277 mi)long Delhi-Raiwind railway lines, which were operational. After partition of India, a 20 kilometres (12 mi) line linked Amruka on the Pakistan side of the India–Pakistan border, opposite Fazilka, towards Samma Satta. The only train running through these tracks was withdrawn after 1965 war. 275 kilometres (171 mi) long Amruka-Samma Satta line & 28 kilometres (17 mi) long Kasur-Raiwind lines are operational in Pakistan now. The Hussainiwala–Ganda Singh Wala railway crossing, near Firozpur, became defunct with the partition of India. The 16 kilometres (9.9 mi) broad gauge line from Kasur Junction in Pakistan has been closed. A strategically important 1,681 metres (5,515 ft) Kaiser-E-Hind Rail-cum-Road Bridge was blown up during the Indo-Pakistani War of 1971 at Hussainiwala, and was never rebuilt. In 2013, Sutlej Barrage Bridge on Hussainiwala was opened after restructuring.

== Loco sheds ==
Ludhiana diesel shed holds 170+ locos including WDM-2, WDM-3A and WDG-3A. Ludhiana electric loco shed was commissioned in 2001 and houses WAM-4, WAG-5 and WAG-7 locos.

== Developments ==
The 81 km (50 mi) long 5 ft 6 in (1,676 mm) broad gauge line between Fazilka & Firozpur was laid in 1950, destroyed in 1965 and 1971 wars and finally re-laid in 1972 as an 84.8 km (53 mi) long 5 ft 6 in (1,676 mm) broad gauge line. The 42 km (26 mi) new 1,676 mm (5 ft 6 in)-wide 5 ft 6 in (1,676 mm) broad gauge line between Fazilka and Abohar declared on 2010, was opened in 2012.

The Indian Railways have been considering proposals for converting the existing 124 km (77 mi) Ludhiana–Firozpur single line into a double line.

== Passenger movement ==
Ludhiana is the only station on this line which is amongst the top hundred booking stations of Indian Railway.

== Railway reorganisation ==
Sind Railway (later reorganised as Scinde, Punjab & Delhi Railway) was formed a guaranteed railway in 1856. It constructed broad-gauge railways from Delhi to Multan via Lahore, and from Karachi to Kotri. Multan and Kotri were connected by ferry service on the Indus River. In 1871–72, Indus Valley Railway was formed to connect Multan and Kotri. At the same time, Punjab Northern State Railway started constructing from Lahore towards Peshawar. In 1886, Sind, Punjab and Delhi Railway was acquired by the state and amalgamated with Indus Valley Railway and Punjab Northern State Railway to form North-Western State Railway. Southern Punjab Railway was taken over by the state and merged with North Western Railway in 1930.

With the partition of India in 1947, North Western Railway was split. While the western portion became Pakistan West Railway, and later Pakistan Railways, the eastern part became Eastern Punjab Railway. In 1952,Northern Railway was formed with a portion of East Indian Railway Company west of Mughalsarai, Jodhpur Railway, Bikaner Railway and Eastern Punjab Railway.
