= Kapurthala railway station =

Railway station in Punjab, India

Kapurthala

General information
- Location: Station Rd, Ashok Vihar, Kapurthala, Punjab; India
- Coordinates: 31°21′59″N 75°22′57″E
- Elevation: 230 metres (750 ft)
- System: Indian Railway
- Owner: Indian Railways
- Operator: Northern Railway
- Line: Jalandhar–Firozpur line
- Platforms: 2
- Tracks: 5 ft 6 in (1,676 mm) broad gauge

Construction
- Structure type: Standard on ground
- Parking: Yes

Other information
- Status: Functioning
- Station code: KXH
- Division(s): Firozpur
Location
- Location within Punjab

Kapurthala (station code: KXH) is a railway station located in Kapurthala district in the Indian state of Punjab and serves Kapurthala city. Kapurthala station is managed by Firozpur railway division of Northern Railway zone of Indian Railways.

== The railway station ==
Kapurthala railway station is at an elevation of 230 metres (750 ft) and was assigned the code – KXH. The station is located on the single track, 5 ft 6 in (1,676 mm) broad gauge Jalandhar–Firozpur line. It is well connected to a number of major cities.

== Electrification ==
Currently the trains coming to Kapurthala are powered by diesel locomotives although electrification of the track is in pipeline.

== Amenities ==
Kapurthala railway station has computerized reservation counters, and all basic amenities. one ATM is available at the station,
