= Bathinda–Jammu Tawi Express (via Rajpura) =

Train in India

Overview
- Service type: Express
- Locale: Punjab & Jammu and Kashmir
- First service: 27 February 2014; 12 years ago
- Current operator: Northern Railways

Route
- Termini: Bathinda Junction (BTI); Jammu Tawi (JAT)
- Stops: 11
- Distance travelled: 523 km (325 mi)
- Average journey time: 10 hours 35 minutes
- Service frequency: Weekly
- Train number: 14501 / 14502

On-board services
- Classes: AC 2 tier, AC 3 tier, Sleeper class, General Unreserved
- Seating arrangements: Yes
- Sleeping arrangements: Yes
- Catering facilities: E-catering

Technical
- Rolling stock: ICF coach
- Track gauge: 1,676 mm (5 ft 6 in)
- Operating speed: 110 km/h (68 mph) maximum, 49 km/h (30 mph) average including halts

The 14501 / 14502 Bathinda Jammu Tawi Express is an express train belonging to the Indian Railways that runs between Bathinda Junction and Jammu Tawi in India.

== Service ==
It operates as train number 14501 from Bathinda Junction to Jammu Tawi and as train number 14502 in the reverse direction, serving the state of Punjab and the union territory of Jammu and Kashmir. The train covers a distance of 523 km (325 mi) in 11 hours, which is approximately a speed of 48 km/h (30 mph).

== Coaches ==
The service presently has 1 AC 3 Tier, 4 Sleeper class & 4 General Unreserved coaches are there.

As with most train services in India, coach composition may be amended at the discretion of Indian Railways depending on demand.

Loco	1	2	3	4	5	6	7	8	9	10	11
	SLR	GEN	B1	S1	S2	S3	S4	GEN	GEN	GEN	SLR

== Routeing ==
14501/14502 Bathinda–Jammu Tawi Express runs from Bathinda Junction via Bhuchchu, Rampura Phul, Tapa, Barnala, Dhuri Junction, Nabha, Patiala, Rajpura Junction, Ludhiana Junction, Jalandhar Cantonment Junction, Pathankot Cantonment to Jammu Tawi.

== Traction ==
As this route is partially electrified, a Ludhiana-based WDM-3A pulls the train to its destination.

== See also ==
- Bathinda–Jammu Tawi Express (via Firozpur)
