= Lohian Khas =

- Town
- Location in Punjab, India Lohian Khas (India)
- Coordinates: 31.16132°N 75.211099°E
- Country: India
- State: Punjab
- District: Jalandhar

Population (2001)
  - Total: 8,546

Languages
  - Official: Punjabi
- Time zone: UTC+5:30 (IST)
- PIN: 144629

Lohian Khas is a town and a nagar panchayat in Jalandhar district in the Indian state of Punjab. There were 11 wards in this town recently two more wards are constituted now currently 13 wards represent this town. A bus stand and railway station also situated here. As per the Rail Department's terminology, Lohian station comes under the category of "rail junction", this type of terminology used where three or more rail tracks joins together and this important to mention here that historical city Patiala from railway point of view not comes under the category of junction By train people go to Makhu, Ferozpur, Sultanpur Lodhi, Kapurthala, Nakodar, Jalandhar and Ludhiana. There are schools for computer education and Ielts academies also here.

== Demographics ==
As of 2001 India census, Lohian Khas had a population of 8546. Males constitute 53% of the population and females 47%. Lohian Khas has an average literacy rate of 66%, higher than the national average of 59.5%: male literacy is 69%, and female literacy is 63%. In Lohian Khas, 13% of the population is under 6 years of age.
