= Moga railway station =

Railway station in Punjab, India

Moga

General information
- Location: Railway Road, Moga, Punjab; India
- Coordinates: 30.8175°N 75.1687°E
- Elevation: 223 metres (732 ft)
- System: Indian Railway
- Owner: Indian Railways
- Operator: Northern Railway
- Line: Ludhiana–Fazilka line
- Platforms: 2
- Tracks: 5 ft 6 in (1,676 mm) broad gauge

Construction
- Structure type: Standard on ground
- Parking: Yes
- Cycle facilities: No

Other information
- Status: Functioning
- Station code: MOGA
- Division(s): Firozpur railway division
Location
- Location within India Location within Punjab

Moga Railway Station is located in Moga district in the Indian state of Punjab and serves Moga city.

== The railway station ==
Moga railway station is at an elevation of 223 metres (732 ft) and was assigned the code – MOGA. The station consists of two platforms. The platforms are not well sheltered. It lacks many facilities including water and sanitation. The station serves Ludhiana–Fazilka line.
