= Kapurthala =

Kapurthala Kapūrthalā (Punjabi)
- City
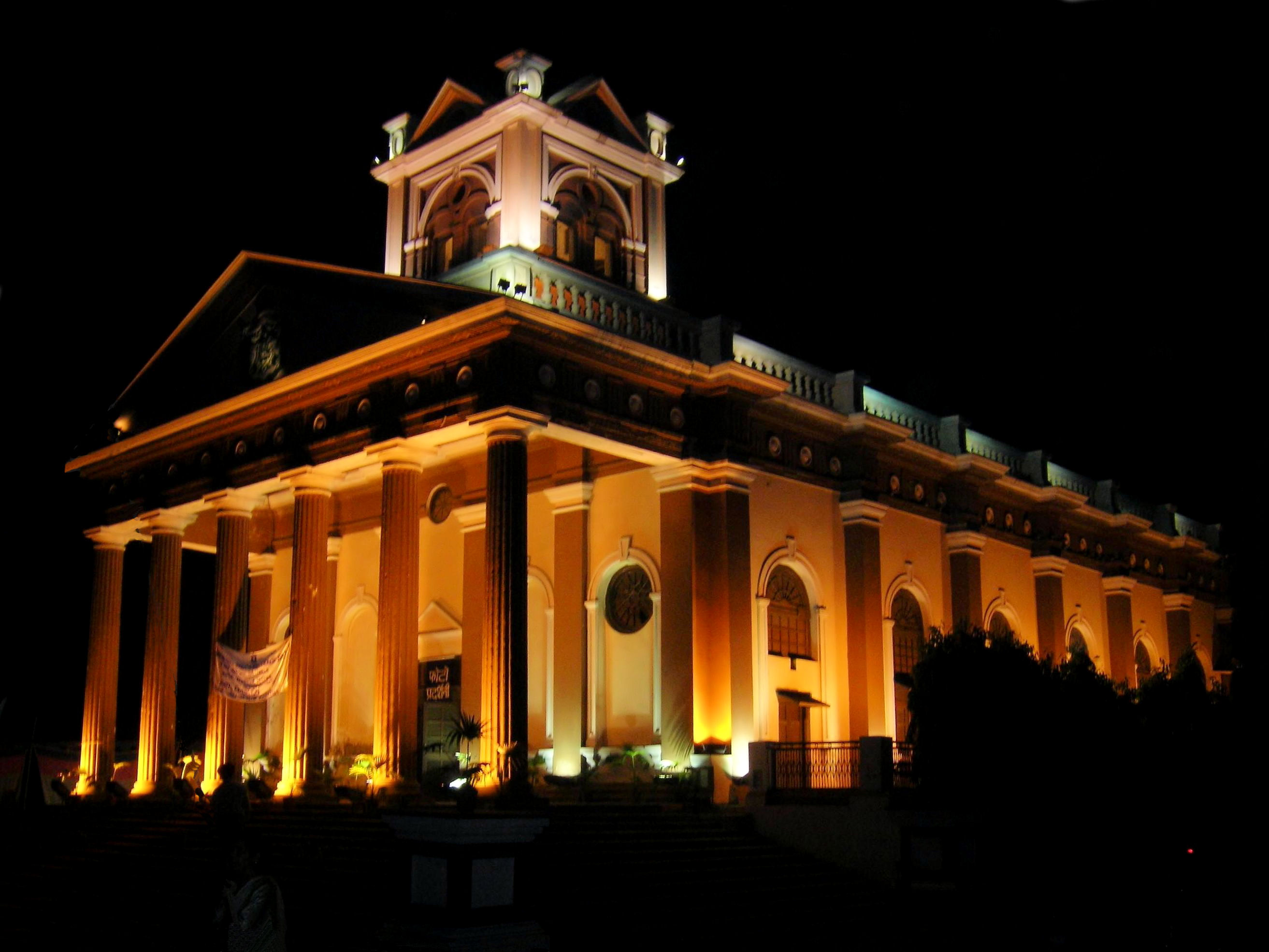
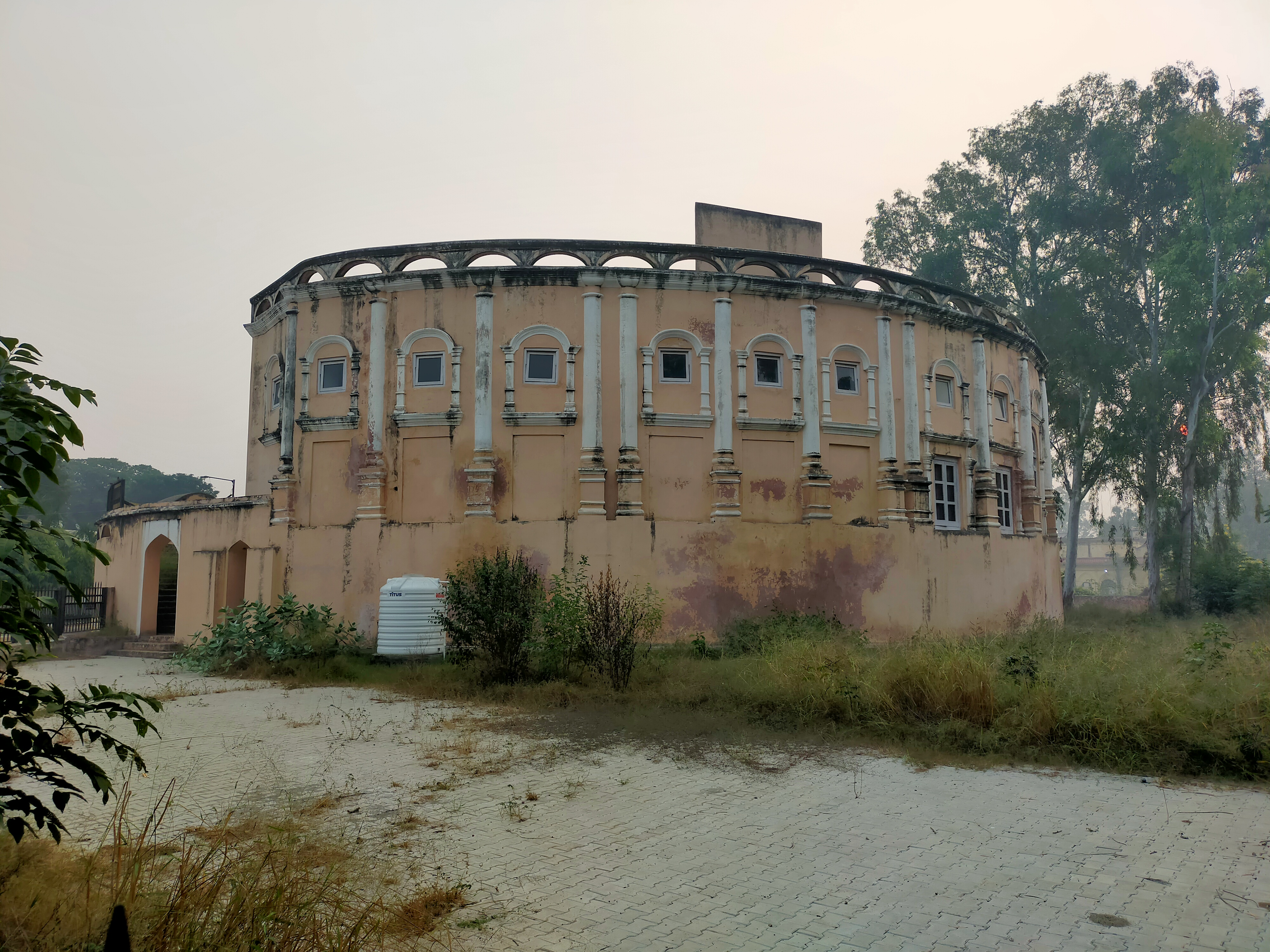
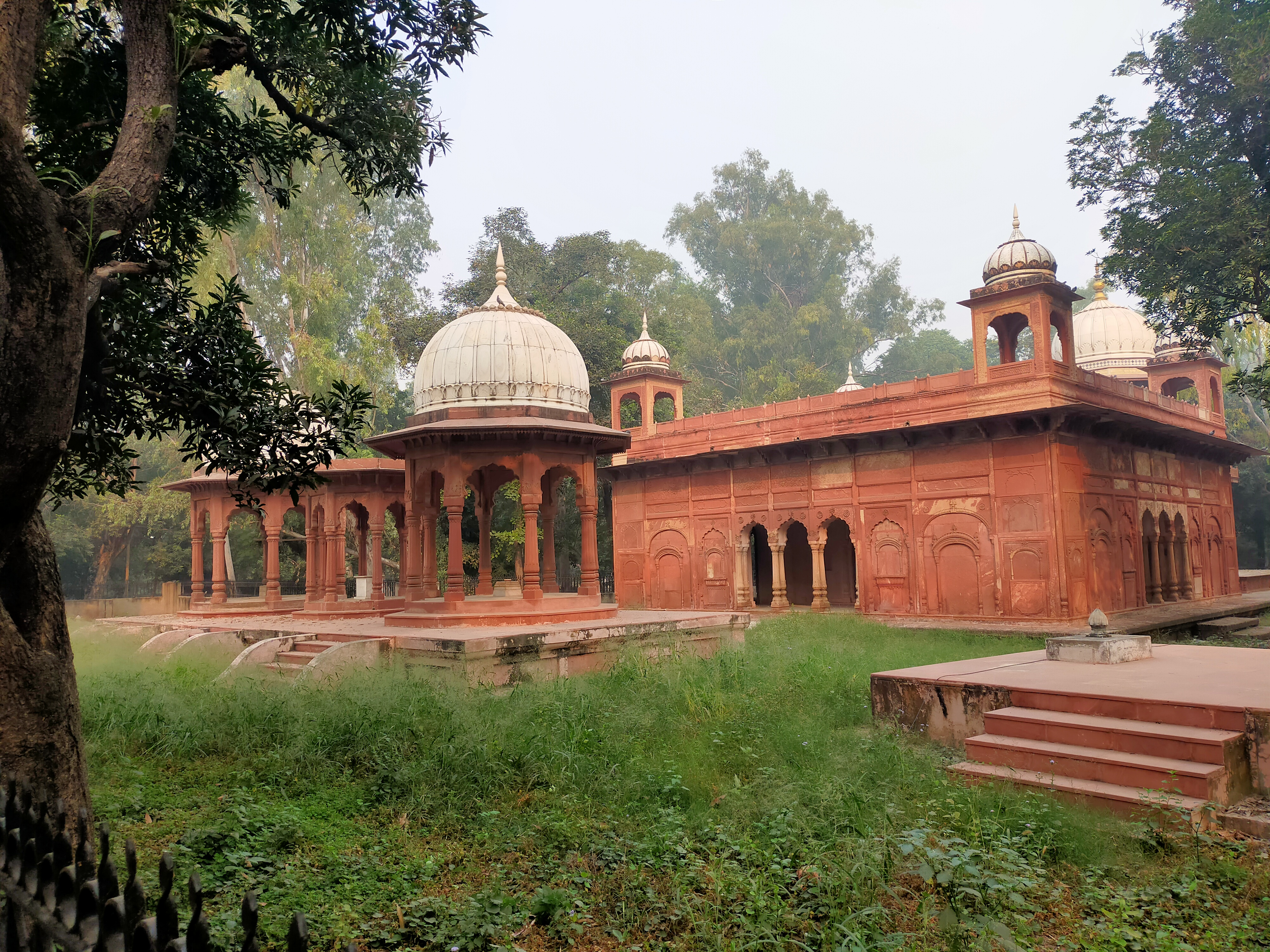
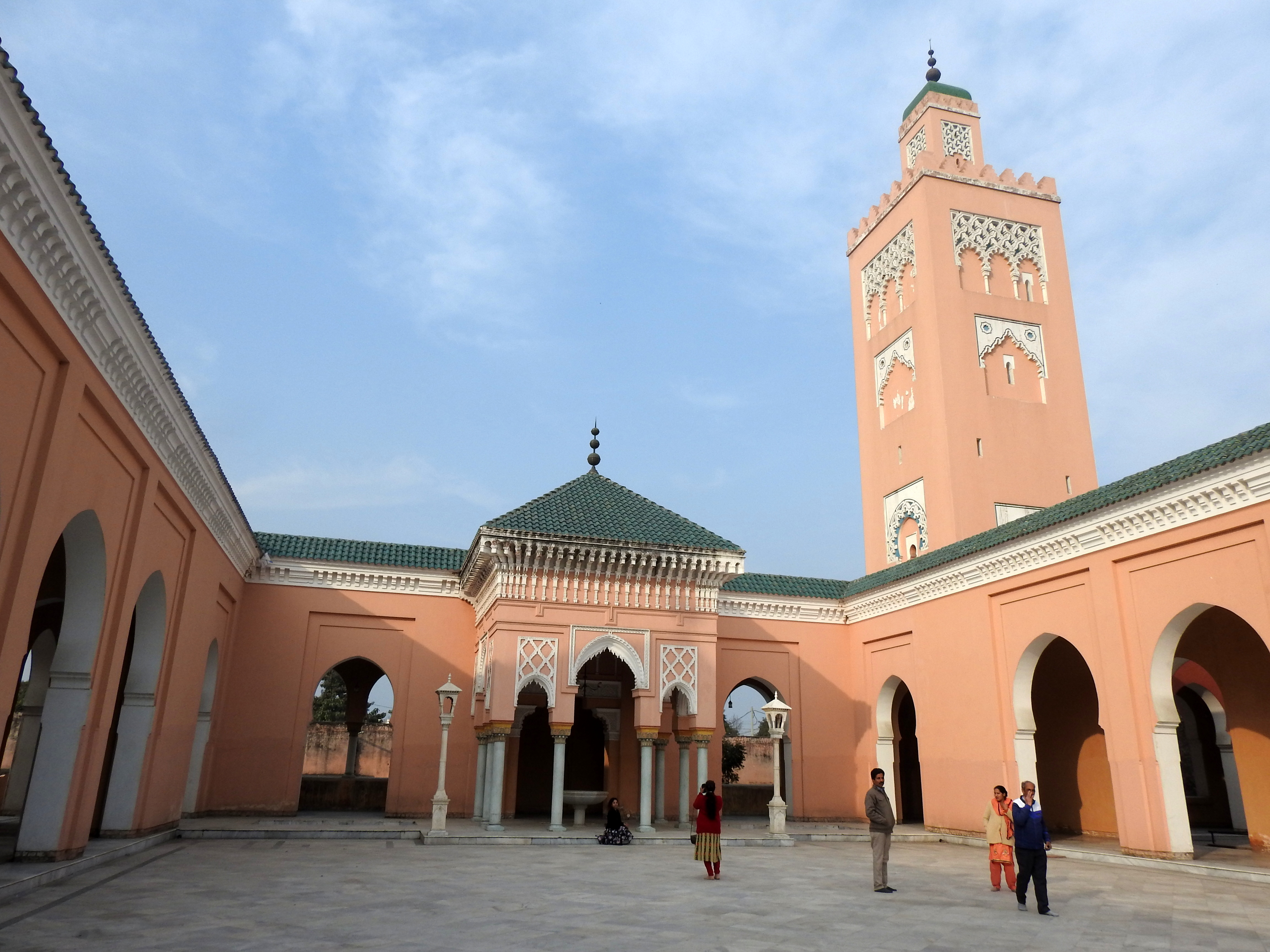
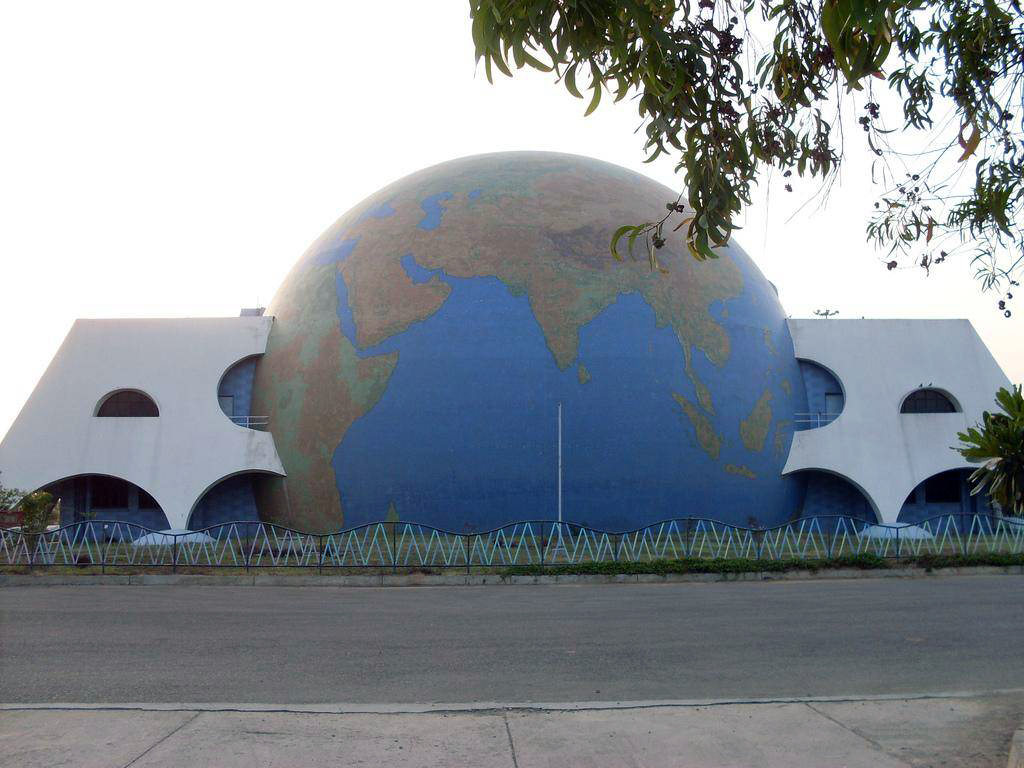
- Jagatjit Club Gol Kothi Shalimar Gardens Moorish Mosque Pushpa Gujral Science City
- Nickname: City of Palaces
- Location in Punjab, India Kapurthala (India)
- Coordinates: 31.38°N 75.38°E
- Country: India
- State: Punjab
- District: Kapurthala
- Founder: Jassa Singh Ahluwalia
- Named for: Nawab Kapur Singh

Government
  - Body: Municipal Corporation Kapurthala
- Elevation: 225 m (738 ft)

Population (2011)
  - Total: 101,854

Languages
  - Official: Punjabi
- Time zone: UTC+5:30 (IST)
- PIN: 144 601
- Telephone code: 01822
- Vehicle registration: PB-09

Kapurthala (Punjabi pronunciation: [kə.puːɾ.t̪ʰə.läː]) is a city in the Punjab state of India. It is the administrative headquarters of the Kapurthala District. It was the capital of the Kapurthala State, a princely state in British India. It is an immediate neighbour of Jalandhar city proper, and a part of the Jalandhar Metropolitan Region. The aesthetic mix of the city, with its prominent buildings based on French and Indo-Saracenic architecture self-narrate its princely past. And for this reason, it has often been referred to as the “Paris of Punjab”. It is also known as the 'City of Palaces & Gardens'. According to the 2011 census, Kapurthala is the least populated city in India.

== History ==
Rana Kapur, described as a Bhatti Rajput ruler from Jaisalmer royal family, is credited with founding of Kapurthal, in the early 11th century. Rana Kapur is said to have migrated from his original home in Jaisalmer to the area in-between the Jalandhar and Bias rivers, where he founded Kapurthala at about the same time Muhmud of Ghazni was in the process of invading India. The Ahluwalia dynasty is claimed to be descended from him.

Kapurthala as a city was founded by Jassa Singh Ahluwalia in 1743 upon its capture as a village. Prior to this, the city was a smaller Village with an unrecorded name under the tribute of Mughal Nawabs who served as feudatories. Jassa Singh Ahluwalia would name the city after his predecessor Nawab Kapur Singh, who was an influential and respected Sikh leader at the time as well as a mentor to Jassa Singh Ahluwlia.

=== Princely state ===
Kapurthala flag

In 1743, Kapurthala, which was still a village and had a different name at the time, was seized from Muslim chieftains and was annexed into Kapurthala State by the Ahluwalia Sikh rulers. The flag of Kapurthala has a two color background, with an insignia and a motto that says "pro rege et patria" (in Latin) meaning "For king and country".

== Demographics ==
As per provisional data of the 2011 census, Kapurthala had a population of 101,854. The Sikh Population has decreased over the past century, becoming a minority population due to mass immigration of Sikhs from the city and also from surrounding villages and areas to overseas nations. Of the population, there were 55,485 males and 46,169 females. The literacy rate was 85.82 per cent.

Religions in Kapurthala
Religion	Percent
Hinduism	56.79%
Sikhism	32.74%
Islam	1.26%
Christianity	0.59%
Jainism	0.11%
Buddhism	0.02%
Other	0.51%

The table below shows the population of different religious groups in Kapurthala city, as of 2011 census.

Population by religious groups in Kapurthala city, 2011 census
Religion	Total	Female	Male
Hindu	62,056	27,793	34,263
Sikh	34,410	16,298	18,112
Muslim	1,242	469	773
Christian	579	256	323
Jain	110	47	63
Buddhist	17	7	10
Other religions	28	12	16
Not stated	474	233	241
Total	98,916	45,115	53,801

== Climate ==
The city has a humid subtropical climate (Koppen: Cwa), bordering on a hot semi arid climate (Koppen: BSh), with its rainfall patterns and weather influenced by the Indian monsoon and Western Distrubances.

Climate data for Kapurthala (1981–2010, extremes 1966–1996)
Month	Jan	Feb	Mar	Apr	May	Jun	Jul	Aug	Sep	Oct	Nov	Dec	Year
Record high °C (°F)	27.7 (81.9)	28.2 (82.8)	35.0 (95.0)	43.0 (109.4)	47.7 (117.9)	47.3 (117.1)	45.5 (113.9)	41.2 (106.2)	41.0 (105.8)	38.1 (100.6)	39.0 (102.2)	28.0 (82.4)	47.7 (117.9)
Mean daily maximum °C (°F)	18.2 (64.8)	20.8 (69.4)	25.6 (78.1)	33.4 (92.1)	38.4 (101.1)	40.5 (104.9)	36.0 (96.8)	34.0 (93.2)	34.1 (93.4)	31.3 (88.3)	25.9 (78.6)	20.3 (68.5)	29.9 (85.8)
Mean daily minimum °C (°F)	5.0 (41.0)	7.5 (45.5)	11.8 (53.2)	17.1 (62.8)	21.8 (71.2)	24.0 (75.2)	24.0 (75.2)	24.8 (76.6)	22.6 (72.7)	16.9 (62.4)	10.8 (51.4)	5.8 (42.4)	16.0 (60.8)
Record low °C (°F)	0.0 (32.0)	1.0 (33.8)	1.8 (35.2)	7.0 (44.6)	11.8 (53.2)	15.5 (59.9)	14.5 (58.1)	17.8 (64.0)	12.0 (53.6)	8.0 (46.4)	2.0 (35.6)	0.0 (32.0)	0.0 (32.0)
Average rainfall mm (inches)	24.1 (0.95)	32.8 (1.29)	35.6 (1.40)	23.3 (0.92)	31.9 (1.26)	29.3 (1.15)	211.3 (8.32)	198.6 (7.82)	129.0 (5.08)	12.1 (0.48)	7.3 (0.29)	12.0 (0.47)	787.3 (31.00)
Average rainy days	2.1	3.4	3.2	2.3	2.2	2.3	6.9	7.3	3.8	0.6	0.7	1.3	36.1
Average relative humidity (%) (at 17:30 IST)	75	74	72	62	60	56	75	83	72	69	70	72	70
Source: India Meteorological Department

== Railway ==
The Kapurthala railway station is located on the Jalandhar–Firozpur line.

== Education ==
- NJSA Government College, established in 1856, popularly known as Randhir College, after its founder Randhir Singh of Kapurthala
- Bebe Nanaki University College Mithra

== Culture and films ==
- The film 'Tanu Weds Manu' (2011) had some scenes shot in Kapurthala city and Kala Sanghian.
- Kapurthala gives its name to the Kapurthala stomacher, a wedding gift from the Maharajah to Mary of Teck, the future Queen Mary, in 1893.

== Literature ==
- Kapurthala is the birthplace of the Urdu Poet, Mehr Lal Soni Zia Fatehabadi.

== Tourism ==
Kapurthala — also known as the 'Paris of Punjab' — has a number of historic buildings that are worth seeing, though they are in a poor state of repair. The Moorish Mosque is open to visitors and was built in 1930 by Maharaja Jagatjit Singh. It was the based on the Grand Mosque of Marrakesh, the Jagatjit Palace, was built in 1908, and based on palaces in Versailles and Fontainebleau and is now a military academy, and only visible from the street. The Shalimar Gardens hold memorials to former royal family members, and the Jagatjit Club is a private members club and only visible from outside.

Kapurthala also hosts the Pushpa Gujral Science City and Rail Coach Factory, Kapurthala.
