= Firozpur City railway station =

Railway station in India

Firozpur City

General information
- Location: Kasuri Gage, Ferozepur, Punjab 152002; India
- Coordinates: 30°57′44″N 76°36′04″E
- Elevation: 198 metres (650 ft)
- System: Indian Railways junction station
- Owner: Indian Railways
- Operator: Northern Railway
- Line: Ludhiana–Fazilka line
- Platforms: 3
- Tracks: 5 ft 6 in (1,676 mm) broad gauge

Construction
- Structure type: Standard on ground
- Parking: Yes
- Cycle facilities: No

Other information
- Status: Functioning
- Station code: FZP
- Division(s): Firozpur

History
- Electrified: Ongoing
Location
- Location within Punjab

Firozpur City Railway Station is located in Firozpur district in the Indian state of Punjab and serves Firozpur.

== The railway station ==
Firozpur City railway station is at an elevation of 198 metres (650 ft) and was assigned the code – FZP. The station serves Firozpur-Fazilka line.

Preceding station	Indian Railways	Following station
Firozpur Cantonment towards ?	Northern Railway zone Ludhiana–Fazilka line	Terminus
