= Hazipur, Alwar =

Hazipur is a village in Alwar district, Rajasthan, India.
