= Horatio Dumbleton =

English cricketer

Personal information
- Full name: Horatio Norris Dumbleton
- Born: 23 October 1858; Ferozepore, Punjab, British India
- Died: 18 December 1935 (aged 77); Winchester, Hampshire, England
- Batting: Right-handed
- Bowling: Unknown-arm underarm slow

Domestic team information
- Years: Team
- 1884: Hampshire

Career statistics
Competition	First-class
Matches	1
Runs scored	16
Batting average	8.00
100s/50s	–/–
Top score	9
Balls bowled	14
Wickets	0
Bowling average	–
5 wickets in innings	–
10 wickets in match	–
Best bowling	–
Catches/stumpings	–/–
- Source: Cricinfo, 14 December 2009

Horatio Norris Dumbleton (23 October 1858 – 18 December 1935) was an English first-class cricketer and British Army officer.

The son of the British Army General Charles Dumbleton, he was born in British India at Ferozepore in October 1858. Like his father, Dumbleton sought a military career and attended the Royal Military Academy, Woolwich. He graduated from there into the Royal Engineers as a lieutenant in October 1877. Dumbleton played services cricket for the Royal Engineers, meeting with some success. In mid-August 1884, he scored 325 runs for them in a total of 676 for 4 against the Royal Marines at Portsmouth. This likely contributed to his selection in the Hampshire team at the end of August for a first-class fixture against Somerset at Bath. Batting twice in the match, he was dismissed for 7 runs in Hampshire's first innings by Ted Sainsbury, while following-on in their second innings he was run out for 9.

In the Royal Engineers, Dumbleton was promoted to captain in April 1888. By 1890, he was an assistant instructor at the Royal School of Military Engineering, and was appointed chief instructor at the School of Submarine Mining in August 1895. He was appointed Inspector of Submarine Defences at Headquarters in February 1901 (at which point he held the rank of major), later vacating this appointment in March 1905. He was promoted to lieutenant colonel in July 1906, before being appointed a brevet colonel in July 1909. He retired from active service in July 1911. Dumbleton died at Winchester on 18 December 1935.
