= Lohian Khas Junction railway station =

Train station in Punjab, India

Lohian Khas Junction

General information
- Location: NH703A, Lohian Khas, Jalandhar, Punjab; India
- Coordinates: 31°09′55″N 75°11′47″E
- Elevation: 214.49 metres (703.7 ft)
- System: Indian Railway junction station
- Owner: Indian Railways
- Operator: Northern Railway
- Lines: Jalandhar–Firozpur line Lohian Khas–Phillaur line
- Platforms: 3
- Tracks: 4 nos 5 ft 6 in (1,676 mm) broad gauge

Construction
- Structure type: Standard on ground
- Parking: Yes
- Accessible: Wheelchair available

Other information
- Status: Functioning
- Station code: LNK
- Division(s): Firozpur

Passengers
- 2018: 989 per day
Location
- Location within Punjab

Lohian Khas Junction (station code: LNK) is located in Jalandhar district in the Indian state of Punjab and serves Lohian Khas town. Lohian Khas station falls under the Firozpur railway division of the Northern Railway zone of Indian Railways.

== Overview ==
Lohian Khas Junction railway station is located at an elevation of 215 metres (705 ft). This station is located on a single track, 5 ft 6 in (1,676 mm) broad gauge, on the Jalandhar–Firozpur line and Lohian Khas–Phillaur line.

== Electrification ==
Lohian Khas railway station is situated on single track DMU Jalandhar–Firozpur line and single track DMU Lohian Khas–Nakodar line. It was reported in Feb 2018 that the electrification of the single track BG Jalandhar–Firozpur line and the Lohian Khas–Nakodar line was in pipeline and union railways had budgeted funds for the same.

== Amenities ==
Lohian Khas railway station has 1 booking window, no separate enquiry office and just very basic amenities like drinking water, public toilets, sheltered area with adequate seating. The station had a small footfall of 989 persons per day in 2018. Wheelchair availability is there for disabled persons. There are three platforms at the station and one foot over the bridge (FOB).

== See also ==
- Jalandhar–Firozpur line
