= Bholu Wala, Ferozepur =

Bholu Wala
- Village
- Location in Punjab, India Bholu Wala (India)
- Coordinates: 30°49′58″N 74°52′48″E
- Country: India
- State: Punjab
- District: Ferozepur

Government
  - Type: Gram Panchayat

Population (2011)
  - Total: 1,112

Languages
  - Official: Punjabi
- Time zone: UTC+5:30 (IST)

Bholu Wala is a village in Firozpur district, Punjab, India. Bholu Wala village comes under Ghall Khurd tehsil.

== Demographics ==
The total population of Bholu Wala as per the 2011 census is 1,112 persons.
