= Diesel Loco Shed, Ludhiana =

Loco shed in Punjab, India

- LDH based Diesel Loco at Ludhiana junction

- Location within Punjab

Location
- Location: Ludhiana, Punjab
- Coordinates: 30°54′43″N 75°50′53″E

Characteristics
- Owner: Indian Railways
- Operator: Northern Railway zone
- Depot code: LDH (D)
- Type: Engine shed
- Rolling stock: WDS-6; WDM-3A; WDG-3A; WDG-4D; WDP-4B / WDP-4D

History
- Opened: 1970; 56 years ago
- Former rolling stock: WDM-2; WDM-3D; WAG-7

Diesel Loco Shed, Ludhiana is a motive power depot performing locomotive maintenance and repair facility for diesel locomotives of the Indian Railways, located at Ludhiana of the Northern Railway zone in Punjab, India.

== History ==
The shed was opened in 1977.

== Operation ==
Initially, the shed handed only WDM-2 and WDS-6 class locomotives, but it was gradually allocated WDM-3As and WDG-3As.

Being one of the three diesel engine sheds in Northern Railway, various major and minor maintenance schedules of diesel locomotives are carried out here. It has a sanctioned capacity of 175 engine units. Beyond the operating capacity, this shed houses a total of 198 engine units. Like all locomotive sheds, LDH does regular maintenance, overhaul and repair, including painting and washing of locomotives.

== Markings ==
LDH loco shed has its own logo and stencils. It is written on loco's body side as well as front and back.

== Locomotives ==
Serial no.	Locomotive class	Horsepower	Quantity
1.	WDM-3A	3100	57
2.	WDG-3A	3100	48
3.	WDP-4B/WDP-4D	4500	77
4.	WDG-4D	4500	26
5.	WDS-6	1400	8
Total locomotives active as of July 2025			216
