= Firozpur Junction =

Railway station in Punjab, India

Firozpur Cantonment
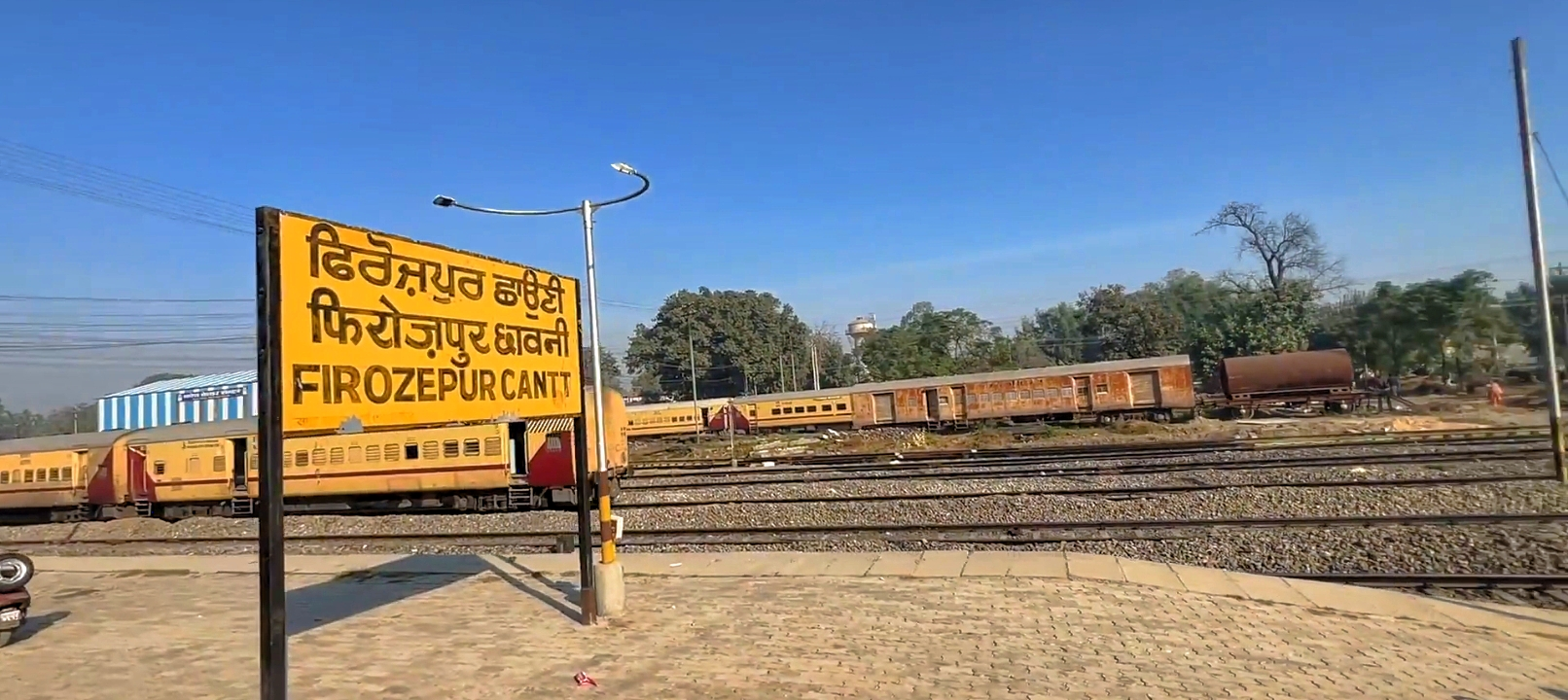
- Firozepur Cantonment Junction

General information
- Location: Station Road, near Mittal Chowk, Firozpur Cantonment, Punjab; India
- Coordinates: 30.9166°N 74.6°E
- Elevation: 200 metres (660 ft)
- System: Indian Railways junction station
- Owner: Indian Railways
- Operator: Northern Railway
- Lines: Ludhiana–Fazilka line, Delhi–Firozpur line, Jalandhar–Firozpur line
- Platforms: 6
- Tracks: 5 ft 6 in (1,676 mm) broad gauge

Construction
- Structure type: At grade
- Parking: Yes
- Cycle facilities: No

Other information
- Status: Functioning
- Station code: FZR
- Zone(s): Northern Railway
- Division(s): Firozpur

History
- Opened: 1905

Services
Preceding station	Indian Railways	Following station
Saidanwala towards ?	Northern Railway zone Ludhiana–Fazilka line	Firozpur City towards ?
Kasu Begu towards ?	Northern Railway zone Delhi–Firozpur line	Terminus
Terminus	Northern Railway zone Jalandhar–Firozpur line	Mallanwala Khas towards ?
Location
- Location within Punjab Location within India

Firozpur Cantonment Railway Station (station code: FZR) is located in Firozepur district in the Indian state of Punjab and serves Firozepur, on the banks of the Sutlej River.

== The railway station ==
Firozpur Cantonment railway station is at an elevation of 200 metres (660 ft) and was assigned the code – FZR.

== History ==
The Southern Punjab Railway Co. opened the Delhi–Bhatinda–Samasatta line in 1897. The line passed through Muktasar and Fazilka tehsils and provided direct connection through Samma Satta (now in Pakistan) to Karachi. The extension from the Macleodganj (later renamed Mandi Sadiqganj and now in Pakistan) railway line to Ludhiana was opened by the same company in 1905.

The Firozpur Cantonment-Jalandhar City branch line was opened in 1912.

== Railway division ==
Firozpur railway division covers a large area with railway lines under its jurisdiction – covering parts of Punjab, Jammu & Kashmir and Himachal Pradesh.

== Trains ==
Following express trains originate/terminate at Firozpur Cantt.

Train No.	Train name	Destination
12137 / 12138	Punjab Mail	Mumbai CST
13307 / 13308	Ganga Sutlej Express	Dhanbad
14621/14622	Firozpur Cantt. - Hazur Sahib Nanded Weekly Express	Hazur Sahib Nanded
14625 / 14626	Firozpur Cantt. - Haridwar Weekly Express	Haridwar
14619 / 14620	Tripura Sundari Express	Agartala
20973 / 20974	Rameswaram Humsafar Express	Rameswaram
