= Samma Satta =

- Town
- Location within Pakistan
- Coordinates: 29°21′0″N 71°32′6″E
- Country: Pakistan
- Province: Punjab
- District: Bahawalpur
- Tehsil: Bahawalpur

Samma Satta (Also spelled Samasatta or Samasata) (Urdu: سمہ سٹہ) is a town in Bahawalpur District, Punjab, Pakistan. It is located at 29°21'0 North 71°32'60 East and has an altitude of 351 feet (107 m).

== Railway ==
Samasata Junction railway station is located in center of the Samasatta town on the main railway line of Pakistan Railways. It was the junction of Samasata-Amruka via Bahawalnagar branch railway line. The train service on this branch railway line was closed in July 2011. This station is staffed and has a booking office. It is the stop of some express trains.

== Notables ==
Samasata is renowned for its Barfi, a traditional sweat.

== Notable Persons ==
General Joginder Jaswant Singh. 21st Chief of Indian Army, 2005-2007, 13th Arunachal Pradesh Governor.
