= Firozpur =

Firozpur Firōzpur (Punjabi)
- City
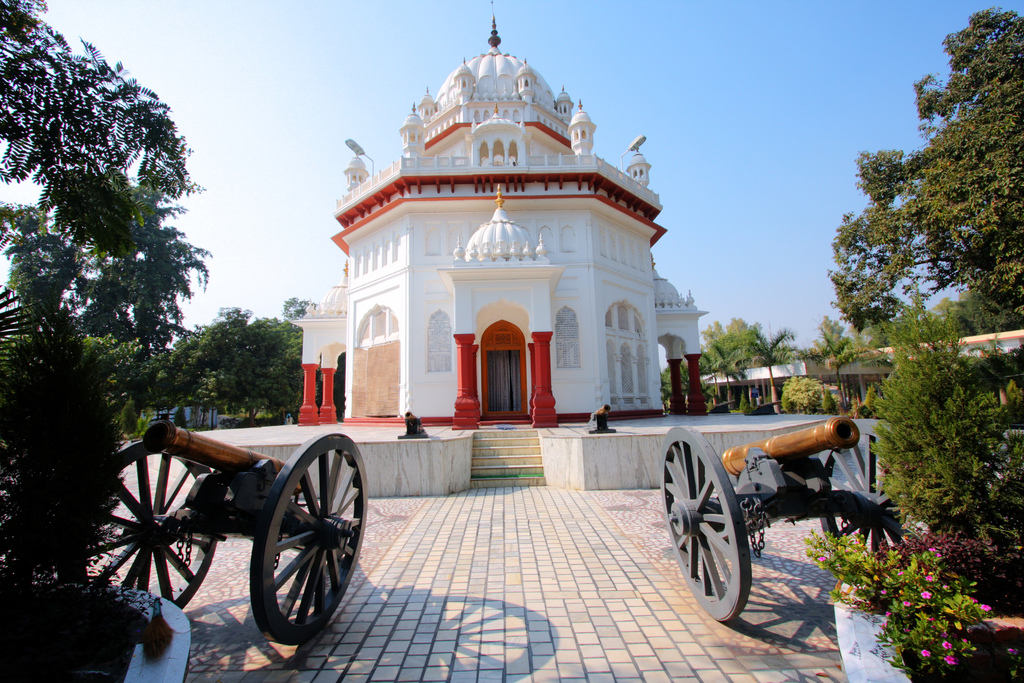
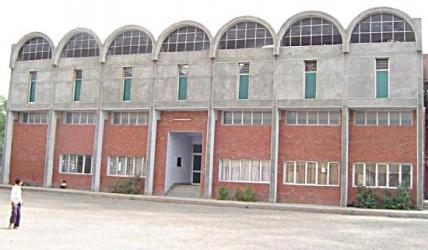
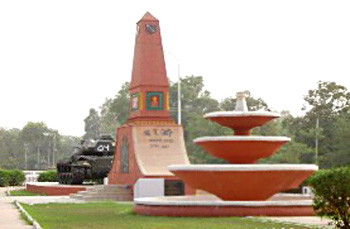
- Counterclockwise from top: Saragarhi Memorial in Firozpur, Shaheed Bhagat Singh Stadium, The Barki Memorial

- Location in Punjab, India Firozpur (India) Firozpur (Asia)
- Coordinates: 30.9166°N 74.6°E
- Country: India
- State: Punjab
- District: Firozpur
- Founded by: Firoz Shah Tughluq
- Named after: Firoz Shah Tughluq

Government
  - Member of Parliament: Sher Singh Ghubaya (INC)
  - Member of the Legislative Assembly (Urban): Ranbir Singh Bhullar(AAP)
  - Member of the Legislative Assembly (Rural): Rajnish Dahiya (AAP)
- Elevation: 182 m (597 ft)

Population (2011)
  - Total: 110,313
  - Density: 380/km^{2} (980/sq mi)
- Demonym(s): Firozpuri, Firozpuria

Languages
  - Official: Punjabi
- Time zone: UTC+5:30 (IST)
- PIN: 152001
- UNLOCODE: IN FIR
- Area code: 91-1632
- Vehicle registration: PB-05
- Literacy: 70.7%
- Lok Sabha constituency: Firozpur
- Vidhan Sabha constituency: Firozpur city
- Planning agency: PUDA
- Major Highways: NH95 SH15 SH 20
- Climate: BSh (Köppen)
- Avg. summer temperature: 29.7 °C (85.5 °F)
- Avg. winter temperature: 16.9 °C (62.4 °F)
- Precipitation: 731.6 millimetres (28.80 in)
- Website: ferozepur.nic.in

Firozpur, (pronunciation: [fɪroːz.pʊɾ]) also known as Ferozepur, (Note: There are various archaic and modern spellings of the city, such as Ferozepore, Ferozepur, Ferozpore, Ferozepur, Ferozpur, Firozpore, Firozpur, and others. The official spelling presently used by the government of the state of Punjab (India) is 'Firozpur'.) is a city on the banks of the Sutlej River in the Firozpur District of Punjab, India. After the Partition of India in 1947, it became a border town on the India–Pakistan border with memorials to soldiers who died fighting for India. The nearby Firozpur Cantonment is a major cantonment of the country.

== Etymology ==
The name, Ferozepore, is said to derive either from Feroz Shah Tughlaq, sultan of Delhi, or from a Bhatti chief, named Feroze Khan, who was a mid-16th century Manj Rajput chief. A popular name for the locality is Shaheedon-ki-dharti ("the land of martyrs").

== History ==
=== Early history ===
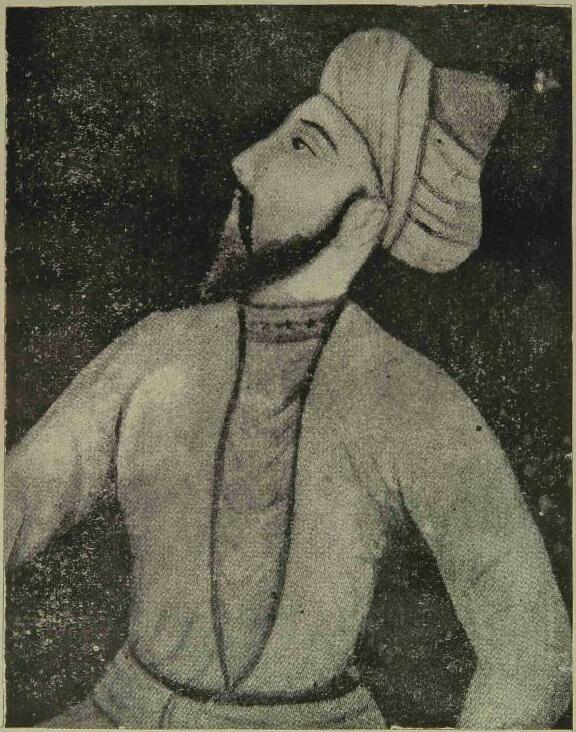
Painting of Sultan Firuz Shah Tughlaq. Kept in the collection of the Raza Library, Rampur.

The city of Firozpur was founded by Firoz Shah Tughlaq, a ruler of the Tughluq dynasty, who reigned over the Sultanate of Delhi from 1351 to 1388. The Ferozepur Fortress is said to have been constructed in the 14th century during the reign of Firoz Shah of the Delhi Sultanate. The Manj Rajput chief, Feroze Khan, was a prominent figure in the region in the mid-16th century. The locality's trade was dominated by the Bhabra Jain community. However, due to an epidemic in 1543, much of these traders shifted to Kot Ise Khan.

=== Sikh period ===
The period of Sikh influence in the region was affirmed in 1758, when Adina Beg was defeated by the Sikhs. In 1761, the Sikh chief Hari Singh of the Bhangi Misl captured Kasur and nearby areas of Ferozepore. One of the Bhangi sardars of Hari Singh, named Gurja (Gujar) Singh, along with his brother Nushaha Singh, and two nephews, Gurbakhsh Singh and Mastan Singh, took hold of Ferozepore for the Sikhs. Later, Gurja (Gujar) Singh gave Ferozepore to his nephew, Gurbakhsh Singh. The Ferozepore territory as it existed then contained 37 villages. In 1792, Gurbaksh Singh decided to divy up his territorial possessions among his four sons, with his second-son, Dhanna Singh, being bestowed control over the Ferozepore territory.

In ca.1818–19, Dhanna Singh died and therefore was succeeded by his widow, Lachhman Kaur. In 1820, Lachhman Kaur went on a pilgrimage to shrines of Haridwar, Gaya, and Jagannath after having placed her father-in-law, Gurbakhsh Singh, in charge of Ferozepore in her temporary absence. However, it was during this absence that Baghel Singh, nephew of the deceased Dhanna Singh, occupied the Ferozepore Fort under the guise of visiting his grandfather Gurbaksh Singh. After three years of travels, Lachhman Kaur returned to Ferozepore in 1823 to find that Baghel Singh has holed himself in the fortress and was unable to expel him. Therefore, she enlisted the help of the British East India Company to reclaim her possession of Ferozepore. Through the efforts of Captain Ross, the Deputy Superintendent of Sikh Affairs, whom represented her case to the Lahore agent representing the Sikh Empire, Maharaja Ranjit Singh gave orders to Baghel Singh to relinquish his antics, allowing Lachhman Kaur to return to her rule of Ferozepore. Baghel Singh died in 1826.

Lachhman Kaur died issueless on 28 September 1835 (another source gives her date of death as being December 1835). In July 1838, Jhanda Singh and Chanda Singh, the brothers of Baghel Singh and nephews of Dhanna Singh, both claimed the chiefship of Ferozepore. However, these attempts were unsuccessful and the Ferozepore territory lapsed into direct British-control. Henry Lawrence took full charge of the absorbed territory in 1839.

=== British control ===
British rule was first established in 1835, when, on the failure of heirs to the Sikh family who possessed it, a small escheat to the British government was formed, and the district was gradually formed around this nucleus. The British inherited Ferozepore at a time when its local economy was in-decline. In 1838, the population of the settlement of Ferozepore stood-at 2,732, however by 1841, the local population rose to 4,841. The increase in the population of Ferozepore in the period immediately following British annexation has been attributed to reforms by Henry Lawrence, who constructed a main market place and also built another market place towards the east of the old fortress.

The strategic importance of Ferozepur (as it was spelled under the British) was at this time very great, and in 1839 it was the outpost of British India in the direction of the Sikh power. It accordingly became the scene of operations during the First Anglo-Sikh War, in which the Sikhs crossed the Sutlej in December 1845, but were defeated and withdrew into their own territory, and peace was concluded with the Treaty of Lahore. Later, throughout the Indian Mutiny Ferozepur remained in the hands of the English.

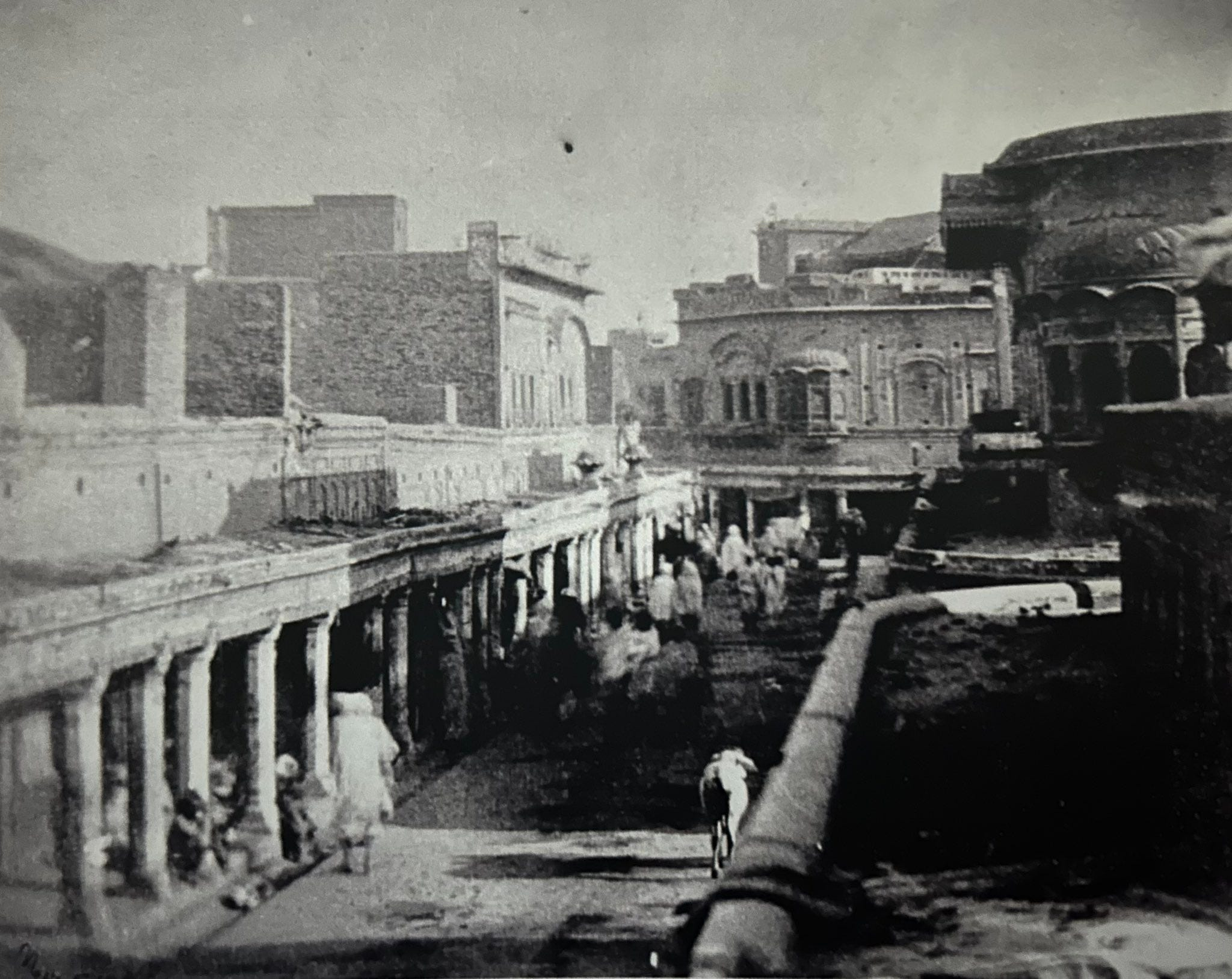
Photograph of a street-scene in Ferozepore, Punjab, 1856

The Arya Orphanage, providing shelter for orphans and the destitute spread over 21 acres, was established in Ferozepur on 26 October 1877 by Dayananda Saraswati, the founder of the Arya Samaj, after being invited by Rai Sahib Mathra Das. The orphanage would later be praised by Lala Lajput Rai and Lord C. R. Attlee.

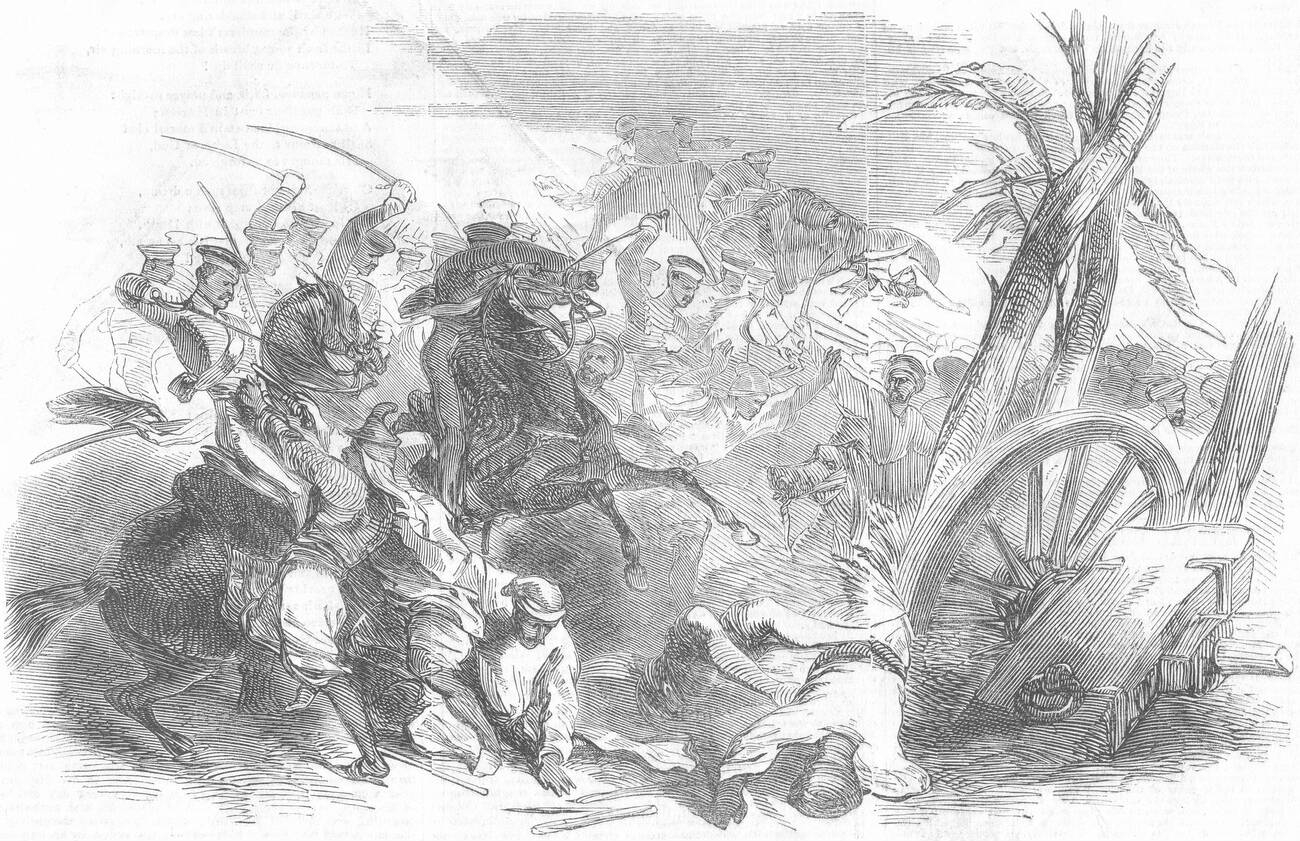
Battle of Ferozeshah - charge of the Bengal Light Cavalry, The Pictorial Times, 1846

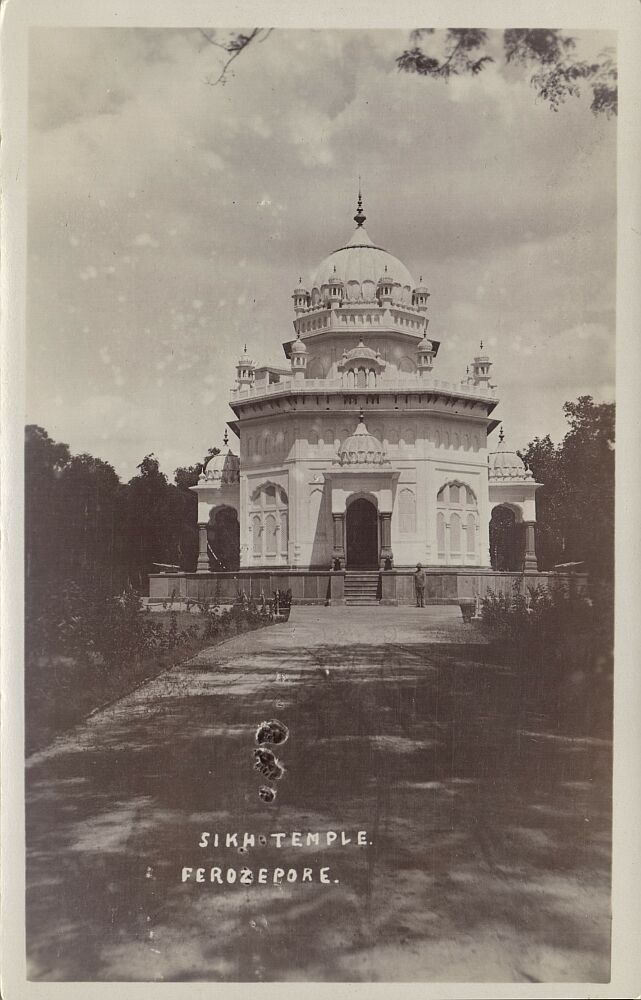
Postcard photograph of the Saragarhi Memorial Gurdwara in Firozpur, ca.1920's

The Saragarhi Memorial Gurdwara commemorates 21 Sikh soldiers of the 36th Sikh Regiment who died in the Battle of Saragarhi, defending the Saragarhi Fort against an overwhelming enemy force of 10,000 Pathan tribesmen on 12 September 1897. All 21 soldiers were awarded the Indian Order of Merit posthumously. The Saragarhi Memorial Gurdwara of Ferozepur was opened in 1904 by Sir Charles Montgomery Rivaz, the Lieutenant-Governor of Punjab.

On 23 March 1931, at 7.30 p.m., the remains of Bhagat Singh, Rajguru, and Sukhdev were cremated about 10 km north of Ferozepur on the bank of the Sutlej River at Hussainiwala. The location of the cremation went to Pakistan in 1947 but was given to India on 17 January 1961 when India and Pakistan exchanged their exclaves.

During British-rule, Firozpur was a key urban area that had economic, logistic, transport, and cultural connections to Kasur, Amritsar, and Lahore, a process that began in the second part of the 19th century that Harjap Singh Aujla describes as a "composite cultural triangle". A railway line was constructed to provided train connection between Firozpur, Kasur, and Lahore. British administrators preferred it due to it being less-crowded than either Lahore or Amritsar. The British administrators liked to reside in the Ferozepore Cantonment. During the partition, Hindu and Sikh refugees from the Kasur and Chunian tehsils of Lahore district utilized the Kasur-Ferozepore route to settle in the Republic of India.

Moti Bazar and Hira Mandi in Ferozepore were once prominent markets for the pearl and diamond trade. Prior to the partition in 1947, Hira Mandi was home to many singing girls.

=== Post-independence ===
In 1956, the Home for the Blind institute was established in Ferozepur to assist the blind.

A construction of a memorial at Hussainiwala dedicated to the three Indian freedom-fighters began and its foundation stone was laid on 23 March 1965, by the Union Defence Minister Y. B. Chavan. However, the Indo-Pakistani war of 1965 broke out in September the same year and work on the memorial stalled. In 1968, Chief Minister of Punjab, Lachman Singh Gill, completed the monument within 37 days at a cost of Rs 1.84 lakh. However, the monument was later vandalised by Pakistani troops in 1971–72. The monument was restored in 1973 by Giani Zail Singh.

The Barki Memorial, built in 1969, is a memorial to the soldiers of the 7 Infantry Division who died in a battle in 1965 which led to India taking the town of Barki, 15 miles south-east of Lahore.

Ferozpur fort, a Sikh Empire-era military structure located within the army cantonment of the city, was re-opened to the public after 200 years on 2 June 2025 by the Golden Arrow Division of the Army.

== Geography ==
Ferozepur is located on the bank of the Sutlej River.

=== Climate ===
Climate data for Firozpur
Month	Jan	Feb	Mar	Apr	May	Jun	Jul	Aug	Sep	Oct	Nov	Dec	Year
Mean daily maximum °C (°F)	19 (66)	21 (69)	26 (78)	34 (94)	38 (101)	39 (103)	34 (94)	33 (91)	33 (92)	32 (89)	26 (79)	21 (69)	30 (85)
Mean daily minimum °C (°F)	7 (44)	8 (47)	13 (55)	18 (65)	23 (73)	26 (79)	26 (79)	24 (76)	23 (74)	17 (63)	11 (52)	7 (45)	17 (63)
Average precipitation mm (inches)	20 (0.80)	38 (1.50)	30 (1.20)	20 (0.80)	20 (0.80)	61 (2.40)	229 (9.00)	188 (7.40)	86 (3.40)	5.1 (0.20)	13 (0.50)	20 (0.80)	730.1 (28.8)

== Demographics ==
Religion in Firozpur City
Religion	Percent
Hinduism	70.47%
Sikhism	26.25%
Christianity	2.35%
Islam	0.31%
Others	0.61%

As of the 2011 Indian Census, Firozpur had a total population of 110,313, of which 58,451 (53%) were male and 51,862 (47%) were female. 10.6% of the population was six years old or younger. The total number of literate people in Firozpur was 78,040, which constituted 70.7% of the population, with male literacy of 73.3% and female literacy of 67.9%. The effective literacy rate (population of 7 years and above) was 79.1%, of which the male literacy rate was 82.3% and female literacy rate was 75.6%. The Scheduled Caste population was 27,395. Firozpur had 22,263 households in 2011.

=== Religion ===
According to the 2011 census, out of a total population of 110,313 in Firozpur city, Hinduism is followed by 77,743 (70.5%) people and Sikhism by 28,961 (26.3%). Minority religions include Christianity, Islam, Jainism, and Buddhism.

Religious groups in Firozpur City (1881−2011) (Note: 1881-1941: Data for the entirety of the town of Firozpur, which included Firozpur Municipality and Firozpur Cantonment.)
Religious group	1881		1891		1901		1911		1921		1931		1941		2011	
Religious group	Pop.	%	Pop.	%	Pop.	%	Pop.	%	Pop.	%	Pop.	%	Pop.	%	Pop.	%
Hinduism	19,004	48.03%	23,047	45.69%	21,304	43.18%	21,542	42.38%	24,525	45.12%	28,253 (Note: 1931-1941: Including Ad-Dharmis)	43.71%	34,543	41.87%	77,743	70.47%
Islam	17,609	44.5%	22,018	43.65%	24,314	49.28%	23,409	46.05%	24,456	45%	28,464	44.04%	38,390	46.53%	342	0.31%
Sikhism	1,207	3.05%	3,387	6.72%	1,635	3.31%	2,951	5.8%	3,025	5.57%	4,439	6.87%	6,457	7.83%	28,961	26.25%
Jainism	72	0.18%	407	0.81%	301	0.61%	479	0.94%	476	0.88%	511	0.79%	630	0.76%	148	0.13%
Christianity	—N/a	—N/a	1,561	3.09%	1,753	3.55%	2,439	4.8%	1,855	3.41%	2,942	4.55%	1,533	1.86%	2,591	2.35%
Zoroastrianism	—N/a	—N/a	15	0.03%	4	0.01%	16	0.03%	14	0.03%	24	0.04%	—N/a	—N/a	—N/a	—N/a
Buddhism	—N/a	—N/a	0	0%	0	0%	0	0%	0	0%	1	0%	—N/a	—N/a	43	0.04%
Others	1,678	4.24%	2	0%	0	0%	0	0%	0	0%	0	0%	949	1.15%	485	0.44%
Total population	39,570	100%	50,437	100%	49,341	100%	50,836	100%	54,351	100%	64,634	100%	82,502	100%	110,313	100%

== Media ==
Firozpur has an All India Radio Relay station known as Akashvani Firozpur. It broadcasts on 100.1 MHz frequency.

== Economy ==
There are many markets in the town that are named after local figures and philanthropists. Some of these markets are Gali Dugglan, Mohalla Sodhian, Mohalla Baurianwala, Basti Shekhan, Basti Balochan, Hata Khuda Bakhsh, Kuchha Harnam Das, and Gali Kumrianwali.

== Education ==
There are a number of educational institutions within the town, such as:

- DAV College for Women
- Dev Samaj College for Women
- Dev Samaj College of Education for Women
- RSD College
- Guru Nanak College
- Shaheed Bhagat Singh College of Engineering and Technology

Some libraries are:

- Firozpur municipal library
- Firozpur district library
- Dronacharya library (located in the cantonment area, with a large book collection)

Aside from the above, there are two government schools, one dedicated toward a particular gender. There are two industrial training institutes, also dedicated to a particular gender. There is also a government polytechnic.

== Nature ==
The town was once home to many gardens, such as Tulsi Ram Bagh, Gole Bagh, Nishat Bagh, Ram Sukh Das Bagh, and Kanshi Ram Bagh. However, only Gole Bagh was under the control of the municipal government, with the majority of the gardens being held privately by residents or trusts. In around 1960, these trusts and individuals began getting rid of their garden-land as it became difficult to maintain them. Many fruit trees used to be found at Gole Bagh but now it is used as a garbage-dump.

== Places of worship ==
=== Gurdwaras ===
- Saragarhi Memorial Gurdwara, Ferozpur (Note: The Saragarhi Memorial Gurdwara of Firozpur is not to be confused with the Saragarhi Memorial Gurdwara located in Amritsar.)

=== Churches ===
- Saint Andrew’s Church, Jhoke Road
- Roman Catholic Church, Church Road
- Methodist Church, NBI Road, established by Missionaries of Methodist Denomination during 1925–30

== Notable people ==
- Susham Bedi, author
- Preet Bharara, attorney and media personality
- George Bigge, cricketer
- Lawrence Bishnoi, an Indian gangster
- Alexander Cadell, cricketer
- Sohraab Dhaliwal, cricketer
- Horatio Dumbleton, cricketer
- Sher Singh Ghubaya, politician
- Annie Gill, actress
- Balram Jakhar, politician
- Charles Kindersley, cricketer
- Zora Singh Maan, politician
- Verma Malik, lyricist
- Narain Chand Parashar, politician
- Bano Qudsia, writer
- Janmeja Singh Sekhon, politician
- Ajit Pal Singh, hockey player
- Gagan Ajit Singh, hockey player
- Ganda Singh, revolutionary
- Gurbaj Singh, hockey player
- Princepal Singh, basketball player
- Ronjan Sodhi, shooter
- Manav Vij, actor

== See also ==
- Bholu Wala, Ferozepur
