= Wagah =

Wagah: واگھا; واہگہ
- Union Council of Pakistan
- Wahga
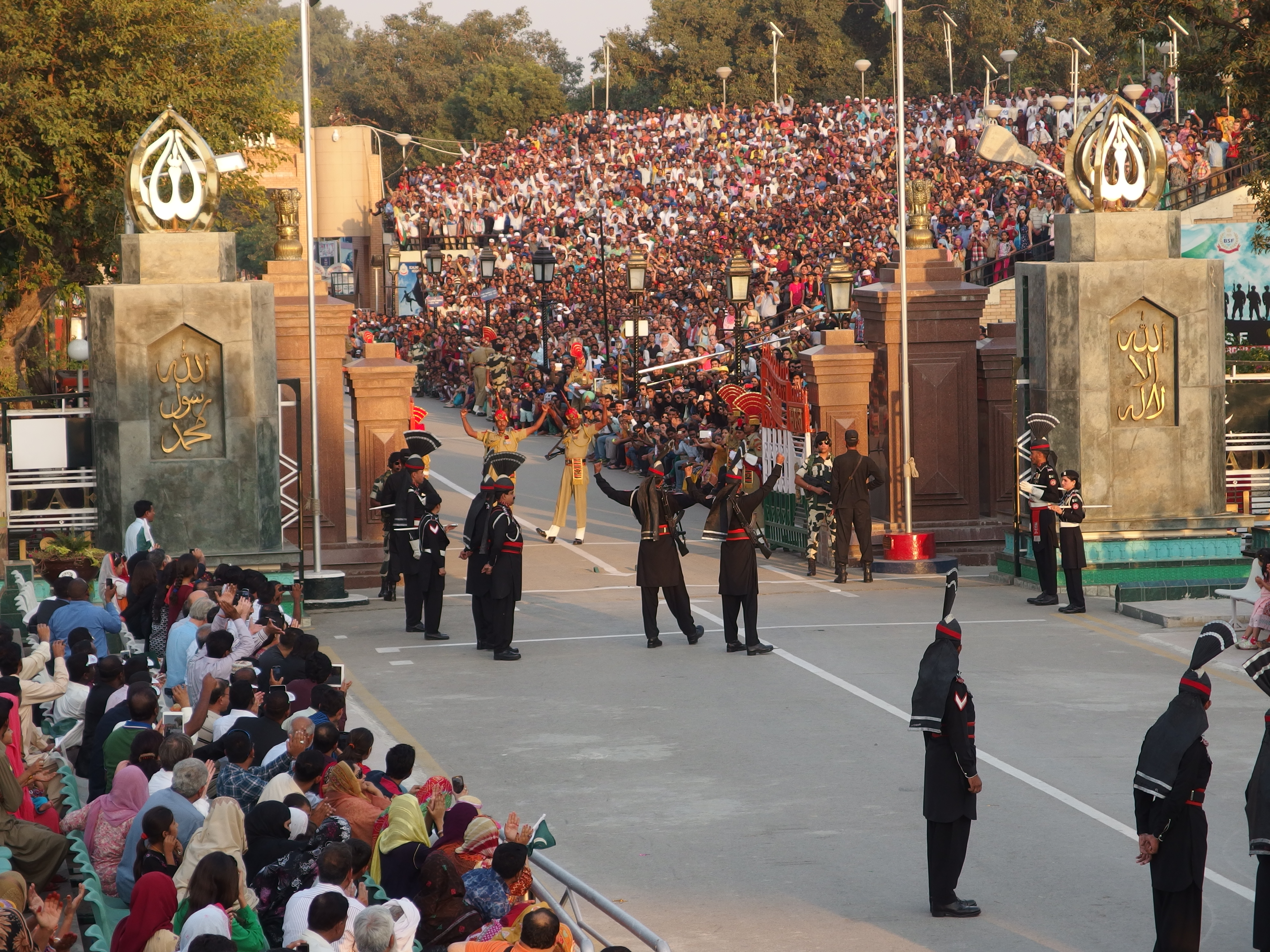
- The evening flag lowering ceremony at the Pakistan–India international border near Wagah

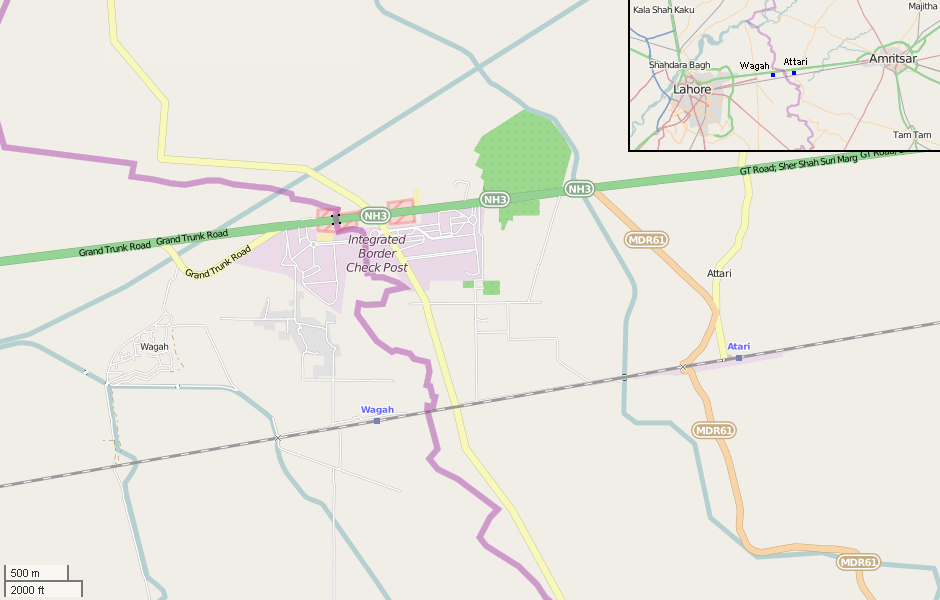
- Location of Wagah

- Location in Pakistan Wagah (Pakistan)
- Coordinates: 31°36′17″N 74°34′23″E
- Country: Pakistan
- District: Lahore
- Zone: Wahga Zone
- Union Council: 181

Population
  - Total: Cantonment village: 26,900; Municipal corporate council: 560,968; Border: 230,008
- Time zone: UTC+5 (PKT)

Wagah (/wɑːˈɡə/; Punjabi: واگھا [ʋäː˦ˈgä]; Urdu: واہگہ [ˈwɑːɦˌgɑː]), also spelled Wagha or Wahga, is a village and union council (UC 181) located in the Wahga Zone near Lahore City District, Pakistan. The town is famous for the Wagah border ceremony and also serves as a goods transit terminal and a railway station between Pakistan and India.

Wagah is situated 600 m (2,000 ft) west of the India-Pakistan border and lies on the historic Grand Trunk Road between Lahore and Amritsar in India. The border is located 24 km (15 mi) from Lahore and 32 km (20 mi) from Amritsar. It is also 3 km (1.9 mi) from the bordering village of Attari in India. The Wagah flag-lowering ceremony – by the border security personnel of Pakistan (Pakistan Rangers) and India (Border Security Force) has been taking place here every evening since 1959.

== Border ceremony ==
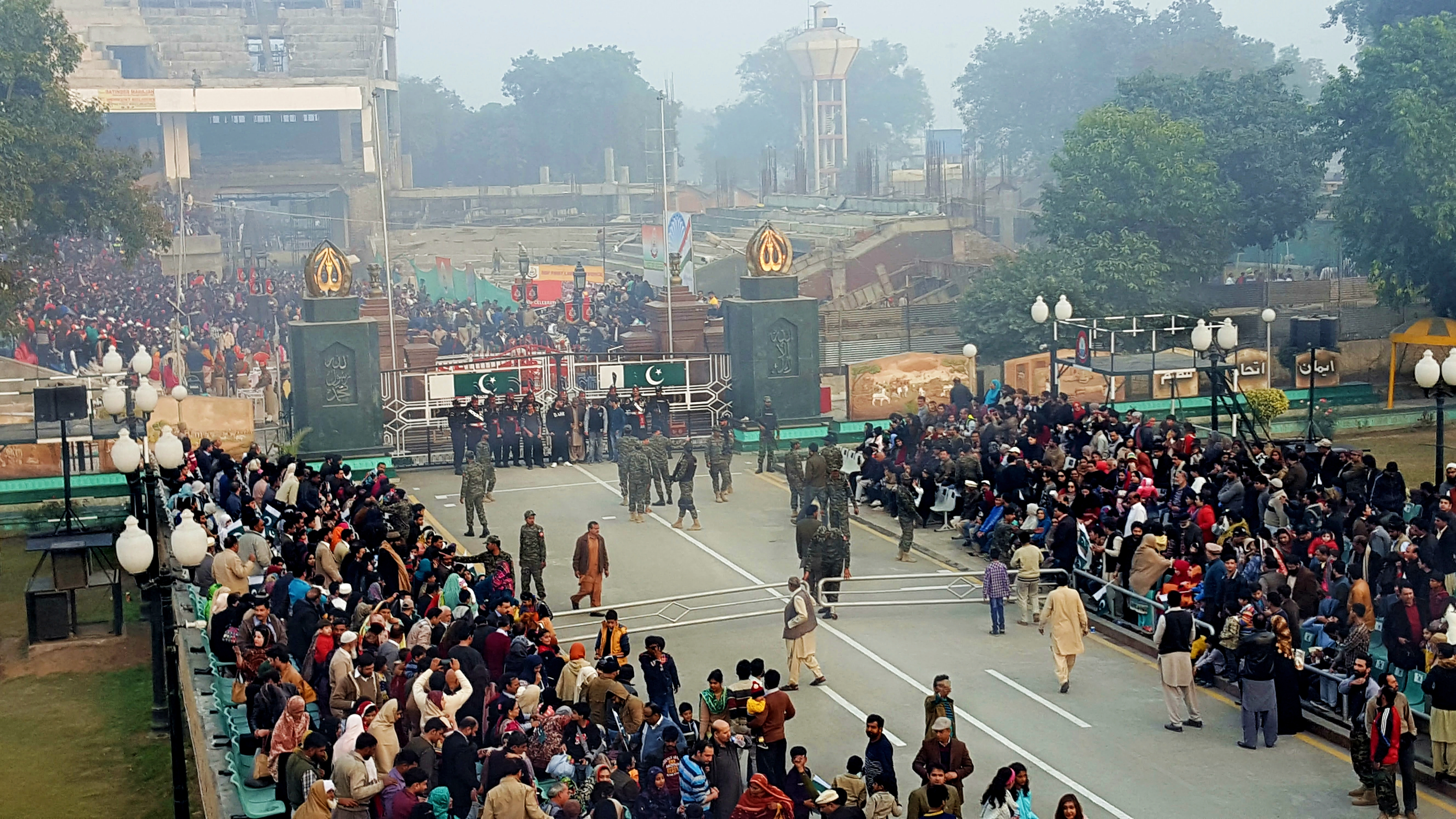
Flag ceremony in December 2016.

=== Border crossing ===
The border crossing draws its name from Wahga village, near which the Radcliffe Line, the boundary demarcation line dividing India and Pakistan upon the Partition of British India, was drawn. At the time of the independence in 1947, migrants from India entered Pakistan through this border crossing and vice versa. The Wagah railway station is 400 m (1,300 ft) to the south and 100 m (330 ft) from the border.

=== Border crossing ceremony ===
The Wagah-Attari border ceremony happens at the border gate, two hours before sunset each day. The flag ceremony is conducted by the Pakistan Rangers and Indian Border Security Force (BSF), similar to the retreat ceremonies at Ganda Singh Wala/Hussainiwala border crossing and Mahavir/Sadqi International Parade Ground border crossing. A marching ceremony, known as the "Silly Walk ceremony", is conducted each evening along with the flag ceremony. The ceremony started in 1986 as an agreement of peace, although there was not a conflict at that time.

== Gallery ==
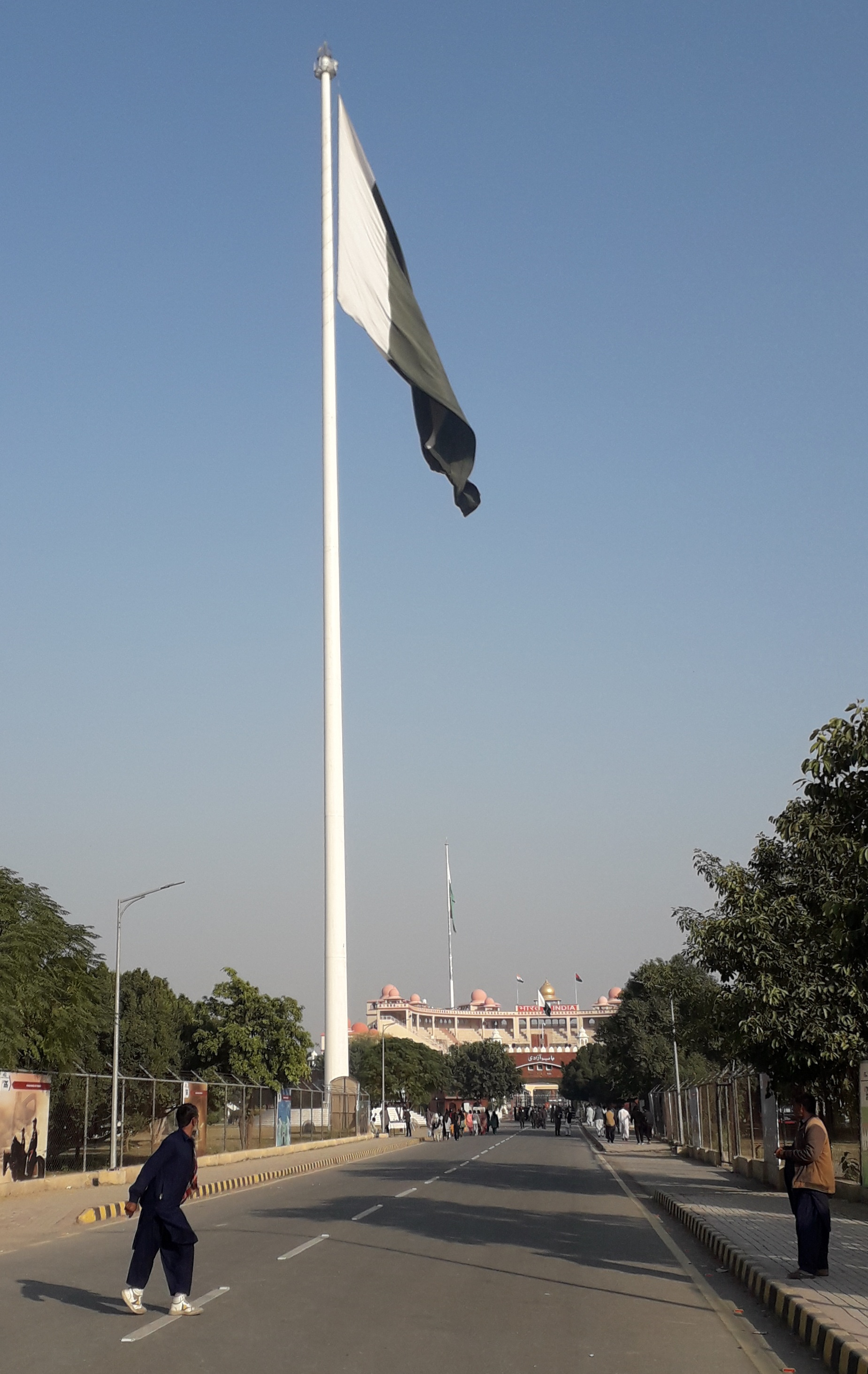
122m high Pakistani flag on Wagah Border

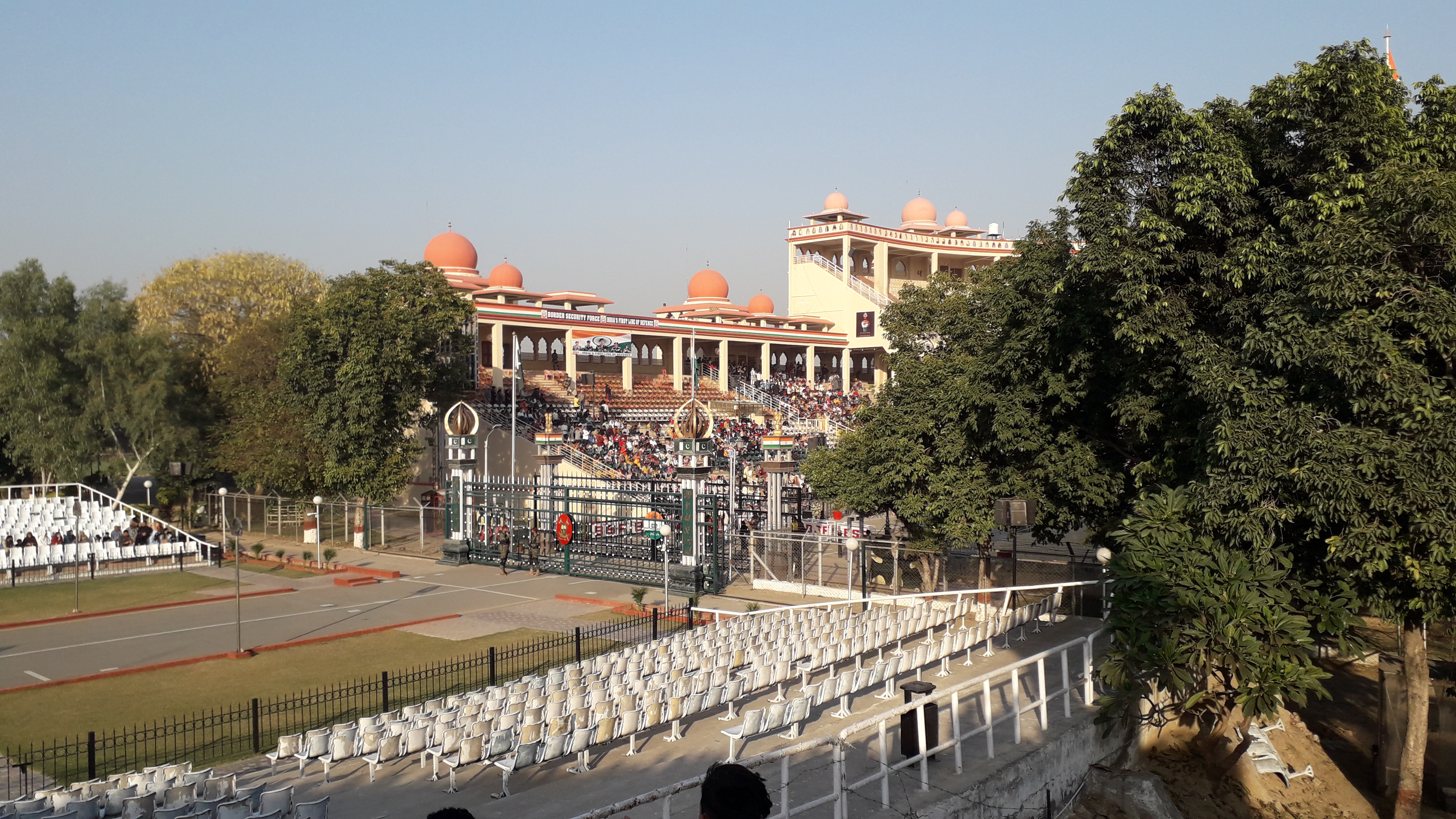
Stadium-like seating at Pakistani side of the border

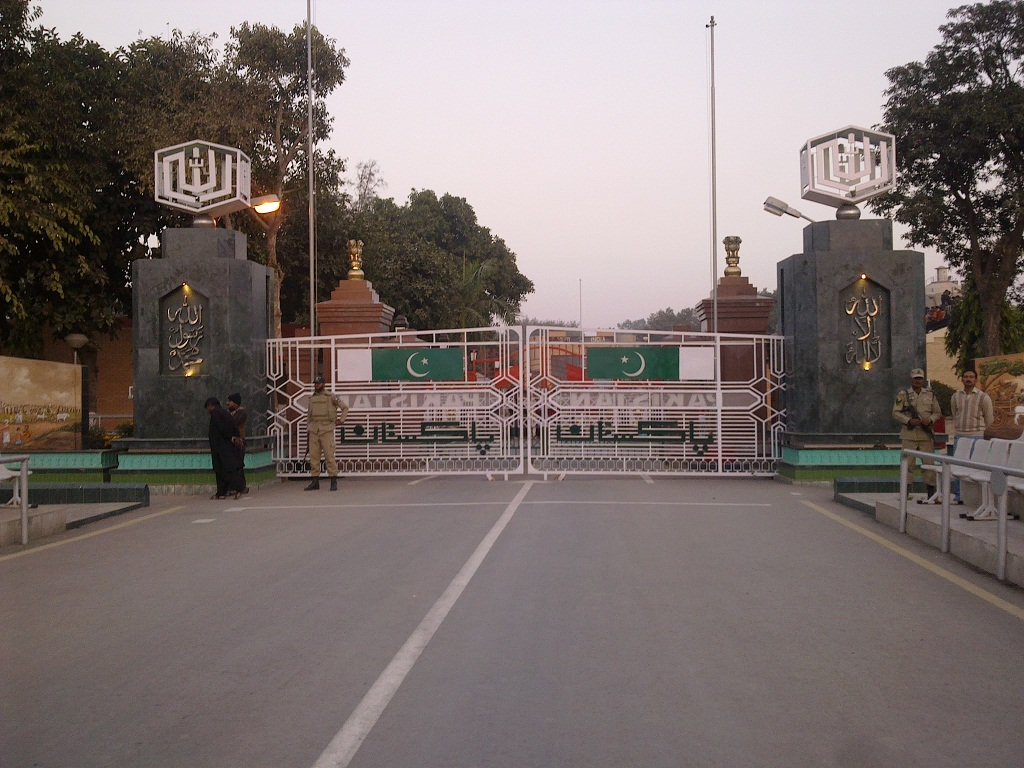
The Pakistani gate at the border crossing

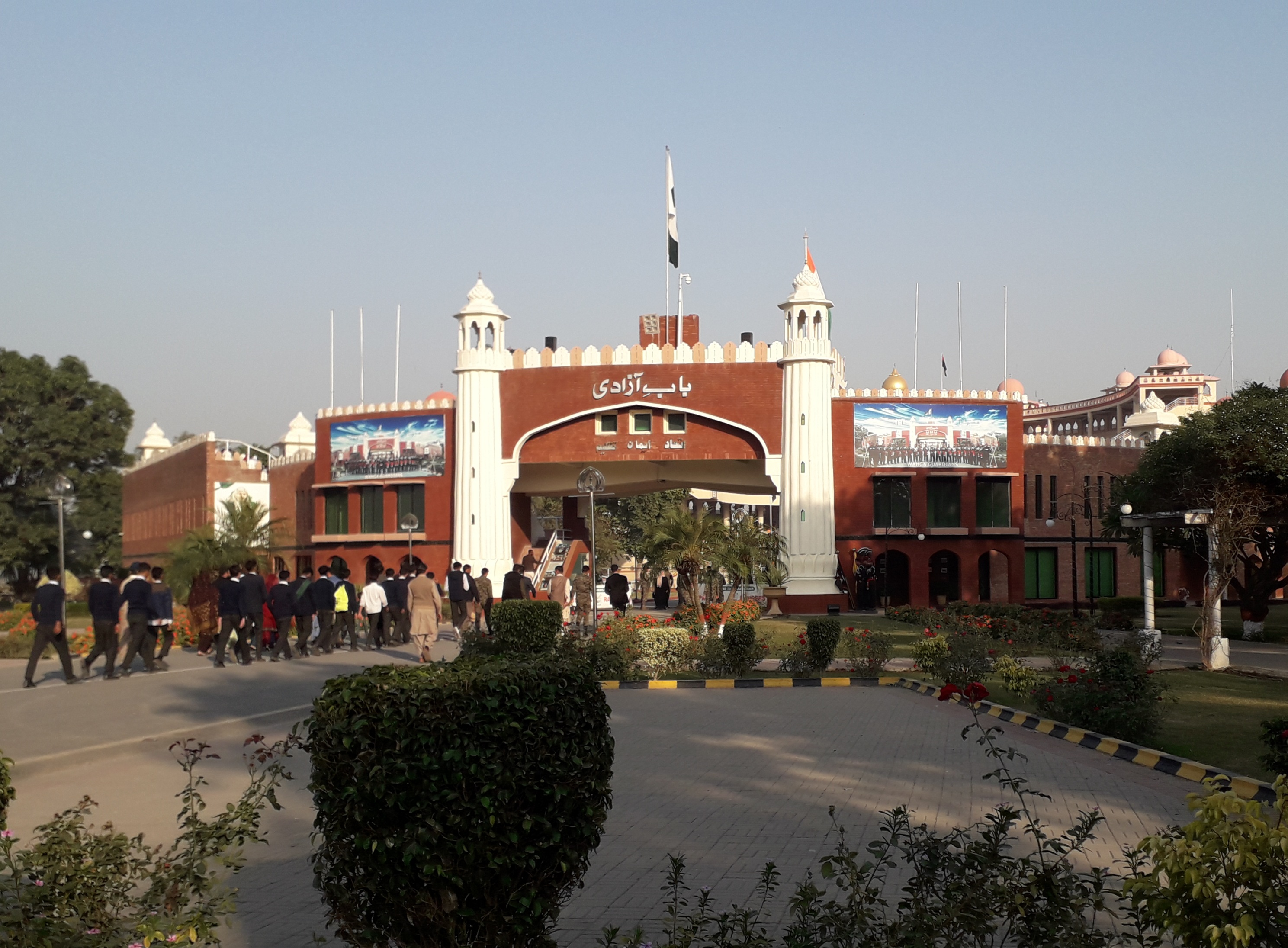
Bab-e-Azadi (Gate of Independence) on Pakistani side of Wagah Border

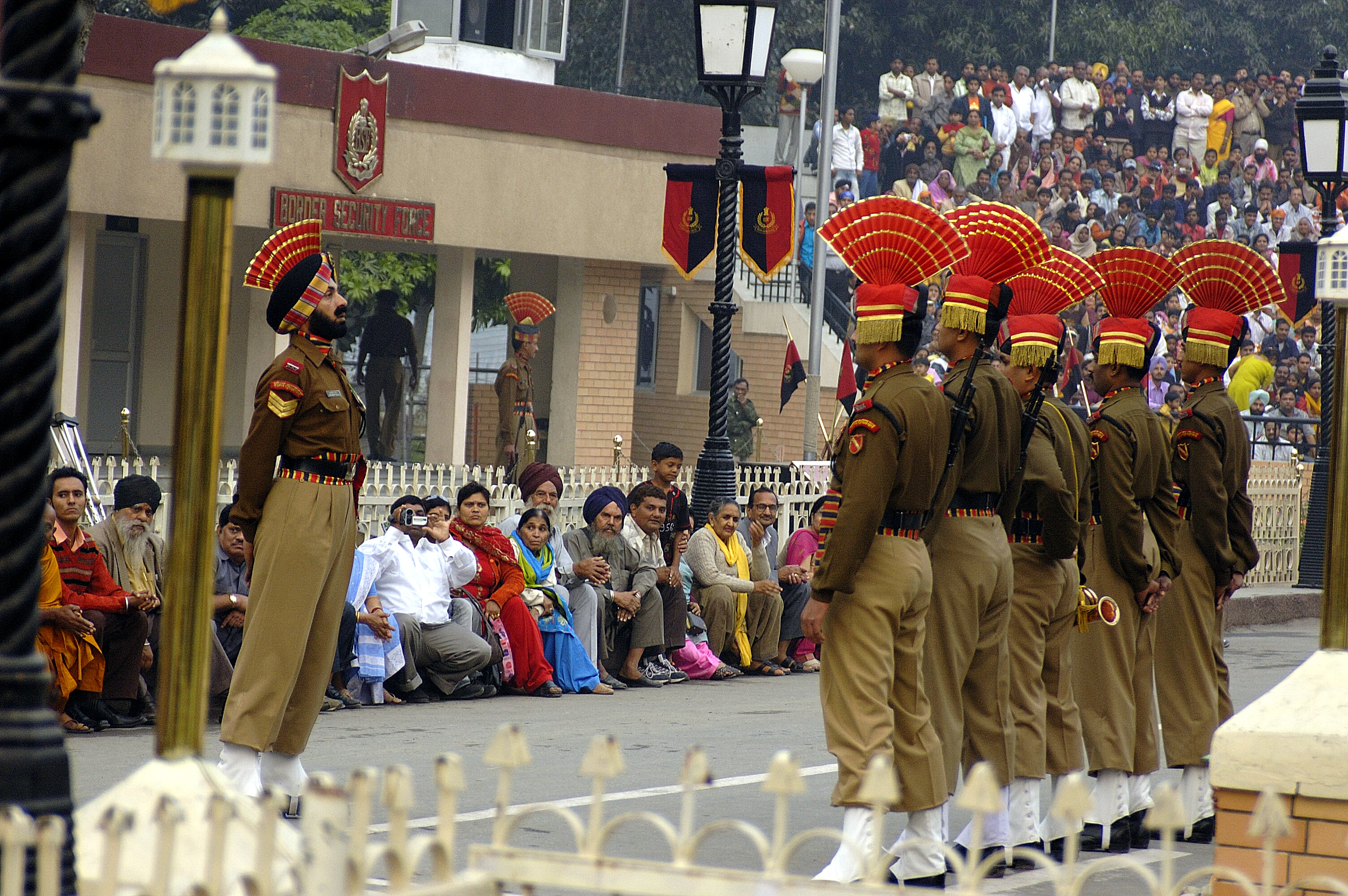
Indian BSF at Wagah

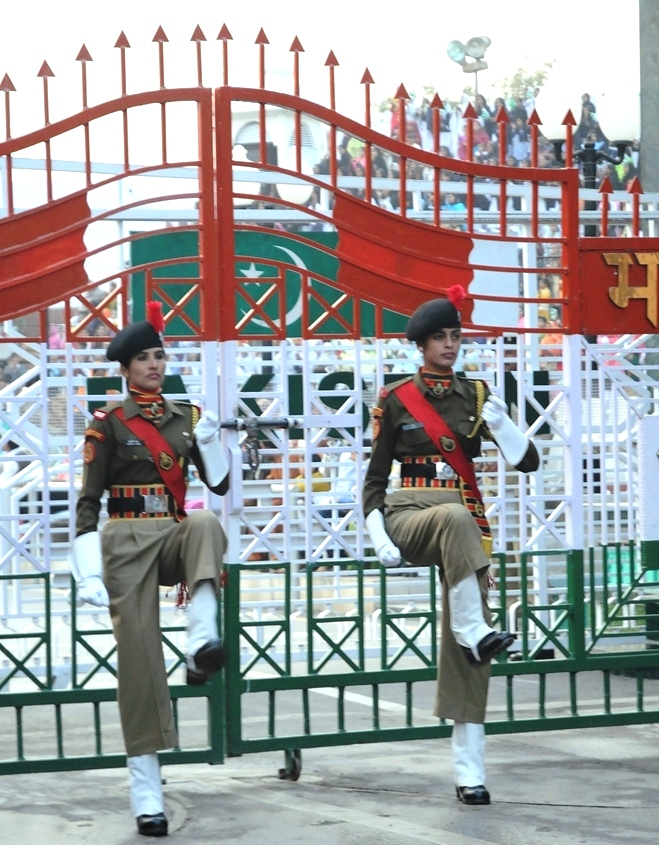
Women personnel of Indian BSF at Wagah

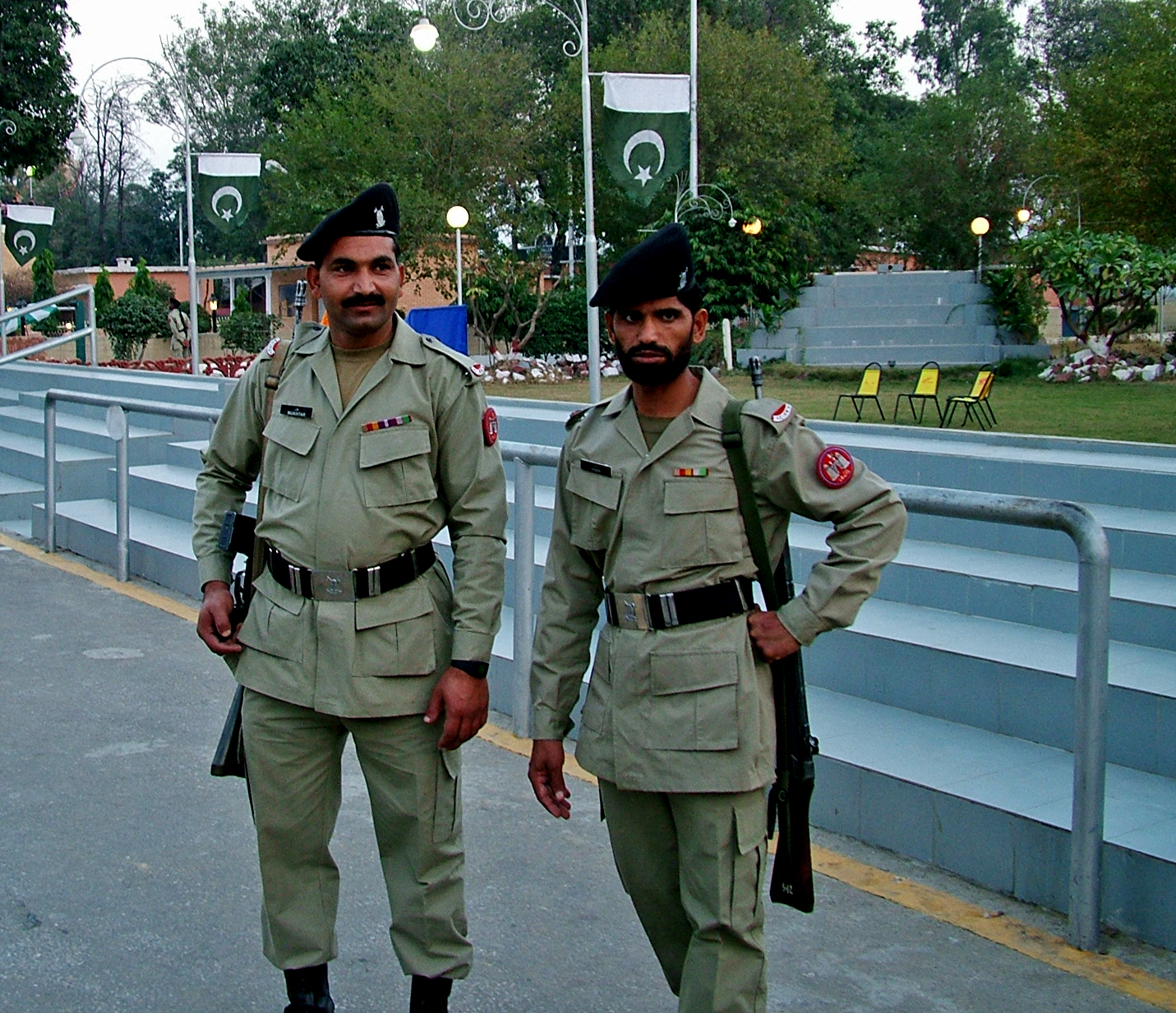
Punjab Rangers at Waga

== See also ==
- Wagha railway station
- Lahore–Wagah Branch Line
- 2014 Wagah border suicide attack
- Khyber Pass
- Manhala
- Grand Trunk Road
- Canal Bank Road
