= PP-178 Kasur-IV =

Former constituency of the Punjabi Provincial Legislature, Pakistan

- Constituency for the Provincial Assembly of Punjab
- Region: Kasur Tehsil (partly) including Ganda Singh Wala village of Kasur District

Current constituency
- Created: 2002
- Created from: PP-178 Kasur-IV (2002-2018) (2023-present)

PP-178 Kasur-IV (پی پی-178، قصور-4) is a Constituency of Provincial Assembly of Punjab. It was abolished after 2018 delimitations. Kasur District lost 1 seat after 2017 Census and continued after Kasur gained 1 seat in 2023 Census.

== General elections 2024 ==
Provincial election 2024: PP-178 Kasur-IV
Party	Candidate	Votes	%	±%
PML(N)	Malik Ahmad Saeed Khan	54,942	42.45	
Independent	Shahid Masood (Note: Filed nomination papers as PTI candidate but ECP allowed him to run as an Independent)	49,127	37.96	
TLP	Hafiz Muneeb Ahmad	12,055	9.31	
PPP	Shaheem Safdar	8,010	6.19	
PMML	Nasir Mehmood	3,004	2.32	
Others	Others (seventeen candidates)	2,292	1.77	
Turnout		133,137	61.60	
Total valid votes		129,430	97.22	
Rejected ballots		3,707	2.78	
Majority		5,815	4.49	
Registered electors		216,127		
hold				

== General elections 2013 ==
Provincial election 2013: PP-178 Kasur-IV
Party	Candidate	Votes	%	±%
PML(N)	Malik Ahmad Saeed Khan	34,335	38.46	
Independent	Shahid Masood Ali	17,815	19.96	
PTI	Sardar Fakhir Ali Advocate	10,560	11.83	
JI	Sardar Faisal Zaib	8,381	9.39	
Jamiat Ulema-e-Pakistan	Sardar Sarfraz Ahmad Dogar	7,120	7.98	
Independent	Choudhary Mubashar Nawaz	6,040	6.77	
PPP	Choudhary Ahmad Ali	2,946	3.30	
Others	Others (eleven candidates)	2,075	2.32	
Turnout		93,234	63.66	
Total valid votes		89,272	95.75	
Rejected ballots		3,962	4.25	
Majority		16,520	18.50	
Registered electors		146,464		

== General elections 2008 ==
Contesting candidates	Party affiliation	Votes polled

== See also ==
- PP-177 Kasur-III
- PP-179 Kasur-V
