= Mahavir/Sadqi International Parade Ground =

Coordinates: 30°22′00″N 73°53′07″E

Mahavir International Parade Ground (also called the Sadqi International Parade Ground) at Sadqi village 14 km from Fazilka City in Fazilka district of Punjab state of India, holds the beating retreat (lowering of the flags) ceremony. Across the border in Pakistan, is the Sulemanki village 45 km from Depalpur City of Okara district of Punajab provice of Pakistan. This ceremony on the Indian side, similar to the Attari-Wagah border ceremony and Firozpur (Hussainiwala) National Martyrs Memorial, is a daily retreat ceremony ritual in which the security forces of India (Border Security Force) and Pakistan (Pakistan Rangers) are performing daily joint ceremonial drill.

It is alternatively a symbol of the two countries' rivalry, as well as brotherhood and cooperation.

== Overview ==
It is on the former National Highway no. 10 and about 14 km from the district’s headquarters, Fazilka.

== See also ==
- Borders of India
- Look-East Connectivity projects
- Look East policy (India)
