= Attari–Wagah border ceremony =

Daily military border ceremony involving India and Pakistan

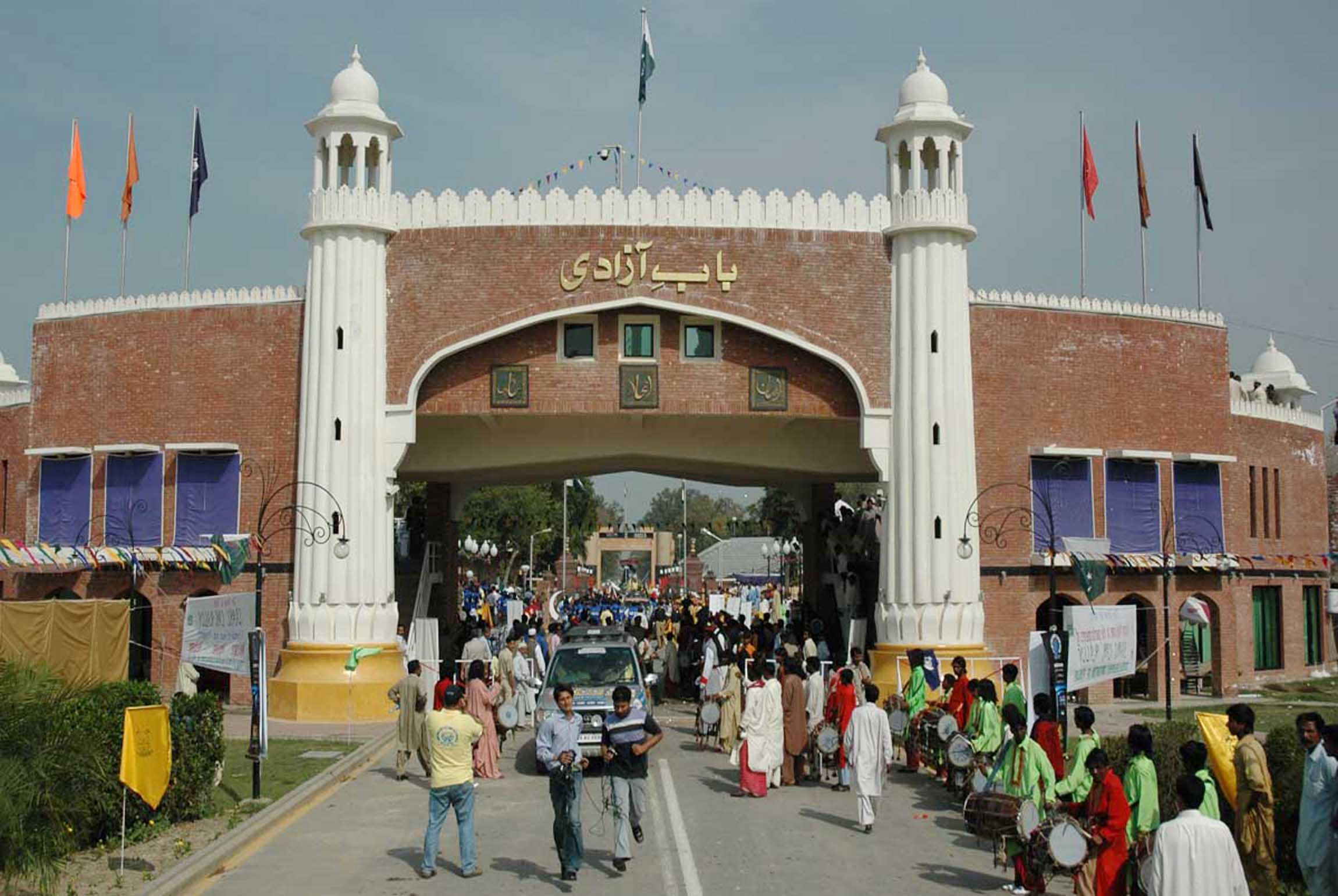
- Attari-Wagah border, Pakistan side

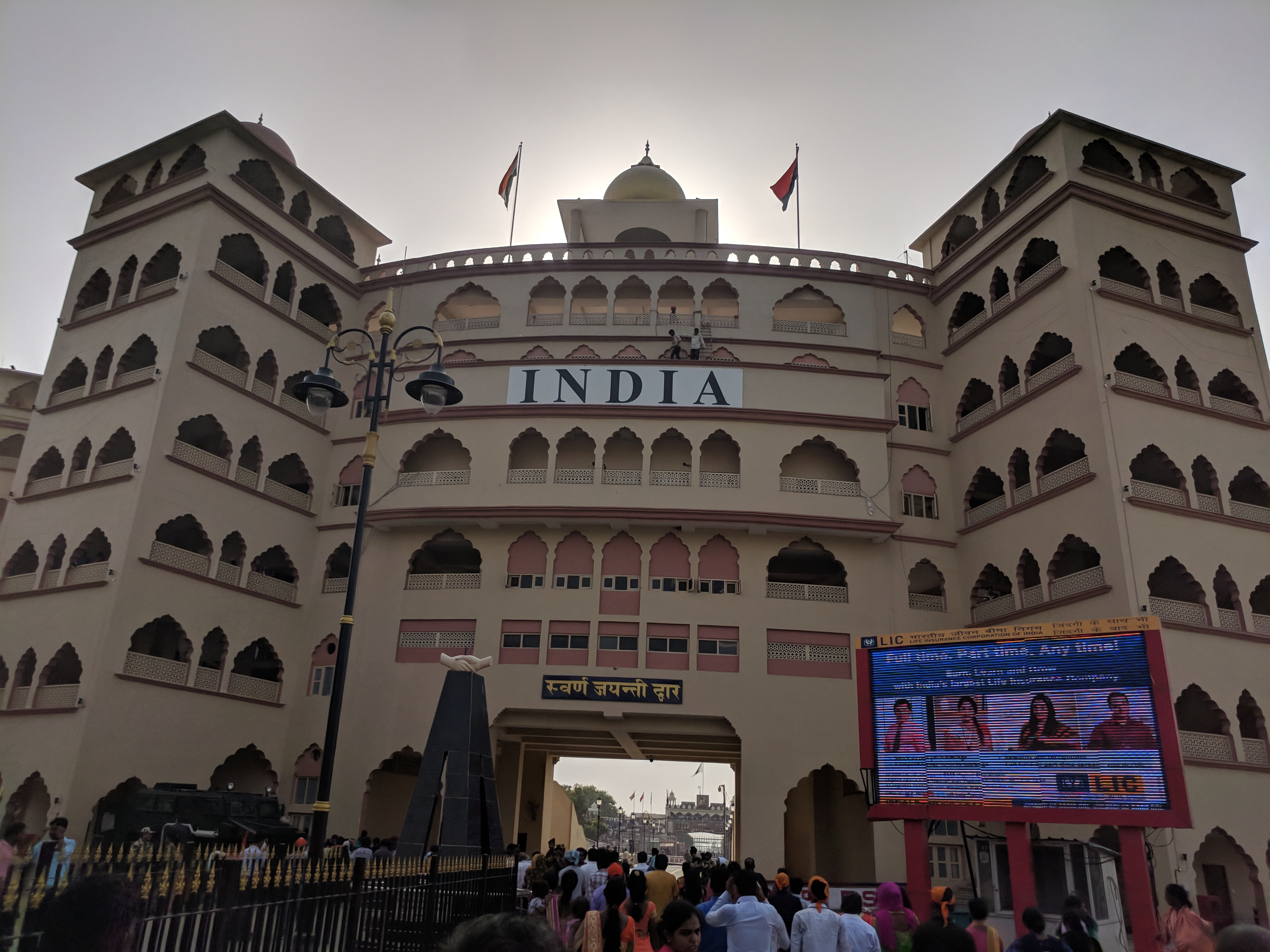
- Attari-Wagah border, India side
- Genre: Military display
- Dates: Daily
- Locations: India–Pakistan border, more specifically, Attari and Wagah
- Coordinates: 31°36′17″N 74°34′23″E
- Years active: 1959–present
- Founded: Border Security Force and Pakistan Rangers
- Founders: Major General Mohinder Singh Chopra and Brigadier Nazir Ahmed

The ceremony at the Attari–Wagah border is a daily ceremony that the security forces of India (Border Security Force) and Pakistan (Pakistan Rangers) have jointly followed since 1959. The drill is characterized by elaborate and rapid dance-like manoeuvres and raising legs as high as possible. It is symbolic of the brotherhood as well as the rivalry that these two nations share. The border troops exchange sweets with the opposing side during the Muslim holidays of Eid and Hindu holiday of Diwali.

The flag lowering ceremony at the village of Wagah is held each evening immediately before sunset. The ceremony begins with battle calls from both sides in the form of loud screaming by the border guards. This is followed by a series of organized high kicks, stomps, and dance moves during which the opposing forces stare each other down. The event ends with a handshake of good faith being exchanged by the head guards along with the lowering of the flags.

It has been a peaceful gathering with the exception of the 2014 Wagah border suicide attack claimed by three outlawed rival Islamist groups in which 60 people were killed and over 110 people were left injured. It has also been cancelled on occasion such as when Pakistan returned Wing Commander Abhinandan Varthaman back to India after his plane was shot down by the Pakistan Air Force (PAF) during the 2019 India–Pakistan standoff. It was also stalled for several days from 8 May 2025 due to the 2025 Pahalgam terrorist attack which killed 26 civilians.

Similar India–Pakistan border ceremonies are also organised at several other places, such as the Mahavir/Sadqi border near Fazilka in Punjab, the Hussainiwala/Ganda Singh Wala border near Firozpur in Punjab, and Munabao–Khokhrapar border ceremony in Barmer district in Rajasthan. India's border with other nations, such as Bangladesh and China, also has similar ceremonies.

== History ==
The ceremony was founded by Brigadier (later Major General) Mohinder Singh Chopra and Brigadier Nazir Ahmed on 11 October 1947. It was marked by three drums, a chalk line on the Grand Trunk Road and a check post. Some tents were pitched both sides, two sentry boxes painted in the national colours of each country and a gate to regulate traffic for the refugees. Two flag masts were also put up on either side and a brass plate commemorating the historic event was installed with both their names below the flags.

== Overview ==
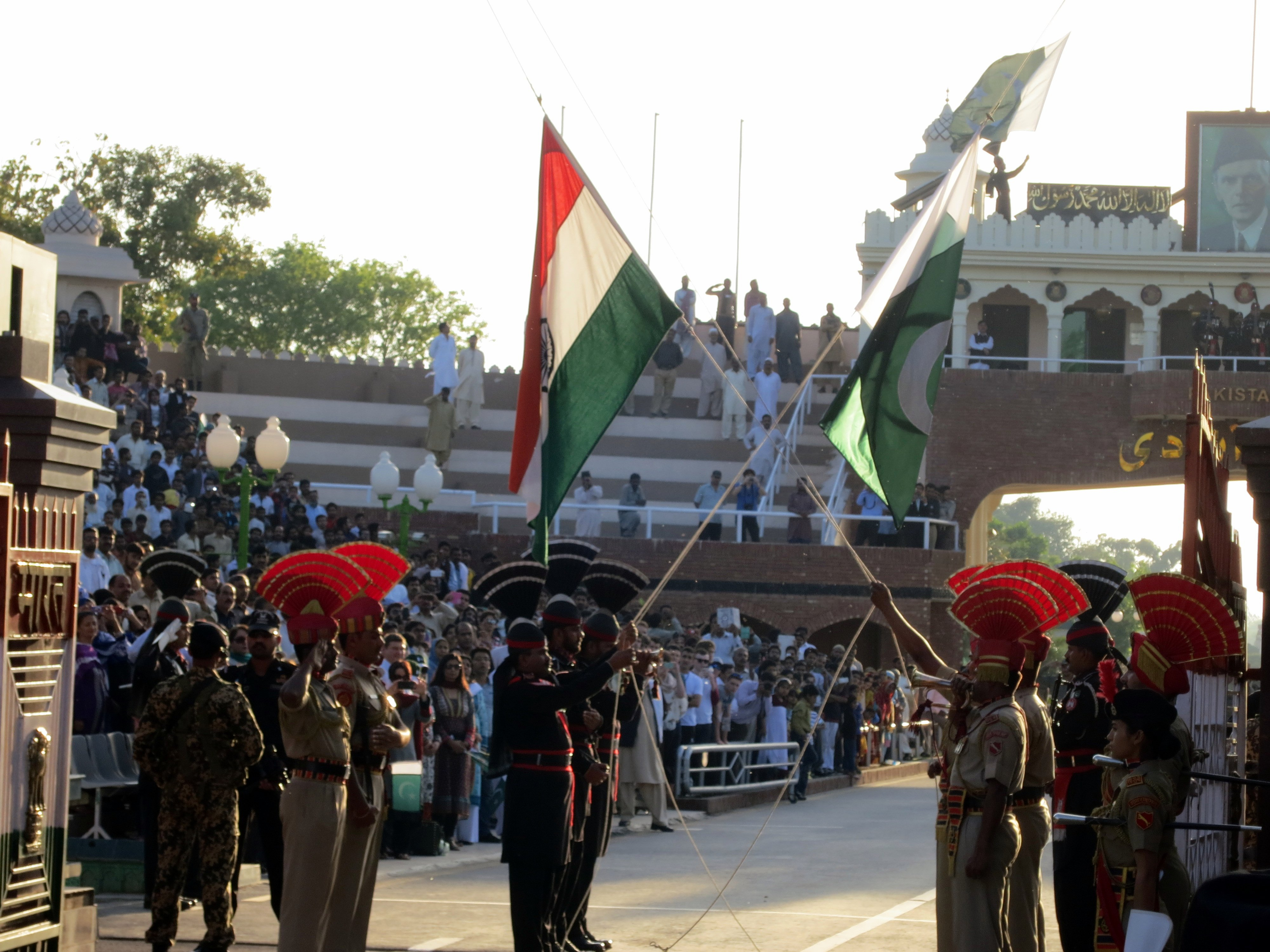
The Attari–Wagah border ceremony at the border crossing

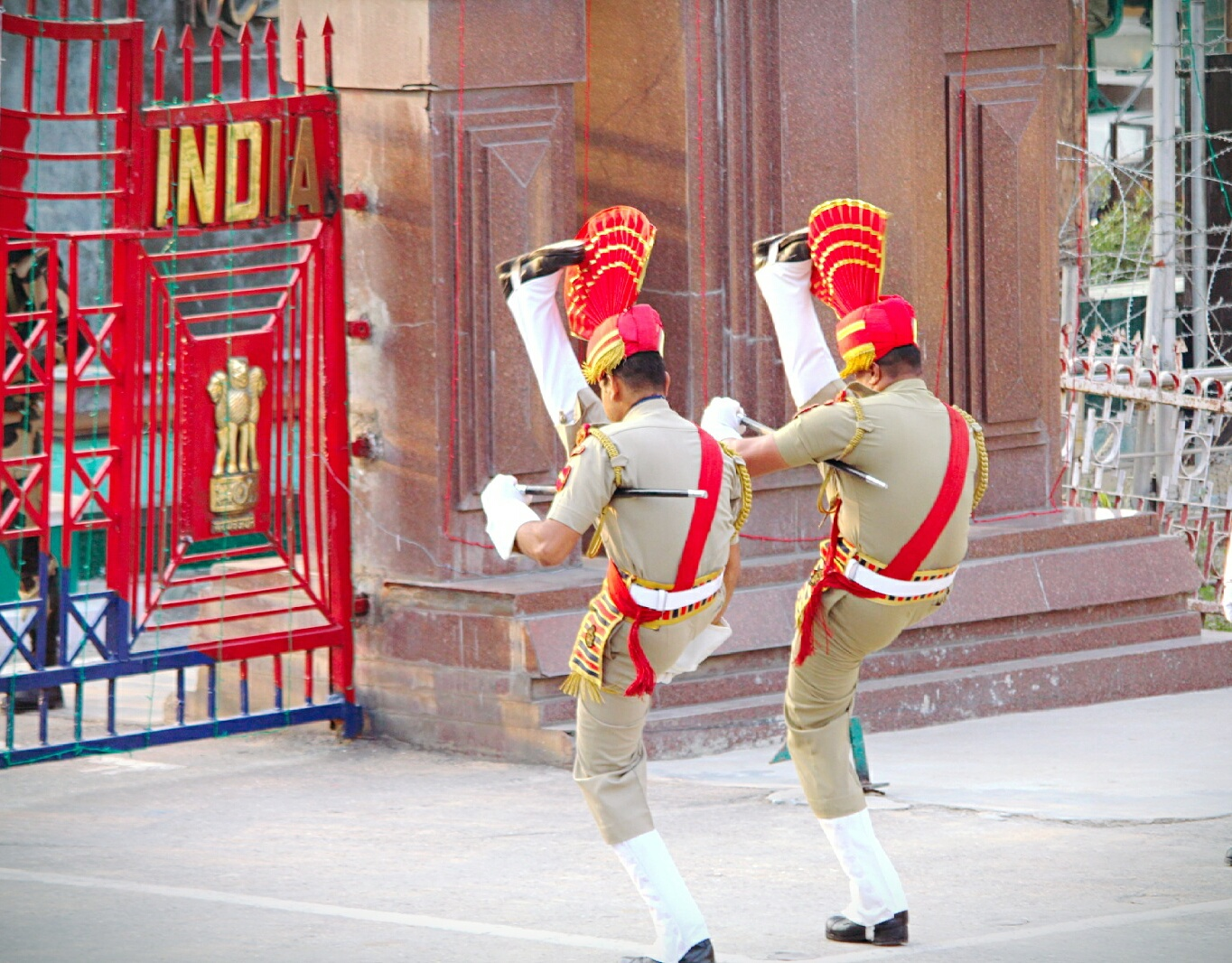
Marching by Indian Border Security Force soldiers at the Attari border crossing

This ceremony takes place at the Attari–Wagah border, which is part of the Grand Trunk Road. Prior to the opening of the Aman Setu in Kashmir in 1999, it was the only road link between these two countries. It is called a Beating Retreat border ceremony on the international level.

The ceremony starts every evening immediately before sunset with a blustering parade by the soldiers from both sides, and ends with the perfectly coordinated lowering of the two nations' flags. One infantryman stands at attention on each side of the gate. As the sun sets, the iron gates at the border are opened and the two flags are lowered simultaneously. The flags are then folded, and the ceremony ends with a retreat that involves a brusque handshake between soldiers from either side, followed by the closing of the gates again. The spectacle of the ceremony attracts many visitors from both sides of the border, as well as international tourists. In 2010, the ceremony was made less hostile by both sides; the ceremony now includes a handshake and a smile. In October 2010, Major General Yaqub Ali Khan of the Pakistan Rangers decided that the aggressive aspect of the ceremonial theatrics should be toned down. The soldiers of this ceremony are specially appointed and trained for this ceremony.

== Incidents ==
=== 2014 suicide attack ===
On 2 November 2014, approximately 60 people were killed and at least 110 people were injured in a suicide attack on the Pakistan side of Attari–Wagah border. A suicide bomber detonated a 25 kg (55 lb) explosive in his vest 600 metres (2,000 ft) from the crossing point in the evening after the ceremony ended. The attack was claimed by three rival Islamist militant groups.

=== 2016 tensions ===
After the India–Pakistan military confrontation on 29 September 2016, the border closing ceremony continued, but on the Indian side public attendance was denied on the evenings between 29 September and 8 October 2016. As a sign of the increased tensions, the BSF did not exchange sweets and greetings with Pakistani Rangers on Diwali that year, despite a long tradition of doing so on major religious festivals like Bakr-Eid and Diwali, and also during Independence Days of both countries.

=== 2025 tensions ===
Amid skirmishes between Indian and Pakistani forces following the Pahalgam Terror Attack and Operation Sindoor, the Beating Retreat was indefinitely paused on 8 May 2025.

The ceremony resumed in a limited capacity on 20 May 2025, without the usual handshakes and distribution of sweets.

== Other places ==
Similar border ceremonies are also carried out at other India–Pakistan border posts, including at Ganda Singh Wala, Kasur district (Pakistani side) / Hussainiwala, Firozpur district (Indian side), and at Sulemanki, Okara district (Pakistani side) / Sadqi, Fazilka district (Indian side).

As at the Attari–Wagah border, border soldiers from both sides intimidate each other by throwing high kicks and staring, and the ceremonies are concluded by a simultaneous flag or beating retreat. These ceremonies occur in smaller settings, and spectators tend to be local Punjabis rather than tourists from other regions in India, Pakistan, and other countries. The method of drill and parade is also quite different compared to that in the Wagah–Attari border.

== Gallery ==
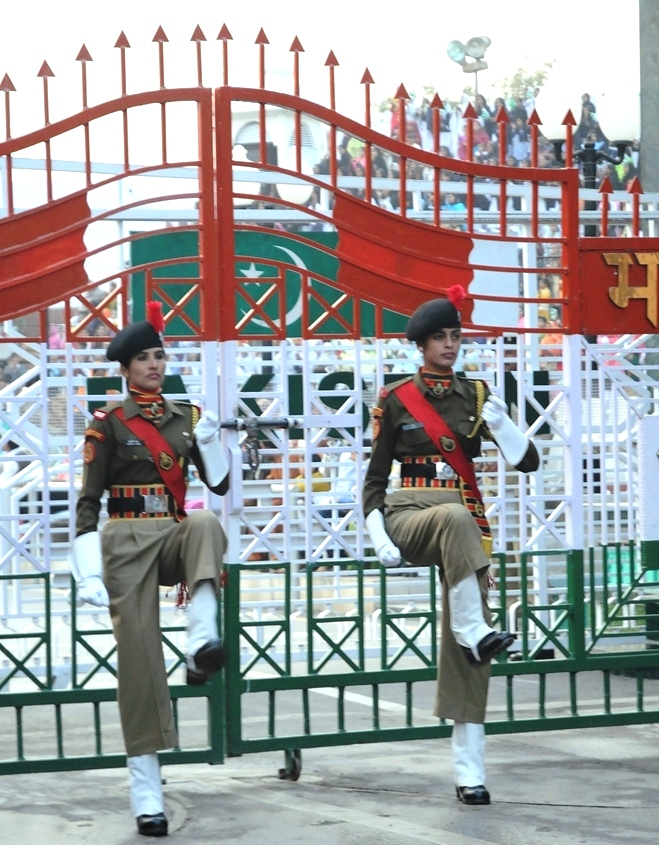
Women personnel of Border Security Force taking part in the ceremonial retreat at the India–Pakistan border at the Attari border crossing, 2010.

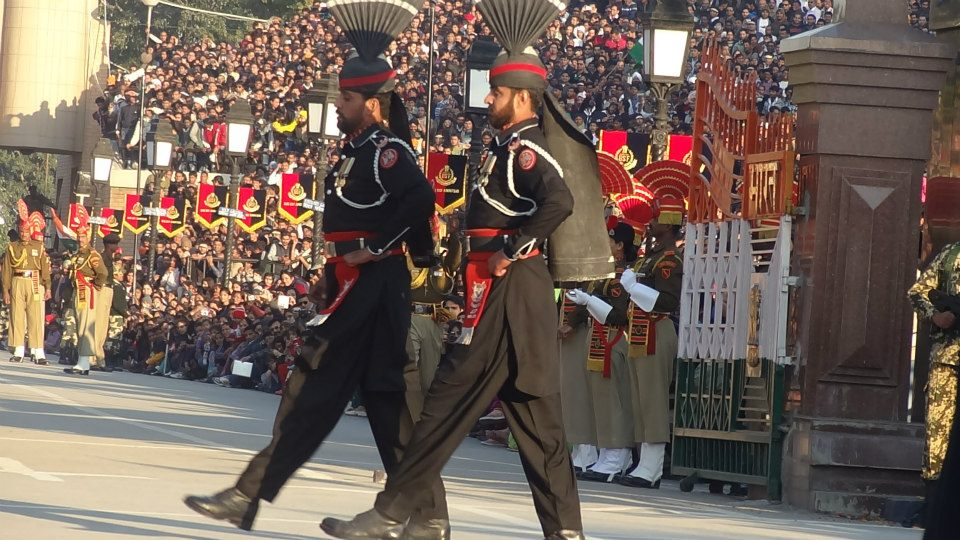
Pakistani Rangers at the Wagah border crossing

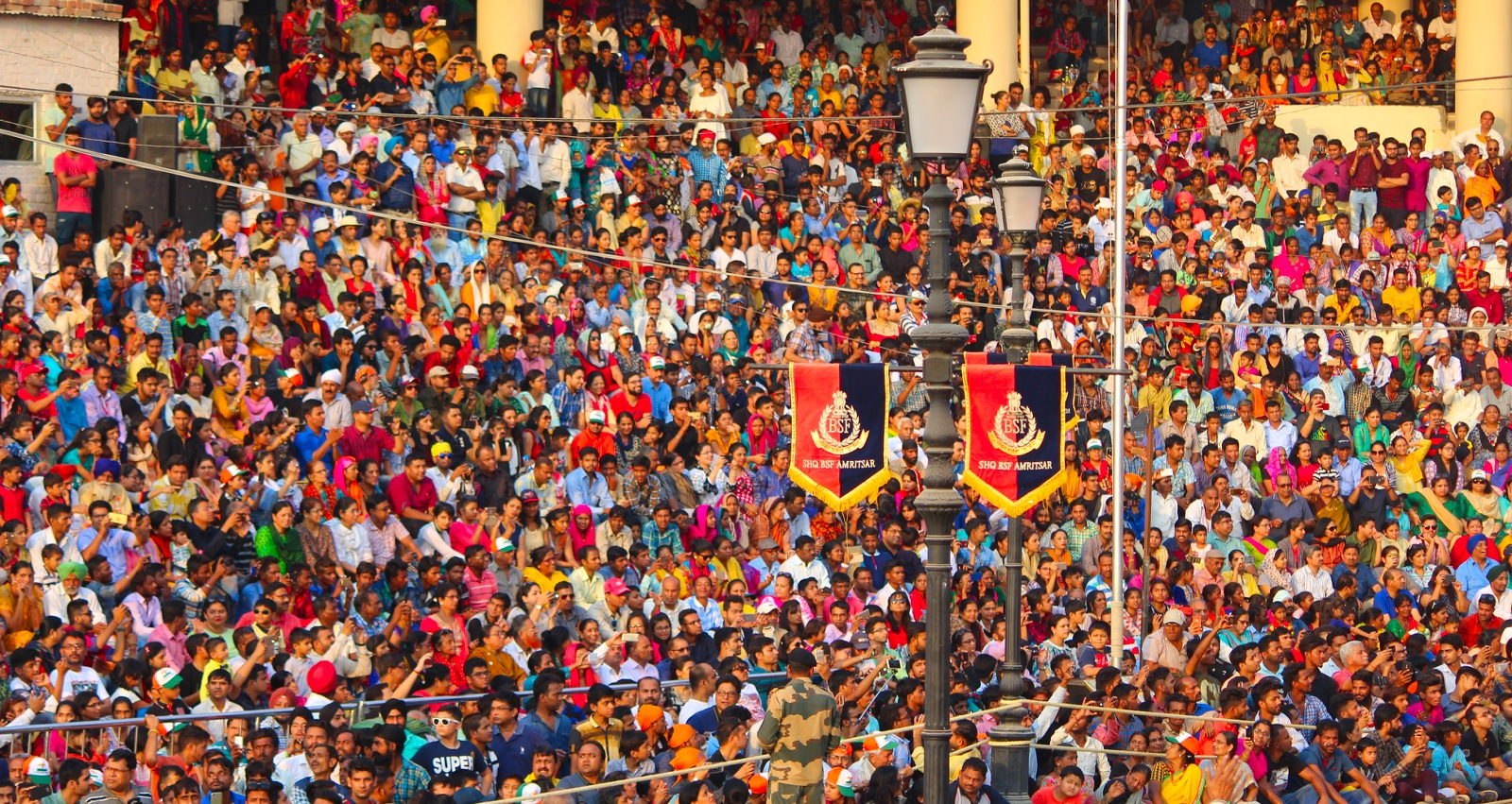
Indian crowd watching the ceremony at Attari border

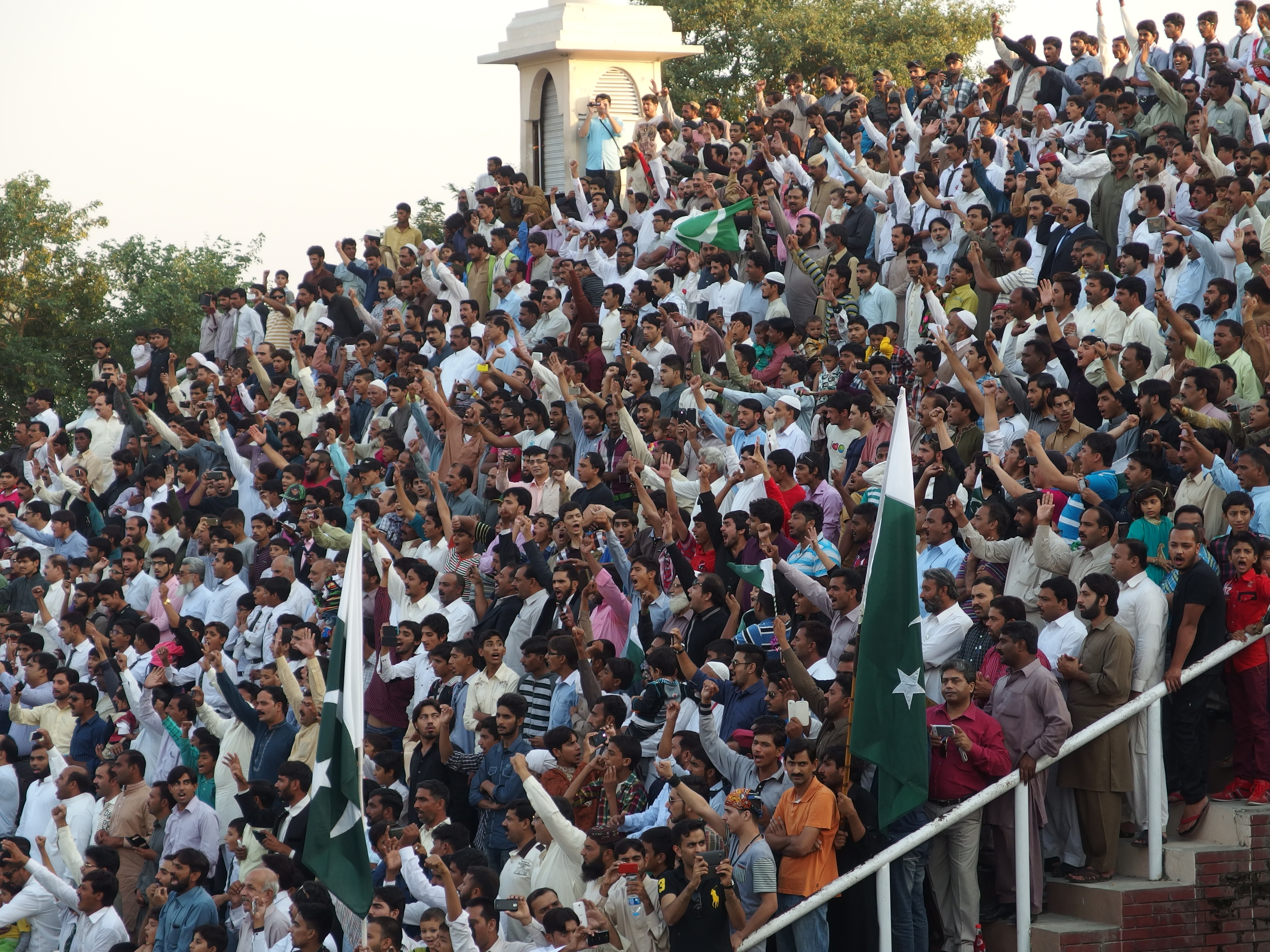
Pakistani crowd watching the ceremony at Wagah border

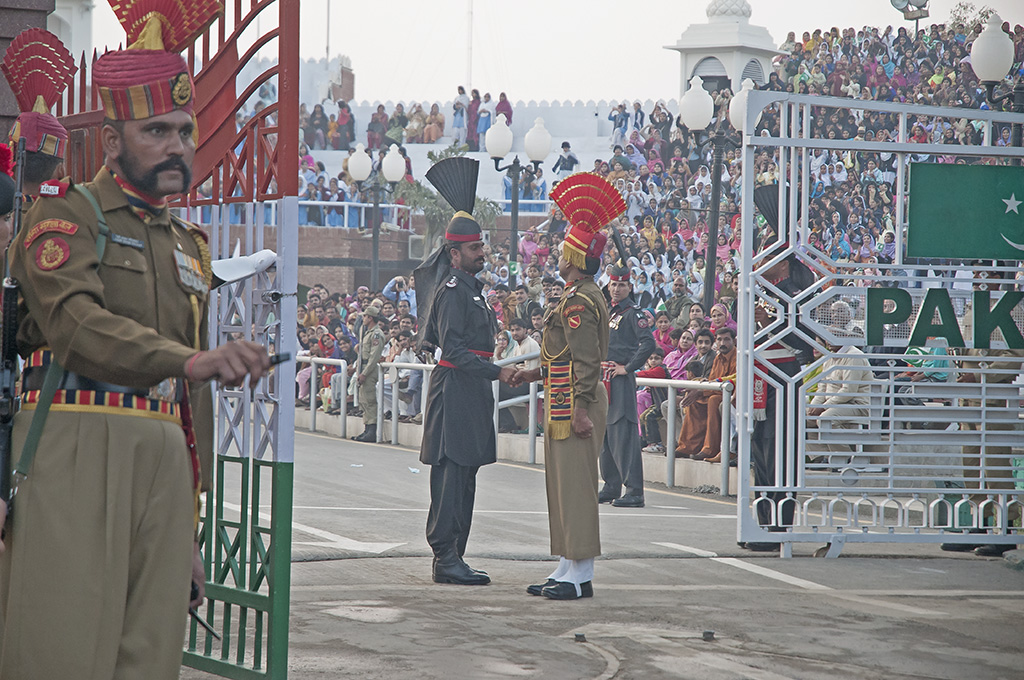
Pakistani and Indian soldiers shaking hands

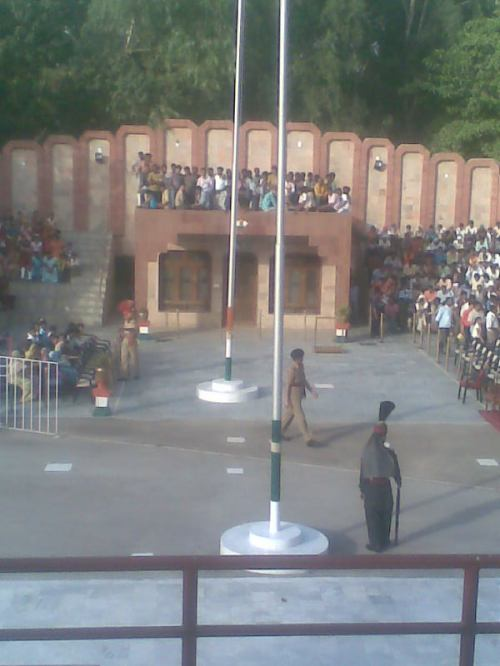
Border ceremony at Ganda Singh Wala–Hussainiwala border

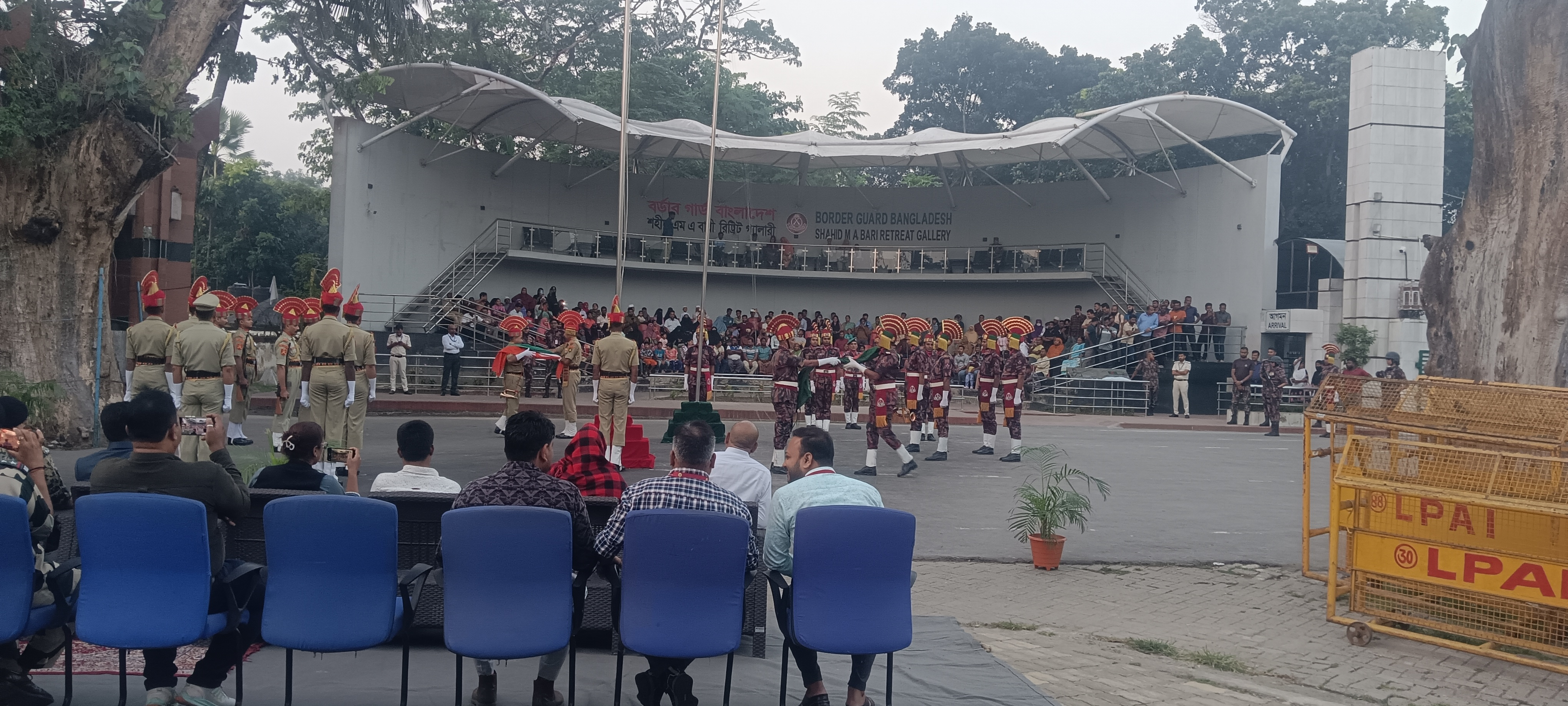
Benapole–Petrapole border ceremony

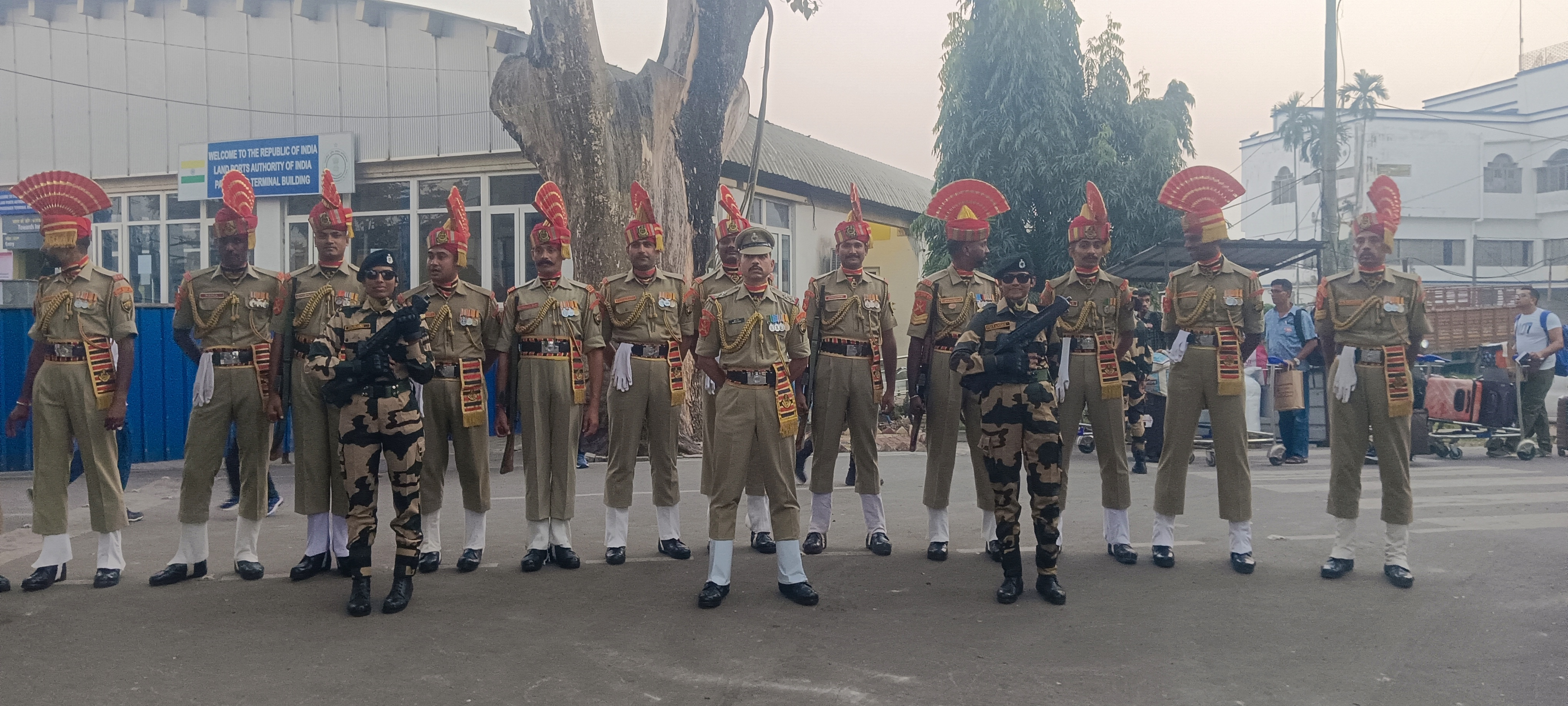
BSF at Petrapole Border in Ceremonial Dress

Wagah–Attari border ceremony from Pakistani side, 2013

== See also ==
- Benapole–Petrapole border ceremony
