= PP-173 Lahore-XXIX =

Constituency of the Provincial Assembly of Punjab, Pakistan

- Constituency for the Provincial Assembly of Punjab
- Region: Lahore City in Lahore District

Current constituency
- Created: 2002
- Created from: PP-142 Lahore-VI (2002-2018); PP-172 Lahore-XXIX (2018-2023)

PP-173 Lahore-XXIX (پی پی-173، لاہور-29) is a Constituency of Provincial Assembly of Punjab.

== General elections 2024 ==
Provincial election 2024: PP-173 Lahore-XXIX
Party	Candidate	Votes	%	±%
PML(N)	Marghoob Ahmad	63,238	45.45	
Independent	M. Zubair Khan Niazi (Note: Filed nomination papers as PTI candidate but ECP allowed him to run as an Independent)	49,522	35.59	
TLP	Shahzad Yousaf	10,635	7.64	
Independent	Yasmin Rashid	4,000	2.88	
JI	M. Munir	2,812	2.02	
Independent	Anees Ahmad Khan Lodhi	2,558	1.84	
Others	Others (twenty candidates)	6,369	4.58	
Turnout		142,033	40.69	
Total valid votes		139,134	97.96	
Rejected ballots		3,899	2.04	
Majority		13,716	9.86	
Registered electors		349,072		
hold				

== General elections 2018 ==
Provincial election 2018: PP-172 Lahore-XXIX
Party	Candidate	Votes	%	±%
PML(N)	Muhammad Mirza Javed	24,382	30.38	
Independent	Abdul Rasheed Bhatti	18,710	23.31	
PTI	Khalid Mehmood	17,857	22.25	
Independent	Muhammad Safdar Ali	7,759	9.67	
TLP	Muhammad Arshad	6,231	7.76	
PPP	Muhammad Akhtar Rasool	2,917	3.63	
Others	Others (twenty seven candidates)	2,411	3.00	
Turnout		83,204	57.92	
Total valid votes		80,267	96.47	
Rejected ballots		2,937	3.53	
Majority		5,672	7.07	
Registered electors		143,652		

== General elections 2013 ==
Provincial election 2013: PP-142 Lahore-VI
Party	Candidate	Votes	%	±%
PML(N)	Muhammad Hamza Shehbaz Sharif	44,130	64.99	
PTI	Waqar Ahmad	20,305	29.90	
PPP	Arif Naseem Kashmiri	2,886	4.25	
Others	Others (eleven candidates)	584	0.86	
Turnout		69,012	50.83	
Total valid votes		67,905	98.40	
Rejected ballots		1,107	1.60	
Majority		23,825	35.09	
Registered electors		135,778		

== General elections 2008 ==
Contesting candidates	Party affiliation	Votes polled

== See also ==
- PP-172 Lahore-XXVIII
- PP-174 Lahore-XXX
