= PP-174 Lahore-XXX =

Constituency of the Punjabi Provincial Legislature, Pakistan

- Constituency for the Provincial Assembly of Punjab
- Region: Lahore City in Lahore District

Current constituency
- Created: 2002
- Created from: PP-139 Lahore-III (2002-2018); PP-173 Lahore-XXX (2018-2023)

PP-174 Lahore-XXX (پی پی-174، لاہور-30) is a Constituency of Provincial Assembly of Punjab.

== General elections 2024 ==
Provincial election 2024: PP-174 Lahore-XXX
Party	Candidate	Votes	%	±%
PML(N)	Bilal Yasin	36,265	41.30	
Independent	Ch. Muhammad Asghar (Note: Filed nomination papers as PTI candidate but ECP allowed him to run as an Independent)	33,957	38.67	
TLP	Muhammad Amir	10,621	12.10	
Others	Others (twenty one candidates)	6,966	7.93	
Turnout		89,326	38.24	
Total valid votes		87,809	98.30	
Rejected ballots		1,517	1.70	
Majority		2,308	2.63	
Registered electors		233,585		
hold				

== General elections 2018 ==
Provincial election 2018: PP-173 Lahore-XXX
Party	Candidate	Votes	%	±%
PTI	Sarfraz Hussain	29,731	45.10	
PML(N)	Irfan Shafi Khokhar	27,640	41.93	
TLP	Fayyaz Hussain Shah	4,736	7.18	
MMA	Zikrullah Mujahid	1,623	2.46	
PPP	Rubina Sohail Butt	1,229	1.86	
Others	Others (seven candidates)	967	1.47	
Turnout		67,037	55.51	
Total valid votes		65,926	98.34	
Rejected ballots		1,111	1.66	
Majority		2,091	3.17	
Registered electors		120,765		

== General elections 2013 ==
Provincial election 2013: PP-139 Lahore-III
Party	Candidate	Votes	%	±%
PML(N)	Bilal Yasin	44,670	54.78	
PTI	Mazher Iqbal Bhalli Butt	25,802	31.64	
Independent	Ayaz Ahmad Bobi	3,485	4.27	
JUI (F)	Sheikh Ul Hadees Moulana Naeem Ul Din	3,159	3.87	
PPP	Majid Hussain	2,251	2.76	
Others	Others (eighteen candidates)	2,178	2.67	
Turnout		82,596	51.26	
Total valid votes		81,545	98.73	
Rejected ballots		1,051	1.27	
Majority		18,868	23.14	
Registered electors		161,129		

== See also ==
- PP-173 Lahore-XXIX
- PP-175 Kasur-I
