= PP-177 Kasur-III =

Constituency of the Provincial Assembly of Punjab, Pakistan

- Constituency for the Provincial Assembly of Punjab
- Region: Kasur city area of Kasur District

Current constituency
- Created from: PP-177 Kasur-III (2002-2018); PP-174 Kasur-I (2018-2023)

PP-177 Kasur-III (پی پی-177، قصور-3) is a Constituency of Provincial Assembly of Punjab.

== General elections 2024 ==
Provincial election 2024: PP-177 Kasur-III
Party	Candidate	Votes	%	±%
PML(N)	Muhammad Naeem Safdar	45,634	33.83	
Independent	Muhammad Saleem Mahar (Note: Filed nomination papers as PTI candidate but ECP allowed him to run as an Independent)	32,033	23.75	
Independent	Muhammad Ilyas	29,328	21.74	
TLP	Sher Muhammad	11,440	8.48	
PPP	Asif Ali	10,974	8.14	
JI	Muhammad Aneeb Afzal	2,149	1.59	
Others	Others (nineteen candidates)	3,327	2.47	
Turnout		139,125	48.92	
Total valid votes		134,885	96.95	
Rejected ballots		4,240	3.05	
Majority		13,601	10.08	
Registered electors		284,416		
hold				

== General elections 2018 ==
Provincial election 2018: PP-174 Kasur-I
Party	Candidate	Votes	%	±%
PML(N)	Muhammad Naeem Safdar	55,485	50.90	
PTI	Muhammad Maqsood Sabir Ansari	24,852	22.80	
PPP	Shabir Ahmad	7,316	6.71	
TLP	Manzoor Ahmed Ansari	5,873	5.39	
Independent	Hafiz Muhammad Shahid	4,878	4.48	
Independent	Muhammad Jawad	4,780	4.39	
MMA	Syed Muhammad Zaheer Shah Hamdani	2,313	2.12	
Others	Others (eleven candidates)	3,510	3.21	
Turnout		111,595	56.64	
Total valid votes		109,007	97.68	
Rejected ballots		2,588	2.32	
Majority		30,633	28.10	
Registered electors		197,017		

== General elections 2013 ==
Provincial election 2013: PP-177 Kasur-III
Party	Candidate	Votes	%	±%
PML(N)	Muhammad Naeem Safdar Ansari	61,520	66.11	
PTI	Syed Muzaffar Hassan	11,468	12.32	
PPP	Muhammad Ashfaq	10,429	11.21	
JUI (F)	Syed Muhammad Zohair Shah Hamdani	2,806	3.02	
Christian Progressive Movement	Akhtar Masih	1,626	1.75	
Independent	Atta-Ur-Rehman	1,163	1.25	
Others	Others	4,044	4.35	
Turnout		94,996	61.27	
Total valid votes		93,056	97.96	
Rejected ballots		1,940	2.04	
Majority		50,052	53.79	
Registered electors		155,042		

== General elections 2008 ==
Contesting candidates	Party affiliation	Votes polled

== See also ==
- PP-176 Kasur-II
- PP-178 Kasur-IV
