= Mehran Force =

- Founded: 1942
- Country: Pakistan
- Size: 24,000 active troops
- Headquarters: Karachi, Sindh

The Mehran Force was an auxiliary of the Pakistan Army used for internal security duties in Sindh. In 1994 the Mehran Force had a strength of 24,000 and was organizationally divided into "wings" of approximately 800 men each.

The Mehran Force was subordinate to the Ministry of Interior and was commanded by seconded army generals.

== History ==
During 1948, the unit was re-designated as the Sindh Police Rangers. In 1956, this unit was then renamed as the Indus Rangers. Due to the deteriorating Law and Order situation in upper Sindh, Headquarters Mehran Force was established in Karachi in 1989 to deal with the situation.

In 1995, the Pakistan Rangers was divided into the Pakistan Rangers (Punjab) and the Pakistan Rangers (Sindh) and the Mehran Force was then merged into the Pakistan Rangers (Sindh). The Pakistan Rangers (Sindh) is governed by Ranger's Ordinance 1959 and operates under the control of the Ministry of Interior and Headquarters 5 Corps.

== See also ==
- Pakistan Rangers (Sindh)
