= PP-175 Kasur-I =

Constituency of the Provincial Assembly of Punjab, Pakistan

- Constituency for the Provincial Assembly of Punjab
- Region: Kot Radha Kishan Tehsil of Kasur District

Current constituency
- Created from: PP-176 Kasur-II (2002-2018); PP-182 Kasur-IX (2018-2023)

PP-175 Kasur-I (پی پی-175، قصور-1) is a Constituency of Provincial Assembly of Punjab.

== General elections 2024 ==
Provincial election 2024: PP-175 Kasur-I
Party	Candidate	Votes	%	±%
Independent	Rashid Tufail (Note: Filed nomination papers as PTI candidate but ECP allowed him to run as an Independent)	44,933	36.27	
PML(N)	Rasheed Ahmad Khan	38,245	30.87	
TLP	Chaudhry Muhammad Ali	22,999	18.56	
Independent	Dawood Anis Qureshi	9,259	7.47	
JUI (F)	Muhamad Zakaria	4,210	3.40	
Others	Others (nineteen candidates)	4,255	3.43	
Turnout		126,289	57.35	
Total valid votes		123,901	98.11	
Rejected ballots		2,388	1.89	
Majority		6,688	5.40	
Registered electors		220,219		
hold				

== General elections 2018 ==
Provincial election 2018: PP-182 Kasur-IX
Party	Candidate	Votes	%	±%
PML(N)	Muhammad Ilyas Khan	43,038	35.14	
PTI	Muhammad Dawar Hayat	18,611	15.20	
TLP	Chaudhry Muhammad Ali	14,306	11.68	
Independent	Waqar Mustafa	12,809	10.46	
Independent	Asad Ullah Khan	9,484	7.74	
Independent	Muhammad Anis Qurashi	8,827	7.21	
PPP	Muhammad Sharif	7,124	5.82	
AAT	Muhammad Zaman Sindhu	4,284	3.50	
Independent	Afzal Khan	1,528	1.25	
Others	Others (fourteen candidates)	2,462	2.00	
Turnout		126,300	61.43	
Total valid votes		122,473	96.97	
Rejected ballots		3,827	3.03	
Majority		24,427	19.94	
Registered electors		205,597		

== General elections 2013 ==
Provincial election 2013: PP-176 Kasur-II
Party	Candidate	Votes	%	±%
PML(N)	Mohammad Anis Qureshi	23,899	28.14	
Independent	Asad Ullah Khan	13,640	16.06	
Independent	Amjad Ali Tufail	12,045	14.18	
Independent	Sardar Nabi Ahmad Advocate	9,294	10.94	
PTI	Tanveer Arshad	7,628	8.98	
Jamiat Ulema-e-Pakistan	Mohammad Sharif	5,861	6.90	
PPP	Akhtar Hussain	4,971	5.85	
Independent	Chudhary Muhammad Ali	4,610	5.43	
Others	Others (sixteen candidates)	2,989	3.52	
Turnout		88,432	66.46	
Total valid votes		84,937	96.05	
Rejected ballots		3,495	3.95	
Majority		10,259	12.08	
Registered electors		133,061		

== General elections 2008 ==
Contesting candidates	Party affiliation	Votes polled

== See also ==
- PP-174 Lahore-XXX
- PP-176 Kasur-II
