= PP-172 Lahore-XXVIII =

Constituency of the Provincial Assembly of Punjab, Pakistan

- Constituency for the Provincial Assembly of Punjab
- Region: Lahore City in Lahore District

Current constituency
- Created from: PP-149 Lahore-XIII (2002-2018); PP-171 Lahore-XXVIII (2018-2023)

PP-172 Lahore-XXVIII (پی پی-172، لاہور-28) is a Constituency of Provincial Assembly of Punjab.

== General elections 2024 ==
Provincial election 2024: PP-172 Lahore-XXVIII
Party	Candidate	Votes	%	±%
Independent	Misbah Wajid (Note: Filed nomination papers as PTI candidate but ECP allowed him to run as an Independent)	31,379	39.66	
PML(N)	Rana Mashood Ahmad Khan	28,649	36.21	
TLP	Nouman Fazal	8,392	10.61	
Independent	Bajjash Khan Niazi	3,869	4.89	
PPP	Asif Mehmood Nagra	2,448	3.09	
Others	Others (twenty candidates)	4,384	5.54	
Turnout		81,313	41.31	
Total valid votes		79,121	97.30	
Rejected ballots		2,192	2.70	
Majority		2,730	3.45	
Registered electors		196,850		
hold				

== General elections 2018 ==
Provincial election 2018: PP-171 Lahore-XXVIII
Party	Candidate	Votes	%	±%
PML(N)	Rana Muhamamd Tariq	30,664	42.12	
PTI	Rana Javed Omer	18,345	25.20	
TLP	Muhammad Nawaz	10,352	14.22	
TLI	Muhammad Latif	4,622	6.35	
PPP	Arshad Mahmood Lodhi	3,645	5.01	
Independent	Malik Muhammad Ashraf	2,373	3.26	
MMA	Ghulam Hussain	745	1.02	
Others	Others (twenty two candidates)	2,050	2.82	
Turnout		75,031	54.64	
Total valid votes		72,797	97.02	
Rejected ballots		2,234	2.98	
Majority		12,319	16.92	
Registered electors		137,327		

== General elections 2013 ==
Provincial election 2013: PP-149 Lahore-XIII
Party	Candidate	Votes	%	±%
PML(N)	Rana Mashhood Ahmad Khan	47,933	48.25	
PTI	Mian Muhammad Akram Usman	30,913	31.12	
Independent	Muhammad Shuaib Khan Niazi	10,323	10.39	
PPP	Nadir Khan	3,680	3.70	
JI	Shahid Naveed Malik	2,482	2.50	
PML(Q)	Malik Habib Ullah Bhatti	1,931	1.94	
Others	Others (twenty two candidates)	2,080	2.09	
Turnout		101,420	52.27	
Total valid votes		99,342	97.95	
Rejected ballots		2,078	2.05	
Majority		17,020	17.13	
Registered electors		194,015		

== General elections 2008 ==
Contesting candidates	Party affiliation	Votes polled

== See also ==
- PP-171 Lahore-XXVII
- PP-173 Lahore-XXIX
