= PP-176 Kasur-II =

Constituency of the Provincial Assembly of Punjab, Pakistan

- Constituency for the Provincial Assembly of Punjab
- Region: Kasur Tehsil (partly) including Mustafabad and Raja Jang towns of Kasur District

Current constituency
- Created from: PP-175 Kasur-I (2002-2018); PP-175 Kasur-II (2018-2023)

PP-176 Kasur-II (پی پی-176، قصور-2) is a Constituency of Provincial Assembly of Punjab.

== General elections 2024 ==
Provincial election 2024: PP-176 Kasur-II
Party	Candidate	Votes	%	±%
PML(N)	Chaudhry Muhammad llays Khan	48,333	44.42	
Independent	Muzammil Masood	19,238	17.68	
TLP	Muhammad Alamgir	13,152	12.09	
Independent	Nasira Meo	10,365	9.53	
PPP	Waqar Mustafa	9,389	8.63	
Independent	Azhar Iqbal	2,827	2.60	
JUI (F)	Nargas Sajid	2,322	2.13	
Others	Others (twelve candidates)	3,196	2.92	
Turnout		112,066	53.27	
Total valid votes		108,822	97.11	
Rejected ballots		3,244	2.89	
Majority		29,095	26.74	
Registered electors		210,385		
hold				

== General elections 2018 ==
Provincial election 2018: PP-175 Kasur-II
Party	Candidate	Votes	%	±%
PML(N)	Malik Ahmad Saeed Khan	42,140	34.17	
PTI	Muzammal Masood	28,063	22.76	
Independent	Muhammad Yaqoob Nadeem Sethi	11,925	9.67	
TLP	Amjad Ali	8,710	7.06	
PPP	Maqbool Ahmad	7,015	5.69	
Independent	Sarfaraz Anmad Khan Rai	5,664	4.59	
Independent	Irfan Ali	4,206	3.41	
Independent	Muhammad Imran Shareef	2,306	1.87	
Independent	Abdul Subhan	1,933	1.57	
Roshan Pakistan League	Javed Mehmood	1,718	1.39	
Independent	Muhammad Hussain	1,659	1.35	
AAT	Hafiz Muhammad Faisal Mehmood	1,580	1.28	
Independent	Shaukat Ali	1,243	1.01	
APML	Abdul Ghani	1,181	0.96	
Others	Others (twelve candidates)	3,984	3.21	
Turnout		128,158	61.04	
Total valid votes		123,327	96.23	
Rejected ballots		4,831	3.77	
Majority		14,077	11.41	
Registered electors		209,951		

== General elections 2013 ==
Provincial election 2013: PP-175 Kasur-I
Party	Candidate	Votes	%	±%
PML(N)	Muhammad Yaqub Nadeem Sethai	33,758	34.95	
Independent	Muhammad Ilyas Khan	29,149	30.18	
PTI	Masood Ahmed	27,881	28.87	
JI	Muhammad Iqbal Shad	1,673	1.73	
Independent	Sayed Baqar Raza Naqvi	1,347	1.39	
Others	Others (nine candidates)	2,772	2.87	
Turnout		99,432	66.51	
Total valid votes		96,580	97.13	
Rejected ballots		2,852	2.87	
Majority		4,609	4.77	
Registered electors		149,494		

== General elections 2008 ==
Contesting candidates	Party affiliation	Votes polled

== See also ==
- PP-175 Kasur-I
- PP-177 Kasur-III
