= Pakistan Rangers =

Pakistani paramilitary force

Pakistan Rangers پاکستان رینجرز
- Common name: Rangers
- Abbreviation: PR
- Motto: Ever ready

Agency overview
- Formed: 1942; 84 years ago (as Sindh Rifles)
- Employees: 40,730
- Annual budget: Rs. 25.95 billion (2020)

Jurisdictional structure
- Federal agency (Operations jurisdiction): Pakistan
- Operations jurisdiction: Punjab Rangers in Punjab and Sindh Rangers in Sindh, Pakistan
- Area: 317,164 km² (134,041 sq mi)
- Population: 185,748,932
- Legal jurisdiction: Sindh; Punjab; Islamabad Capital Territory
- Governing body: Ministry of Interior
- Constituting instrument: Pakistan Rangers Ordinance, 1959
- General nature: Federal law enforcement
- Specialist jurisdictions: Paramilitary law enforcement, counter insurgency, riot control; National border patrol, security, integrity

Operational structure
- Headquarters: Lahore, Punjab (Punjab Rangers); Karachi, Sindh (Sindh Rangers); Islamabad, Islamabad Capital Territory (Federal Rangers)
- Agency executives: Major-General Atif Bin Akram, Director-General, Punjab; Major General Shamraiz Khan, Director-General, Sindh
- Parent agency: Civil Armed Forces

Website
- pakistanrangerssindh.org pakistanrangers.punjab.gov.pk

The Pakistan Rangers (Urdu: پاکستان رینجرز) are a pair of paramilitary federal law enforcement corps' in Pakistan. The two corps are the Punjab Rangers (operating in Punjab province with headquarters in Lahore) and the Sindh Rangers (operating in Sindh province with headquarters in Karachi). There is a third corps headquarters in Islamabad but it is only for units transferred from the other corps for duties in the federal capital. They are both part of the Civil Armed Forces.

The corps' operate administratively under the Pakistan Army but under separate command structures and wear distinctly different uniforms. However, they are usually commanded by officers on secondment from the Pakistan Army. Their primary purpose is to secure and defend the approximately 2,200 km (1,400 mi) long mutually recognised India–Pakistan border. This border does not include the heavily militarized Line of Control (LoC) in the Kashmir conflict, where the Pakistani province of Punjab adjoins Indian-administered Jammu and Kashmir. Consequently, the LoC is not managed by the paramilitary Punjab Rangers, but by the Pakistan Army. They are also often involved in major internal and external security operations with the regular Pakistani military and provide assistance to provincial police forces to maintain law and order against crime, terrorism and unrest. In addition, the Punjab Rangers, together with the Indian Border Security Force, participate in an elaborate flag lowering ceremony at the Wagah−Attari border crossing east of Lahore.

As part of the paramilitary Civil Armed Forces, the Rangers can be transferred to full operational control of the Pakistan Army in wartime and whenever Article 245 of the Constitution of Pakistan is invoked to provide "military aid to civil power". An example of this is the Sindh Rangers deployment in Karachi to tackle rising crime and terrorism. Although these deployments are officially temporary because the provincial and federal governments have to allocate policing powers to the corps, they have in effect become permanent because of repeated renewal of those powers.

In July 2025, a tragic incident in Karachi's SITE-A Area drew attention to the deteriorating morale and working conditions within the Pakistan Rangers. A clash between a Rangers personnel and a police officer escalated into a deadly shootout, resulting in the death of Police Constable Waseem Akhtar and serious injuries to a Rangers official, Nauman, who was deployed with the 34 Wing. Nauman, reportedly under extreme stress, remains unconscious in hospital care.

Observers and law enforcement sources noted that the altercation reflected deeper systemic issues, including poor mental health support, low wages, and inadequate living conditions faced by paramilitary personnel. The incident reignited public debate over the lack of institutional reforms and the psychological toll on frontline forces operating in high-pressure urban deployment.

== History ==
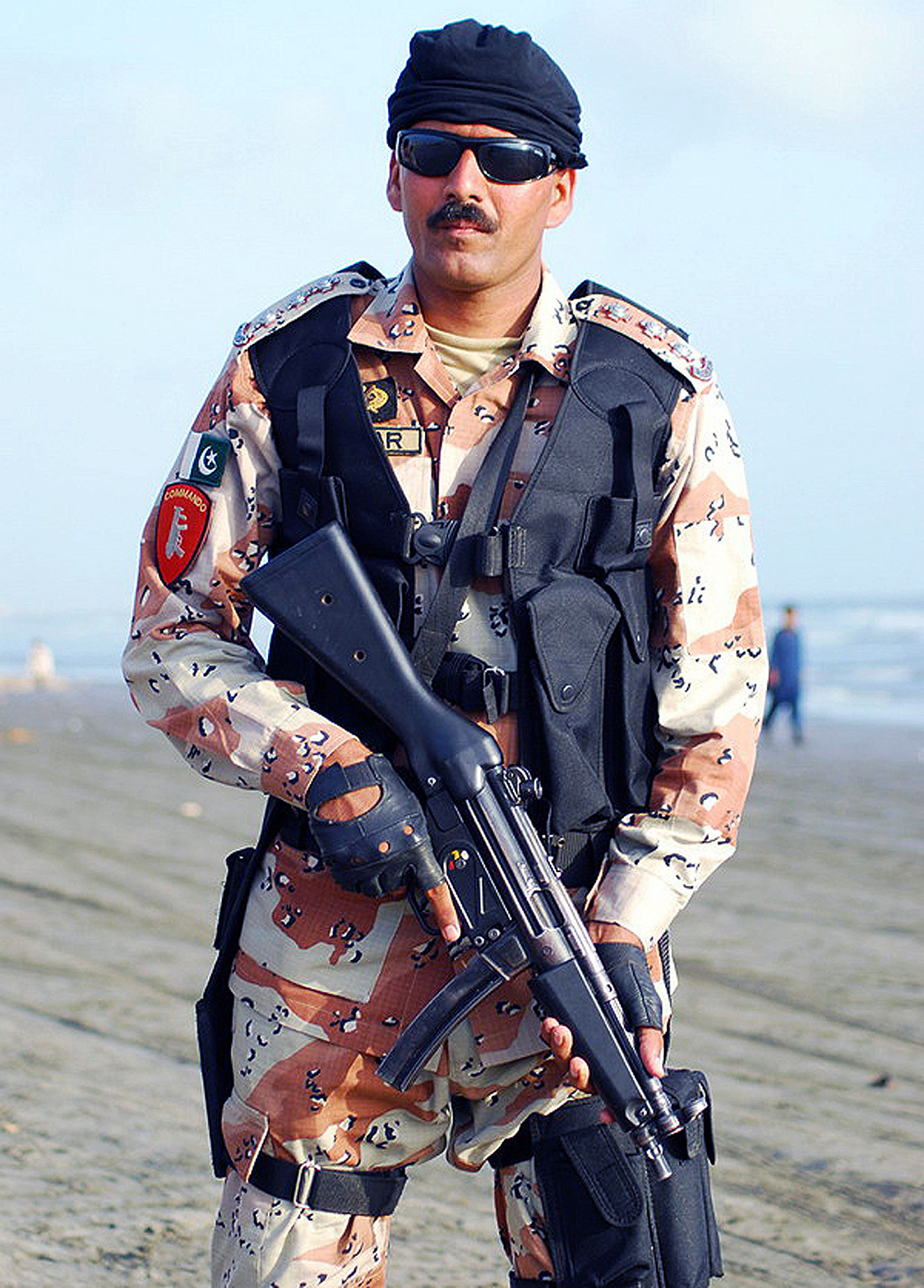
A uniformed Sindh Ranger in Desert Battle Dress Uniform armed with a Heckler & Koch/POF MP5.

The origins of the Rangers go back to 7 October 1958 where small paramilitaries were restructured and renamed to the West Pakistan Rangers. In 1972, following the independence of East Pakistan and Legal Framework Order No. 1970 by the Government of Pakistan, the force was officially renamed from the West Pakistan Rangers to the Pakistan Rangers and put under control of the Ministry of Defence with its headquarters at Lahore.

In 1974, the organization became part of the Civil Armed Forces under the Pakistani Ministry of Interior, where it has remained since.

In late 1989, due to growing riots and the worsening situation of law and order in the province of Sindh, a new force was raised for a strategic anti-dacoit operation. The paramilitary force operated under the name of the Mehran Force and consisted of the then-existing Sindh Rangers, three battalions of the Pakistan Army (including the Northern Scouts). The Mehran Force was under the direct command of the Director-General (DG) of the Pakistan Rangers with its nucleus headquarters at the Jinnah Courts in Karachi.

Following these series of events, the federal government decided substantially to increase the strength of the Pakistan Rangers and raise a separate, dedicated headquarters for them in the province of Sindh. On 1 July 1995 the Pakistan Rangers were bifurcated into two distinct forces, the Pakistan Rangers – Punjab (Punjab Rangers) and Pakistan Rangers – Sindh (Sindh Rangers). Consequently, the Mehran Force and other Pakistani paramilitary units operating in the province of Sindh were merged with and began to operate under the Sindh Rangers.

=== Wartime responsibilities ===
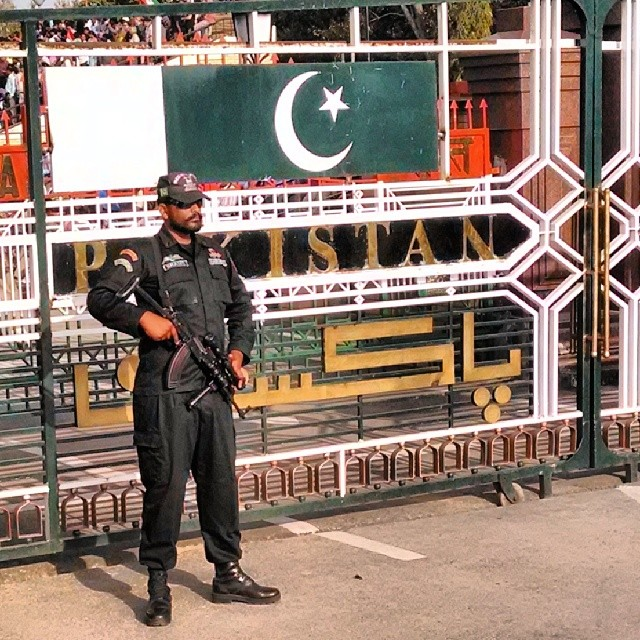
A Punjab Ranger at the Wagah border.

The West Pakistan Rangers fought alongside the Pakistan Army in several conflicts, namely the Indo-Pakistani War of 1965 and the Indo-Pakistani War of 1971. After the war in 1971 and subsequent independence of Bangladesh, the force was federalized under the Ministry of Defence as the Pakistan Rangers and shortly afterwards in 1974, it was made a component of the Civil Armed Forces (CAF) under the Ministry of Interior. Since then, the Pakistan Rangers are primarily responsible for guarding the border with neighbouring India during times of peace and war.

The Pakistan Rangers have participated in military exercises with the Pakistan Army's Special Service Group (SSG) and also assisted with military operations in the past since their revitalization and rebuilding after the Indo-Pakistani War of 1971. The first such participation was in 1973, when they operated under the command of the SSG to raid the Iraqi embassy in Islamabad alongside local police. In 1992, the Sindh Rangers saw an extensive deployment throughout Karachi to keep peace in the city in support of the Government of Sindh. The Sindh Provincial Police and Pakistan Rangers were involved in Operation Blue Fox against the MQM with direction from the Pakistan Army. Due to their close association with the military, the Rangers also saw combat against regular Indian troops during the Kargil War of 1999 in Kashmir. In 2007, the Pakistan Rangers alongside regular Pakistani soldiers and SSG commandos participated in Operation Silence against a Jihadist private militia in Islamabad. The conflict started when, after 18 months of tensions between government authorities and Islamist militia, then the militia attacked the Punjab Rangers guarding the nearby Ministry of Environment building and set it ablaze and subsequently locked themselves inside the Red Mosque. Two years later, in 2009, the Rangers once again participated in a special military operation in Lahore alongside the SSG, when twelve terrorists operating for the Taliban attacked the Manawan Police Academy in Lahore. The operation ended with eight militants killed and four captured. Later that year, the Government of Pakistan deployed the Punjab Rangers to secure the outskirts of Islamabad when the Taliban had taken over the Buner, Lower Dir, Swat and Shangla districts. Following these incidents, the Rangers participated in the Pakistan Army's Operation Black Thunderstorm.

== Role ==
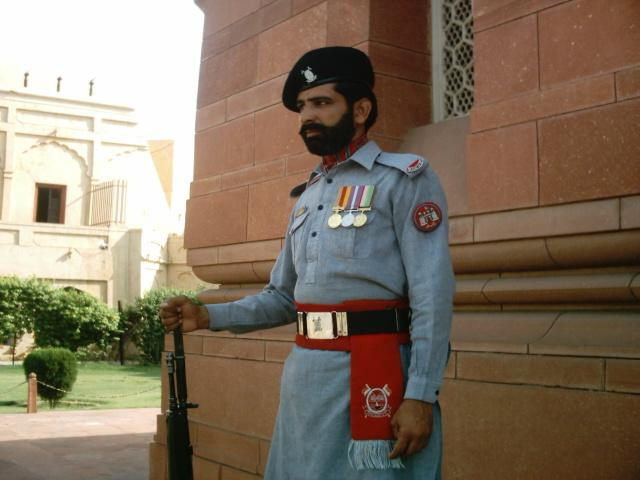
A Ranger in ceremonial dress guarding the Tomb of Muhammad Iqbal in Iqbal Park, Lahore.

Aside from the primary objective of guarding the border with India, the Rangers are also responsible for maintaining internal security in Pakistan and serve as a major law enforcement organization in the country. Despite this, they do not possess the power to make arrests like the regular police with the exception of when the state temporarily sanctions them with such an authority in times of extreme crisis. Their primary objective as an internal security force is to prevent and suppress crime by taking preventive security measures, cracking down on criminals and thwarting organized crime with the use of major force. All suspects apprehended by the Rangers during a crackdown are later handed over to police for further investigation and possible prosecution when the chaos is brought under control. The same privileges are also temporarily granted by the government to other security organizations such as the Frontier Corps for the same reasons.

The Rangers are also tasked with securing important monuments and guarding national assets in all major cities, including Islamabad.

In the past, they have also served as prison guards for high-profile terrorists until they were withdrawn from such duties.

The Rangers have notably contributed towards maintaining law and order in Islamabad, Karachi and Lahore in major crises. Due to the developing internal instability in Pakistan, the Rangers have become an extremely necessary force to maintain order throughout the provinces of Sindh and Punjab.

== Ranks ==
Rank group	General / flag officers	Senior officers		Junior officers
Pakistan Rangers
Pakistan Rangers	Director general ڈائریکٹر جنرل	Senior superintendent of the Rangers سینئر سپرنٹنڈنٹ۔	Superintendent of the Rangers سپرنٹنڈنٹ	Deputy superintendent of the Rangers ڈپٹی سپرنٹنڈنٹ۔	Inspector انسپکٹر	Direct Entry Sub inspector ڈائریکٹ انٹری سب انسپکٹر۔

Rank group	Junior commissioned officers			Non commissioned officer	Enlisted
Pakistan Rangers							No insignia
Pakistan Rangers	Senior inspector سینئر انسپکٹر۔	Inspector انسپکٹر	Sub inspector سب انسپکٹر۔	Havildar حوالدار۔	Naik نائیک۔	Lance Naik لانس نائیک۔	Sepoy سپاہی۔

== Gallery ==
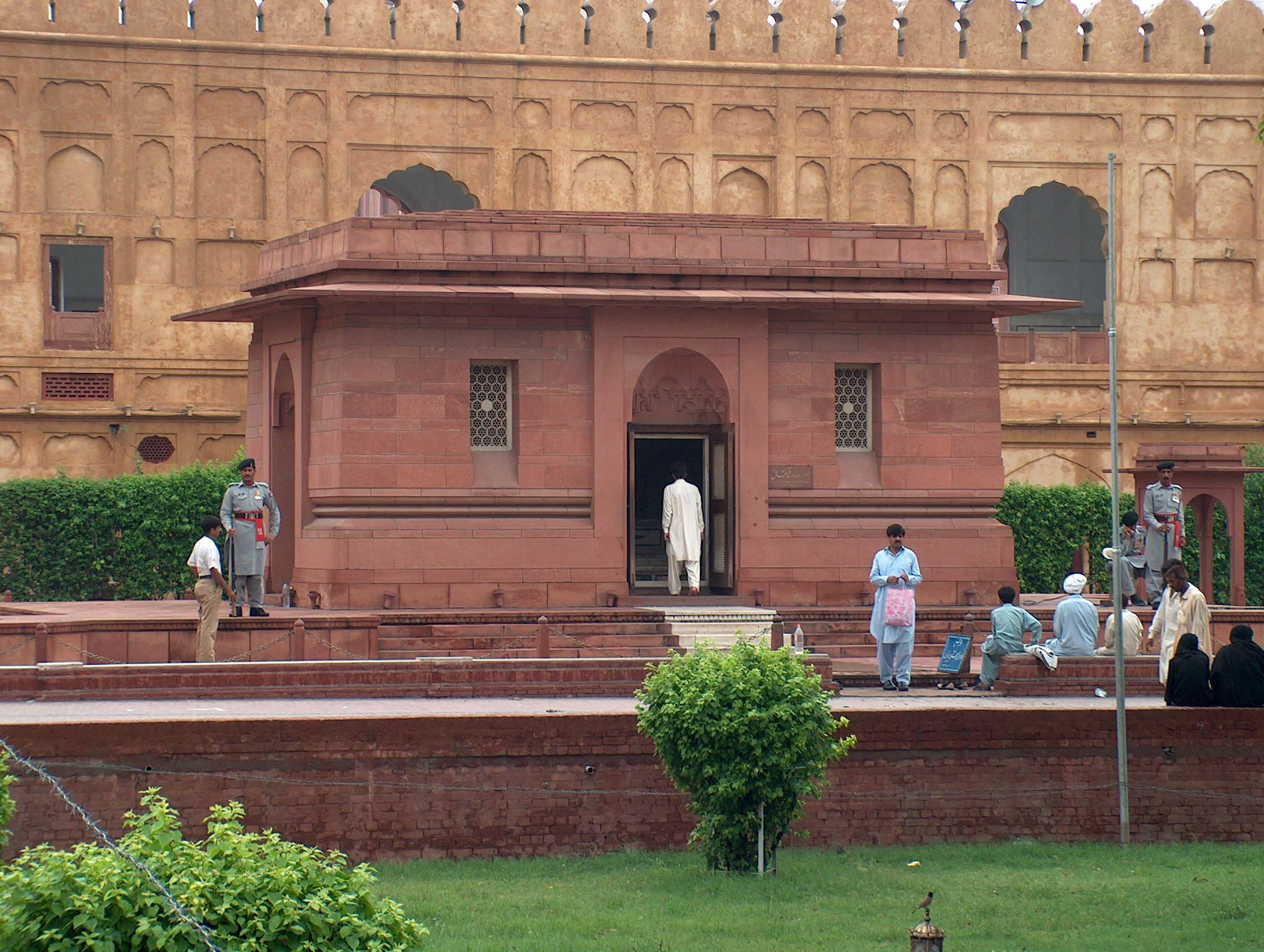
Pakistani Rangers guarding the Tomb of Muhammad Iqbal in Iqbal Park, Lahore

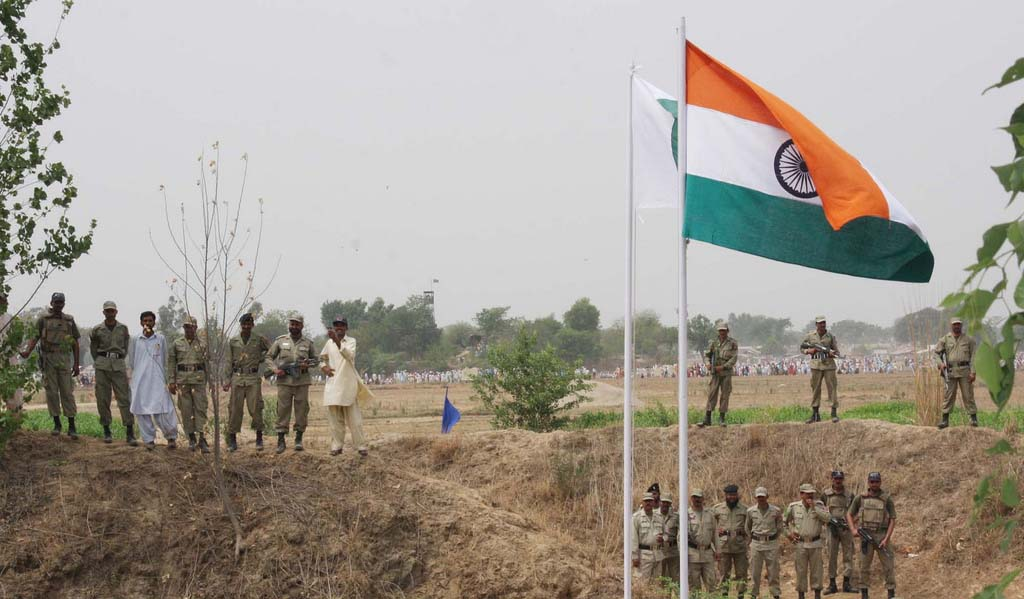
Baba Chamliyal Mela at the Indo-Pakistani International Border, near Jammu.

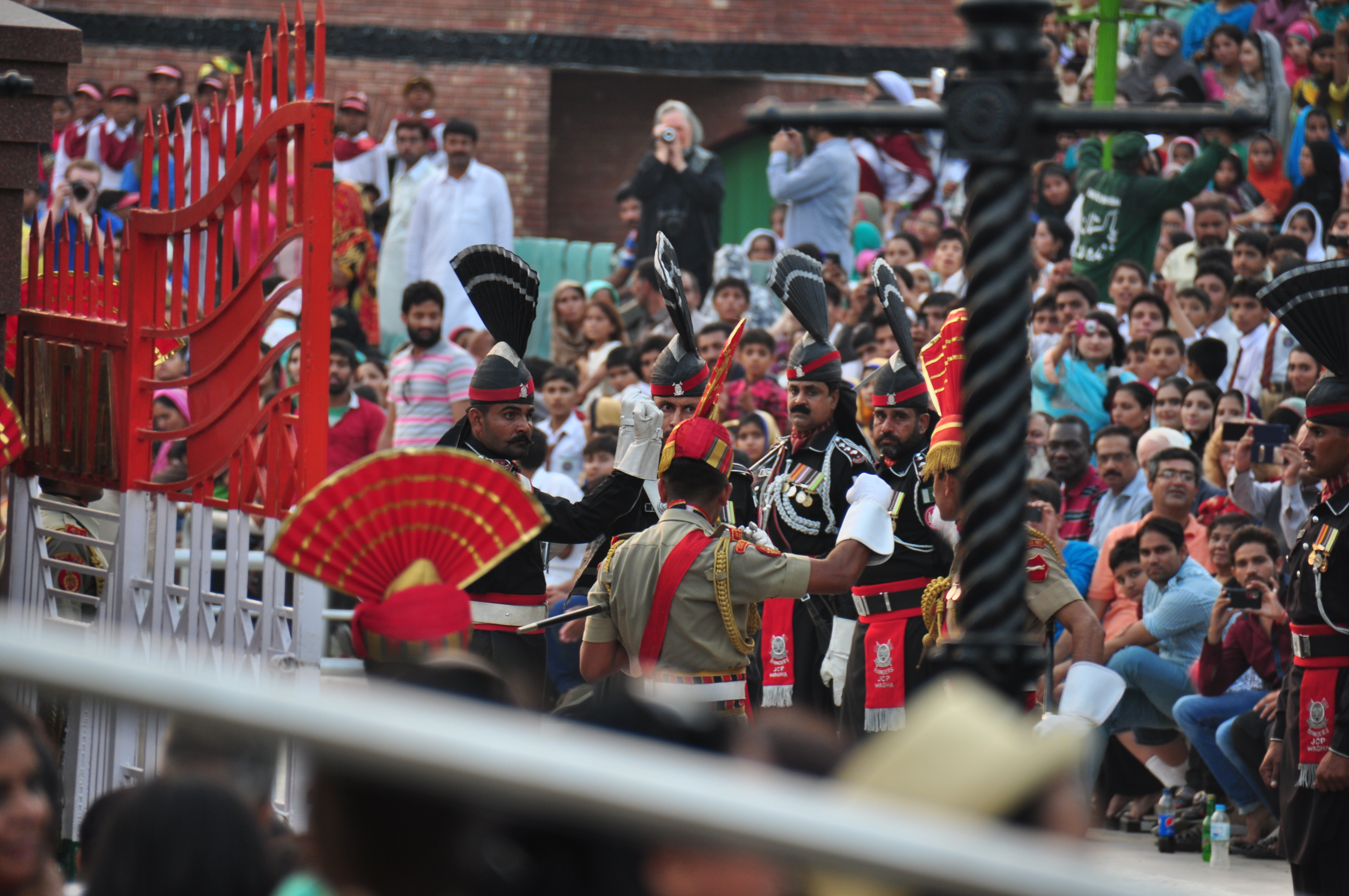
Indian BSF personnel and Pakistani Rangers during the Wagah-Attari border ceremony.

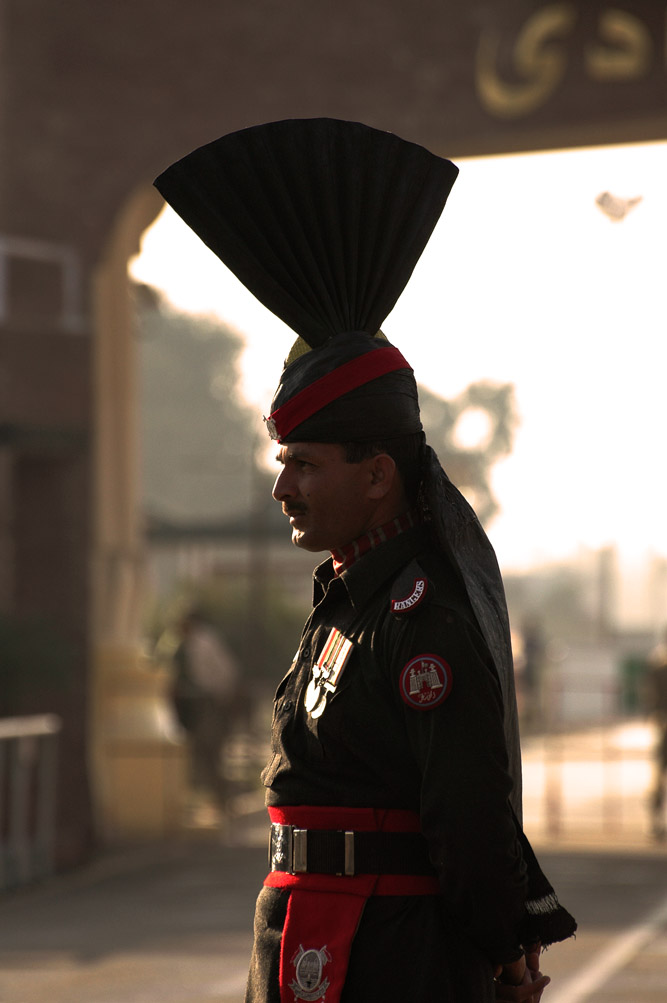
A Pakistani Ranger in ceremonial dress.

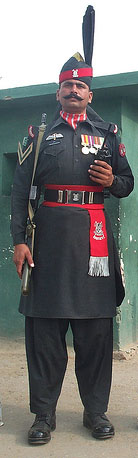
A Pakistani Ranger standing by in ceremonial dress.

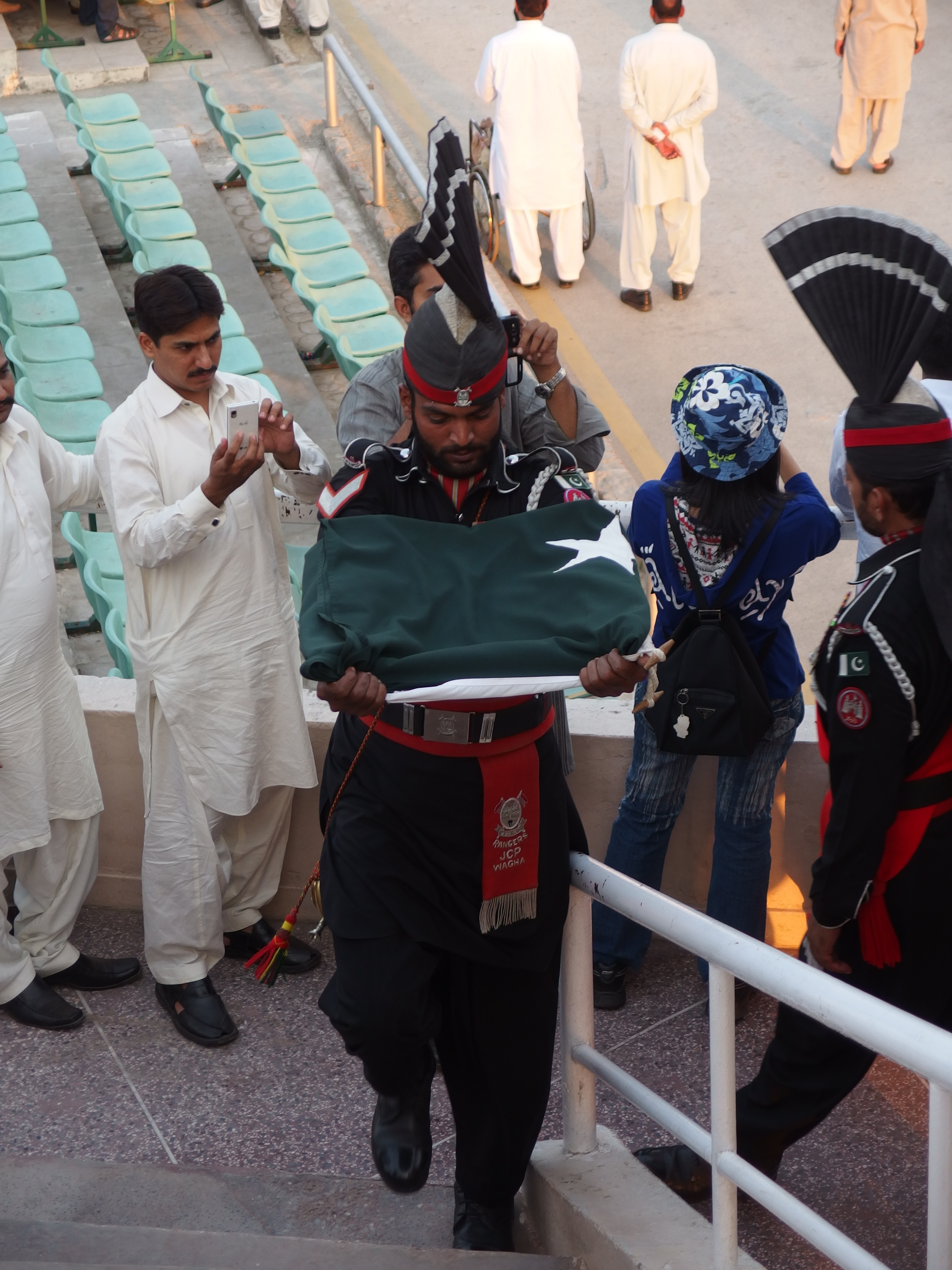
A Pakistani Ranger during the Wagah-Attari border ceremony.

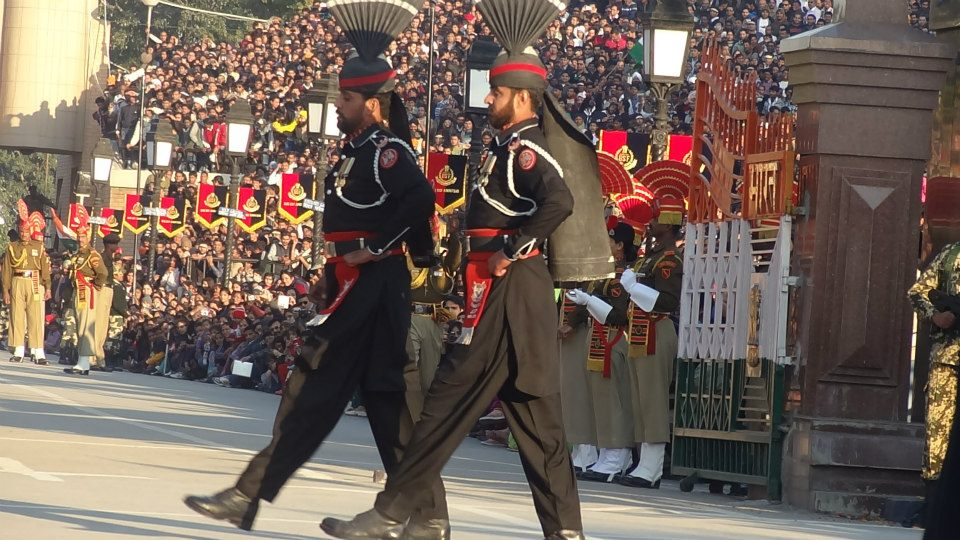
Pakistani Rangers at the Wagah-Attari border crossing.

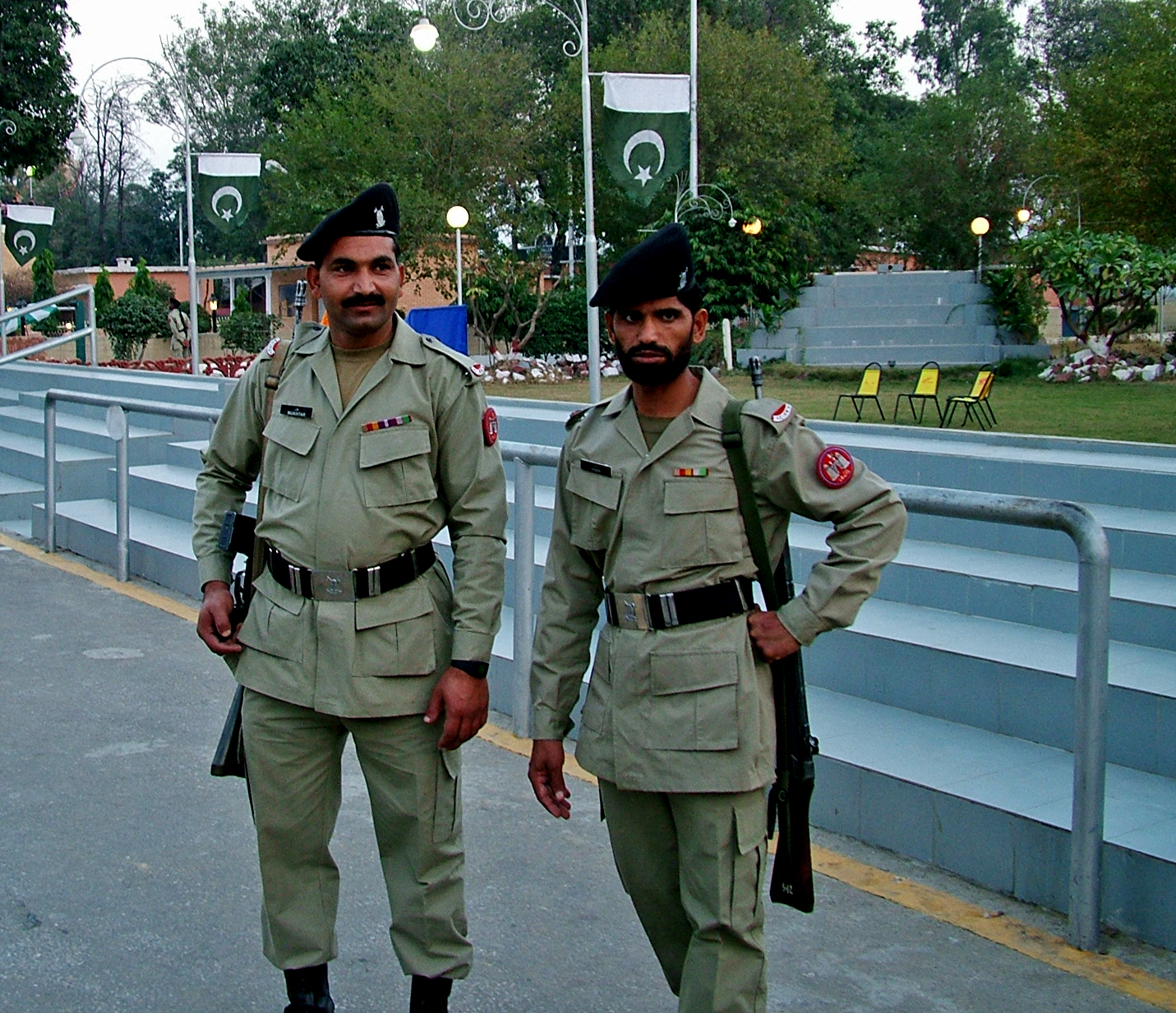
Punjab Rangers near the Indo-Pakistani border with G3 battle rifles.

== See also ==
- United Nations peacekeeping missions involving Pakistan
- Civil Armed Forces
- National Guard (Pakistan)
- Pakistan Levies
