= Ganda Singh Wala =

Ganda Singh Wala گنڈا سِنگھ والا
- village
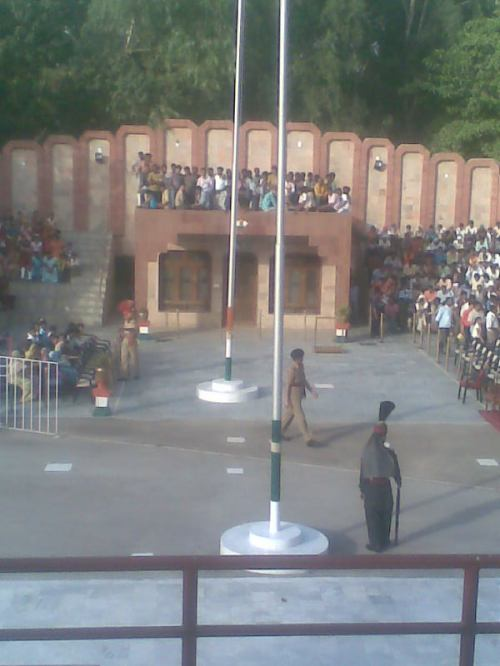
- Flag lowering ceremony at Ganda Singh Wala, near Lahore City

- Location in Punjab, Pakistan Ganda Singh Wala (Pakistan)
- Coordinates: 31°2′16.71″N 74°31′6.47″E
- Country: Pakistan
- Province: Punjab
- District: Kasur

Languages
  - Official: Urdu, Shahmukhi
- Time zone: UTC+5:00 (PST)
- Nearest village: Hussainiwala

Ganda Singh Wala (Punjabi/Urdu: گنڈا سنگھ والا) is a village, just 58 km from Lahore City in Kasur District in the Punjab, Pakistan. Until 1986, it served as the main border crossing between Pakistan and India. The Sutlej River flows by Ganda Singh Wala, and the area is prone to flooding.

The village is now a 45-minute drive from Lahore after the construction of the new Lahore-Firozpur road. The Burj Naamdaar village nearby is noted for the cultivation of bamboo.

== Etymology ==
The village was named after Ganda Singh Datt, a Sikh soldier in the British Indian Army. It lies on the border with Eastern Punjab, India. The Pakistani village, named after a Sikh man, lies opposite the Indian village of Hussainiwala, which in turn was named after a Muslim man.

== India Pakistan Border ==
=== Border crossing ===
The border crossing is now closed. In the 1960s and 1970s, it was the principal road crossing between India and Pakistan, but was replaced by the border crossing at Wagah, a little further north. In 2005 there were proposals to reopen the border. Later, then Chief Minister of Punjab Shahbaz Sharif proposed the reopening of the border when he visited Attari in India, but it has remained closed.

=== Border ceremony ===
Since 1970, a daily 6 pm Beating Retreat Border Ceremony is jointly held at the border crossing by the militaries of both nations. It is similar to the Attari-Wagah border ceremony. Attendees are seated close by, as compared to Wagah where crowds are kept far apart. Known for the two bordering villages, the Ganda Singh Wala-Hussainiwala border ceremony is attended mostly by the local Punjabis on either side of the border.

== See also ==
- Attari-Wagah border crossing
- Hussainiwala-Ganda Singh Wala border crossing
