= Hussainiwala railway station =

Railway station in Punjab, India

General information
- Location: Hussainiwala Border road, Firozpur district-152002 Punjab; India
- Coordinates: 30°59′27″N 74°33′18″E
- Elevation: 231.52 metres (759.6 ft)
- System: Indian Railways station
- Owner: Indian Railways
- Operator: Northern Railway zone
- Platforms: 1
- Tracks: 1

Construction
- Structure type: Standard on ground
- Parking: Yes

Other information
- Status: Functioning (2 time in a year)
- Station code: HSW
- Zone(s): Northern Railway
- Division(s): Firozpur

History
- Opened: 1885
Location
- Location within Punjab

Hussainiwala railway station is a railway station in Hussainiwala village Firozpur district in Punjab state, India.

== History ==
It was established during the partition of India and Pakistan. It was located near the Irrigation department workshop. However, over time the station has ceased to exist and only a Pipal tree remains as a symbol of its historical importance.

It served as the Gateway to Lahore. The railway track that runs along the station was first used for train travel in 1885 when a journey between Ferozepur and Kasur (now in Pakistan) en route to Peshawar was completed. Presently, the track is used only twice a year for special events. The Ferozepur-Hussainiwala rail track was a hub of trade and military activities in the past, with hundreds of people from nearby towns like Kasur, Lahore and Ferozepur disembarking at the station to work in the workshop. The track was also the route for the first run of the Punjab Mail that linked Ferozepur with Bombay. The railway line was created for the convenience of British troops and merchants, who would arrive in Bombay and travel directly to Kasur, Lahore, Ferozepur and Peshawar by rail.

Sources in the Indian Railways indicate that the rail track crossed the Sutlej River over 13 round pillars, all of which still remain intact, and a double-decker bridge called Empress Bridge. Presently, only the two towers on either side of the Sutlej remain as a reminder of the bridge's existence.

== Trains ==
The special diesel multiple unit (DMU) run by the Northern Railway during Shaheedi Diwas and Baisakhi takes people to the Samadhi Sthal located near Hussainiwala railway station.

== See also ==
- Hussainiwala
- Hussainiwala National Martyrs Memorial
