= Agha Haider =

Barrister and judge

Sayyad Agha Haider (also spelt as Syed Agha Hyder) (1876−1947) was a barrister and judge in British India. He is known for refusing to impose the death sentence on Bhagat Singh, Sukhdev Thapar and Shivaram Rajguru in the 1930 Lahore conspiracy case. He was a former judge of the Lahore High Court.

== Family ==
Haider had a son, Zargham Haider (who died at age 12), and two daughters, Ameer Bano and Shehar Bano.

== Biography ==
He was born in 1876 in a Zamindar family in Saharanpur. In 1904, he started practicing as a lawyer in Allahabad High Court, where he was later elevated to the bench. He was appointed as a judge in the Lahore High Court in 1925.

He was a member of the Lahore Conspiracy Case Special Tribunal at Lahore to try Bhagat Singh, Sukhdev, Rajguru and other Indian revolutionaries for waging war against the British Empire. He was the only Indian member of the tribunal. The other tribunal members were Justice J. Coldstream, who was the panel chairman and Justice G.C. Hilton. On 12 May 1930, Bhagat Singh and his compatriots were brought to Poonch House in Lahore, where the trial was held.

In protest against being handcuffed, Singh and his comrades refused to disembark from the police bus, shouting slogans and singing patriotic songs instead. Justice J. Coldstream ordered the police to use some force (though it may be possible that the police used extreme force, contradicting the orders) on them in the courtroom, which was objected to by Justice Haider, who refused to sign the day's proceedings and recorded his dissent.

I was not a party to the order of the removal of the accused from the court to the jail and I was not responsible for it anyway. I disassociate myself from all that took place today in consequence of that order.

— Statement recorded by Justice Haider in a 12 May 1930 order.

He had objected to the lack of even-handedness in the Lahore Conspiracy Case trial. Justice Agha Haider was removed by the British Government from the tribunal because he questioned the witnesses closely and repeatedly dissociated himself in writing from their orders, unlike the two European judges. While dissenting with British judges in the Bhagat Singh case, Justice Haider said, I am a judge, not a butcher.

Syed Agha Haider died on 5 February 1947, in Saharanpur, Uttar Pradesh.

== See also ==
- Shadi Lal
- Abdul Qadir
- Lahore Conspiracy Case trial
