= Abdul Qadir (jurist) =

Newspaper and magazine editor in British India

Sir Sheikh Abdul Qadir
- شیخ عبد
- Qadir in the late 1930s
- Born: 15 March 1874; Ludhiana, British Raj (now Punjab, India)
- Died: 9 February 1950 (aged 75); Lahore, Punjab, Pakistan
- Resting place: Miani Sahib Graveyard, Lahore, Punjab, Pakistan
- Occupation: Jurist • newspaper editor • Muslim community leader
- Writing career
- Years active: 1898 – 1950; Judge of Lahore High Court (1921); Minister of Education (1935); Leader of Anjuman-i-Himayat-i-Islam (1941); Chief Judge of Bahawalpur (1944)
- Notable works: Editor of Observer (1898); Al-Makhzan (1901)

Sir Sheikh Abdul Qadir (15 March 1874 – 9 February 1950) was a Pakistani jurist, newspaper and magazine editor and a Muslim community leader in British India. He was a judge of Lahore High Court in 1921.

He led the famous Muslim organization, Anjuman-i-Himayat-i-Islam and used his position as the leader of this organization to form other, pro-partition, organizations. He was an early activist of the Pakistan Movement.

== Early life and career ==
Qadir was born in Ludhiana on 15 March 1874. He received his education at the Forman Christian College, Lahore, British India. He was the editor of The Observer, the first Muslim-owned newspaper published in English in 1895. In 1901, he launched the magazine Al-Makhzan, an Urdu language publication. This magazine published the early works of Muhammad Iqbal.

In 1904, Qadir went to study law in London, and was called to the bar in 1907 at Lincoln's Inn after which he returned to India, where he served as a member of the Punjab Legislative Council and the minister of education in Punjab, British India in 1925.

He is famously well known for being a judge of the Lahore Conspiracy Case tribunal constituted in May 1930, and especially for speeding up the trial of the suspects for the murder of Lahore Assistant Superintendent J. P. Saunders. The suspects also included the famous revolutionaries Bhagat Singh, Sukhdev and Rajguru. The trials were held at Poonch House registrar in Lahore. He was the second native Indian judge chosen after the reconstitution of the Tribunal in June after Justice Agha Haider of the first Tribunal had been removed on calumny charges for not maintaining neutrality during the trial. The final judgement that was pronounced in October 1930 was under his jurisdiction. He represented British India at the Organisation of the League of Nations in 1926.

Qadir was knighted by the British in the 1927 Birthday Honours and in 1935 became a member of the governing council of India.

== Death and survivors ==
Sheikh Abdul Qadir died on 9 February 1950 at the age of 75 and was buried in Miani Sahib Graveyard, Lahore, Pakistan.

Sarvepalli Radhakrishnan and Mohandas Karamchand Gandhi's book Mahatma Gandhi contains a chapter by Qadir, where he particularly relates his various experiences with the understanding of Gandhi in Europe in the 1930s.

His son, Manzur Qadir, was a prominent Pakistani jurist who served as the Foreign Minister of Pakistan during the military rule of Ayub Khan.
