= Martyrs' Day (India) =

Series of holidays in India

Martyrs' Day (at the national level also known as Sarvodaya day or Shaheed Diwas) are days declared in India to honour recognised martyrs of the nation.

== National observance ==
=== 30 January ===
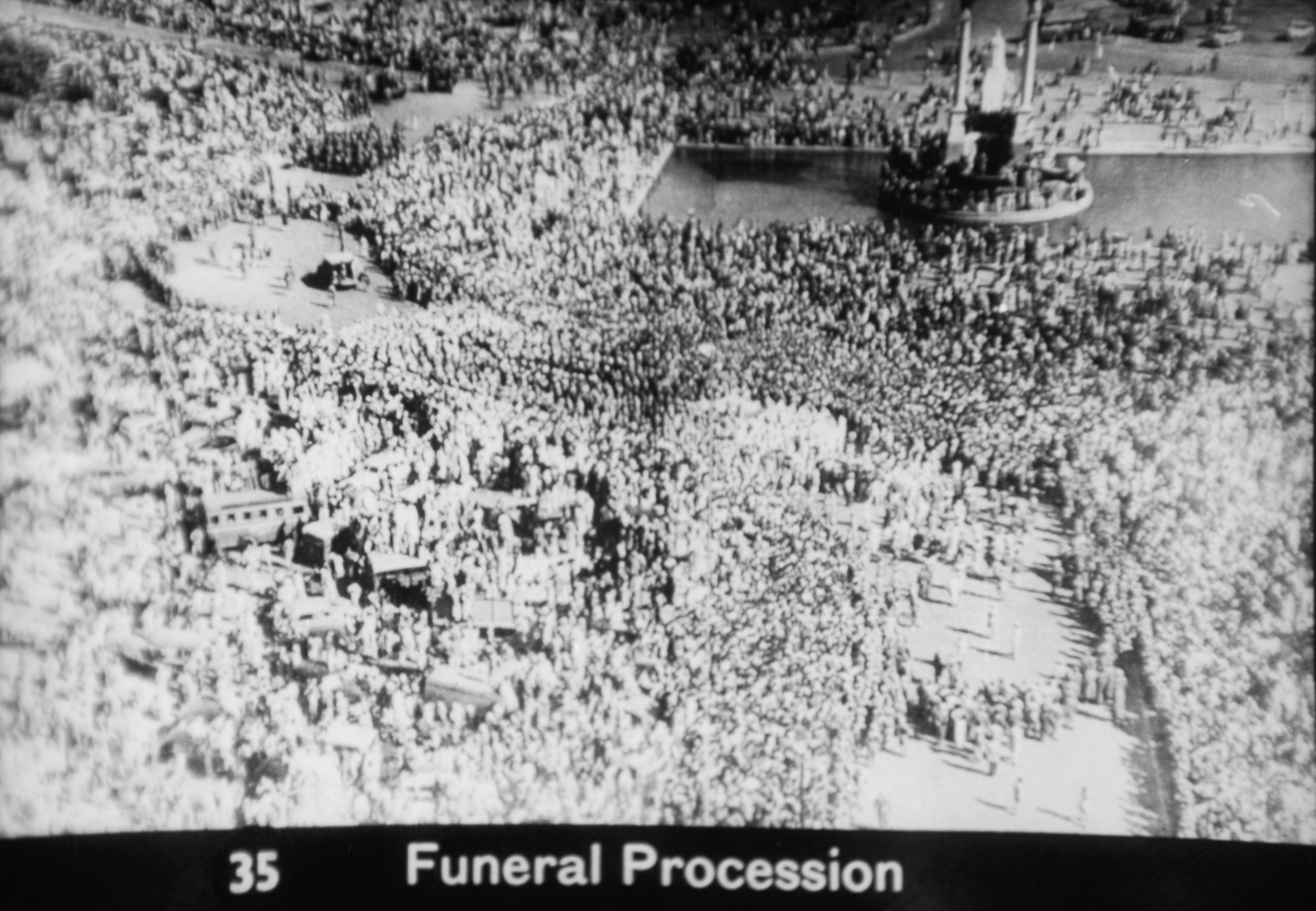
30 January is a national level Martyr' Day recognising the date Mahatma Gandhi was assassinated (funeral procession pictured)

Martyrs' Day is recognised nationally on 30 January to mark the assassination of Mahatma Gandhi in 1948, by Nathuram Godse. On Martyrs' Day the President, the Vice President, the Prime Minister, the Defence Minister, the Chief of Defence Staff and the three Service Chiefs gather at the samadhi at Raj Ghat memorial and lay wreaths decorated with multi-colour flowers. The armed forces' personnel blow bugles, sounding the Last Post. The inter-services contingent reverse arms as a mark of respect. A two-minute silence in memory of Indian martyrs is observed throughout the country at 11 am. Participants hold all-religion prayers and sing tributes.

== Other recognised dates ==
=== 15 February ===
In 2022, the government of Bihar recognised 15 February as Martyrs' Day (Shahid Diwas) in memory of 34 freedom fighters killed by the Indian Imperial Police in Tarapur during the hoisting of an Indian Flag on 15 February 1932.

=== 23 March ===
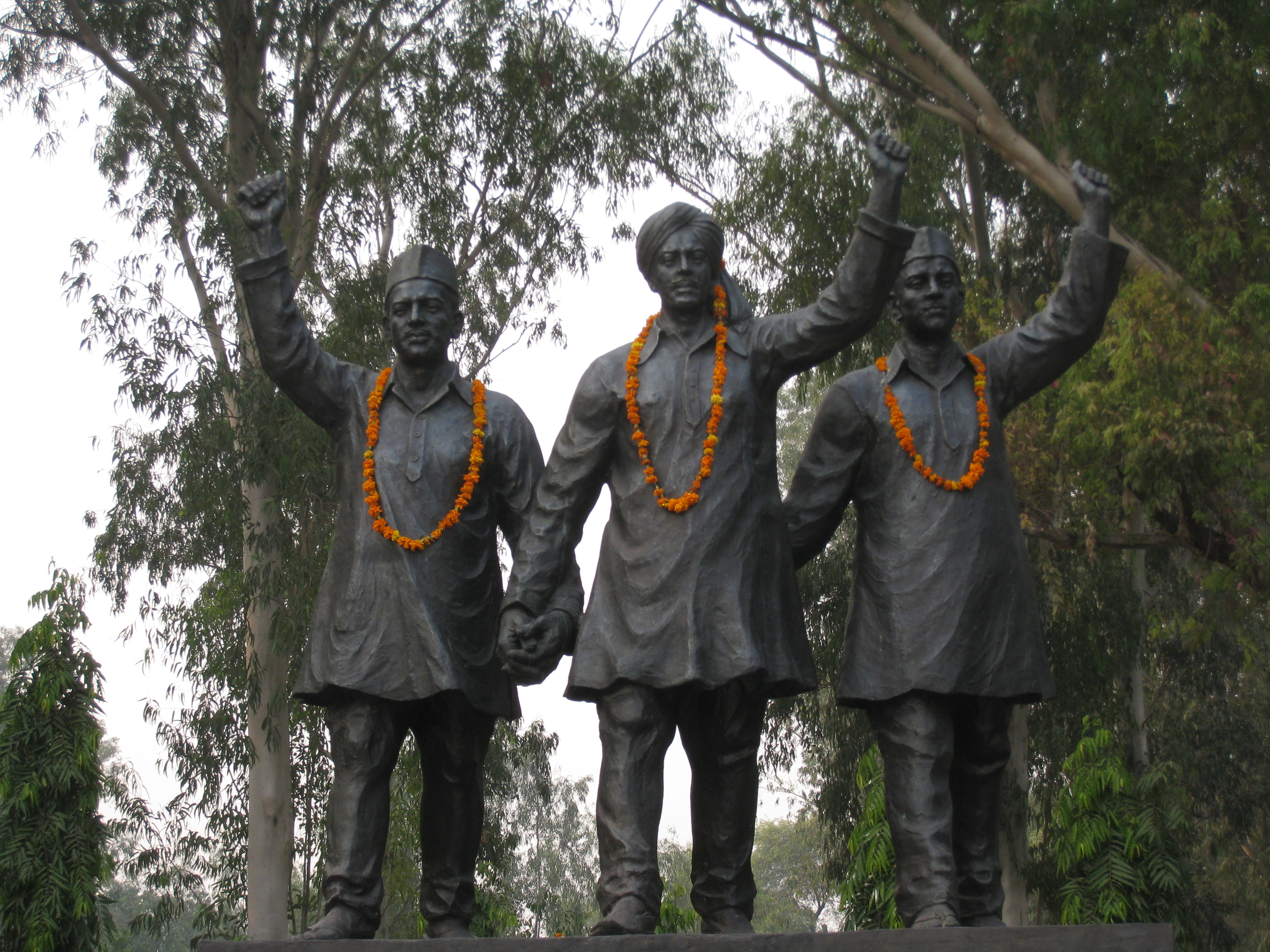
Statues of Bhagat Singh, Rajguru and Sukhdev

The anniversary of the deaths of Bhagat Singh, Sukhdev Thapar and Shivaram Rajguru on 23 March 1931, in Lahore, is recognised as a Martyrs' Day.

=== 19 May ===
19 May is recognised as Bhasha Shaheed Divas ("Language Martyrs' Day") in the Barak Valley, recognising the deaths of 11 people killed during the Bengali Language Movement. The movement, which took place in the Barak Valley in the state of Assam, was a protest against the decision of the Government of Assam to make Assamese the only official language of the state even though a significant proportion of the population were Bengali people. In the Barak Valley, the Sylheti-speaking population constitute the majority of the population. The main incident, in which 11 people were killed by state police, took place on 19 May 1961 at Silchar railway station.(Raktim Diganta, Natun Diganta Prakashani, Silchar, Assam).

=== 21 October ===
21 October is Police Martyrs' Day (or Police Commemoration Day), observed by police departments nationwide. On this date in 1958 a Central Reserve Police Force patrol at the Indo-Tibetan border in Ladakh was ambushed by Chinese forces, as part of the ongoing Sino-Indian border dispute.

=== 17 November ===
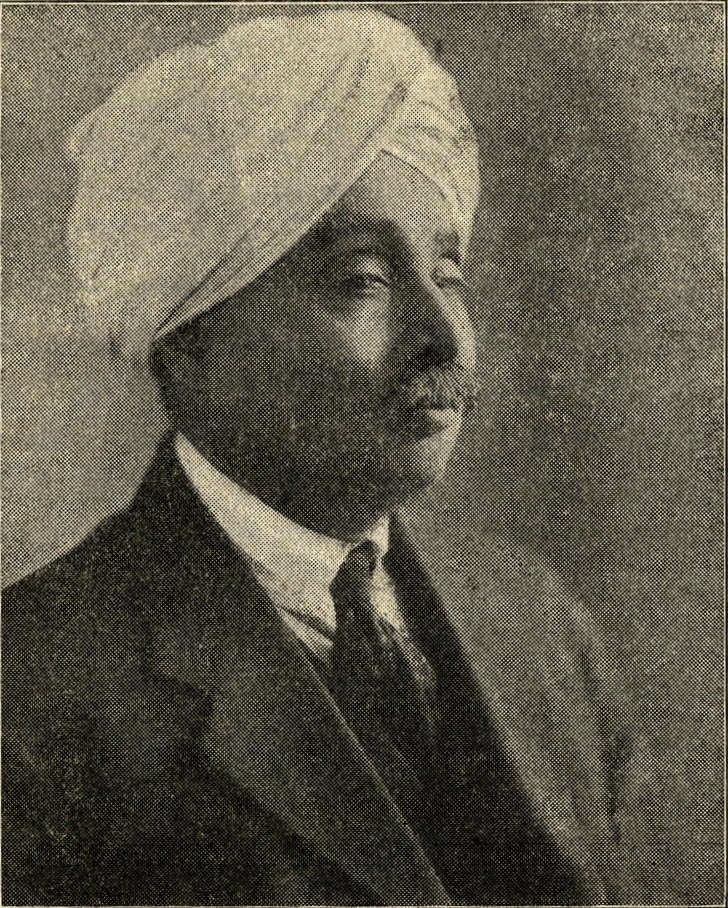
Odisha observes 17 November as Martyrs' Day in honour of independence leader Lala Lajpat Rai

Odisha observes 17 November, the death anniversary of Lala Lajpat Rai (1864–1927), the "Lion of Punjab", a leader in the Indian fight for freedom from the British Raj.

=== 19 November ===
19 November is the birthday of Rani Lakshmibai who was born in 1828. She was queen of the Maratha-ruled princely state of Jhansi, where Martyrs' Day is observed in the region and honours those who gave their lives in the rebellion of 1857, of which she was a leading figure.

=== 24 November ===
The death anniversary of the ninth Sikh Guru Tegh Bahadur in 1674, who was executed by the Mughal emperor Aurangzeb, is observed as Martyrs' Day.

== See also ==
- Martyrs' Day
