= New Delhi–Firozpur main line =

Railway line in India

New Delhi–Firozpur railway route

Overview
- Native name: नई दिल्ली–फ़िरोज़पुर रेल मार्ग
- Status: Operational
- Owner: Indian Railways
- Locale: Haryana, Punjab
- Termini: New Delhi railway station; Firozpur Junction

Service
- Operator: Northern Railway

History
- Opened: 1897

Technical
- Track length: 386/486 KM
- Number of tracks: 2
- Track gauge: 5 ft 6 in (1,676 mm) broad gauge
- Electrification: Fully Electrified
- Highest elevation: New Delhi 239 m (784 ft), Firozpur Junction 182 m (597 ft)

The New Delhi–Firozpur railway route connects New Delhi with Firozpur Cantt railway station in Punjab. There are several rail routes between New Delhi and Firozpur Cantt, passing through different parts of Haryana and Punjab.

The main routes are:

- Via Narwana–Jakhal–Bathinda: approximately 386 km
- Via Narwana–Jakhal–Dhuri–Ludhiana: approximately 452 km
- Via Rohtak–Hisar–Sirsa–Bathinda: approximately 420 km
- Via Sonipat–Panipat–Kurukshetra–Ambala–Rajpura Junction–Patiala–Dhuri–Bathinda: approximately 486 km
- Via Sonipat–Panipat–Kurukshetra–Ambala–Rajpura Junction–Ludhiana: approximately 435 km

The distances are approximate and can vary depending on the route and stations used.

The route is under the administrative jurisdiction of the Northern Railway. Historically, it formed part of the Delhi–Karachi railway line.

== History ==
The Southern Punjab Railway Co. opened the 711 km (442 mi) long Delhi–Jind-Bhatinda–Fazilka-Bahawalnagar-Samma Satta line in 1897. The line passed through Rohtak-Jind-Bhatinda-Muktasar-Fazilka-Bahawalnagar and provided direct connection through Samma Satta (now in Pakistan) to Karachi. The extension from the Macleodganj (later renamed Mandi Sadiqganj and now in Pakistan) railway line to Ambala via Qasamwala-Hindumalkote-Abohar-Bhatinda-Patiala was opened by the same company in 1902. In 1901–02, the Jodhpur–Bathinda line of Rajputana–Malwa Railway was extended from Bikaner to Bathinda via Hanumangarh, to connect it with the metre-gauge section of the Bombay, Baroda and Central India Railway to the south and the metre-gauge of North Western Railway's Delhi–Fazilka line (Delhi–Hisar–Bhatinda–Karachi line) to the north. In 2000s, Jodhpur-Bikaner-Bathinda line was converted to broad gauge. In 2009, the metre gauge Hisar-Sadulpur section was converted to broad gauge.

== Border crossings ==
Fazilka and Hussainiwala on this line are two defunct railway border crossing points on the India–Pakistan border. Before partition of India in 1947, there were the 711-kilometer (442-mile) long Delhi-Samma Satta and the 445-kilometer (277-mile) long Delhi-Raiwind railway lines, which were operational. After partition of India, a 20-kilometer (12-mile) line linked Amruka on the Pakistan side of the India–Pakistan border, opposite Fazilka, towards Samma Satta. The only train running through these tracks was withdrawn after 1965 war. The 275-kilometer (171-mile) long Amruka-Samma Satta line and the 28-kilometre (17-mile) long Kasur-Raiwind lines are operational in Pakistan now. The Hussainiwala–Ganda Singh Wala railway crossing, near Firozpur, became defunct with the partition of India. The 16-kilometer (9.9-mile) broad gauge line from Kasur Junction in Pakistan has been closed. The strategically important 1,681-metre (5,515-foot) Kaiser-E-Hind Rail cum Road Bridge was blown up during the Indo-Pakistani War of 1971 at Hussainiwala, and was never rebuilt. In 2013, Sutlej Barrage Bridge on Hussainiwala was opened after restructuring.

== Electrification ==
The Okhla–New Delhi–Shakurbasti line was electrified in 1982–83. As of 2011, only 3 km of the 60 km Shakurbasti–Rohtak was remaining. The EMU services of Delhi Suburban Railway was extended up to Rohtak in 2013.

After electrification up to Rohtak, further electrification begun in February 2015. Electrification up to Jind Junction was completed in 2017. Operations of electric locos up to Jind begin in January 2018. After this, electrification up to Bathinda Junction got completed in March 2018.

Electrification of Kurukshetra–Narwana and Jind–Panipat branch lines was started in 2018 and has been completed in 2019.

Electrification of Jind–Sonipat branch line is also under planning.

Electrification of Bathinda-Firozpur branch line is in progress.

== Tracks ==
Delhi–Bathinda is a double electric line.

The construction of Bathinda-Firozpur single line electrification is in under progress.

== Sheds ==
Shakurbasti has a diesel loco shed. It houses WDS-4A, WDS-4B, WDS-4D, WDM-2 WDM3A, WDS6 and DEMUs. It also has a broad-gauge trip shed for WDM-2 and WDG-3A locos. WDS-4 shunting locos based all over Northern Railway are sent here for periodical maintenance.

== Developments ==
The 42 km (26 mi) new 5 ft 6 in (1,676 mm) broad gaugeline between Fazilka and Abohar was opened in 2012.

The Rewari–Rohtak line was commissioned in 2013.

Work for a new line from Rohtak to Hansi via Meham was inaugurated in 2013.

A new line from Jind to Sonipat was completed in 2015 and is operational now.

Central Government approved a new rail line from Jind to Hansi via Narnaund.

== Railway reorganisation ==
Southern Punjab Railway was taken over by the state and merged with North Western Railway in 1930.

With the partition of India in 1947, North Western Railway was split. While the western portion became Pakistan West Railway, and later Pakistan Railways, the eastern part became Eastern Punjab Railway.

In 1952, Northern Railway was formed with a portion of East Indian Railway Company, west of Mughalsarai, Bikaner Railway and Eastern Punjab Railway.

== Stations ==
- Julana railway station (29.1268°N 76.3798°E) is in the Julana tehsil of Jind District 91 kilometres (57 mi) from Delhi on the Delhi–Fazilka line.
