= Hussainiwala National Martyrs Memorial =

Monument in the Punjab, India

- हुसैनीवाला राष्ट्रीय शहीदी स्मारक, पंजाब, भारत
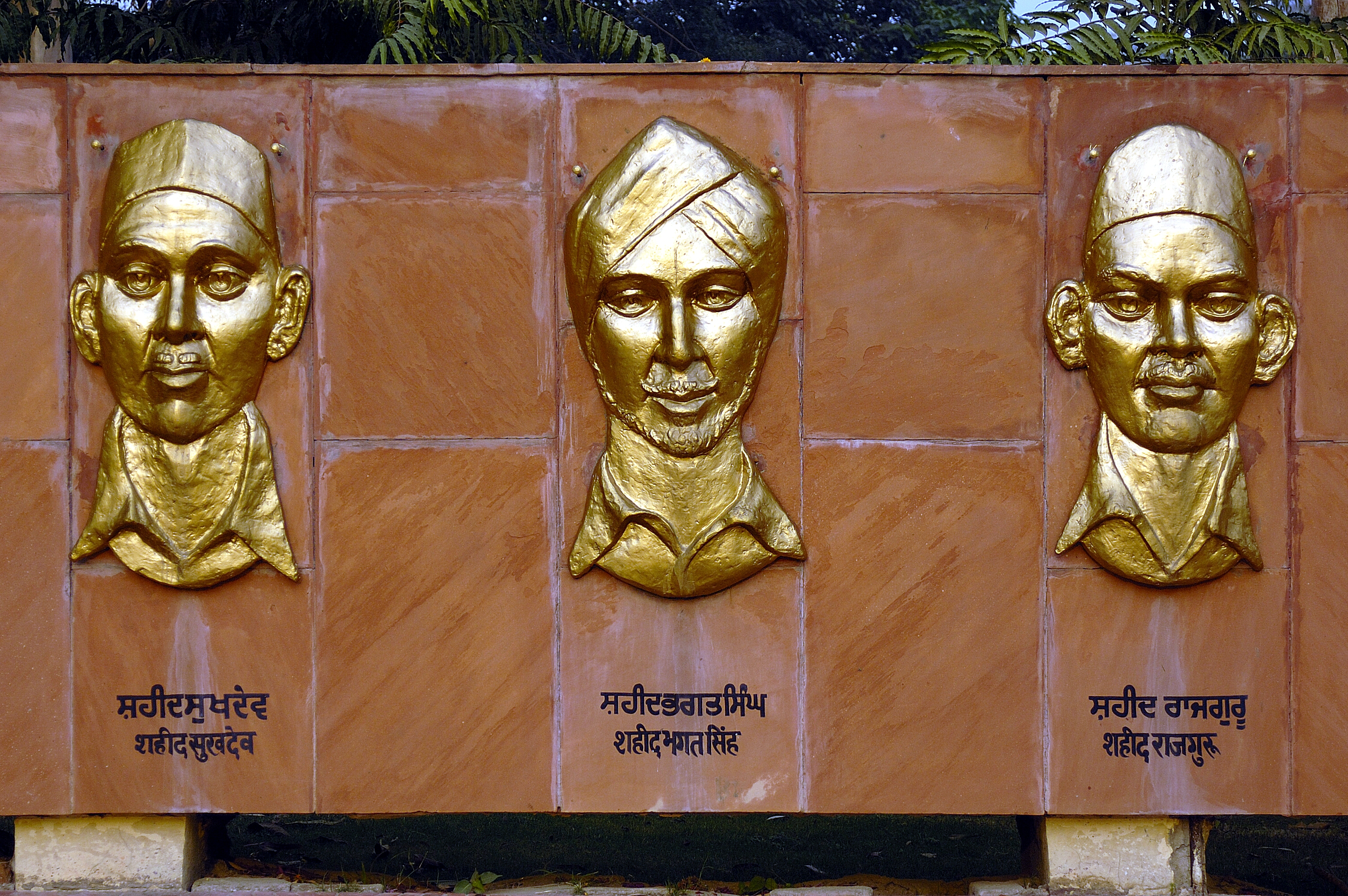
- Statues of Bhagat Singh, Rajguru and Sukhdev National Martyrs Memorial
- Interactive map of Hussainiwala National Martyrs Memorial
- Location: Hussainiwala, Firozpur district, Punjab, India
- Coordinates: 30°59′51″N 74°32′49″E
- Designer: Government of Punjab, India
- Type: Memorial wall and statue
- Material: Brick, mortar, marble and metal
- Opening date: 1968
- Dedicated to: Bhagat Singh, Shivaram Rajguru and Sukhdev Thapar
- Website: www.ferozepur.nic.in/html/HUSSAINIWALA.html

Hussainiwala National Martyrs Memorial (हुसैनीवाला राष्ट्रीय शहीदी स्मारक, पंजाब, भारत) in memory of the Indian freedom fighters Bhagat Singh, Sukhdev Thapar and Shivaram Rajguru, is at Hussainiwala village, near Firozpur city in Firozpur district of the Punjab, India. A daily flag lowering ceremony, similar to the Wagah-Attari border ceremony is also held here jointly by the Indian and Pakistani armed forces.

== Martyrs Memorial ==
The memorial marks the location on the banks of the Sutlej river where Bhagat Singh, Sukhdev, and Rajguru were cremated on 23 March 1931. After they were hanged in the Lahore Central Jail, the back wall was broken by the jail authorities, and their bodies were secretly brought to this memorial and cremated without any ceremony. The BSF has showcased the pistol with which Bhagat Singh killed British officer Saunders. It is also the cremation place of Batukeshwar Dutt, who died in 1965 and had also been involved in bombing the Central Legislative Assembly with Singh. His last wish was to be cremated at the same place. The mother of Bhagat Singh, Vidyawati, was also cremated there in accordance with her last wish.

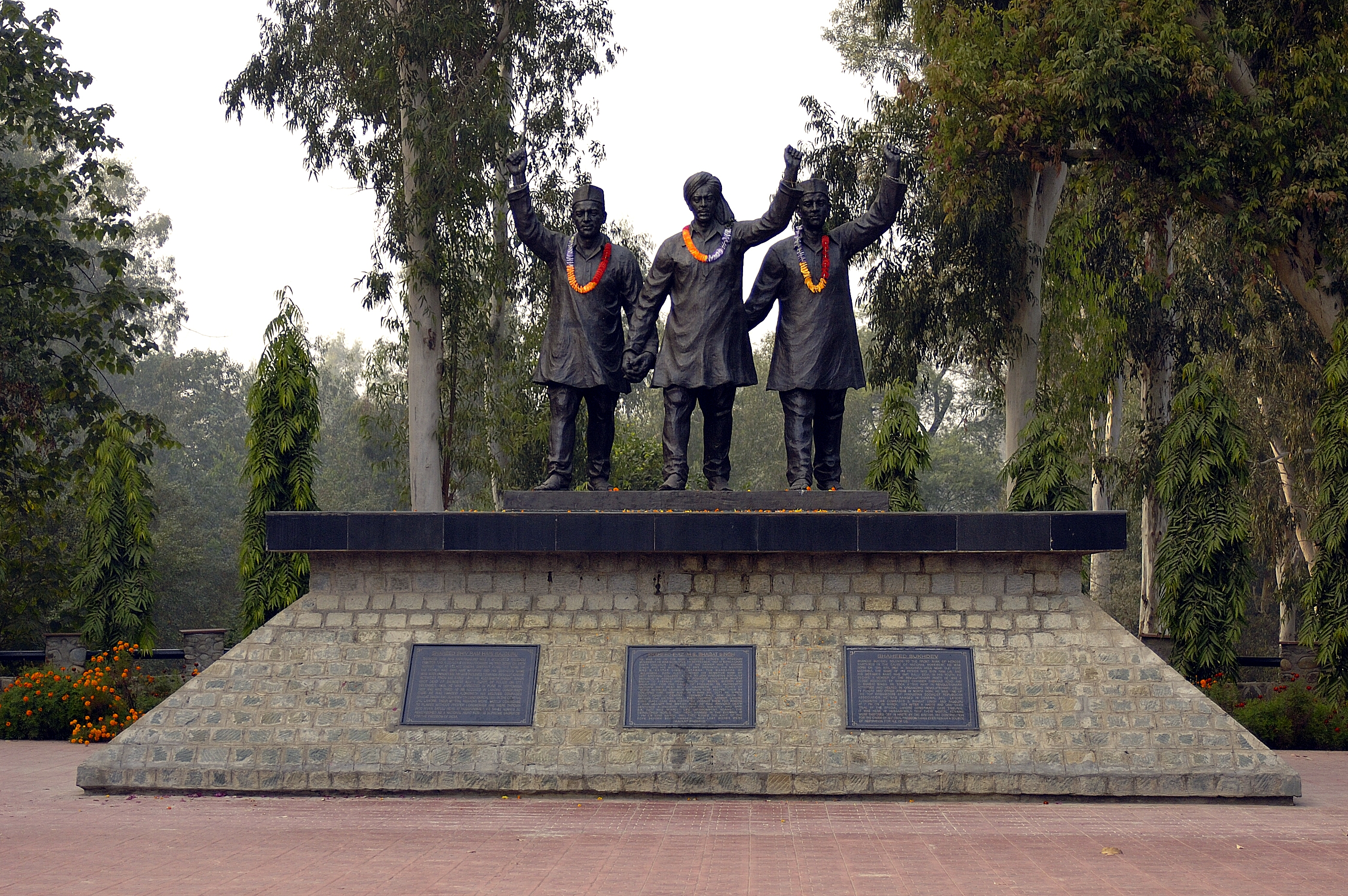
National Martyrs Memorial for Sukhdev, Bhagat Singh and Rajguru

The memorial was built in 1968 and is located 1 kilometre (0.62 mi) from the border of India and Pakistan border, on the Indian side.

== Annual mela ==
Every year, on 23 March, the Shaheedi Mela is observed at the memorial. The day is also observed across the state of Punjab.

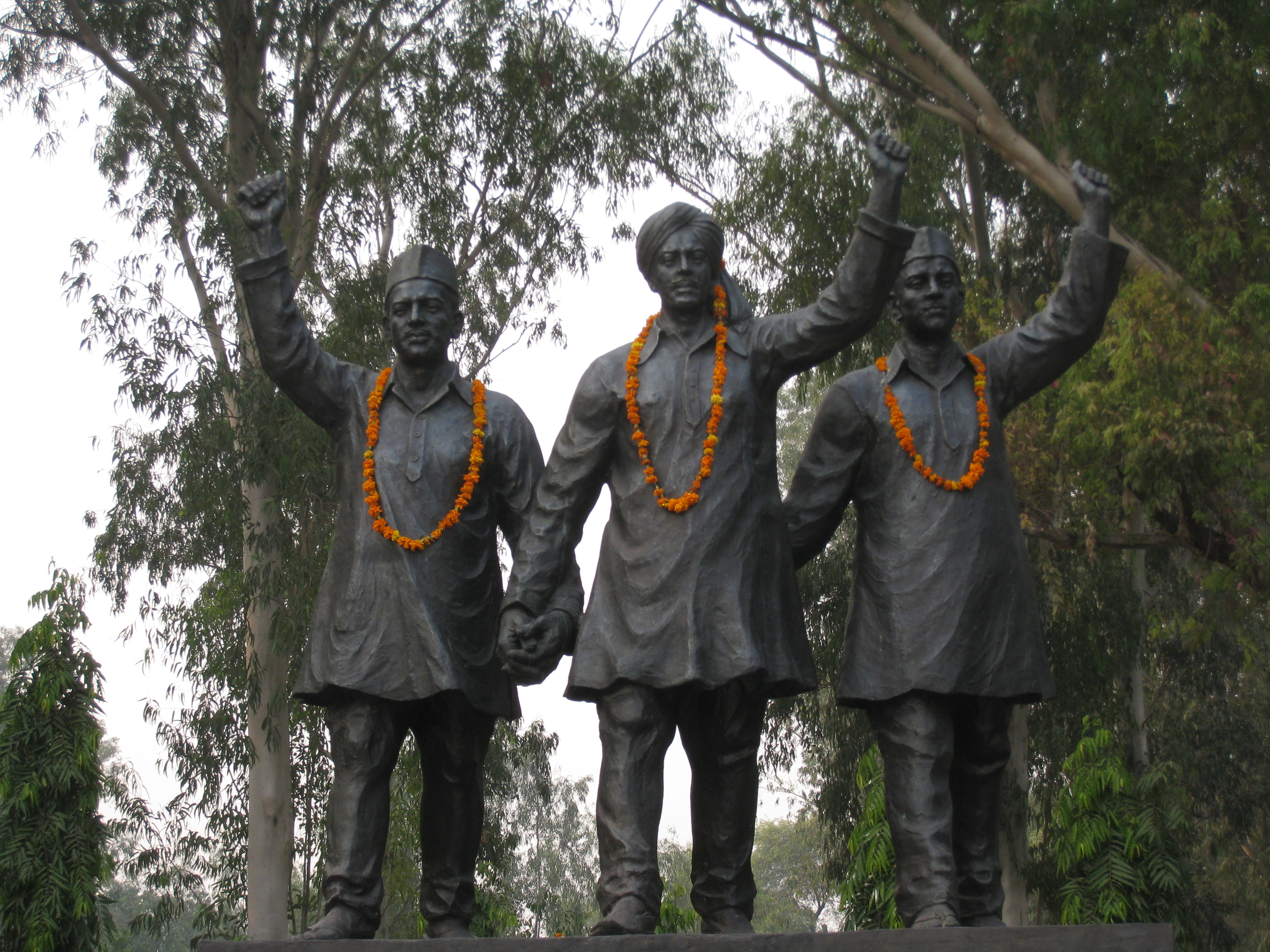
Statues of Bhagat Singh, Rajguru and Sukhdev

== Flag lowering ceremony ==
A daily ceremony is held here in the evening at Hussainiwala-Ganda Singh Wala border.

== See also ==
- Border ceremonies of India
- Borders of India
- Jallianwala Bagh
- Look-East Connectivity projects
- Look East policy (India)
