= Jind Junction railway station =

Railway Station in Haryana, India

Jind Junction
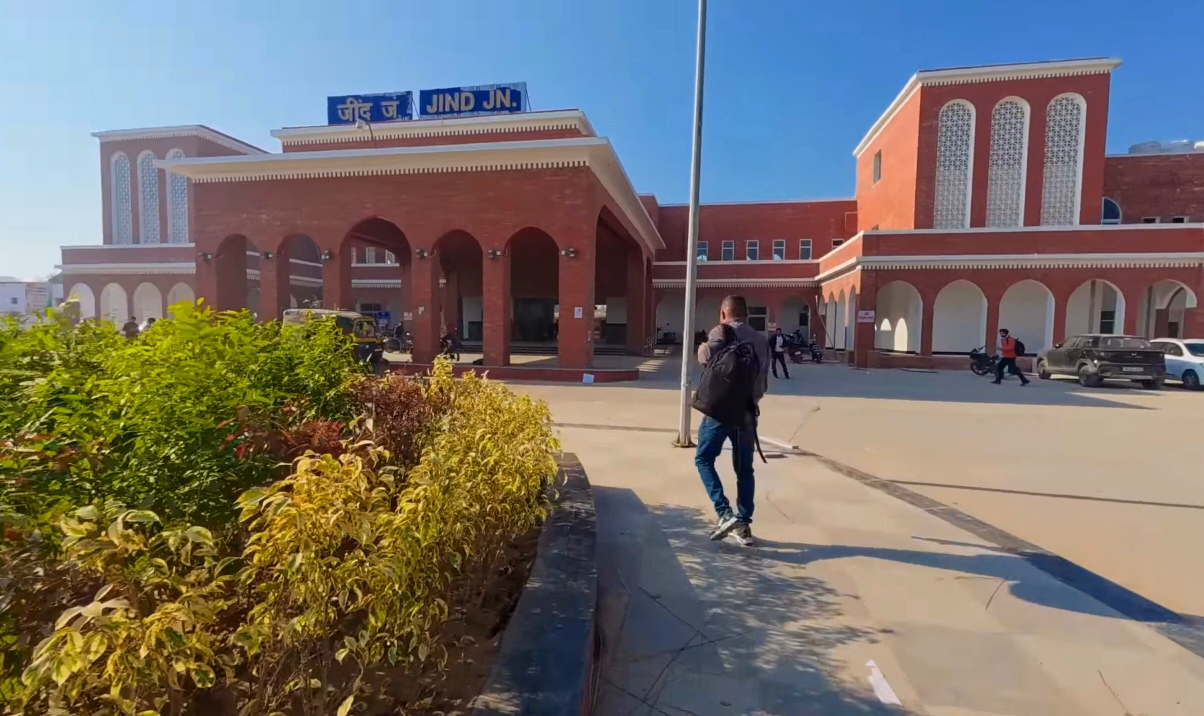
- Jind Junction

General information
- Location: Railway Station Road, Jind, Haryana; India
- Coordinates: 29°19′47″N 76°17′19″E
- Elevation: 222 metres (728 ft)
- System: Indian Railways junction station
- Owner: Ministry of Railways (India)
- Operator: Indian Railways
- Lines: Delhi–Fazilka line, Panipat–Jind branch line, Sonipat–Jind branch line
- Platforms: 4
- Tracks: 9( 5 behind platform 4) (2 in between i.e.platforms 1and 2) And ( 2 terminating tracks)

Construction
- Structure type: At grade
- Parking: Yes
- Cycle facilities: No

Other information
- Status: Functioning
- Station code: JIND
- Zone(s): Northern Railway
- Division(s): Delhi

History
- Opened: 1858

Passengers
- 25,000

Services
Preceding station	Indian Railways	Following station
Bisanpur towards ?	Northern Railway zone Delhi–Fazilka line	Barsola towards ?
Jind City towards ?	Northern Railway zone Panipat–Jind branch line	Terminus
Pandu Pindara Junction towards ?	Northern Railway zone Sonipat–Jind branch line	Terminus
Location
- Location within Haryana

Jind Junction railway station is located in Jind district in the Indian state of Haryana and serves Jind.

== The railway station ==
Jind Junction railway station is at an elevation of 222 metres (728 ft) and was assigned the code – JIND.

== History ==
In 1897, Southern Punjab Railway Co. opened the Delhi–Bhatinda–Samasatta line and this station was built. The line passed through Muktasar and Fazilka tehsils and provided direct connection through Samma Satta (now in Pakistan) to Karachi.

In 2018-19, Rohtak–Bathinda–Lehra Muhabat line was electrified.

In 2025-26, Jind station underwent ₹25.50 crore upgrade with new station building, a hydrogen refilling station for India's first hydrogen fueled train, etc.

== Tracks ==
Delhi–Jakhal–Bhatinda section is double-track electric line.

== See also ==
- Railway in Haryana
- Transport in Delhi
- Transport in Haryana
