= Hussainiwala =

- Village
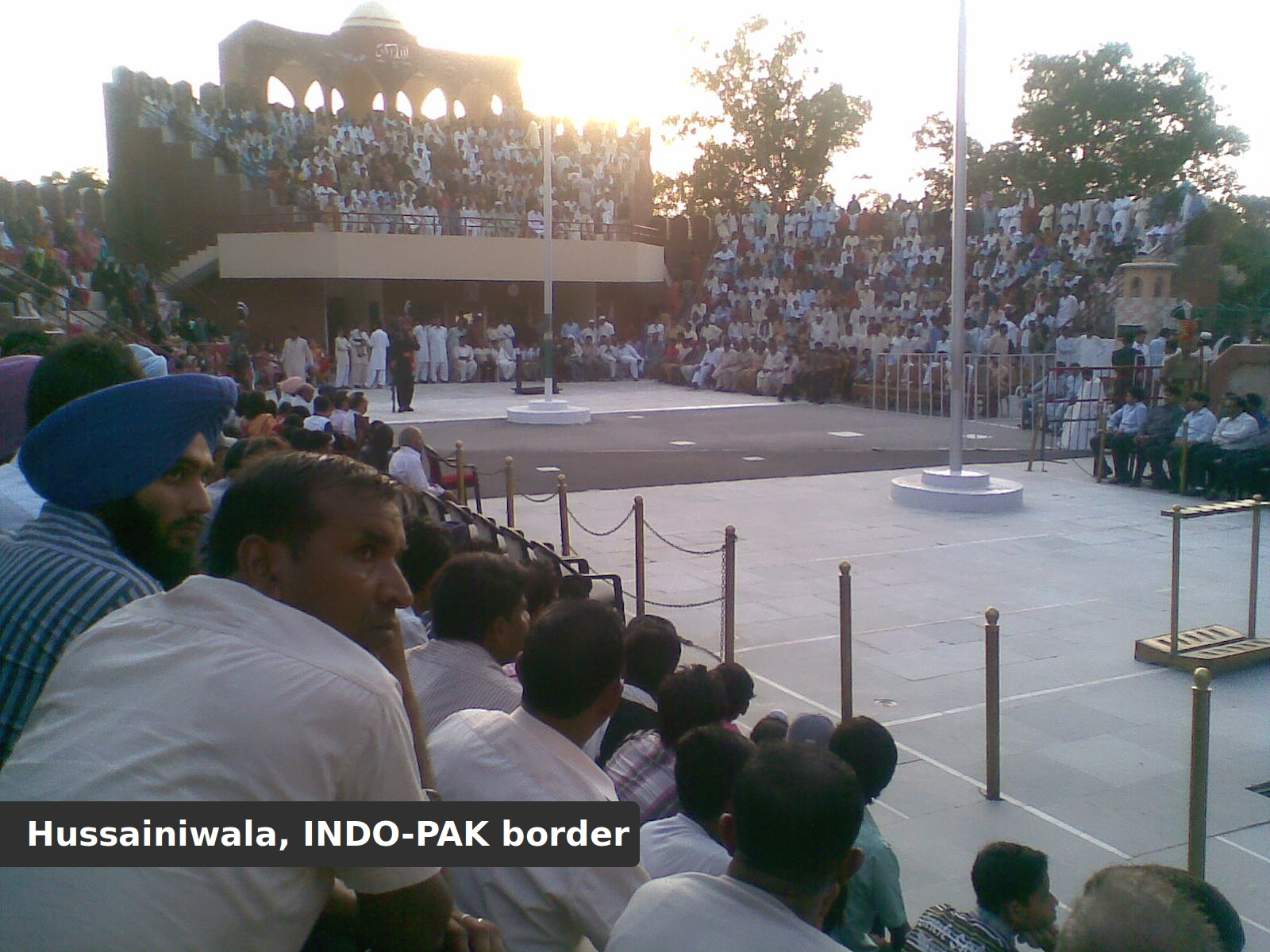
- Flag lowering ceremony at Hussainiwala border, far side is Pakistan and near side is India

- Location in Punjab, India
- Coordinates: 30°59′51.56″N 74°32′49.62″E
- Country: India
- State: Punjab
- District: Firozpur

Languages
  - Official: Punjabi
- Time zone: UTC+5:30 (IST)
- Vehicle registration: PB-05
- Nearest village: Ganda Singh Wala
- Nearest city: Firozpur

Hussainiwala is a village near Firozpur city in Firozpur district in Punjab state, India. It lies near the bank of the Sutlej river. The village is on the border with Pakistan, opposite the Pakistani village of Ganda Singh Wala. It is a border crossing between India and Pakistan that is currently closed, however a daily joint beating retreat border ceremony is held by the two nations. The village is popular for the Hussainiwala National Martyrs Memorial, where Indian freedom fighters ,Bhagat Singh, Sukhdev, Rajguru were cremated on 23 March 1931.

Hussainiwala Headworks is the starting point of Ganga Canal which irrigates Sri Ganganagar and Hanumangarh districts of Rajasthan state.

It is 10 km northwest of district headquarters Firozpur, 100 km (62 mi) south of Amritsar, 135 km (84 mi) west of Ludhiana, 120 km (74.6 mi) northwest of Bathinda, 235 km (146 mi) west of state capital Chandigarh, 265 km (165 mi) northwest from Hisar, and 400 km (248.5 mi) northwest from Delhi.

== Etymology ==
The Hussainiwala village is named after the Muslim Peer Ghulam Hussainiwala (Saint Hussaini wala, or Saint "who is of Husain"), whose tomb is in the Border Security Force (BSF) compound at Hussainiwala. According to other sources, Hussainiwala was named after Hussaini Brahmin, who are the second branch of Mohyal Brahmin.

Across the border, the Ganda Singh Wala village was named after a Sikh soldier of British Indian Army, Ganda Singh Datt.

== History ==
=== Indo-Pakistan War of 1965 ===
At the outbreak of the Indo-Pakistani War of 1965, the 2nd Maratha Light Infantry (also called the Kali Panchwin) was based in Mathura when it deployed a small unit to Hussainiwala in the Firozpur sector of Punjab. During the war, the Kali Panchwin defended Hussainiwala Headworks in Ferozepur sector. It defended the headworks against an attack by a full infantry brigade supported by armoured columns of the Pakistan Army. The tower on the other side of the river was captured and razed to the ground. The battalion launched an attack on the forward two companies supported by tanks, using heavy artillery fire and air support. The Pakistan Army was stalled by the artillery fire, their attack broke up, and they retreated. The Kali Panchwin's commanding officer and battery commander were killed by Pakistani artillery shelling the next morning while supervising operations. The battalion was awarded the battle honour "Hussainiwala" for its role in the 1965 war, its first post-independence battle honour.

=== Indo-Pakistan War of 1971 ===
Hussainiwala was captured by Pakistan during the Indo-Pakistani War of 1971. On 3 December, at 18:35, units from Pakistan's 106th infantry brigade launched an attack on the village, which was defended by the 15th Punjab Battalion (formerly First Patiala). By the night of 4 December, the 15th Punjab had completely withdrawn from the area, which subsequently fell to Pakistan.

Major Kanwaljit Sandhu, an Indian commander, was badly injured, and Major SPS Waraich was reported captured, as were many Junior Commissioned Officers and men as the squadrons were taken by surprise and had little time to get to their bunkers. A Pakistani radio news telecast reported (in Urdu) that "Maj Waraich hamari hiraasat mein hain" ("Maj Waraich is in our custody"). There was a subsequent report that Major Waraich was in a North West Frontier jail. Their current status is unknown. They are listed as missing by the Indian Government along with 52 others, including Major Ashok Suri who wrote a letter to his father in 1975 from Karachi stating that he was alive and well. Pakistan denies holding any of the soldiers who are missing in action.

== India–Pakistan border crossing ==
The Hussainiwala border crossing, 10 km from district headquarters Ferozepur, has a ruined fort, National Martyrs Memorial and a daily beating retreat flag ceremony, all three in the same compound guarded by India's Border Security Forces.

=== Now-defunct historic Hussainiwala railway station ===
Before the partition of India in 1947, there were 711 kilometers (442 miles) long Delhi-Samasata-Lahore (via Firozpur and Hussianiwala) & 445 kilometers (277 miles) long Delhi-Raiwind railway lines (via Fazilka, Sadqi and Sulemankhi), which were operational. After partition of India, a 20 kilometers (12 miles) line linked Amruka on the Pakistan side of the India–Pakistan border, opposite Fazilka, towards Samasata. The only train running through these tracks was withdrawn after 1965 war. 275 kilometers (171 miles) long Samasata–Amruka Branch Line & 28 kilometres (17 miles) long Kasur-Raiwind lines are still operational in Pakistan. The Hussainiwala–Ganda Singh Wala railway crossing, near Firozpur, became defunct with the partition of India. The 16 kilometers (9.9 miles) broad gauge line from Kasur Junction in Pakistan to Husainiwala in India has been closed. A strategically important 1,681 metres (5,515 feet) Kaiser-E-Hind Rail cum Road Bridge was blown up during the Indo-Pakistani War of 1971 at Hussainiwala, and was never rebuilt. In 2013, Sutlej Barrage Bridge on Hussainiwala was opened after restructuring.

Until 1970, it was the principal road crossing between India and Pakistan, and was a trade route for truckers, mostly for the import of Kandahari Angoor (dehydrated grapes) and other fruits and food products from Pakistan and Afghanistan. The border crossing was replaced by the border crossing at Attari, a little further north. The border crossing is now closed for travellers, although a flag retreat ceremony is still held daily.

In 2005, there were proposals to reopen the border, but it remained closed. Hussainiwala Headworks is located at this village across the Sutlej river which supplies irrigation water to Bikaner canal and Eastern canal.

=== Hussainiwala–Ganda Singh Wala border ceremony ===
At the Hussainiwala–Ganda Singh Wala border crossing, a flag beating retreat ceremony has been held every day at 6 pm since 1970 by the military of both nations. It is open to the public and tourists as a tourist attraction. It is similar to the Mahavir/Sadaki near Fazilka and Wagah–Atari border ceremony, though attendees are mostly local Punjabis from either side of the border. As a result, the atmosphere is not as tense as some other border ceremonies, and Indian and Pakistani attendees often smile and wave to one another, and even cheer for each other's guards as they perform the ceremony. At one point during the ceremony, an Indian BSF soldier and a Pakistani Ranger cross over the borderline to collect the flags of their respective nations.

=== National Martyrs Memorial ===
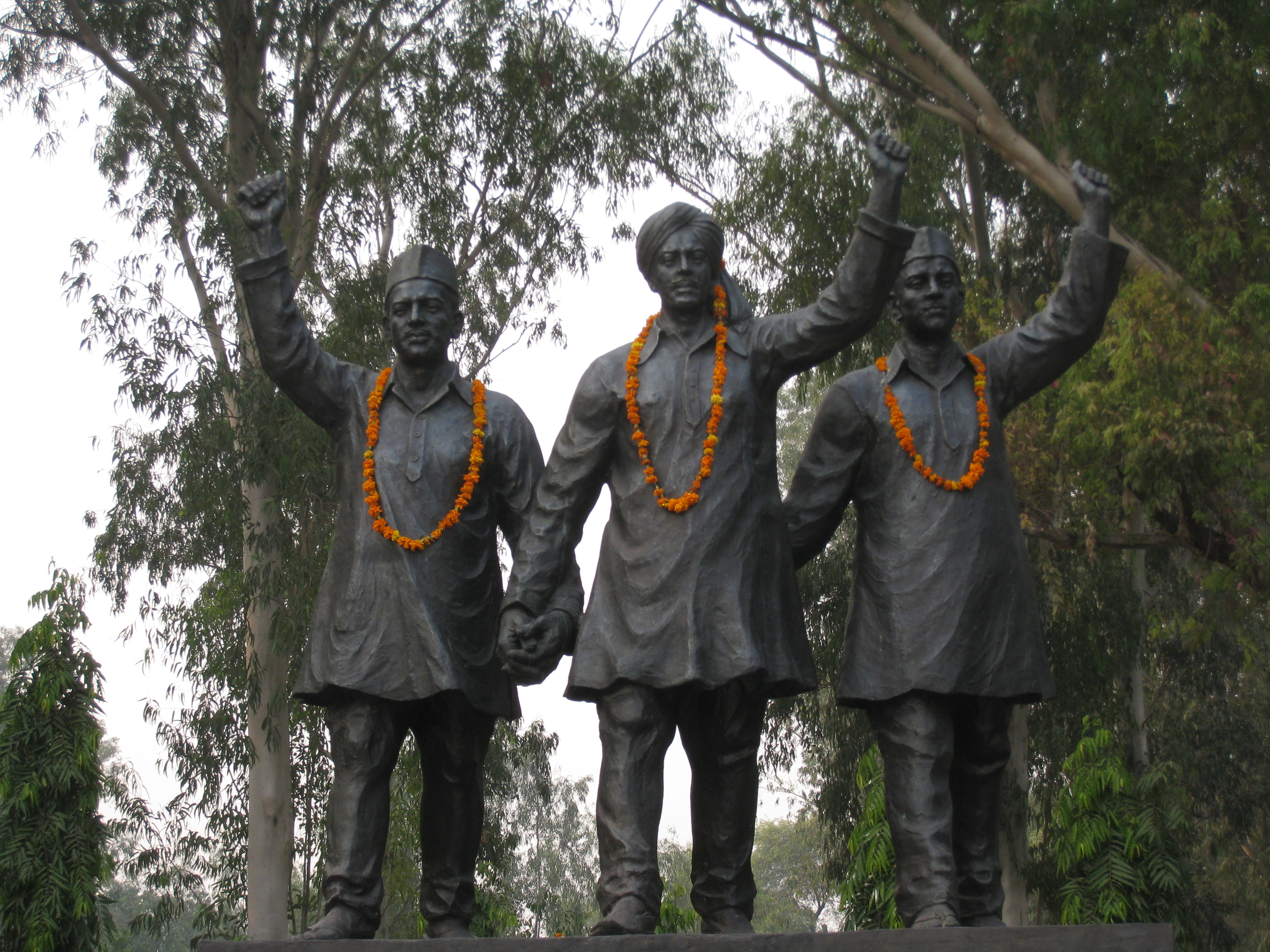
Statues of Bhagat Singh, Rajguru and Sukhdev at the India–Pakistan Border, near Hussainiwala

Hussainniwala is the site of the National Martyrs Memorial, which marks the location where Bhagat Singh, Sukhdev and Rajguru were cremated on 23 March 1931. It is also the cremation place of Batukeshwar Dutt, who was also involved in bombing the Central Legislative Assembly with Singh, and that of Singh's mother, Vidyawati. After the Partition of India, the cremation spot became a part of Pakistan but on 17 January 1961 it was returned to India in exchange for 12 villages near the Sulemanki Headworks (Fazilka).

An annual fair takes place at the memorial on 23 March, which is the anniversary of Singh's death. The day is also observed across the state of Punjab.

== Gallery ==
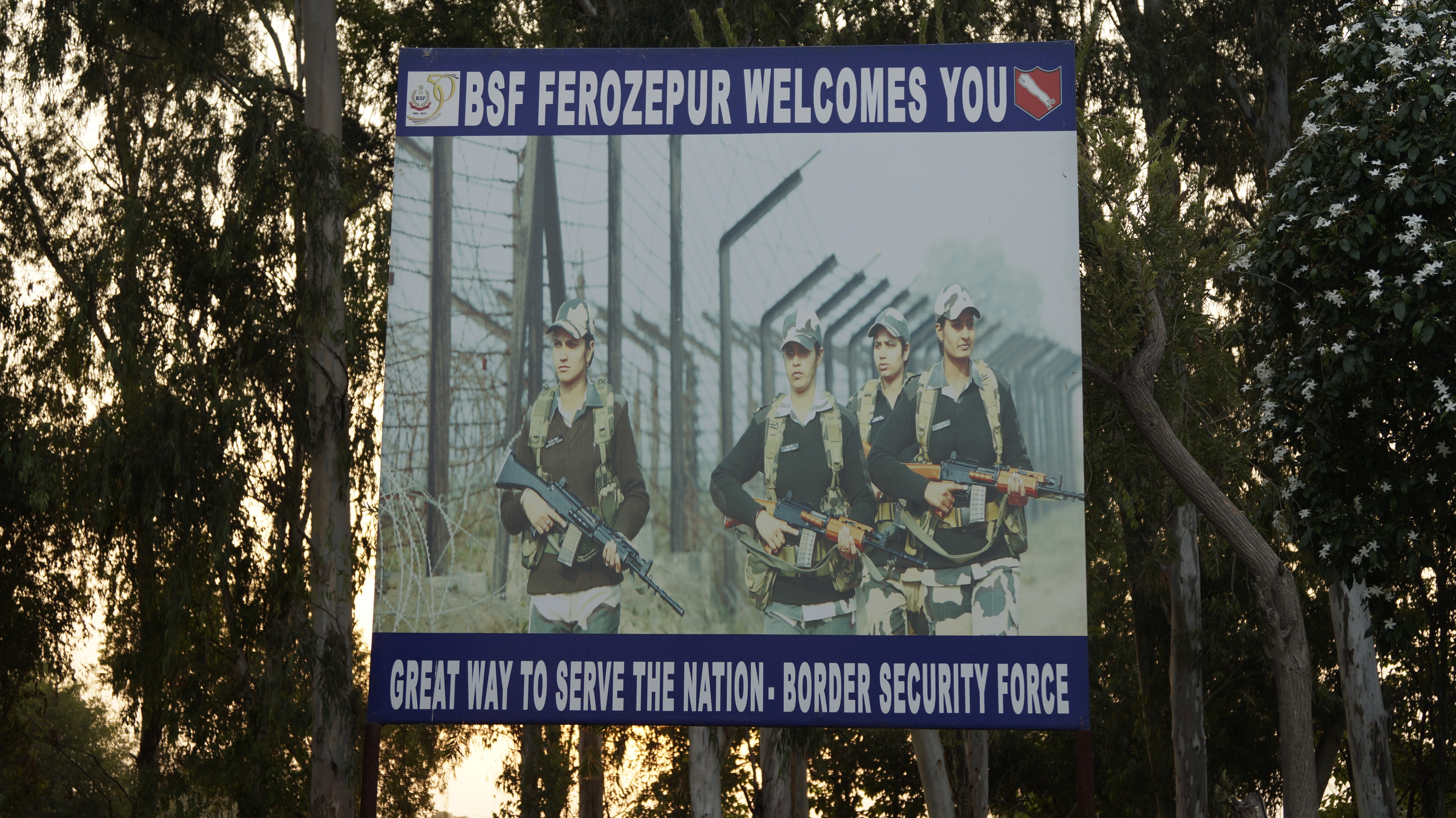

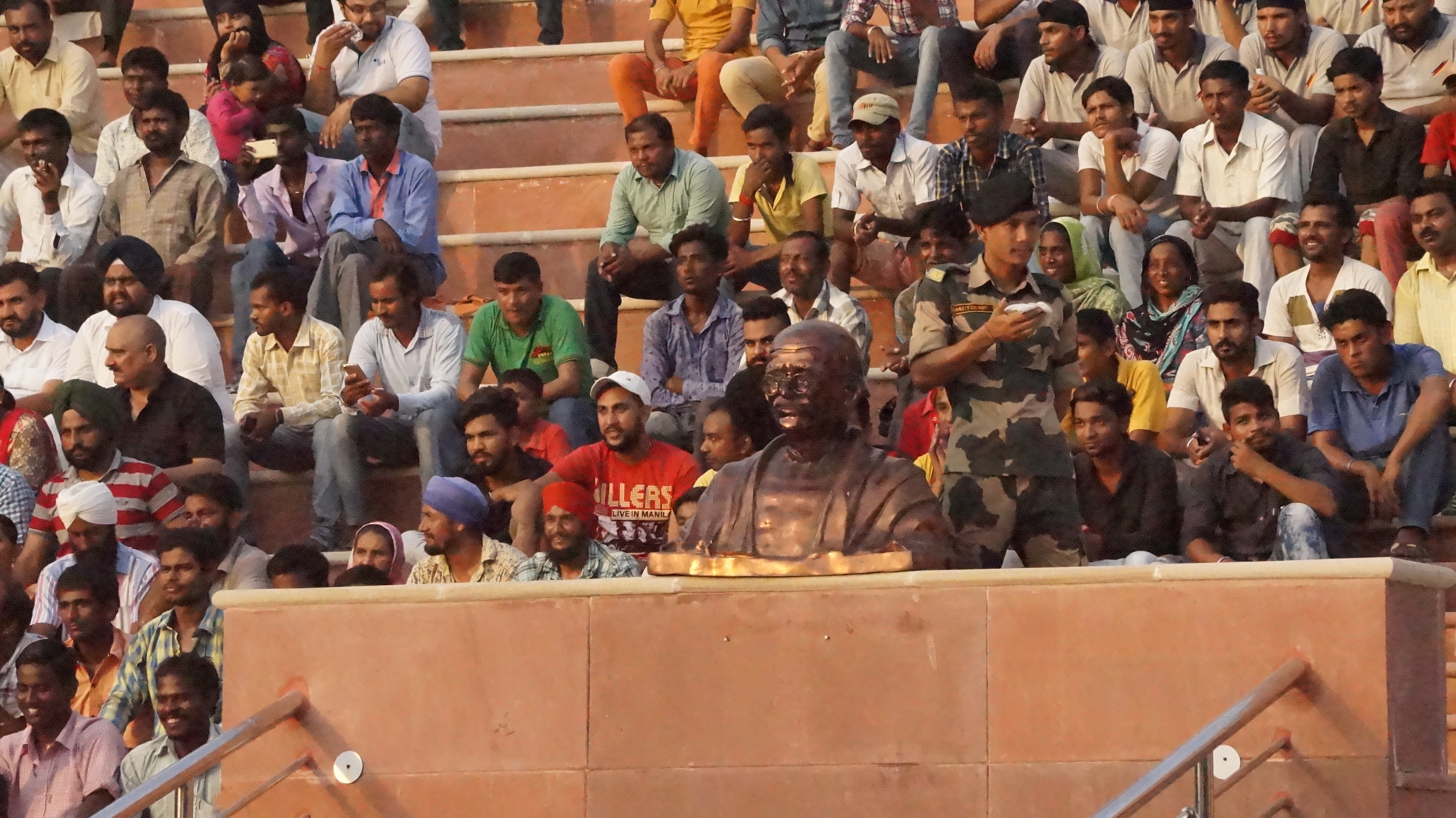

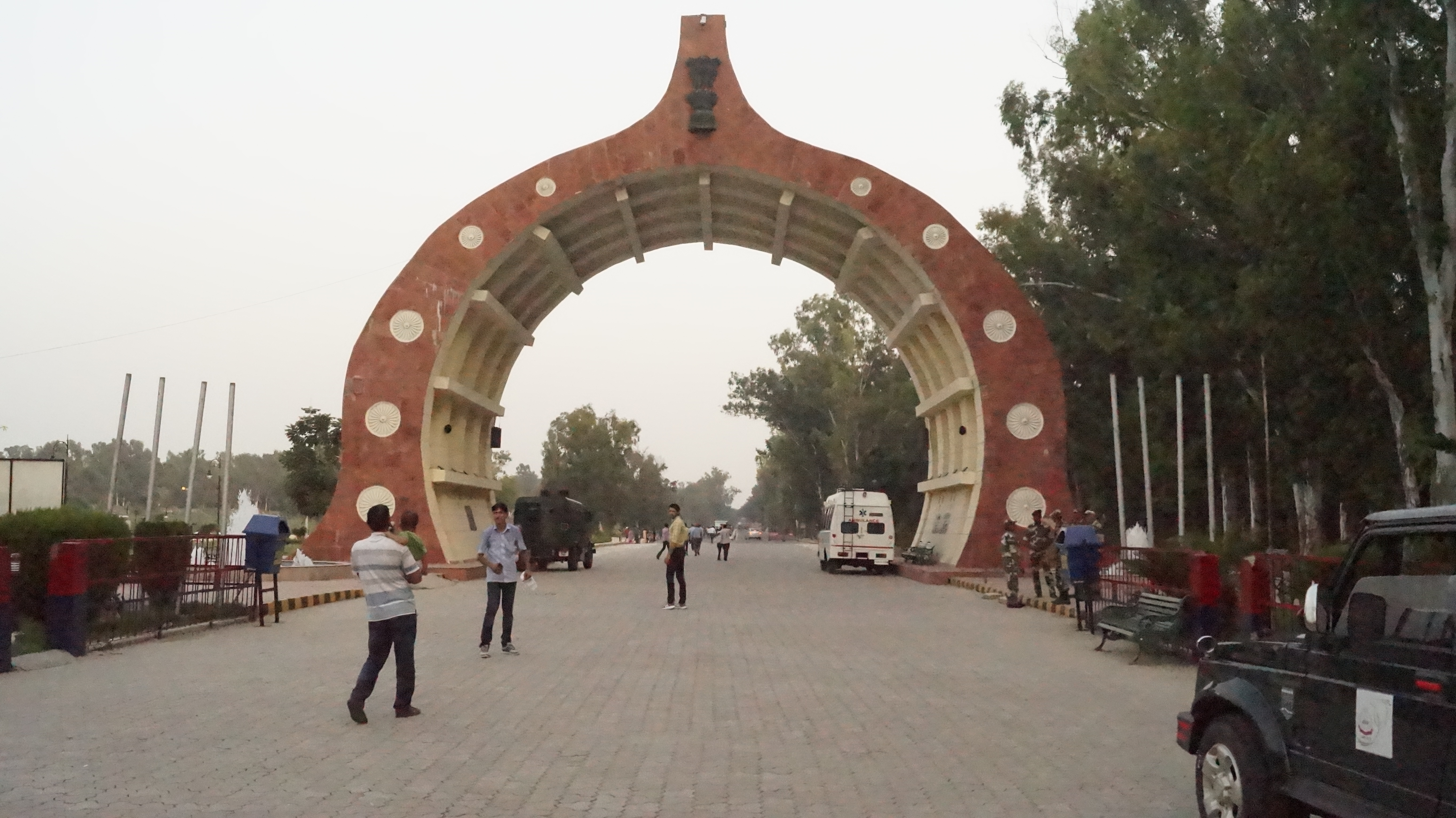

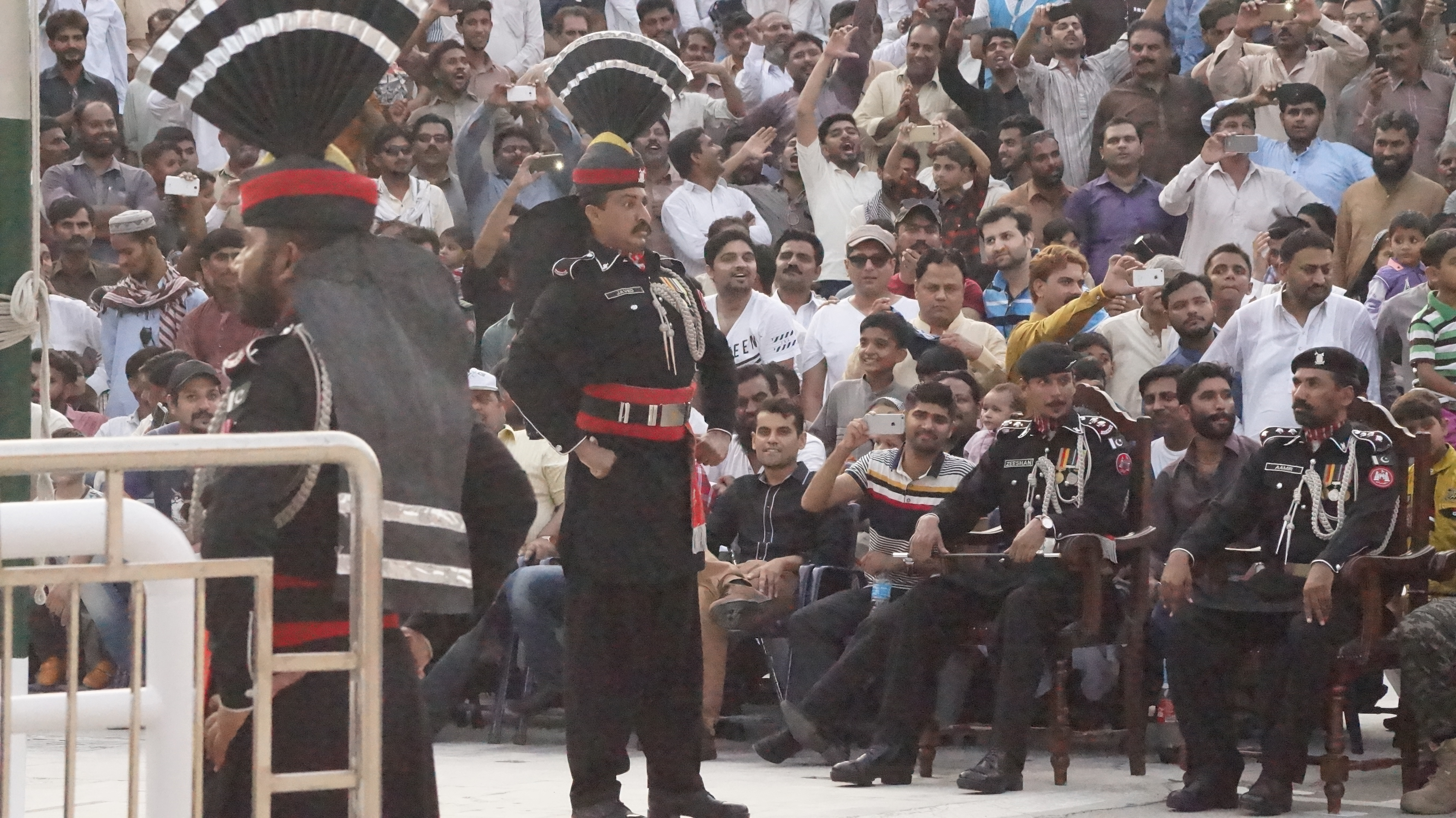

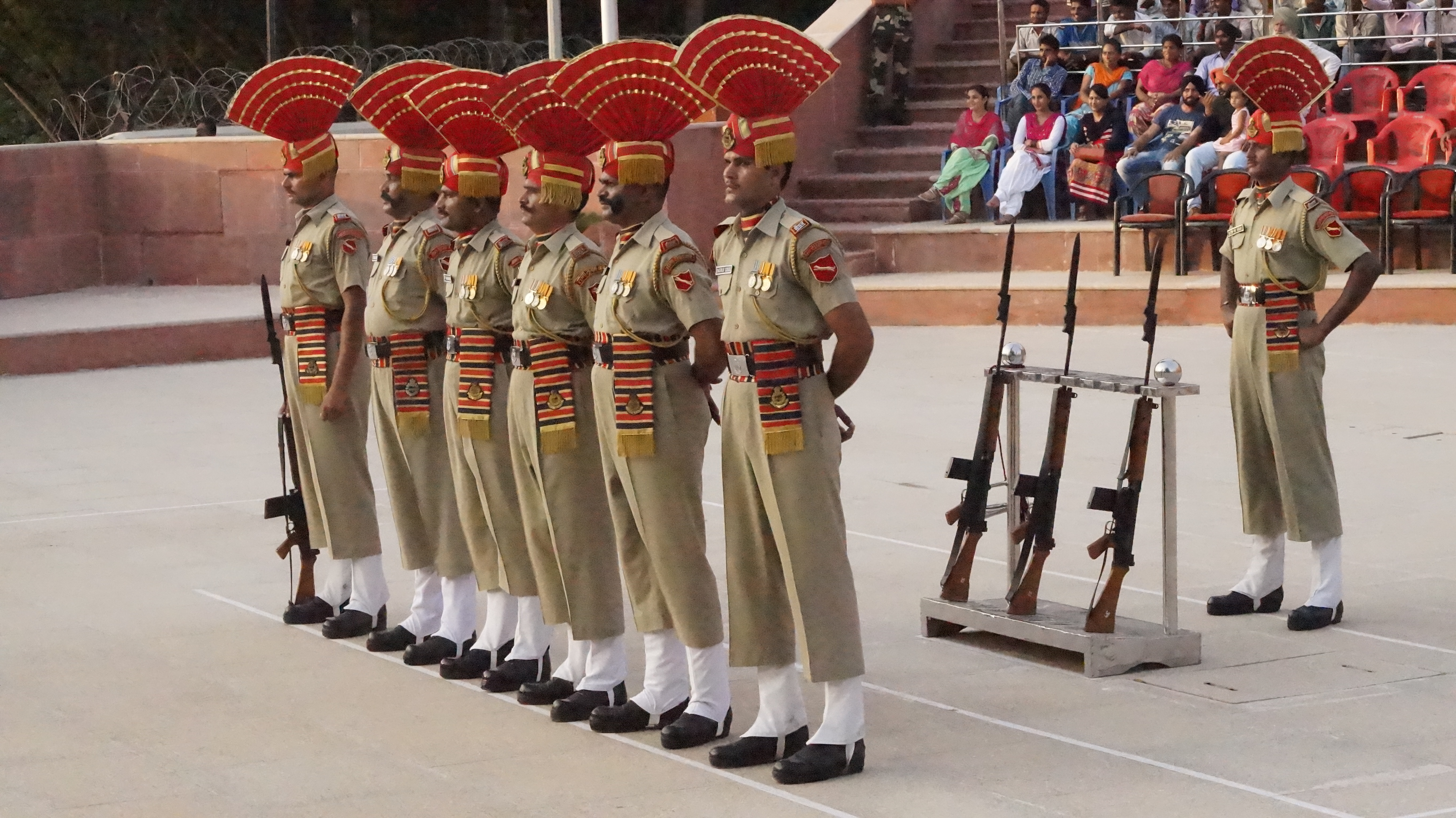

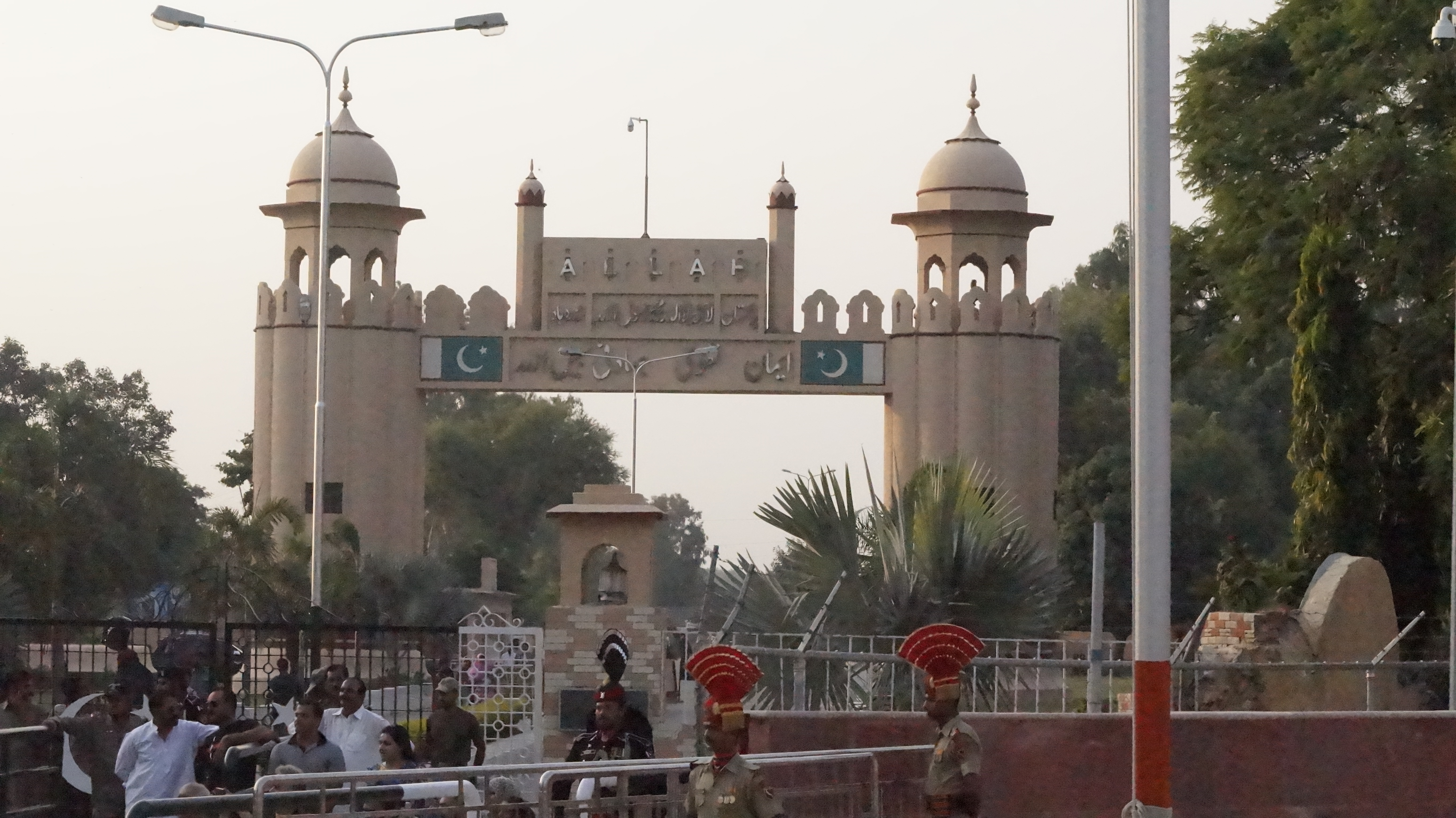

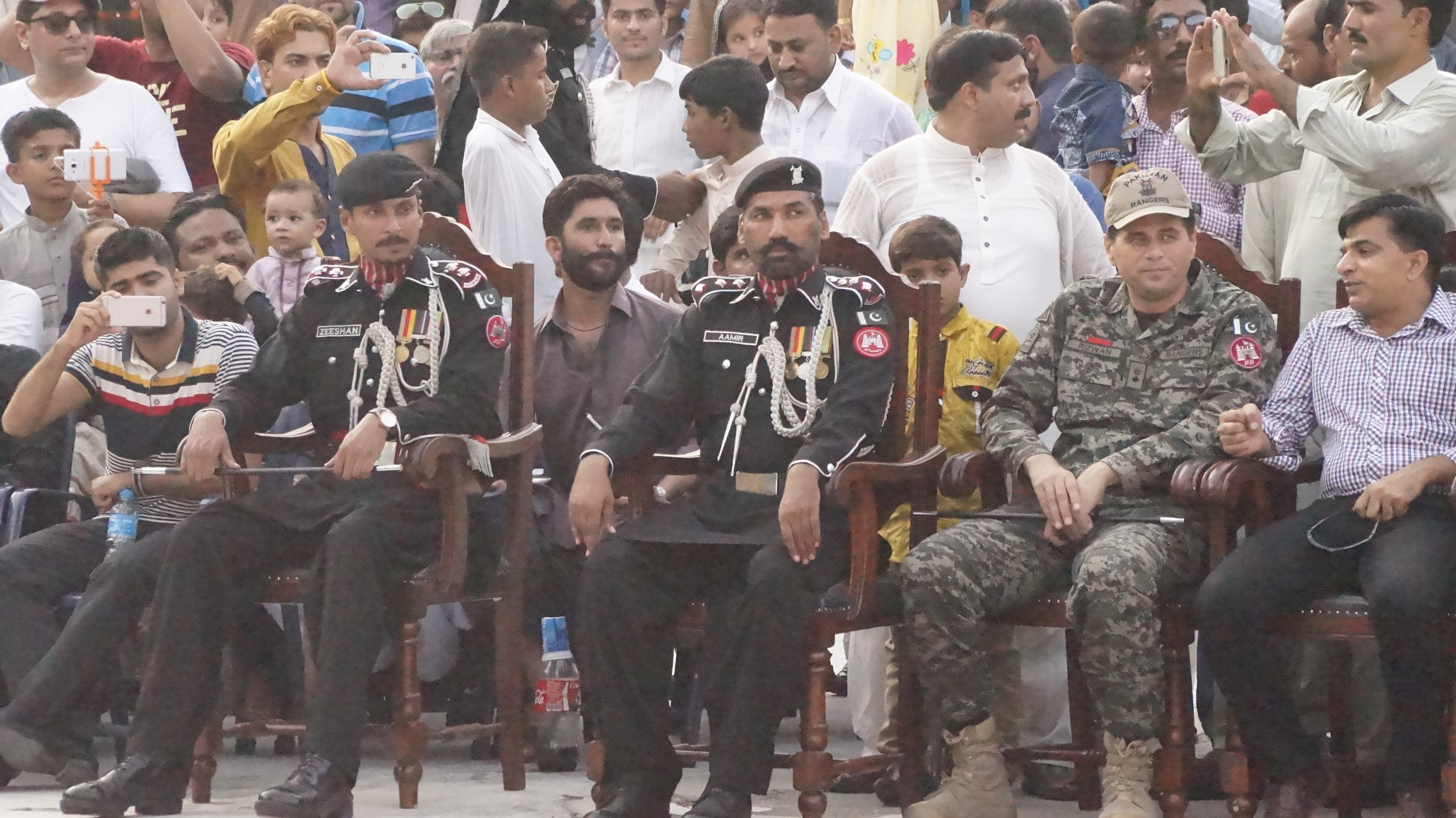

== See also ==
- Attari
- Munabao
- India-Pakistan battles
