= Sukhdev Thapar =

Indian revolutionary (1907–1931)

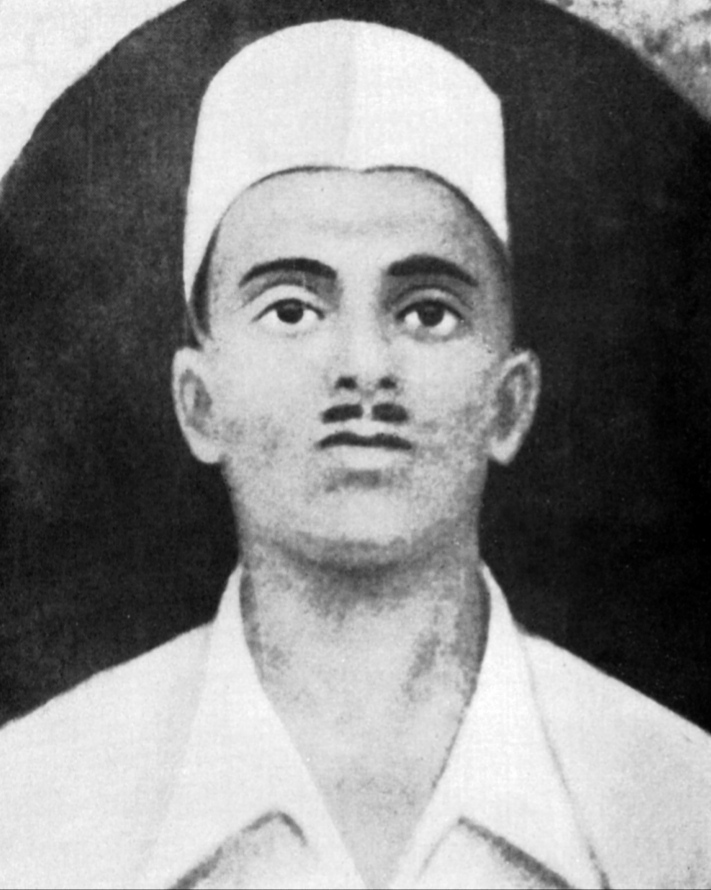
- Thapar in 1929
- Born: 15 May 1907; Ludhiana, Punjab, British India (present-day Punjab, India)
- Died: 23 March 1931 (aged 23); Lahore Central Jail, Punjab, British India (present-day Punjab, Pakistan)
- Cause of death: Execution by hanging
- Occupation: Armed revolutionary
- Organization(s): HSRA; Naujawan Bharat Sabha
- Known for: Contribution in freedom struggle
- Movement: Indian Independence movement

Sukhdev Thapar (15 May 1907 – 23 March 1931) was an Indian freedom fighter who fought against the British government for Indian independence. He was a member of the Hindustan Socialist Republican Association (HSRA), and was executed along with Shivaram Rajguru and Bhagat Singh on 23 March 1931.

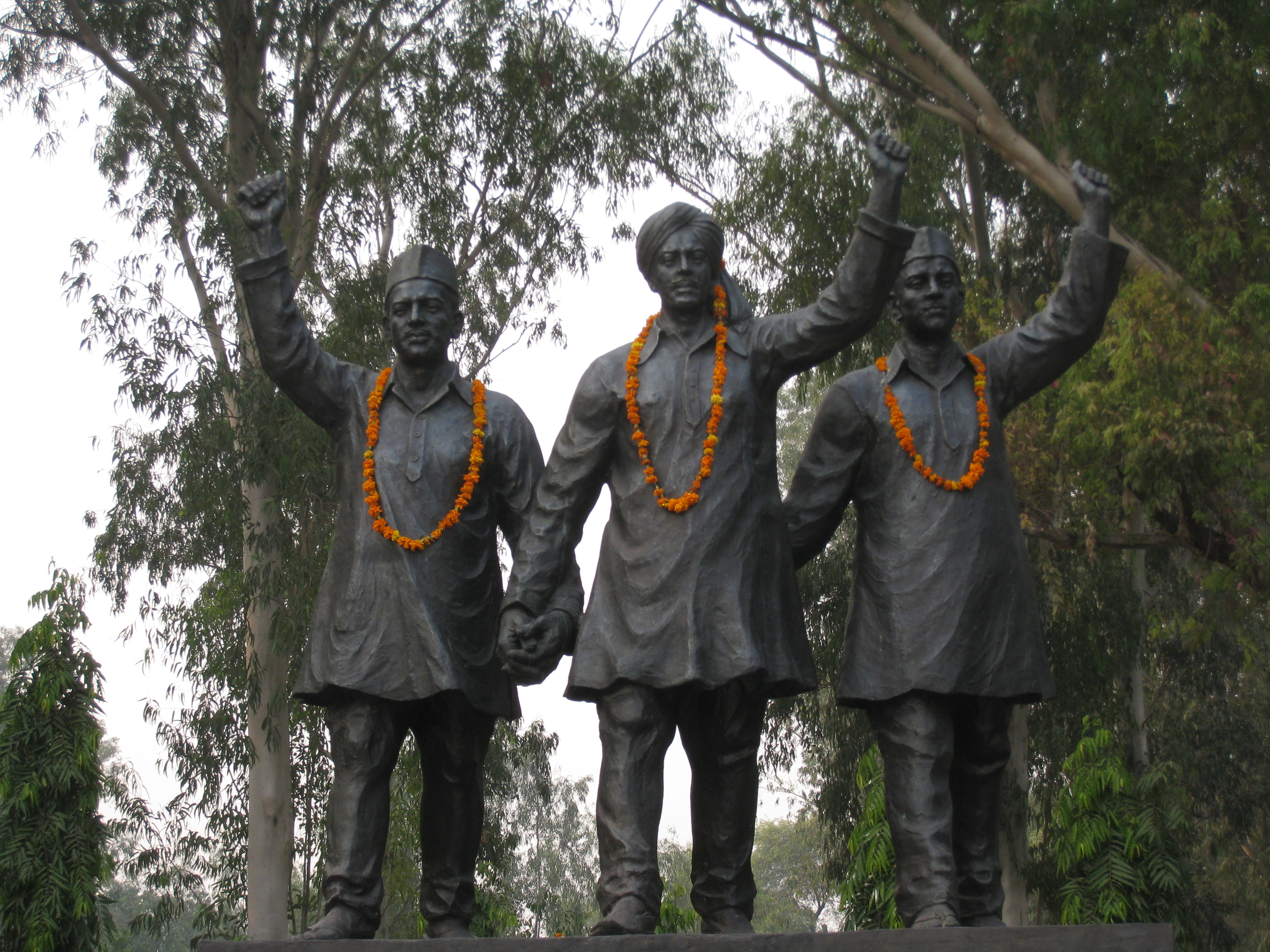
Statues of Bhagat Singh, Rajguru and Sukhdev at Hussainiwala, near the India–Pakistan Border.

== Early life of Sukhdev Thapar ==
Sukhdev Thapar was born in Naughara area of Old Ludhiana, Punjab, British Raj on 15 May 1907 to Ramlal Thapar and Ralli Devi. His father died three months before his birth and his mother died when he was young. He belonged to a Punjabi Khatri community and was brought up by his uncle Lala Achintram after the death of his father.

After completing his early education at Lyallpur, Sukhdev attended Arya High School. He passed his High School examination in 1922, and then went to Lahore for further studies at National College. It’s also at National College where he first met Bhagat Singh.

== Revolutionary activities ==
=== Hindustan Socialist Republican Association ===
Sukhdev Thapar was a member of the Hindustan Socialist Republican Association and the Naujawan Bharat Sabha. He also initiated revolutionary movements in Punjab and other regions of northern India. He was the chief of the Punjab unit of the HSRA and was instrumental in making decisions.

Sukhdev took part in a number of revolutionary events, including a prison hunger strike in 1929. He is widely known for his assaults in the Lahore Conspiracy Case (1929–1930). He is well known for his role in the assassination of Assistant Superintendent of Police John P. Saunders on 17 December 1928, by Bhagat Singh and Shivaram Rajguru, the assassination carried out in retaliation for the senior leader Lala Lajpat Rai's horrific death.

=== Lahore Conspiracy Case ===
Sukhdev was the main suspect in the 1929 Lahore Conspiracy Case, which was officially titled "Crown versus Sukhdev and others." The case's first information report (FIR), submitted in April 1929 by Hamilton Harding, Senior Superintendent of Police, in the court of R.S. Pandit, Special Magistrate, lists Sukhdev as accused number one. It describes him as Swami alias peasant, son of Ram Lal, Thapar Khatri caste. Sukhdev and his companions were detained, found guilty, and given a death sentence following the bombings of the Central Assembly Hall in New Delhi on 8 April 1929.

Thapar, Bhagat Singh, and Shivaram Rajguru were all hanged on 23 March 1931, in Lahore Central Jail. Their remains were surreptitiously burned on the banks of the Sutlej River.

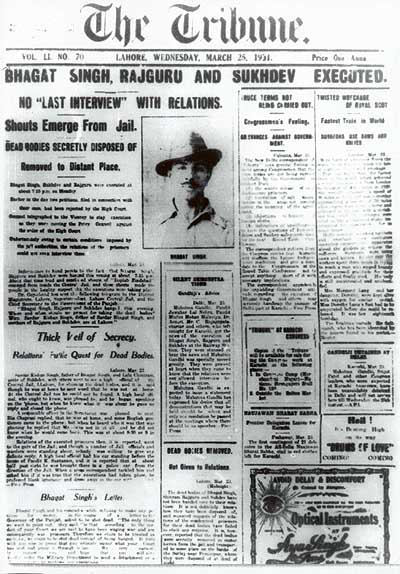
Front page of The Tribune announcing the executions

=== Reactions to the executions ===
The executions were highly publicised in the news, especially because they occurred on the day of the Indian National Congress's annual convention in Karachi. According to the New York Times:

A reign of terror in the city of Kanpur in the United Provinces and an attack on Mahatma Gandhi by a youth outside Karachi were among the answers of the Indian extremists today to the hanging of Bhagat Singh and two fellow assassins.

In an editorial for his daily Janata, B. R. Ambedkar blamed the British government for the killings, despite widespread popular sympathy for the revolutionaries. He believed that the decision to execute the trio was not made in the spirit of justice, but rather out of fear of a backlash from the Conservative Party and a need to please public opinion in England.

Conservatives saw the Gandhi-Irwin Pact, signed just weeks before the execution, as undermining the authority of the British Empire. If the British government or the Viceroy of India had changed the death sentences of the trio convicted of murdering a British police officer in such a situation, it would have given conservatives more ammunition to criticize the already weak British government in Parliament.

== Legacy ==
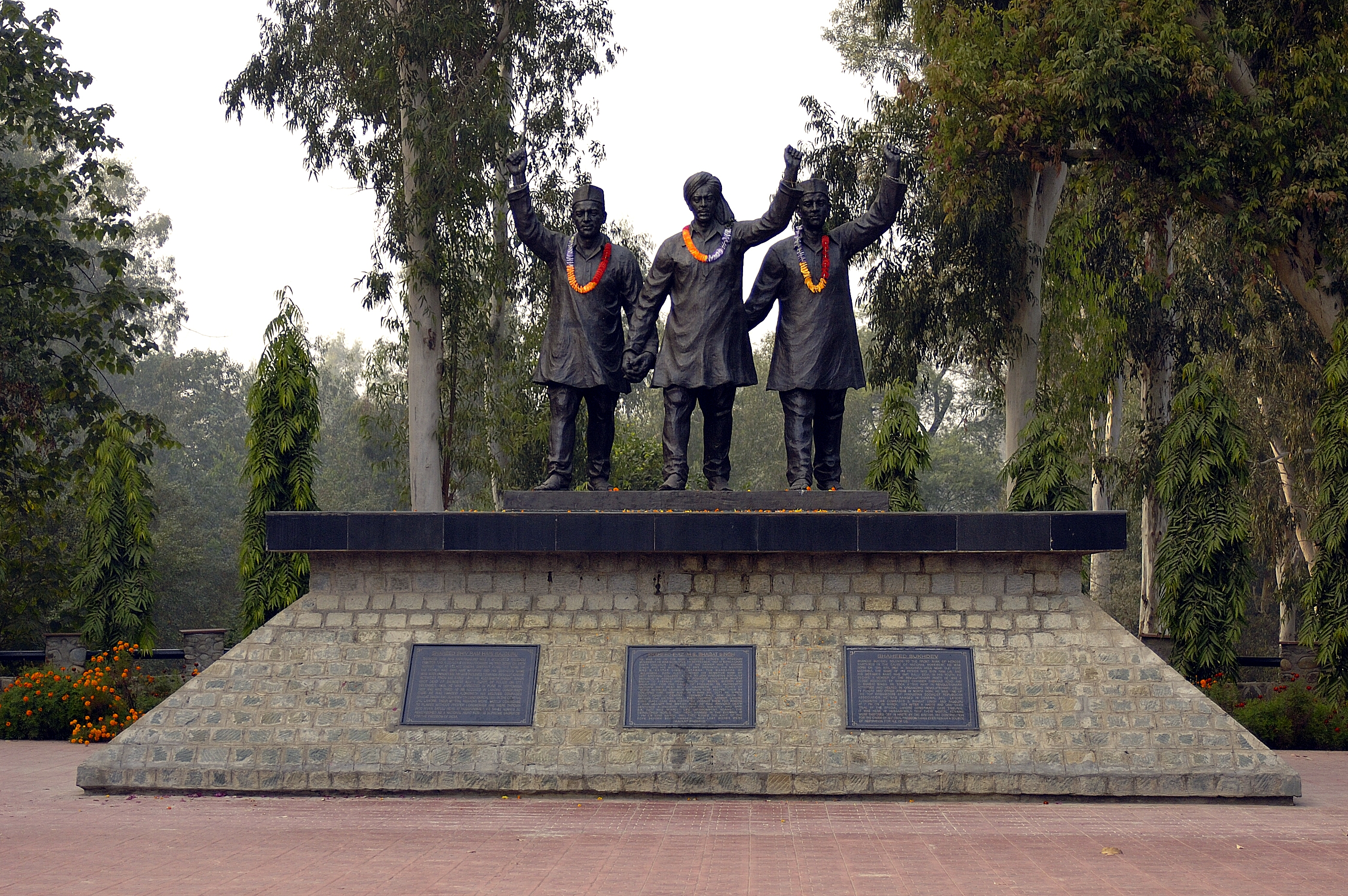
National Martyrs Memorial for Sukhdev, Bhagat Singh and Rajguru

National Martyrs Memorial is located at Hussainiwala, where Sukhdev, along with Bhagat Singh and Rajguru, were cremated. A Martyrs' Day (Shaheed Diwas) is observed on 23 March in their memory. Tributes and homage are paid at the memorial.

Shaheed Sukhdev College of Business Studies, a constituent college of the University of Delhi, is named in memory of Sukhdev. It was established in August 1987.

Amar Shaheed Sukhdev Thapar Inter-State Bus Terminal is the main bus stand of Ludhiana city, the birthplace of Sukhdev.

== See also ==
- Ashfaqulla Khan
- Kakori Train Robbery
- Naujawan Bharat Sabha
- Revolutionary movement for Indian independence
