= Bhagat Singh, Sukhdev, Rajguru =

Indian anti-colonial nationalists

Bhagat Singh, Sukhdev, Rajguru (Bhagat Singh, Sukhdev Thapar, and Shivaram Rajguru,) were three prominent Indian revolutionary freedom fighters who were hanged by the British on March 23, 1931, for their role in the Lahore Conspiracy Case.

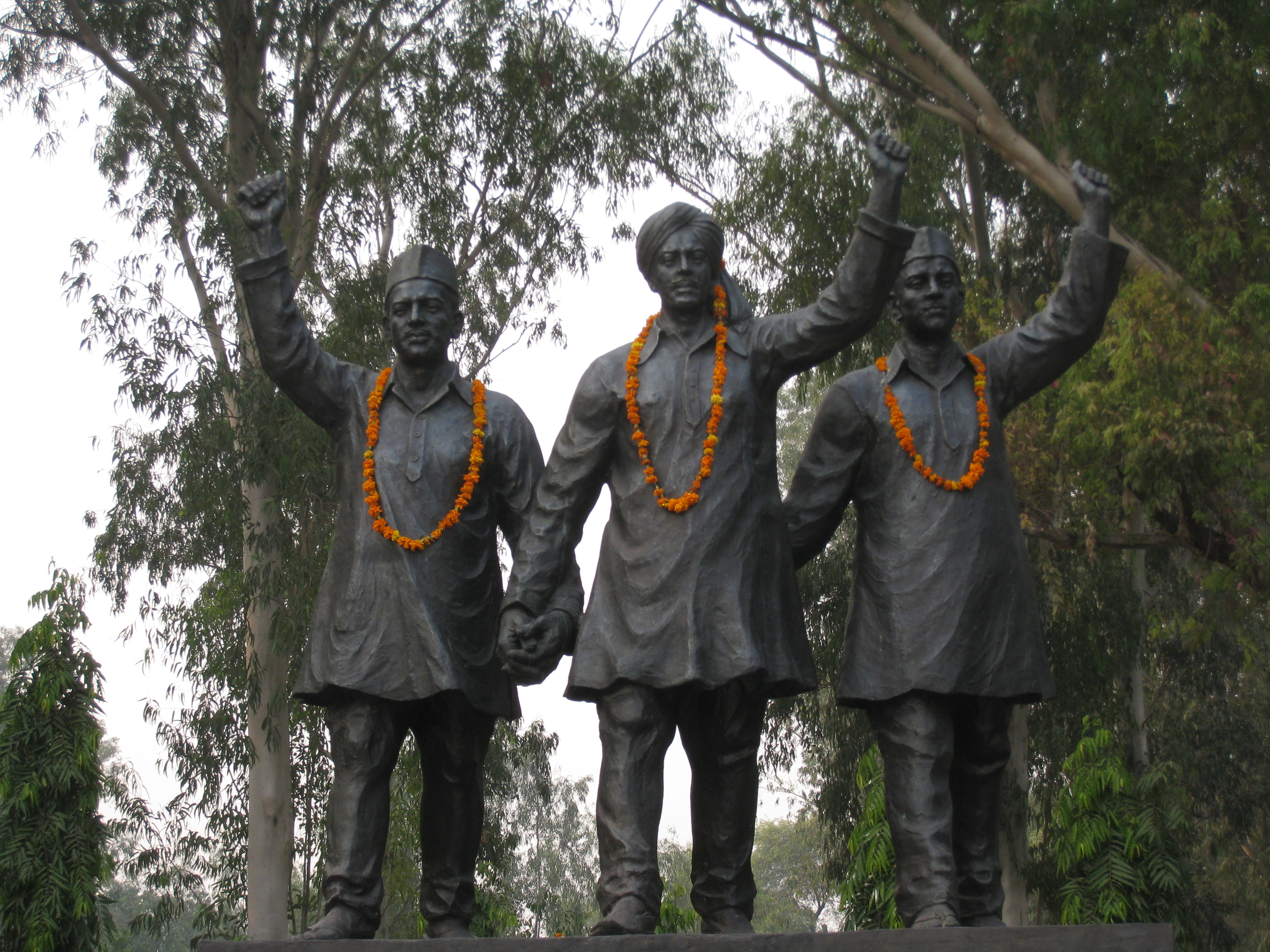
Statues of Bhagat Singh, Rajguru and Sukhdev at the India–Pakistan Border, near Hussainiwala

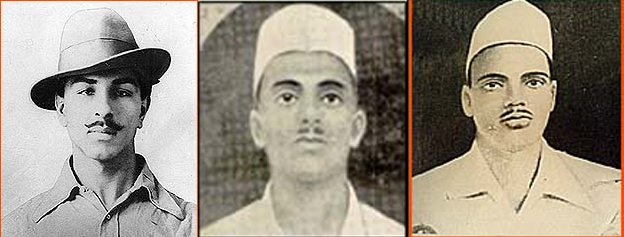
Bhagat Singh (left), Sukhdev (center), and Rajguru

They were executed for their involvement in the assassination of British police officer John Saunders, an act of revenge for the death of Lala Lajpat Rai. The day of their martyrdom, March 23, is observed as Shaheed Diwas (Martyrs' Day) in India to honor their sacrifice for the country's freedom.

== Trio Events ==
=== Lahore Conspiracy Case ===
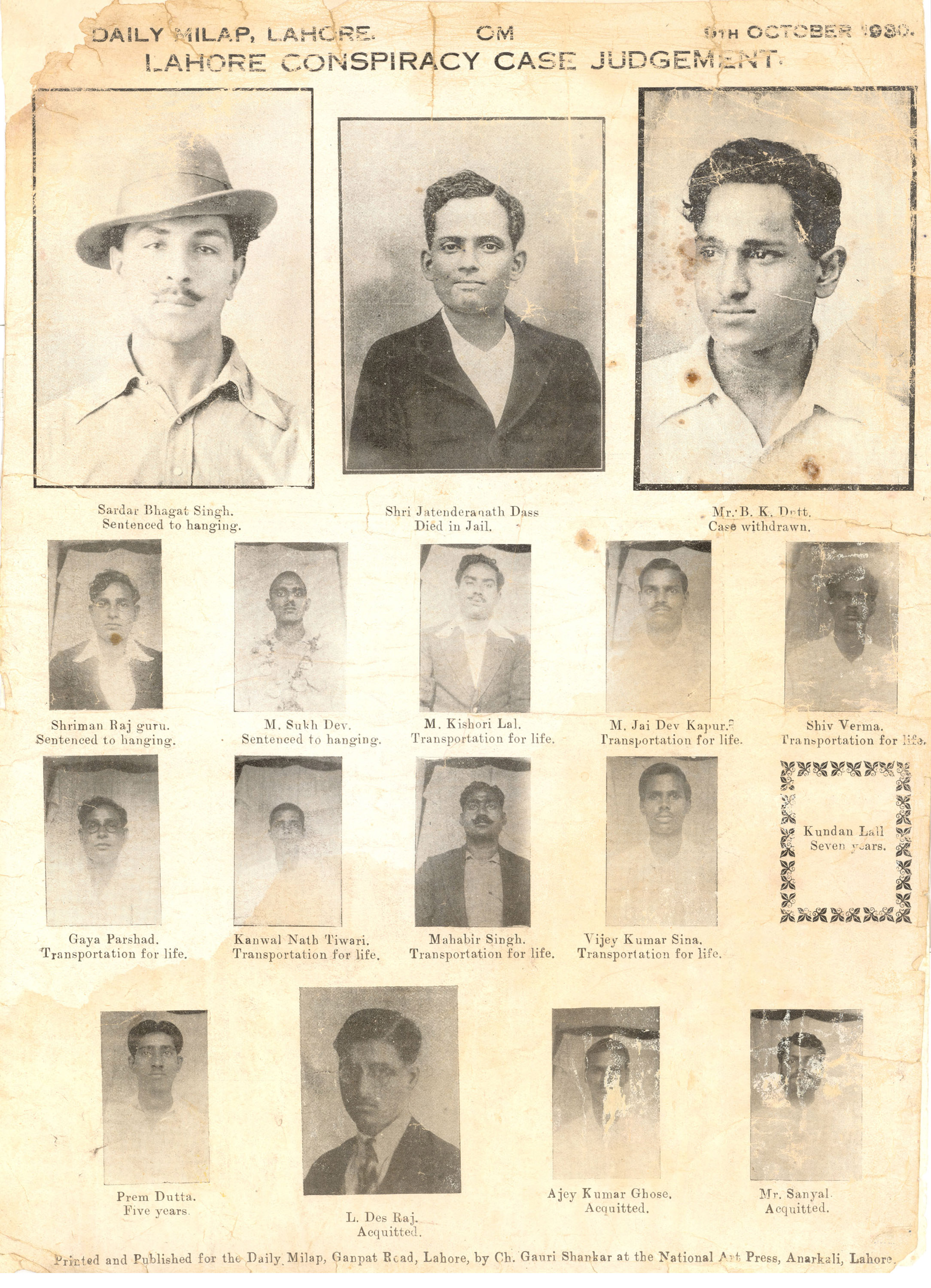
Lahore conspiracy case poster 9 October 1930

The trio was tried and sentenced to death in the Lahore Conspiracy Case.

=== Saunders' Assassination ===
They were involved in the shooting of British police officer John Saunders in 1928 to avenge the death of Lala Lajpat Rai.

== 23 March Martyrs' Day ==
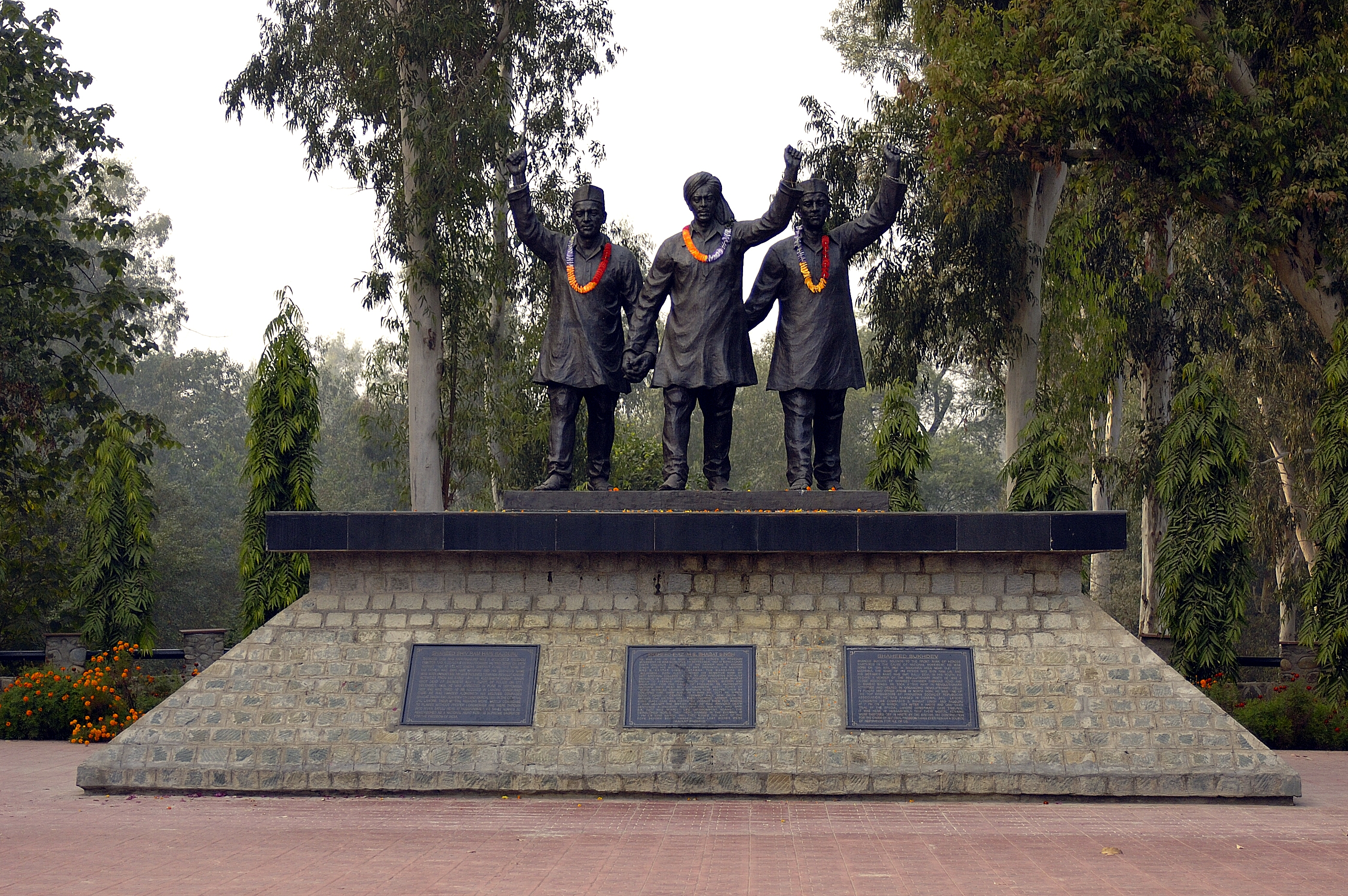
National Martyrs Memorial for Sukhdev, Bhagat Singh and Rajguru

The anniversary of the deaths of Bhagat Singh, Sukhdev Thapar and Shivaram Rajguru on 23 March 1931, in Lahore, is recognised as a Martyrs' Day.

== The Hussainiwala National Martyrs Memorial ==
The Hussainiwala National Martyrs Memorial is a powerful tribute to Indian freedom fighters Bhagat Singh, Sukhdev Thapar, and Shivaram Rajguru, located in the village of Hussainiwala in Punjab.

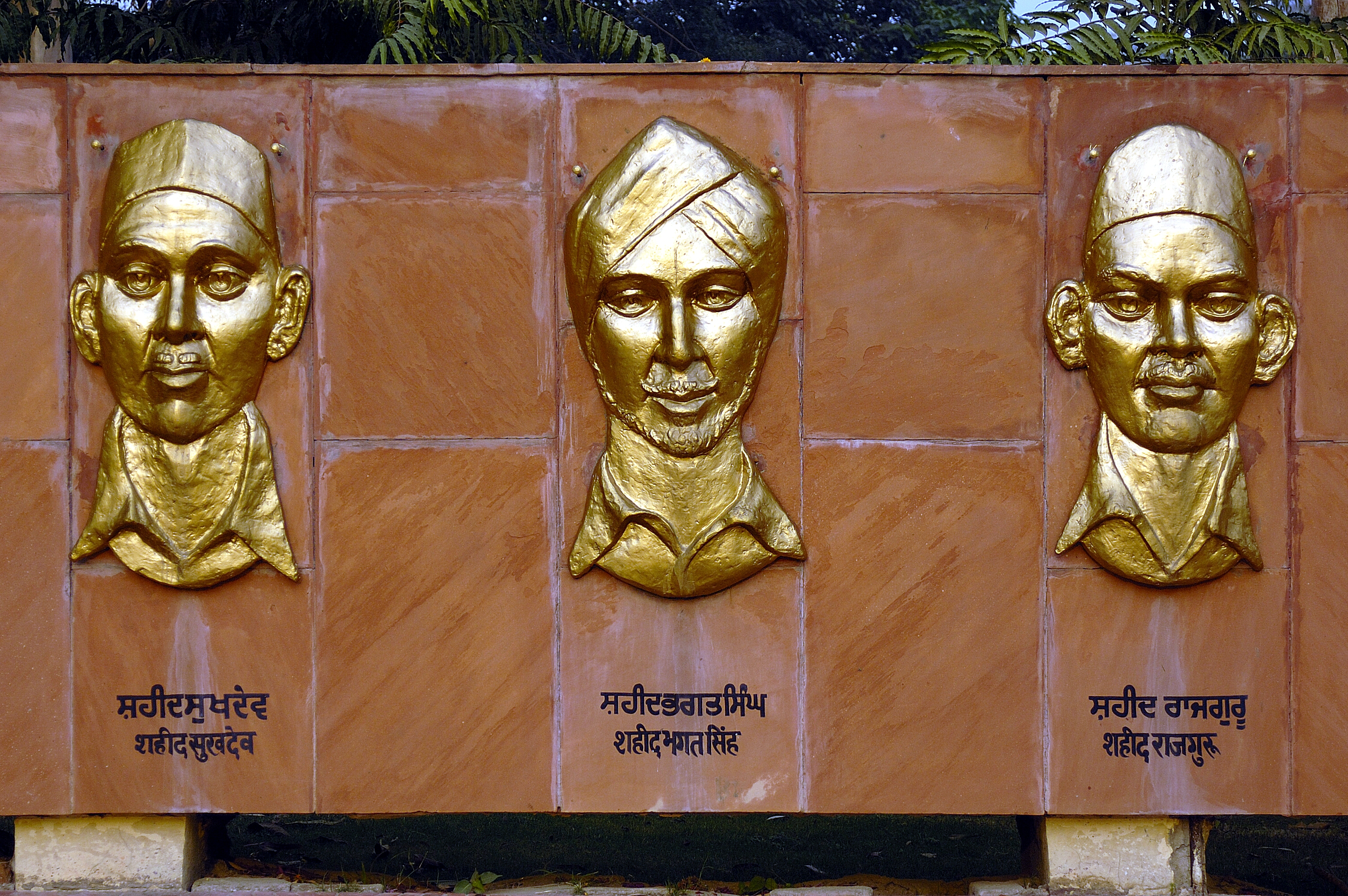
Statues of Bhagat Singh, Rajguru and Sukhdev

The memorial stands on the banks of the Sutlej River, marking the spot where the three revolutionaries were secretly and unceremoniously cremated by British authorities after their execution on March 23, 1931.

== Films and television ==
23rd March 1931: Shaheed and The Legend of Bhagat Singh are two 2002 films in which Singh was portrayed by Bobby Deol and Ajay Devgn respectively.

== See also ==
- Category:Indian revolutionaries
