= Shivaram Rajguru =

Indian anti-colonial revolutionary and independence activist (1908–1931)

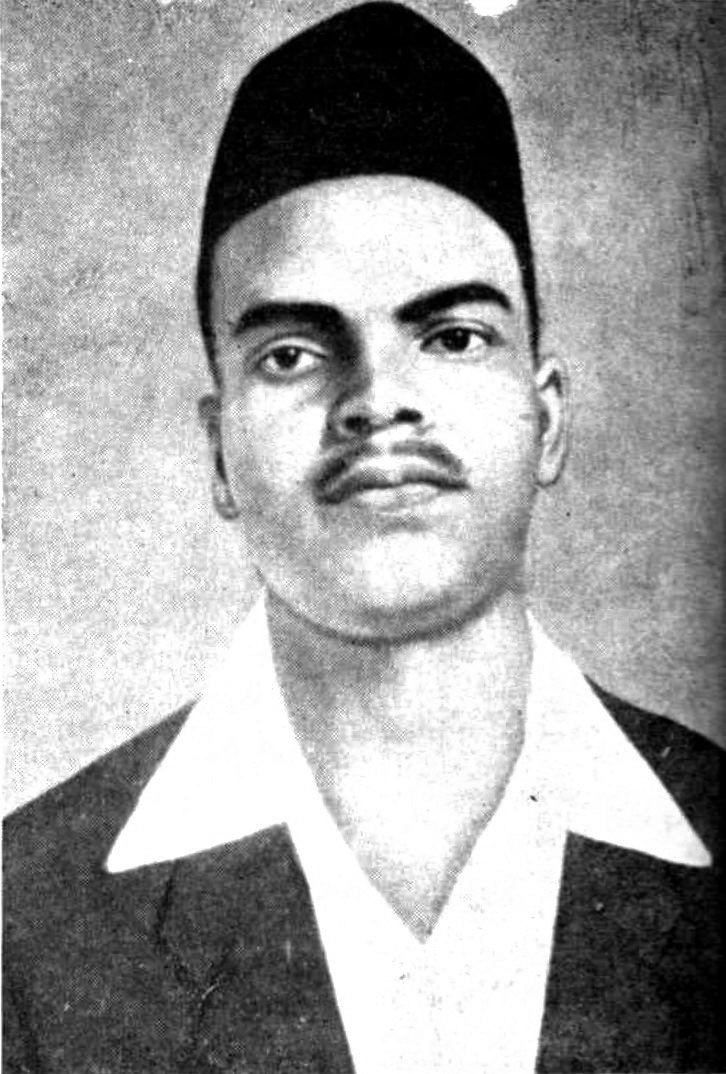
- Born: Shivaram Hari Rajguru; 24 August 1908; Khed, Bombay Presidency, British India (present-day Rajgurunagar, Maharashtra, India)
- Died: 23 March 1931 (aged 22); Lahore Central Jail, Punjab, British India (present-day Punjab, Pakistan)
- Occupation: Revolutionary
- Organization: HSRA (Hindustan Socialist Republican Organisation)
- Movement: Indian Independence movement
- Criminal charges: Murder of John P. Saunders and Chanan Singh
- Criminal penalty: Capital punishment
- Criminal status: Executed by hanging

Shivaram Hari Rajguru (24 August 1908 – 23 March 1931) was an Indian anti-colonial revolutionary and independence activist. He is best known for his involvement in the 1928 assassination of a British police officer named John P. Saunders. He was an active member of the Hindustan Socialist Republican Association (HSRA) and on 23 March 1931, he was hanged by the British government along with his associates Bhagat Singh and Sukhdev Thapar.

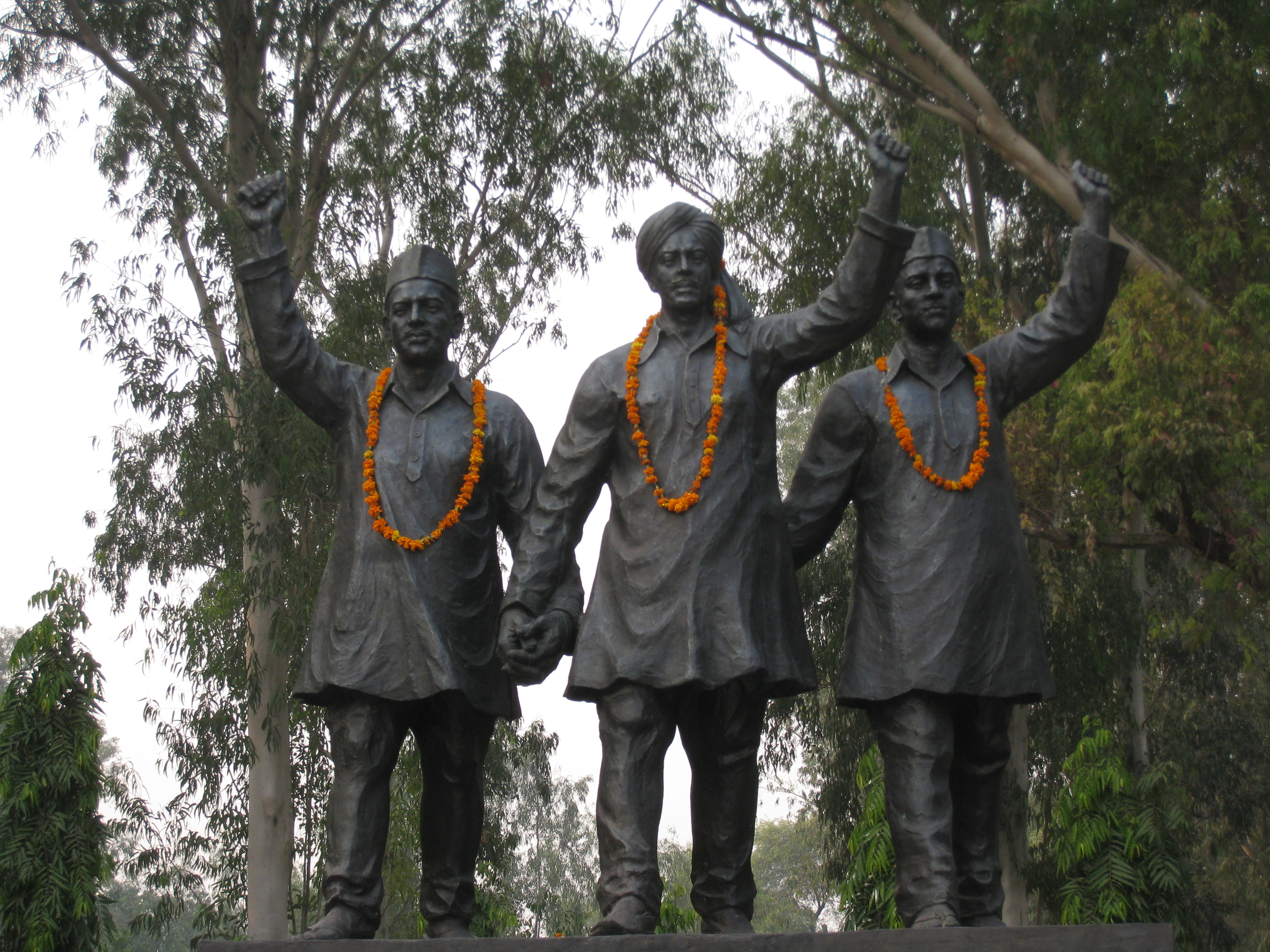
Statues of Bhagat Singh, Rajguru and Sukhdev at the India–Pakistan Border, near Hussainiwala

== Early life ==
Rajguru was born on 24 August 1908 at Khed to Parvati Devi and Harinarayan Rajguru in a Marathi Deshastha Brahmin family. Khed was located at the bank of river Bheema near Pune. His father died when he was only six years old and the responsibility of the family fell on his elder brother Dinkar. He received primary education at Khed and later studied in New English High School in Pune. He joined Seva Dal at a young age.

== Revolutionary activities ==
He was a member of the Hindustan Socialist Republican Association, who wanted India to be free from British Raj by any means possible.

He is remembered for his revolutionary activities, particularly for his involvement in the Kakori Conspiracy of 1925, where revolutionaries robbed a British train to fund their activities. Rajguru, along with other revolutionaries like Ram Prasad Bismil and Ashfaqulla Khan, played a significant role in this daring act. Rajguru became a colleague of Bhagat Singh & Sukhdev Thapar, and took part in the assassination of a British police officer, J. P. "John" Saunders, at Lahore on 17 December 1928. Their actions were to avenge the beating of Lala Lajpat Rai by the police while on a march protesting the Simon Commission; Lala Lajpat Rai died a month before the Saunders assassination.

== Legacy ==
Rajguru Wada is the ancestral house where Rajguru was born. Spread over 2,788 sq m of land, it is located on the banks of Bhima river on Pune-Nashik Road. It is being maintained as a memorial to Shivaram Rajguru. A local organization, the Hutatma Rajguru Smarak Samiti (HRSS), hoists the national flag here on Republic Day since 2004.

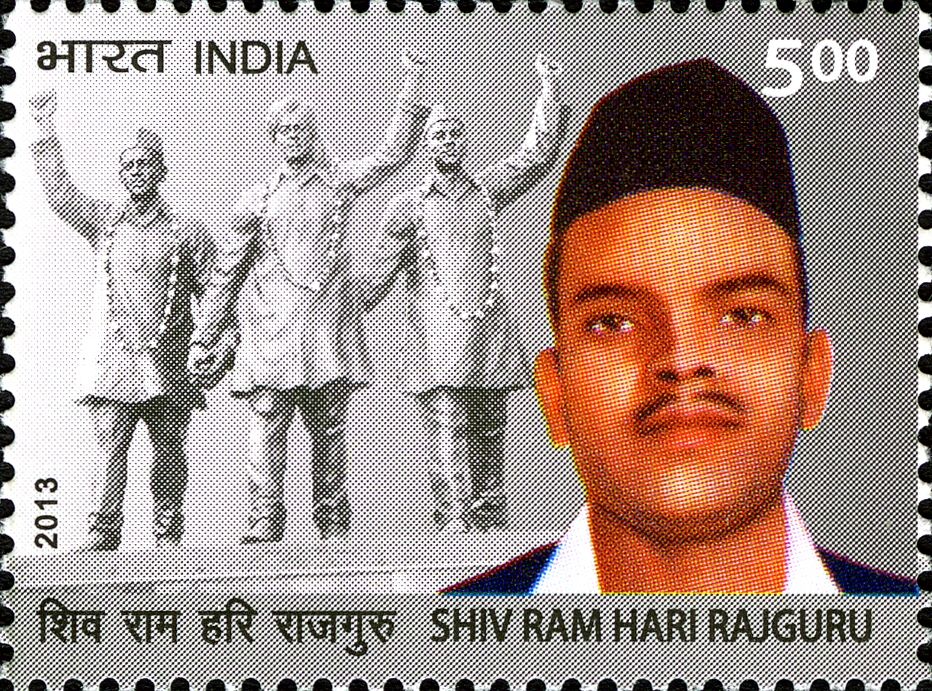
Shivaram Rajguru 2013 stamp of India

His birthplace of Khed was renamed as Rajgurunagar in his honour. Rajgurunagar is a census town in Khed tehsil of Pune district in state of Maharashtra.

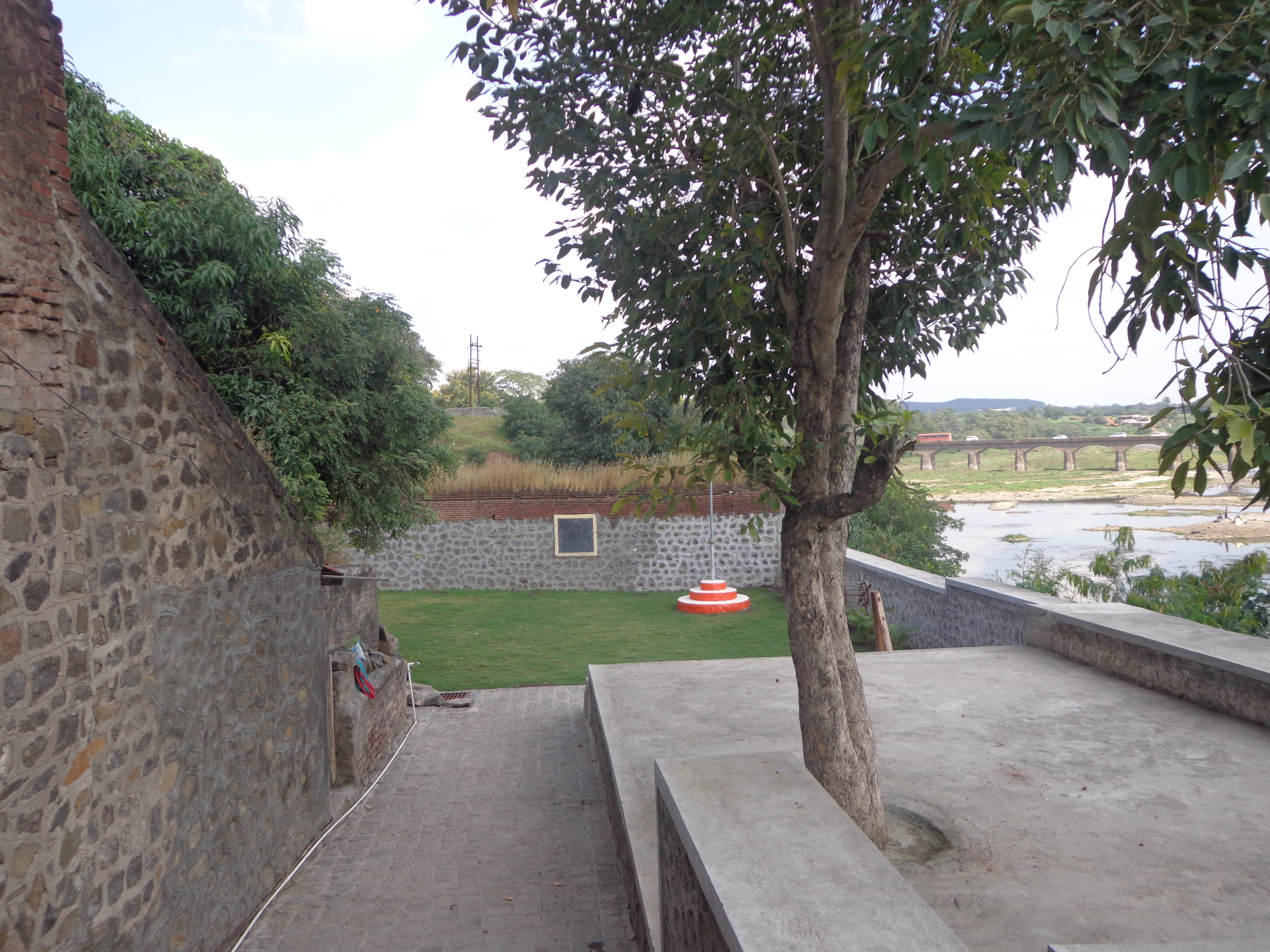
Rajguru Wada

Shaheed Rajguru College of Applied Sciences for Women is located in Vasundhara Enclave, Delhi, and is a constituent college of Delhi University.

== See also ==
- Ashfaqulla Khan
- Kakori Train Robbery
- Thakur Roshan Singh
- Batukeshwar Dutt
