= Punian =

- Village
- Location in Punjab, India Punian (India)
- Coordinates: 31.0885158°N 75.2377707°E
- Country: India
- State: Punjab
- District: Jalandhar
- Tehsil: Shahkot

Government
  - Type: Panchayat raj
  - Body: Gram panchayat
- Elevation: 240 m (790 ft)

Population (2011)
  - Total: 2,286
- Sex ratio 1164/1122 ♂/♀

Languages
  - Official: Punjabi
- Time zone: UTC+5:30 (IST)
- PIN: 144702
- ISO 3166 code: IN-PB
- Vehicle registration: PB- 08
- Website: jalandhar.nic.in

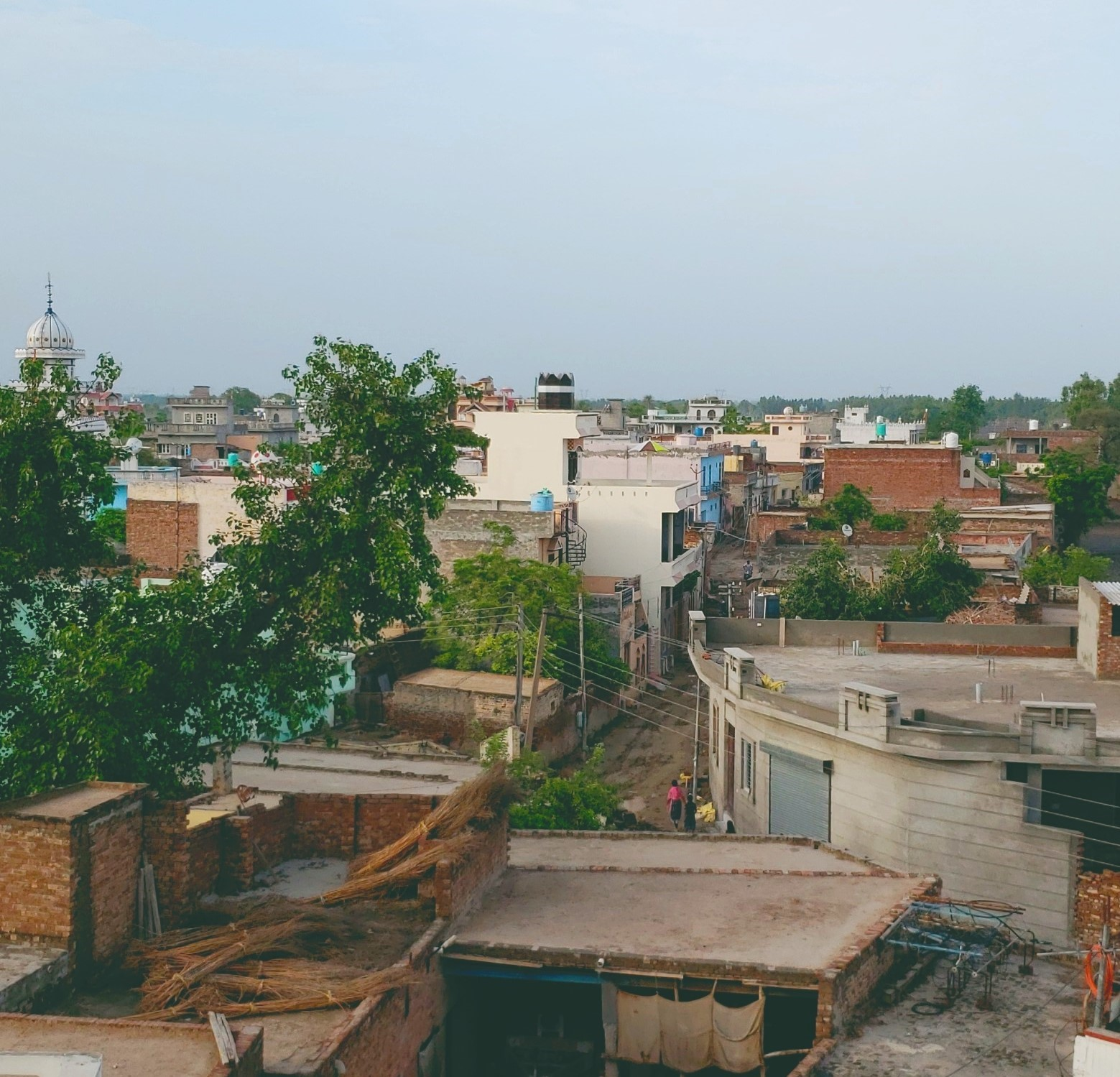
View of Village Punian in July 2019

Punian or Poonian is a village in Shahkot in Jalandhar district of the Indian state of Punjab. It is located 10 km (6.2 mi) from Shahkot, 28 km (17 mi) from Nakodar, 52 km (32 mi) from district headquarter Jalandhar and 185 km (115 mi) from Chandigarh.

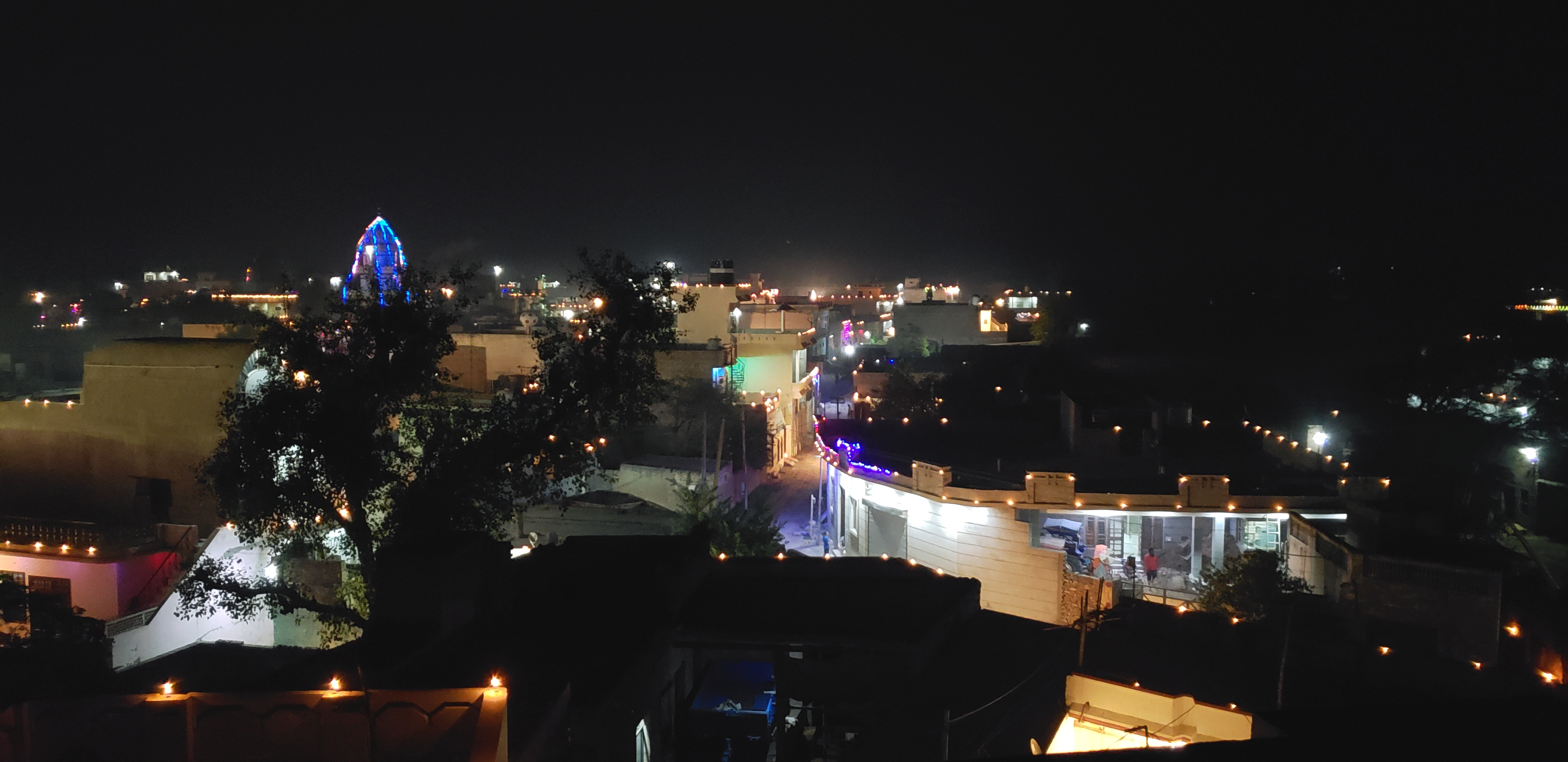
The Night View of Punian on Diwlai 2018

== Demographics ==
As of 2011, the village had a total population of 2286 including 1164 males and 1122 females according to Census India. The literacy rate is 70.16%, lower than state average of 75.84%. The population of children under age 6 is 207.

The village has Schedule Tribe and Schedule Caste populations of 591 and 207, respectively, or 34.90% of the total.

As of 2011, 753 people were engaged in work activities, including 645 males and 108 females. 711 workers described their work as main work.

== Education ==
Punian has one Government Senior Secondary School and one Government Primary School. The village has no college.

== Transport ==
Sindhar station is the nearest train station. The village is 90 km (56 mi) from the domestic airport in Ludhiana, while the nearest international airport is Sri Guru Ram Dass Jee International Airport which is 104 km (65 mi) away in Amritsar.

The village is well connected by bus of Punjab Roadways and a private company that connects the village with Shahkot, Lohian Khas and Sultanpur Lodhi.
