= Sindhar =

Sindhar(ਸਿੰਧੜ)
- Village
- Location in Punjab, India Sindhar(ਸਿੰਧੜ) (India)
- Coordinates: 31.1118365°N 75.2406407°E
- Country: India
- State: Punjab
- District: Jalandhar
- Tehsil: Nakodar

Government
  - Type: Panchayat raj
  - Body: Gram panchayat
- Elevation: 240 m (790 ft)

Population (2011)
  - Total: 1,486
- Sex ratio 740/746 ♂/♀

Languages
  - Official: Punjabi
- Time zone: UTC+5:30 (IST)
- ISO 3166 code: IN-PB
- Vehicle registration: PB- 08
- Website: jalandhar.nic.in

Sindhar is a village in Nakodar in Jalandhar district of Punjab State, India. It is located 19 kilometres (12 mi) from Nakodar, 27 kilometres (17 mi) from Kapurthala, 46 kilometres (29 mi) from district headquarter Jalandhar and 182 kilometres (113 mi) from state capital Chandigarh. The village is administrated by a sarpanch who is an elected representative of village as per Panchayati raj (India).

== Demography ==
As of 2011, the village has a total number of 296 houses and a population of 1486 of which include 740 are males while 746 are females according to the report published by Census India in 2011. The literacy rate of the village is 73.63%, lower than state average of 75.84%. The population of children under the age of 6 years is 174 which is 11.71% of total population of the village, and child sex ratio is approximately 832 lower than the state average of 846.

Most of the people are from Schedule Caste which consists 33.38% of total population in the village. The town does not have any Schedule Tribe population so far.

As per census 2011, 550 people were engaged in work activities out of the total population of the village which includes 440 males and 110 females. According to census survey report 2011, 88.55% workers describe their work as main work and 11.45% workers are involved in marginal activity providing livelihood for less than 6 months.

== Transport ==
Sindhar railway station is the village train station. The village is 88 kilometres (55 mi) away from domestic airport in Ludhiana and the nearest international airport is located in Chandigarh also Sri Guru Ram Dass Jee International Airport is the second nearest airport which is 102 kilometres (63 mi) away in Amritsar.

== See also ==
- List of villages in India
