= Dhandowal =

Coordinates: 31°04′40″N 75°21′05″E

Dhandowal is a small village in Jalandhar District, Punjab, India, one kilometer east of Shah Kot. Dhandowal is administered by the Gram Panchayat.

== Geography ==
Dhandowal is located at 31°4'40" N, 75°21'5" E., 41 km to the south of the district headquarters of Jalandhar, 1 km from Shahkot, and 167 km from State capital Chandigarh

Kotla Suraj Mal (1 km), Saidpur Jhiri (2 km), Laksian (3 km), Kanian Kalan (3 km), and Dabri (3 km) are the nearest villages to Dhandowal. Dhandowal is surrounded by Nakodar Tehsil to the east, Lohian Tehsil to the west, Sultanpur Lodhi Tehsil to the north, Sidhwan Bet Tehsil to the south.

== Schools and colleges ==
- Mata Sahib Kaur Kh. Senior Secondary School
- Government Primary School
- Mata Sahib Kaur College
