= Communist Consolidation =

Indian revolution organization (1935–38)

- Leaders: Shiv Verma; Hare Krishna Konar; Niranjan Sengupta
- Founded: 26 April 1935 (91 years ago) at Cellular Jail, Port Blair, Andaman
- Dissolved: 1938
- Country: British India
- Ideology: Communism; Marxism–Leninism; Revolutionary socialism
- Political position: Far-left
- Part of: Communism in India; Revolutionary movement for Indian independence

Communist Consolidation (1935 – 1938) was a radical communist organization, founded by the prisoners of the Cellular Jail who were influenced by the philosophy of Marxism. In the mid-1930s, it became the largest resistance group against British rule in the jail; this organization also led the historical 36-day hunger strike in 1937, where the British government had to bow before the demands of the political prisoners and shift them to the mainland.

== History (before 1935) ==
The history of Communist Consolidation starts before its official formation in 1935. On 12 May 1933, some of the prisoners of Cellular Jail gathered and started a hunger strike, causing the deaths of Mahavir Singh, Mohan Kishore Namadas, and Mohit Moitra. The British Raj acceded to the demands of the freedom fighters to stop the hunger strike, and finally, after 46 days, the hunger strike ended on 26 June 1933.

== Formation in 1935 ==
In 1935, Communist Consolidation was founded by 39 inmates, but the main mastermind to form this group was Hare Krishna Konar. The majority of its members belong to the minority tendency of the Marxist and Communist or Jugantar part of Anushilan Samiti. Although this was a secret revolutionary group, the members of this organization swelled higher and higher.

They started a study circle named "A Veritable University of Freedom Fighters" and this group also started to teach about the principles of Socialism, Marxism, and Communism, explaining how the October Revolution happened, who was Karl Marx and Friedrich Engels, and finally, in 1936, the members of this organization claimed that they were fighting to uproot British Raj as well as to fight for the working class and backward class people; they understood that class struggle is equally important as freedom.

They only used the class struggle and political slogans “Inquilab Zindabad” and “Duniya ke Mazdooron, ek ho!” because they claimed that at first they were nationalist prisoners, but after the formation of the Communist Consolidation and reading about the principals of Socialism, Marxism, and Communism, they started believing themselves as political prisoners.

== Second hunger strike ==
The long hunger strike movement in the Andamans in July and August 1937, led by the Communists, marked an important phase in India's national struggle. As nine-tenths of the total convicts in Andaman were from Bengal, the hunger strike of Andaman prisoners caused widespread outrage in Bengal, where a strong movement for the release of political prisoners began.

== Prominent members ==
Name	Involved in	Later life
Ambika Chakrabarty	Chittagong armoury raid of the Jugantar Party	Joined the Communist Party of India, became elected to the Bengal Legislative Assembly, and became a Member of the West Bengal Legislative Assembly.
Ananta Singh	Chittagong armoury raid of the Jugantar Party	Joined the Communist Party of India. In the late 1960s, he formed a new far-left political group, the Revolutionary Communist Council of India, in Calcutta, but its members committed a number of bank robberies to raise funds for the purchase of weaponry and ammunition. This time of his life is extremely controversial.
Bejoy Kumar Sinha	Lahore Conspiracy Case of the Hindustan Socialist Republican Association	Joined the Communist Party of India. In 1962, he contested the election from the Kanpur constituency but got defeated in that election.
Ganesh Ghosh	Chittagong armoury raid of the Jugantar Party	Joined the Communist Party of India, during the 1964 split in the Communist Party of India, he sided with the Communist Party of India (Marxist), became the Member of the West Bengal Legislative Assembly and the Member of the 4th Lok Sabha.
Hare Krishna Konar	Begut Robbery Case of the Jugantar Party	Joined the Communist Party of India, and during the 1964 split in the Communist Party of India he became the founding member of the Communist Party of India (Marxist), the chief architect of the West Bengal land distribution, became the Minister of Land & Land Revenue and the Member of the West Bengal Legislative Assembly.
Niranjan Sengupta	Leader of the Barisal branch of the Dhaka Anushilan Samiti	Joined the Communist Party of India and became a Member of the West Bengal Legislative Assembly and During the 1964 split in the Communist Party of India, he sided with the Communist Party of India (Marxist) and became the Minister of Refugees, Relief and Rehabilitation, and Jails, of the Government of West Bengal.
Satish Pakrashi	Anushilan Samiti	Joined the Communist Party of India, became a member of the West Bengal Legislative Council. During the 1964 split in the Communist Party of India, he sided with the Communist Party of India (Marxist) and became a member of the Communist Party of India (Marxist), West Bengal
Shiv Verma	Lahore Conspiracy Case of the Hindustan Socialist Republican Association	Joined the Communist Party of India and became Secretary of the Uttar Pradesh state committee. During the 1964 split in the Communist Party of India, he sided with the Communist Party of India (Marxist).
Subodh Roy	Chittagong armoury raid of the Jugantar Party	Joined the Communist Party of India, during the 1964 split in the Communist Party of India, he sided with the Communist Party of India (Marxist) and became a member of the Communist Party of India (Marxist), West Bengal
Sudhangshu Dasgupta	Mechuabazar Bomb Case of the Anushilan Samiti	Joined the Communist Party of India, later became the founder editor of the Deshhitaishee. During the 1964 split in the Communist Party of India, he sided with the Communist Party of India (Marxist) and became a member of the Communist Party of India (Marxist), West Bengal, and also became a member of the state secretariat for a period.
Thakur Ram Singh	Dogra Shooting Case, in which he killed a British Officer named Dogra	Member of Bhagat Singh’s Hindustan Socialist Republican Association. Later Joined the Communist Party of India (Marxist).

== See also ==
- Communist movements in India
- Revolutionary movement for Indian independence
- Communist involvement in the Indian independence movement
