= Hare Krishna Konar =

Indian revolutionary and politician (1915–1974)

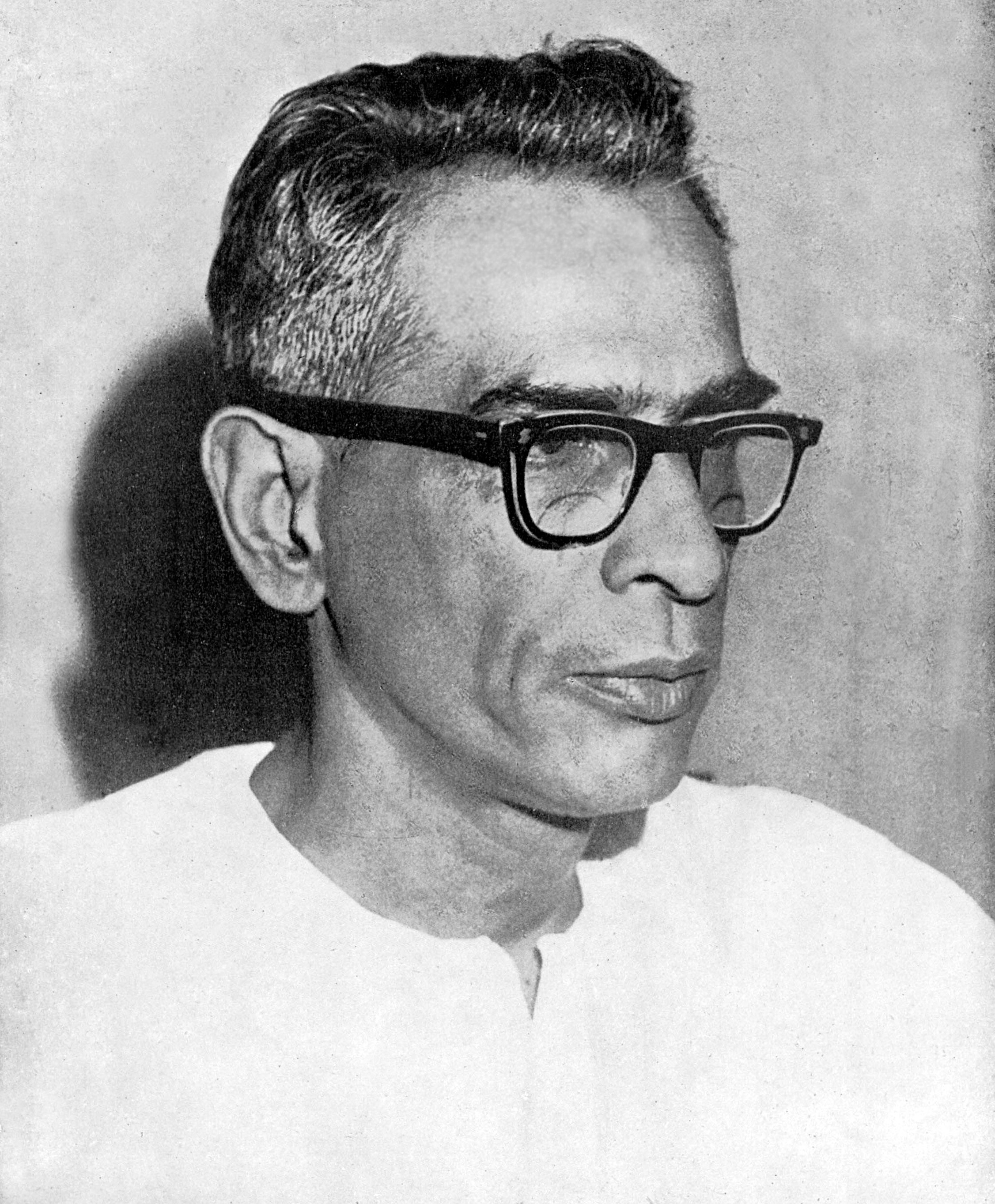
- Official portrait, 1970

General Secretary of the All India Kisan Sabha
- In office 28 January 1968 – 23 July 1974
- Preceded by: Office established
- Succeeded by: K. Chathunni

1st Minister of Land & Land Revenue, Government of West Bengal
- In office 25 February 1969 – 16 March 1970
- Chief Minister: Ajoy Mukherjee
- Preceded by: Vacant
- Succeeded by: Benoy Choudhury (Note: In 1977, the title of the office was renamed to Ministry of Land & Land Reforms.)
- In office 1 March 1967 – 21 November 1967
- Chief Minister: Ajoy Mukherjee
- Preceded by: Office established
- Succeeded by: Vacant

Member of the West Bengal Legislative Assembly
- In office 1957–1972
- Preceded by: Baidyanath Sanyal; Rash Behari Sen
- Succeeded by: Nurul Islam Mollah
- Constituency: Kalna

Deputy Member of the Administrative Committee of the TUIAFPW
- In office 1970–1974
- General Secretary: Claude Billault

Personal details
- Born: 5 August 1915 Kamargoria, Bardhaman district, Bengal Presidency, British India
- Died: 23 July 1974 (aged 58) Kolkata, West Bengal, India
- Cause of death: Neck cancer
- Resting place: Keoratola crematorium
- Party: Communist Party of India (Marxist) (1964–1974); Communist Party of India (1938–1964)
- Spouse: Biva Konar (m. 1941)
- Relatives: Benoy Krishna Konar (brother); Maharani Konar (sister-in-law)
- Education: Bangabasi College (Note: Did not graduate)
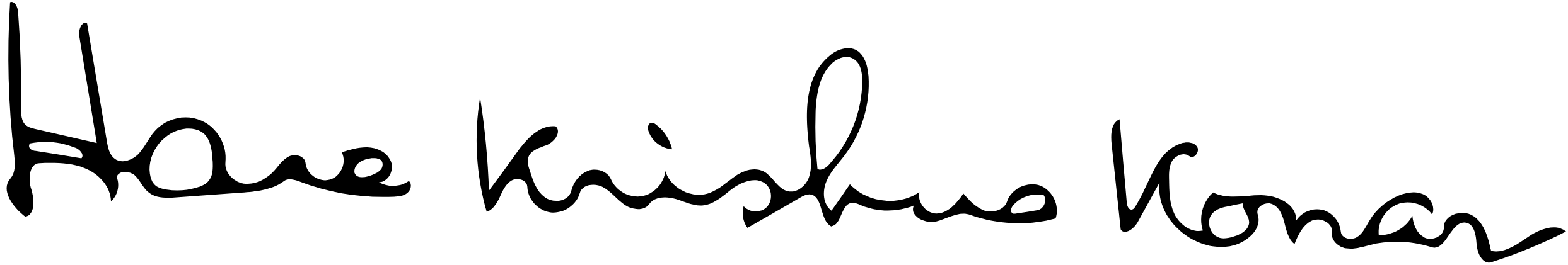
- Signature

Hare Krishna Konar (ISO: Harē Kr̥iṣṇā Kōṅār, /ˈhɑːrə ˈkrɪʃnə ˈkɔːnɑːr/; 5 August 1915 – 23 July 1974), also known as H. K. Konar, was an Indian Marxist revolutionary, agricultural theorist, peasant leader, and politician who was one of the founding members of the Communist Party of India (Marxist) and was the chief architect of India's first and largest agrarian reform in West Bengal. (Note: Hare Krishna Konar was the 1st Minister of Land & Land Revenue of West Bengal.) Between the 1960s and 1970s, he became one of the principal leaders of Communist movements in India. In 1932, Konar was deported to the Cellular Jail of the Andamans for 6 years at the age of 18 for his involvement in the Begut Robbery case of the Jugantar Party; there he took part in the first hunger strike, and in 1935 he founded the Communist Consolidation (Note: The Cellular Jail convicts formed an Indian revolutionary and communist organization based on the Marxism–Leninism doctrine. Later, it became the main resistance group against British control in the jail.) and led the historical second hunger strike.

== Early life and nationalism (1915–1932) ==
Hare Krishna Konar was born to a Bengali Ugra Kshatriya family on August 5, 1915, in Kamargoria, a village across the Damodar River in the Bardhaman district of the Bengal Presidency, British India. His father, Sarat Chandra Konar, was a well-known businessman and landlord of Burdwan who had a very close relationship with the ruler of Bardhaman Raj, Bijay Chand Mahtab, while his mother, Satyabala Konar, was a housewife. As Konar was born to a Zamindar family, eventually he grew up in a very privileged manner in an Indian-style joint family with his young siblings, as he was the eldest son of Sarat Chandra Konar and Satyabala Konar. There were no political or anti-government activists associated with his family; moreover, his father had good connections with British officials for his trade purposes.

Konar started school in the same village, at Kamargoria Prathmik Bidyalay, and he has always been an excellent student in studies as well as in social life. During his school days, Konar was interested in multiple subjects, particularly Sanskrit and Physics. After finishing his primary education in Kamargoria, along with his parents, he moved to Panihati in the North 24 Parganas district, then to Bardhaman district, and finally settled in the South Radhakantapur village of Memari. He began his high school education at Memari Vidyasagar Smriti Vidyamandir. Later, he completed his intermediate education at the same school.

After moving to the new village, the Congress leader of Burdwan, Bibhuti Bhusan Dutta, used to visit their house on a regular basis since Bibhuti Babu and his father had good relationships; Konar used to listen to their discussions about politics and independence movements taking place throughout the countryside. From Bibhuti Babu, Konar heard about the new leader who had recently made his name in Indian politics, M.K. Gandhi, who had come out with his new idea of Ahimsa Andolan and launched his first Satyagraha movement that was participated in by teachers, professors, lawyers, college students, and school students, but the teachers of Memari Vidyasagar Smriti Vidyamandir never encouraged their students for the independence activities; they actually tried many ways to maintain distance between movements and the school students.

Konar was soon influenced by the fascinating philosophy of Ahimsa, which led him to participate in the Satyagraha Campaigns and Burdwan Congress political activities. Konar goes to school and then secretly leaves at lunchtime to join the campaigns. He regularly goes to the meetings and rallies. But one day, a meeting regarding "Revolutionary culture" was going on, and Konar was there in the meeting. A person who knows Konar and his father spotted him standing in the rally dressed in school uniform and ran home to inform Konar's father that Konar was attending a political event. Then his father arrived and caught him for the first time at political and anti-government rallies. Konar's father came and grabbed his hand to take him back home. After this incident, his family completely isolated Konar so that he couldn't attend or stay away from these independence and political meetings because his father, Sarat Chandra Konar, had a great reputation in the village and Burdwan city as a wealthy businessman who wanted to send Konar to the University of Oxford for further studies, and if he went into politics, his career would be destroyed.

Again, after a few years, Konar became active in political activities, and at the age of 15, while studying in the ninth grade, Hare Krishna Konar was jailed for picketing in front of Burdwan Raj College. After being released from jail, Konar was again isolated by his family, but he ran away from home to join the Civil Disobedience Movement and was jailed again in April 1930, this time for six months in Burdwan jail. In jail, he met with Benoy Choudhury, who was also arrested for participating in the disobedient movement, and they talked about various types of topics. He also spoke with other revolutionaries who had been imprisoned for their involvement in the armed struggle revolution and had been influenced by the armed revolutionary doctrine.

After being released from prison, Konar moved forward with the mindset of joining the armed revolutionary movement. By giving up the process of nonviolence, he moved towards the armed struggle and showed particular skill in creating secret revolutionary groups in and around Memari. It was during this time that Bhupendranath Dutta and Bankim Mukherjee were introduced to the revolutionary group of Burdwan. Under Dutta and Mukherjee's influence, the Burdwan revolutionary group got the supply of various Marxist books along with the news about the case, which appeared in the newspaper articles about the Meerut Conspiracy Case. Hare Krishna Konar started his political activities as an active member of the Jugantar revolutionary party in our country's freedom struggle against British imperialism. As a political activist, his beginning was from involvement in various activities of the revolutionary movement of Jugantar.

While still a student, Konar finished his 10th standard with first division in all subjects and a letter in Sanskrit from Memari Vidyasagar Smriti Vidyamandir. He then went to Calcutta and took admission as a first-year science student in Bangabasi College under the University of Calcutta. In Calcutta, he stayed at the Canning Hostel on Scott Lane, met Abdul Halim, and joined the Calcutta armed revolutionary group. However, he was also in contact with Benoy Choudhury and Saroj Mukherjee of the Burdwan armed revolutionary group.

After a few days, the Calcutta Party's funds were practically reduced, and there was an urgent need for money. Bipadbaran Roy, one of Konar's friends, lived in Calcutta but also spent time in hostels. So, one afternoon, Bipadbaran Roy's uncle, a government employee, arrived with 10,000 rupees and put it at his home, so it was determined that they would rob the money and use it for the party's funds. So Bipadbaran, Konar, and a few others went to the residence and took all of the money, as well as some extra gold and cash. However, this amount was insufficient for their funds. So, Konar broke his father's chest in Memari to get the remaining money for the group. Konar gradually emerged as a revolutionary figure at Bangabasi College, which was the center of Swadeshi and revolutionary students who were directly associated with the Anushilan Samiti or Jugantar party.

The armed struggle revolution reached its peak in 1931. In February, Anushilan Samiti's allies, HSRA leader Bhagat Singh, were sentenced to death, while in London, M.K. Gandhi built the Gandhi–Irwin Pact. Independence activists slowly began to oppose Mahatma Gandhi and his nonviolent ideas. Finally, in March 1931, the key figures of the Indian armed resistance revolution, Bhagat Singh and Chandra Shekhar Azad, were hanged and shot to death. Following that, Gandhi organized another Satyagraha movement, which was met with opposition from many students and from numerous revolutionary parties. As a result, the armed struggle revolution expanded, and revolutionary groups spread throughout the country. At the same time, the "Indian Proletarian Revolutionary Party" was established by Panchu Gopal Bhaduri, Kali Ghosh, Bankim Mukherjee, Bhupendranath Datta, and others. The Indian Proletarian Revolutionary Party was also recognized as a branch of the Communist Party of India. Konar, along with Benoy Choudhury, joined the group. Konar soon became involved in various kinds of revolutionary activities, including bomb making, robbery, and party fund management, and gradually rose to the position of leader of that organization.

== Six years in Cellular jail (1932–1938) ==
Hare Krishna Konar became known as the youngest face of the Indian Proletarian Revolutionary Party and was a firebrand mastermind behind many cases, but on September 15, 1932, he was caught and arrested in the Begut Robbery Case, despite the fact that Konar had been tracked by British officials for many months over his activities. Konar's detention came as a tremendous shock to his family, as Sarat Konar had already made all possible arrangements for Konar to move to London, England, for his further studies at the University of Oxford.

Konar was brutally tortured by police after his arrest and throughout his custody period. However, he tolerated all of the torture inflicted by the British police and never spoke about any revolutionaries or their future plans. In the special tribunal case, the police charged Hare Krishna Konar with robbery and murder under Sections 694 and 398 of the Indian Public Penal Code, respectively. Following his arrest, he was taken to Midnapore Central Jail, and the tribunal's decision was given in Calcutta High Court on January 20, 1933. During his court trial, Konar was asked whether he was guilty of his revolutionary activities against the British Empire. Konar replied:

What I have done is not shameful, and the consequences will be something I am proud of.

After his address to the court, the judge stated:

Therefore acquit the accused of the charge under section 398 IPC with regard to the sentence to death on the accused under section 394 IPC. We have the consideration on the one hand that the offence is exceedingly grave one and on the other hand the youth of the accused who is to be about 17 years age, taking both the circumstances into account sentence the accused to undergo rigorous imprisonment six years.

After announcing the rigorous imprisonment, Hare Krishna Konar had no remorse for it. Again for a month he was kept in Midnapore Central Jail, and in February 1933, the Central Government, in consultation with the Government of Bengal, decided that all prisoners who had been sentenced for 5 years or more would be sent to the Kālā Pānī, that is, the Cellular Jail. As a result of the government's decision to give him the highest punishment of Kālā Pānī, at the age of 18, Konar was sent to the Cellular Jail of the Andaman and Nicobar Islands in April 1933 by the Maharaja ship of the British Empire. As a companion on the ship, Hare Krishna Konar got revolutionaries like Satish Pakrashi, Niranjan Sengupta, Dr. Narayan Roy, and Dr. Bhupal Basu convicted in the Mechuabazar Bomb Case or Dalhousie Bomb Case.

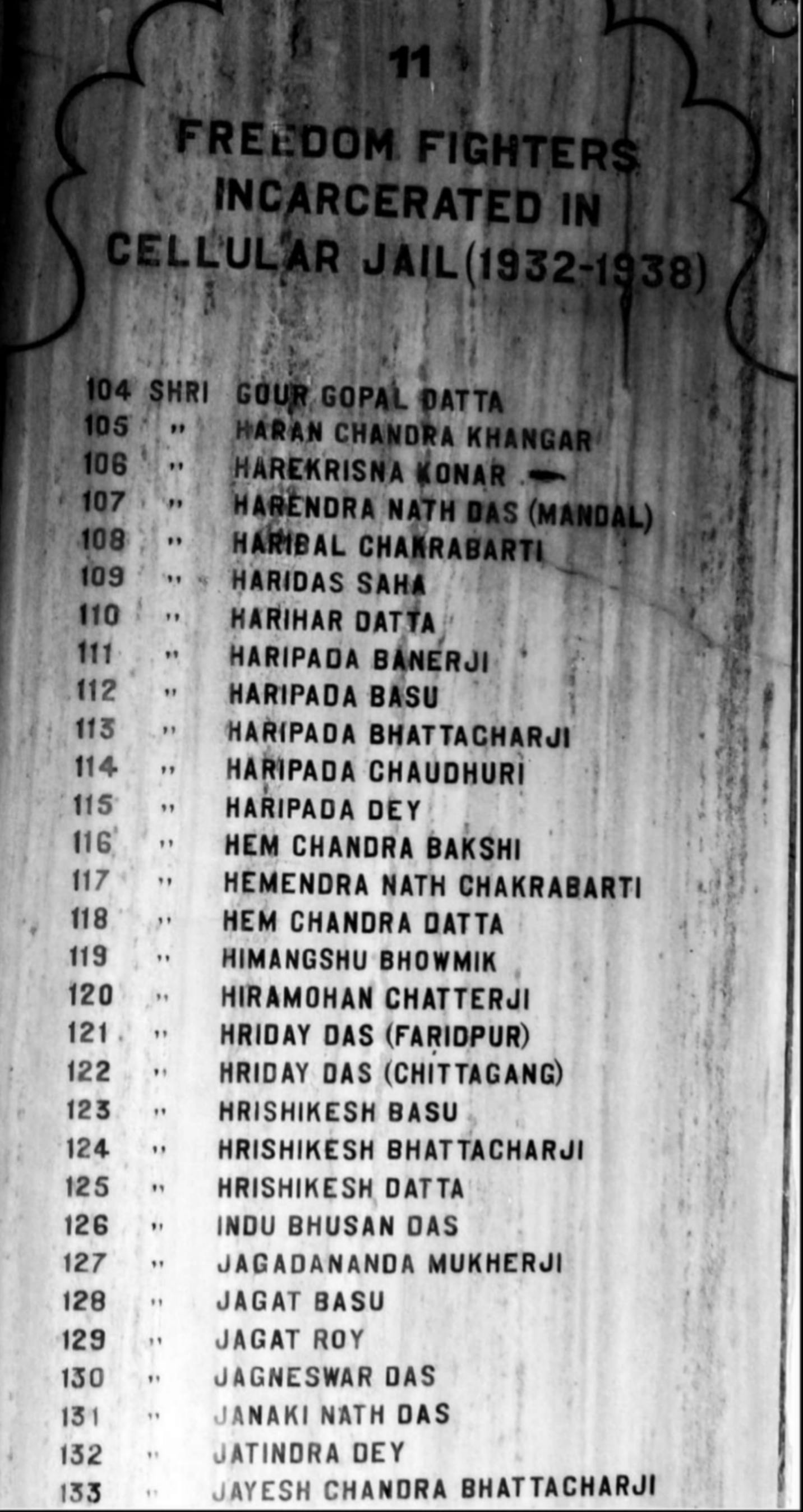
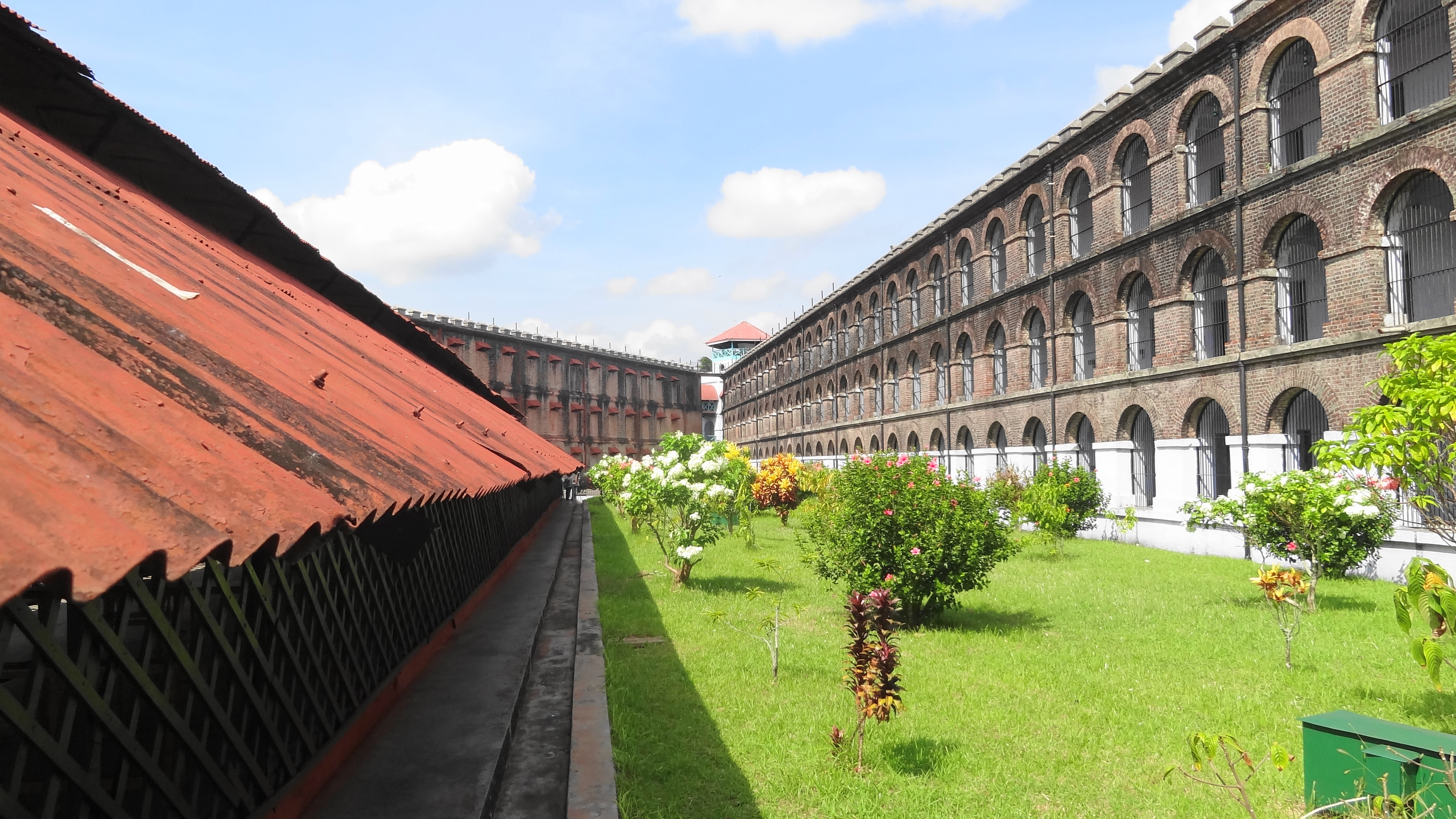
(left) 106 = Hare Krishna Konar (The list of names engraved in the wall of the Cellular Jail); (right) View of the Cellular Jail.

Soon after the imprisonment in cellular jail, Konar faced the inhumane and unimaginable tortures of Kālā Pānī; they were subjected to both physical and mental torture. The food provided was unfit for human consumption, with worms in the bread and wild grass boiled in rotten vegetables. Rainwater was provided for drinking, yet it was contaminated with insects and worms. The 13×6 cells were dark, damp, and dingy, with thick moss coating. There were no toilets, lights, or reading materials, and prisoners were not allowed to meet with others; the guards carried out physical torture and flogging; their behavior was insulting; things had become unbearable. So, the prisoners came to a conclusion to do a hunger strike against the jail authorities to improve the systems in jail. Soon, on 12 May 1933, the hunger strike was fast and undo death. Mahavir Singh (arrested for the Lahore Conspiracy Case), Mohan Kishore Namadas (arrested for the Calcutta Arms Act Case), and Mohit Moitra (arrested for an Arms Act Case) died for force-feeding by British warders during this hunger strike. Their bodies were quietly ferreted away and thrown out to the Indian Ocean, so that the Indians could not get an issue to revolt against the British governments. The inspector of Central Jail Lahore, David Barry, had to appear to break the hunger strike; he issued instructions to stop the strike of drinking water. The freedom fighters remained consistent, and the hunger strike sparked widespread outrage across India. After 46 days of hunger strike, the British Raj had to bow down and request to stop the hunger strike, and they stated that the facilities they were demanding would be approved, thus the revolutionary of Cellular Jail accepted it, and the hunger strike ended on June 26, 1933. And soon the facilities from cellular jail authorities improved. Light was fixed in every cell; opportunity to play sports; cultural events were organized by the jail authority; and jail work was reduced to minimal. Prisoners were allowed and given: soap to bathe, bed to sleep, edible food; allowed to study; given respect by the jail authority to the prisoners; allowed to communicate amongst themselves; the prisoners who were less dangerous had been released but were under the eyes of Britishers; and various other facilities were also expanded.

During the hunger strike, Konar met with Dr. Narayan Roy, Niranjan Sengupta, Satish Pakrashi, Ganesh Ghosh, Sudhangshu Dasgupta, Shiv Verma, Bejoy Kumar Sinha, and many more. As after the hunger strike, the supervision and checking process in the jail was extremely reduced, so the prisoners had been able to smuggle in a lot of Communism and Socialism literature. Dr. Narayan Roy and Niranjan Sengupta smuggled the largest volume of literature in the cellular jail from the Pro-Marxist group of Central Jail Lahore and from the Congress Socialist Party group of Yerawada Central Jail. Several prisoners were well educated and were given access to a wide range of books for study while in jail. When they were released, prisoners handed over their literature to the other revolutionary. Many brought their own literature secretly on their way to Andaman, unchecked by the so many authorities that formally checked them. The prisoners also requested the warders outside the Andaman jail to get books directly from book smugglers; the prisoners also requested their relatives to bring the specific books via letter; when they arrived in jail, the authorities checked them and, finding them objectionable, set them aside. However, other revolutionary prisoners who work in the jail office picked up those books and gave them to their comrades. Konar also arranged to bring many books from his Memari's house for his study, and his main responsibility was to read those books all day and then meet at a particular place in the evening to explain the substance of each book in detail to the other revolutionaries. The cellular jail authority made a library for the revolutionaries, but the control of the library passed into the hands of all the left radicals who were formerly revolutionary and named the library as "The Veritable University of Revolutionaries". This was around the year 1935. The prisoners spent most of their time reading communist or socialist literature in "The Veritable University", and a thirst for books and knowledge began. There were students, doctors, lawyers, peasants, and workers all together, discussing politics, economics, history, and philosophy, as the result that there was hardly any left who had not become a confirmed Communist or Socialist. Hare Krishna Konar, Shiv Verma, and Satish Pakrashi organized study circles in which the ideas of Socialism, Marxism, and Communism were explained; doctors among them taught biology and physiology, while others taught historical and dialectical materialism. As the revolutionaries gathered to discuss and read, a novel and unique environment appeared. Hare Krishna Konar and Shiv Verma soon decided to form a party organ known as the Communist Consolidation, and on April 26, 1935, the Consolidation was established with 39 inmates. National slogans such as "Vande Mataram" and "Bharat Mata ki Jai" were never used. The consolidation members only use the slogans "Inquilab Zindabad" and "Dunia ka majduro ek ho". Dhanwantri, Bejoy Kumar Sinha, Batukeshwar Dutt, Niranjan Sengupta, and Narayan Roy were appointed to the editorial board of a newspaper named "The Call", which was published from the jail. The Call was started as a monthly paper and acted as a mouthpiece of communist consolidation. The number of members in communist consolidation swelled to 200, and all of them contributed articles on different subjects dealing with Communism, Marxism, Socialism, the biographies of Vladimir Lenin, Karl Marx, etc. The Call was like a magazine paper; only one copy was written and placed in the library; it had about 150 pages. Later, the consolidation member celebrates May Day, October Revolution Day, Vladimir Lenin's birthday, etc. These activities of the Communist Consolidation continued unhindered till about the middle of 1937. The Chittagong Arms Group members therefore started military parades, at first without the sanction of the authorities, but a little later with the full approval of the authorities. They also had their uniform prepared; they prepared their buttons and badges from the silver utensils they were given for use. Ananta Singh was the lead instructor of this parade, and they put on an impressive show. When they marched past and performed several laying and attacking formations with bamboo sticks instead of muskets, they looked magnificent. Members of the Communist Consolidation were so fascinated by the Chittagong group's military actions that they asked their leaders for permission to join the Chittagong group's daily parades. This increased the number of Chittagong paraders to over 90, and consequently all of the Chittagong arms group members also joined the Communist consolidation. This is the time of 1937 when the prisoners were enjoying their daily activities and saying themselves as political prisoners of Cellular Jail.

In 1937, the revolutionaries of the cellular jail began to feel the atmosphere of a world war, and the freedom fighters believed that before the war began, we should return to the mainland India to be with our people and take an active role in the Anti-war movement. After studying Marxism, Communism, and Socialism, the freedom fighters in jail identified themselves as political prisoners and wanted to seek treatment similar to those in other jails. On July 9, 1937, Shiv Verma and Hare Krishna Konar petitioned Viceroy and Governor-General, The Marquess of Linlithgow, stating:

All political prisoners should be repatriated to the mainland and released. An ultimatum was given that if these demands were not met, a hunger strike would begin.

But the viceroy, The Marquess of Linlithgow, did not respond, so on July 25, 1937, the 385 political prisoners went on hunger strike. Some of the other 80 prisoners were released by telling the jail authorities that they were going on personal business, but in reality they were going to propagate and encourage Indians to protest against the British government to transfer the prisoners from Andaman to the mainland, creating noise and protesting the forced feeding by the jailers. The prisoners also arranged to get information about Indian reactions to the hunger strike; it had already been agreed that newspapers containing Indian reactions would be smuggled into the jail via some warders and other contacts made with some of the local peoples. A nationwide movement on the mainland in support of demands of the Andaman freedom fighters began to be treated similarly to other political prisoners in other jails. There was a mass demonstration of working people, intellectuals, and students. This upsurge clearly showed that their people on the mainland did not forget them. After four weeks, telegrams from leaders of the nation, Jawaharlal Nehru, Subhas Chandra Bose, Mahatma Gandhi, etc., poured in imploring the freedom fighters to end their hunger strike. Even poet Rabindranath Tagore sent a letter to The Viceroy on 3 August 1937 stating that:

I, as a poet, appeal to you to transfer the political prisoners of cellular jail to the mainland as the hunger strike begins, and we cannot allow this flower of the nation to wither away, so please don't use cellular jail as a concentrating camp of revolutionaries, and you have to release the political prisoners from jail.

Letter to Hare Krishna Konar on 28 August 1937 by Mahatma Gandhi and the Congress Working Committee stating that:

The whole nation, along with me and Congress working committee members, appeals to you to end the hunger strike and assures you to take up your demands and to see them fulfilled.

After a lot of deliberation and discussion, this historic 36-day hunger strike of 200 revolutionary freedom fighters ended. The process of repatriation started on 29 November 1937. There were a total of 385 freedom fighters in jail at the time. 339 from Bengal, 19 from Bihar, 11 from Uttar Pradesh, 5 from Assam, 3 from Punjab, 2 from Delhi, and 2 from Madras, and most of the members of this organization, along with Hare Krishna Konar, were previously members of Jugantar and Anushilan Samiti or from Pro-Marxist groups. By January 1938, Konar was back in Bengal from the Cellular Jail of the Andaman and Nicobar Islands. At first, Hare Krishna Konar was kept in Dumdum Central Jail for some time and transferred to Burdwan Jail, from where he was finally released on 27 March 1938.

After being released from jail in 1938, he met with Muzaffar Ahmed, Abdul Halim, Bankim Mukherjee, and Bhupendranath Datta, with whom Konar worked before being imprisoned in 1932. After his release, he met with them again and became a member of the Communist Party of India, as well as being involved in mainstream Indian politics. From that year on, Konar's Communist movement and path of anti-capitalism and struggle for the rights of workers, peasants, and hardworking people began.

== Communist movement (1938–1974) ==
He first worked among the workers and trade unionists in Calcutta and Howrah. After some months Comrade Benoy Chowdhury took him to Bardhaman district and he started working in the kisan (farmers) movement. In 1939, he participated in the Canal Tax protest in Bardhaman district. In 1940 he was banned by the British Government from entering Asansol, Burnpur area and later on from Bardhaman district. But he still worked from underground in Bardhaman, and he was once arrested for few months.

In 1944 he was again arrested and he was banned by the government to step out of Bardhaman City. He played important role during the Ajay river Dam movement of 1943–1944 and second stage of Canal Tax protest of 1946–1947. While canvassing for elections in colliery area of Asansol he was physically assaulted by goons, and his legs were broken. In March 1948 when the CPI was banned, he was arrested immediately for 3 months. After being released he went into hiding and remained so until 1952. His chief role was maintaining communications between Kolkata, Bardhaman, Howrah and Hooghly in this time. He played an important role during the Food Movement of West Bengal in 1953, and Civil Disobedience movement in 1957, and was arrested both times. Sino-Indian war fighting began on the Himalayan border on 10 October 1962 between the Chinese People's Liberation Army and Army of India. This issue that fueled the split in the Communist Party of India was parting of the ways between the USSR and China. Though the conflict had a long history, it came out in open in 1959, Nikita Khrushchev sought to appease the West during a period of the Cold War known as 'The Thaw', by holding a summit meeting with U.S. President Dwight D. Eisenhower. Two other reasons were USSR's unwillingness to support Chinese nuclear program and their neutrality in the initial days of Sino-Indian border conflict. These events greatly offended Mao Zedong and the other Chinese Communist leaders. In 1962, Mao Zedong criticised Nikita Khrushchev for backing down in the Cuban Missile Crisis. By that time the Soviets were openly supporting India in its border dispute with China. These events were followed by formal statements of each side's ideological positions: the Chinese came out with their document in June 1963. The Soviets too came out with their own document. Thereafter the two parties stopped communicating. During the 1962 Sino-Indian war, other parties portrayed left-wing parties as pro-China, since both were Communist. Hare Krishna Konar among with other Communists stated that the left Wings was focused on solving the border dispute through talk. As of 1963 the All India Kisan Sabha had been rendered dysfunctional as most of its key leaders and cadres had been jailed. However, by late 1963 and early 1964 most of jailed AIKS leaders and cadres were released from prison. During the 1964 split in CPI, there were efforts to retain AIKS as a united organization. However, there were tensions between the CPI(M) and CPI factions within AIKS, per Surjeet (1995) a mayor source of tension was the rejection of the rightists to demand release of jailed AIKS leaders. Among the AIKS grassroots, the majority sided with CPI(M). But the split in the AIKS top leadership was 'somewhat uneven' per Sharma (1978). Its president, Gopalan, went to CPI(M) whilst the general secretary Bhowani Sen sided with CPI(Right). Among key Central Kisan Council members, the ones that sided with CPI(M) included Lyallpuri, Parulekar, Konar, C.H. Kanaran and N. Prasad Rao. In the CPI(Right) faction, in the Central Kisan Council key leaders included Manali C. Kandaswami, B.V. Kakkilaya, Jagannath Sarkar, Z.A. Ahmed and Karyanand Sharma and on 11 April 1964, the landmark incident happened in Delhi, the "Leftist faction" happened in Communist Party of India national council including 30 Leftists P. Sundarayya, M. Basavapunniah, T. Nagi Reddy, M. Hanumantha Rao, D.V. Rao, N. Prasad Rao, G. Bapanayya, A.K. Gopalan, A.V. Kunhambu, C.H. Kanaran, E.K. Nayanar, V.S. Achuthanandan, E.K. Imbichibava, Promode Dasgupta, Muzaffar Ahmed, Abdul Halim, Hare Krishna Konar, Saroj Mukherjee, P. Ramamurthi, M.R. Venkataraman, N. Sankariah, K. Ramani, Harkishan Singh Surjeet, Jagjit Singh Lyallpuri, D.S. Tapiala, Bhag Singh, Sheo Kumar Mishra, R.N. Upadhyaya, Mohan Punamiya, and R.P. Saraf and two Centrist leaders, E. M. S. Namboodiripad and Jyoti Basu, walked out from the meeting to protest against the "revisionist policies" of General Secretary Shripad Amrit Dange and his followers, particularly the failure to have "class struggle" as its main policy. Shripad Amrit Dange's followers had an overwhelming majority in the National Council and The left fraction section organised their own conference in Tenali, Andhra Pradesh. These thirty-two leaders were also suspended from National Council of Communist Party of India on that day 11 April 1964. The left leaders who were ousted, in turn, announced a separated national convention. while the leftist fraction group holds a parallel congress in Tenali, Andhra Pradesh and The leftist section, to which the 32 National Council members belonged, organized a convention in Tenali, Andhra Pradesh 7 to 11 July. In this convention, the issues of the internal disputes in the party were discussed. 146 delegates, claiming to represent 100,000 CPI members, at the Tenali convention a Bengal-based pro-Chinese group like konar, mukherjee, Dasgupta, basu and halim, representing one of the most radical streams of the CPI left-wing and in that meeting they decided to make the party in 7th Congress of Communist Party of India. The Congress government of P C Sen in Bengal arrested many of the breakaway group's leaders days before the Congress, and in 1964 Hare Krishna Konar was imprisoned for two years, for that's why he could not take part in 7th Congress of Communist Party of India's parallel where the Communist Party of India (Marxist) were formed in Calcutta, for that reason he could not able to be the member of 1st Politburo but he was elected as central committee and after some months many other communist leader was also arrested for joining the seventh Congress in Calcutta, such as the former chief minister of Kerala, E. M. S. Namboodiripad, the organisational specialist Promode Dasgupta, the former Chief Minister of West Bengal, Jyoti Basu, the Telangana revolutionaries, Puchalapalli Sundarayya and Makineni Basavapunnaiah as well as some members of the rightist section such as the trade unionist A. B. Bardhan and was released after an order from the Supreme Court of India in 1966. By 1967 AIKS was divided into two parallel organizations, as a consequence of the split in the party. At the August 28, 1967 Central Kisan Council meeting in Madurai, differences arose over the membership figures. The CPI(M) faction in AIKS accused the CPI faction of presenting false inflated membership data of state units in order to increase their influence in the organization. The dispute led to a walk-out from the Central Kisan Council. In 1968 Hare Krishna Konar was elected as the first general secretary of the new fraction from rightist organization to leftist. He was one of the co-founders of Communist Party of India (Marxist) when it was formed from Communist Party of India in 1964. From 1957 he was a member of the West Bengal State Council of CPI. From 1964 until his death he was a member of West Bengal State Committee of CPI(M). From 1958 he was a member of National Council of CPI and from 1964 until his death he was a member of Central Committee of CPI(M). From 1954 until his death he was the Secretary of West Bengal Provincial Kisan Sabha (part of All India Kisan Sabha) and Member of central council of All India Kisan Sabha CPI. From 1968 until his death he was the General Secretary of All India Kisan Sabha CPI(M). He was also the Member of Chinese Communist Party, Communist Party of Vietnam, Communist Party of the Soviet Union and the Member of Trade Unions International of World Federation.

=== In West Bengal government ===
1957–1962
In the West Bengal Legislative Assembly election of 1957, Hare Krishna Konar and Jamadar Majhi was elected as the representative of the Kalna constituency and the Communist Party returned as the second largest party with an increased representation. This platform enabled the Communist Party under the leadership of Jyoti Basu in West Bengal to exacerbate agitations against the prevalent food crisis in West Bengal by acting as the principal opposition on the floor of the assembly, increasing public awareness and providing a united front for agitators to rally around.

1962–1967
In the West Bengal Legislative Assembly election of 1962, Hare Krishna Konar was once again re-elected as the representative of the Kalna constituency. In the following period the Communist Party underwent a vertical split with a section of the party including Hare Krishna Konar going on to form the Communist Party of India (Marxist). There were several ongoing ideological conflicts between sections within the Communist Party with regards to the nature of the Indian State and the characterisation and method of interaction with the Indian National Congress, with regards to the approach towards the ongoing debate between the Soviet Union and China and with regards to the handling of the border disputes between India and China. These debates were further exacerbated by the food movement in West Bengal and brought to the forefront by the rising border tensions between India and China. The Communist Party had also become the second largest party in the Lok Sabha following the 1962 Indian general election with nearly 10% vote share which is described to have brought prominence to the internal divisions of the party.

1967–1969
In the West Bengal Legislative Assembly election of 1967, fourteen opposition parties contested through two pre-poll political alliances; Communist Party of India (Marxist) led United Left Front and the Communist Party of India and Bangla Congress (splinter of the Congress party formed in 1966) led People's United Left Front. The Communist Party of India (Marxist) became the second largest party outstripping its former party, the Communist Party of India. Following the election, the two alliances joined forces to form the United Front government in West Bengal. During the negotiations between the two alliances, Jyoti Basu was denied the position of chief minister due to opposition to the idea from the Communist Party of India and Bangla Congress, all of whom eventually settled for Ajoy Mukherjee of the Bangla Congress as the consensus candidate for the position while Jyoti Basu became the deputy chief minister and in-charge of the finance department and Hare Krishna Konar as the Minister of Land and Land Revenue. The government however collapsed within a year when the food minister, P. C. Ghosh resigned from the government after facing persistent agitations led by the Communist Party of India (Marxist) (both part of the same government) against his policy of seeking voluntary measures from landlords and middlemen which were ineffective in resolving the food crisis.

1969–1971
For the mid term West Bengal Legislative Assembly election of 1969, the United Front Committee was formed consisting of all the coalition partners of the previous government which agreed upon a pre-poll alliance to contest the election together under a 32-point programme. Under terms of the agreement, if the alliance were to attain a majority then Ajoy Mukherjee would become the chief minister while Jyoti Basu would become the deputy chief minister. In addition during the negotiations Basu was able to secure the portfolios of fisheries, food, excise, labour, civil defence and education for the CPI-M as well as Minister of Land and Land Revenue was changed his name to Minister of Land and Land Reforms and the minister was Hare Krishna Konar. In the election, the United Front won an overwhelming victory with 214 out of 280 seats and as a consequence the Communist Party of India (Marxist) stood as the first party other than the Congress party to become the largest party in the assembly.

The second United Front government however too fell within a short period of time, on this occasion the chief minister Ajoy Mukherjee resigned in March 1970 after facing an aggravated and dysfunctional government where smaller member parties were in confrontation with the Communist Party of India (Marxist), the largest among them on various issues. The government continued to be operational until the dissolution of the assembly by presidential proclamation on 30 July.

1971–1972
In the following West Bengal Legislative Assembly election of 1971, the parties contested alone but Communist Party of India (Marxist) remained as the single largest party while increasing its number of seats from 80 to 113. Both the former chief minister Ajoy Mukherjee of the Bangla Congress and the former Minister of Land and Land Revenue of the Communist Party of India (Marxist) contested from the Kalna constituency which ended with Hare Krishna Konar and Jyoti Basu winning.

1972–1972
In the West Bengal Legislative Assembly election of 1972, Congress won an overwhelming majority and Siddhartha Shankar Ray who was previously in the Bangla Congress and later appointed as a specialised union cabinet ministry called West Bengal Affairs Minister became the new chief minister of the state. The Communist Party of India (Marxist) was only able to secure 14 seats and Hare Krishna Konar for the first time lost his seat in the Kalna constituency to his former associate Nurul Islam Molla. Before the election, the Communist Party of India allied with Congress while a section of the Bangla Congress had also merged with the Congress. The opposing alliance was led by the Communist Party of India (Marxist) which included the previous members of the United Left Front alongside the Biplobi Bangla Congress, a splinter of the Bangla Congress.

=== Naxalbari uprising ===
Naxalite movement derives its name from Naxalbari, a small place in Siliguri subdivision of Darjeeling district of West Bengal. It all started in 1967 after the first non-congress government came into power under the name of United Front Government. The dominant forces in the government were the Leftists. The main forces were the CPI and the CPI(M). They represented the aspirations of the marginalized and the poor. The minister-in-charge of Land and Land Revenue was Hare Krishna Konar who was a veteran peasant leader. In an interview with his party mouthpiece Ganashakti, he made his intentions clear about the quick distribution of surplus land and he further asked for peasant initiative and organized force. What he did not realize was that the aspirations of the poor peasantry were already on a high note and his invitation escalated them further. As the later developments showed they went far beyond his expectations. Although there were no doubts about the intentions of the leftists in the government about the redistribution, the path to achieve the goals was not that simple. There were some constraints before government. To name a few first they were not sure about how to recover the land from the landlords. Second the landlords could take the help of law to delay the seizure of land and thus postpone the redistribution for an indefinite period. Third was the working of the bureaucracy. There were some instances of even defying the orders of the ministers. As a result of these obstacles, the government could not implement the land reforms quickly. The CPI(M) was in a difficult situation because it was in the power so it could not totally do away the legal and official procedure and on the other hand the aspirations of the peasantry had to be satisfied. Everyone was not happy with government policy of redistributing the land through legal process. One of such prominent figures was Charu Mazumdar who was attacking Hare Krishna Konar on three accounts. The first point was that he submitted to the bureaucrats and feudal gentry. The second point was that there might be disputes among the peasants who acquired the land through legal process and those who got it through forceful means. The third point was that the peasants who would acquire the land through legal process might eventually become a complacent middle farmer. Developments at Naxalbari: In this light a peasants’ conference was held under the auspices of CPI(M) at Naxalbari and it gave a call for ending the monopoly ownership of land by landlords, organization and arming of peasants to destroy the resistance of landlords. Among the sponsors of the conference were Kanu Sanyal and Jangal Santhal who later became prominent leaders of the Naxalbari movement. Both of them were in favor of political propaganda and mass mobilization what was opposed by Charu Mazumdar. He wanted only action. So there were some differences on the part of the strategy to be followed but they were clear on many points such as that India's liberation could be achieved only through China's path, propagation of politics of agrarian struggle among the working class and the peasantry and building up a secret party to prepare cadres for this purpose. As a result of those differences pointed out already, Siliguri Local committee cadres decided to go on the path of mass movements whereas West Dinajpur unit decided to stick to the idea of Charu babu. Now the mobilization started on a large scale. From March to April (1967) all the villages of the Naxalbari were organized and 15000 to 20000 peasants were enrolled as whole time activists. They soon occupied the land in the name of peasants’ committees, burnt all land records, cancelled all hypothetical debts, and passed death sentences on oppressive landlords. They also formed armed bands by looting guns from the landlords, armed themselves with conventional weapons and set up a parallel administration to look after the villages. By May of that year itself three or four places were totally under the control of rebels. In the meantime Charu babu addressed a meeting of the cadres and asked them to always be on the side of the poor and landless peasant. He said that our relation with rich farmers would always be of struggling nature. Observing that the situation going out of control UF government woke up and Hare Krishna Konar was sent to the Naxalbari region and he asked the rebels to put down their arms and file the petition for the distribution of land vested with the government. It was also agreed that all the persons wanted by Police would also surrender. But the agreement was never implemented. Just after the return of minister from that place, a Police camp was established there. In the wake of these developments the first serious clash between Police and the peasants occurred on 23 May 1967, when a policeman was killed and in retaliation police opened fire on a crowd of villagers and killed nine people. Out of them six were women and two were children. This incident created tensions within and outside the United Front government. The West Bengal Secretariat condemned the incident and accused Chief Minister Ajoy Mukherjee, an ex-Congressman of laying ‘one sided stress on police measures to maintain law and order’. Meanwhile, news of clashes between peasants and landlords kept pouring in from Naxalbari and between third and 10 June. There were as many as eighty incidents of dacoity, two murders and also one abduction. Mr. B. Chavan Union Home Minister told the Lok Sabha that a reign of terror has been created in Darjeeling. By the end of June while the leadership of Communist Party of India (Marxist) was openly against the Naxalbari rebels. In Calcutta several groups within and outside CPI(M) were coming together. These groups formed the Naxalbari Peasants Struggle Aid Committee, which became a nucleus of separate party of the future. CPI(M) expelled 19 members in the light of the formation of the committee. In the meantime some other important developments were also taking place. On 28 June Radio Peking supported the movement and dubbed the United Front government as a ‘tool of Indian reactionaries to deceive the people’. This was the first incident of Chinese support to rebels and of Peking's disenchantment with CPI(M). On 12 July a major police action was launched. Although Chief Minister claimed that it was cabinet's decision, but CPI(M) tried to dissociate itself from the police action. The Chief Minister also came under attack. By 20 July the prominent leaders like Jangal Santhal were arrested and by October 1967 an apparent lull was set in Naxalbari. Assessment of the Naxalbari Movement and causes for its failure: Coming to the evaluation of the Naxalbari Movement, we should keep in mind that although it was a moderate success it was suppressed within a few months. It enjoyed immense mass support, but it could not sustain for a long period of time. There are mainly two versions for the failure of the movement. One is from the point of view of Kanu Sanyal and other one is from the point of view of supporters of Charu Mazumdar. Kanu Sanyal's in his famous Report on the 'Terai Peasants’ Movement has penned down some of the reasons. The main reason according to him was excessive reliance on the spontaneity of the masses and taking them as armed forces. Among the other reasons were the inclusion of some vagabonds and making them leaders of the movement. Lack of proper plan for the redistribution of grabbed land led to conflicts among the peasants. But according to him the main defect was failure to establish a powerful mass base. Talking about military weakness of the movement, Kanu Sanyal admitted that the revolutionaries underrated the strength of the State machinery and thought that United Front Government would not go to the extent of suppressing the movement.

== International Communist movement ==
Konar knew many international languages, which include Chinese, German, Korean, Russian, Spanish, Vietnamese, etc. He was a member of the International Department of the Chinese Communist Party and a member of the International Department of the Communist Party of Vietnam. He attended the Communist Party of Cuba's conference at Havana, Cuba in 1970 and met with Fidel Castro; He attended the Progressive Party of Working People's conference at Nicosia, Cyprus in 1970; He has also attended the Communist Party of the Soviet Union's conference at Moscow, Soviet Union in 1971; He attended the Romanian Communist Party's conference and met with Nicolae Ceaușescu at Bucharest, Romania in the 1960s; He had also attended Workers' Party of Korea's conference at Pyongyang, North Korea in 1971 and met with Kim Il Sung; He attended Italian Communist Party's conference at Rome, Italy in 1971; He attended the Mexican Communist Party's conference at Mexico City, Mexico in 1973 and Socialist Unity Party of Germany's conference at Berlin, Germany in 1973. Konar was invited to several universities throughout the world for his contributions to land reform policy, including the University of Oxford, the University of Cambridge, Brown University in the United States, and many more.

=== Controversial Hanoi congress ===
In the year 1960, the Communist Party of Vietnam held its Third National Party Congress in Hanoi, Vietnam, from 5–12 September 1960. Konar and K. Damodaran were the delegations of the Communist Party of India. Ajoy Ghosh, the general secretary of the Communist Party of India, instructed Konar and Damodaran to avoid interacting with the Chinese delegations of the Chinese Communist Party (CCP) at the Hanoi Conference due to the Sino-Soviet split and the party's ties with the Soviet Union. Eventually, in Vietnam, Konar met with Ho Chi Minh, the 1st President of Vietnam, and Phạm Văn Đồng, the 1st Prime Minister of Vietnam. Konar and Ho Chi Minh discussed an important topic. Firstly, he said, "What can India do to support Vietnam's revolutionary struggle?" Ho Chi Minh stated that all they want is support and fraternity from the people of India, simply to explain Vietnam's struggle to the people of India. Secondly, Konar inquired as to the validity of reports concerning the dispute between the Soviet Union and China, as well as the evacuation of all its engineers and technicians from both countries. Ho Chi Minh became serious and added, "Unfortunately, it's true". Konar stated that you are the most recognized senior living comrade with international recognition. You step in to handle the issue between these two parties. Ho Chi Minh became more serious, stating that he was older and well-respected by everyone. However, he is the leader of a "small country party". Konar noticed the pain in Ho Chi Minh's eyes and face. Later, I learned that he attempted to address the issue. He traveled all the way to Moscow via Peking, but as a "small country leader", he may have been unable to prevent the situation from escalating. Conflict within the international communist movement also harmed Vietnam. But, like a realistic leader, he and his party accepted reality; they rallied under the banner of Marxism and Anti-imperialism struggle and prepared the Vietnamese people for a long and difficult struggle. Knowing that the people of Vietnam could have to give their blood alone, he did not abandon them in the fight against ruthless American imperialism.

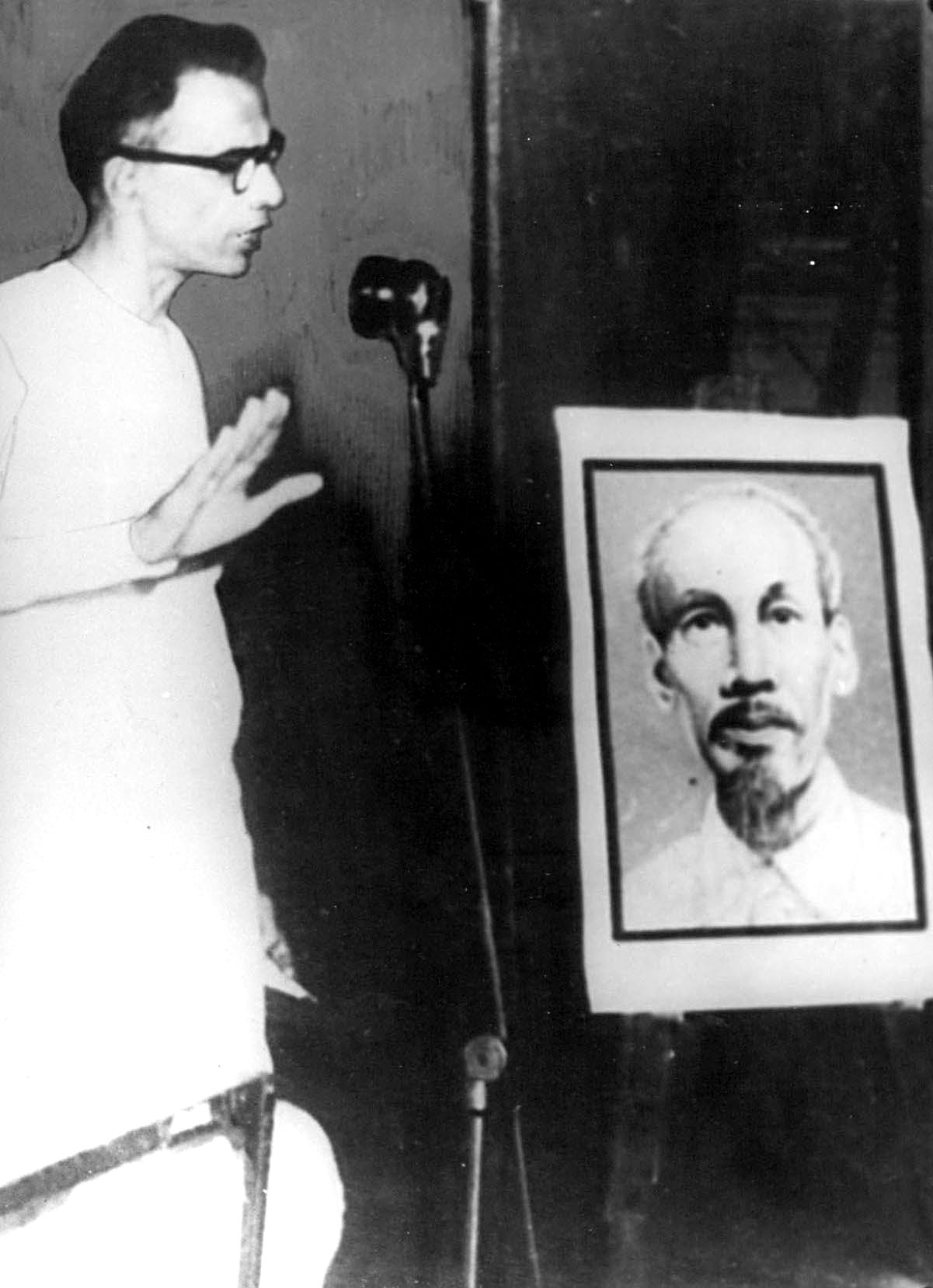
Konar giving lecture in Vietnam in 1969

Konar also spoke about India–Vietnam relations and discussed the issue of land reform implementation in Vietnam, economic reform in Vietnam, and the future of the Communist Party of Vietnam and the Socialist Republic of Vietnam. After a series of discussions with Ho Chi Minh, Pham Van Dong, and other central committee leaders, Konar realized that the Sino-Soviet conflict needed to be solved since it would affect the Indian Communist movement as well as the international Communist movement. So Konar decided to meet the Chinese delegations; although Damodaran rejected it, Konar met with them and accepted their invitation to visit Peking, immediately after the national party congress in Hanoi. Konar fled to Peking, China. In September 1960, Konar visited Peking and met with Mao Zedong, Zhou Enlai, Liu Shaoqi, Lin Biao, and other leaders. The meeting between Mao Zedong and Hare Krishna Konar was a watershed moment in Indian Communist history. When Konar returned to India, he advocated for CCP viewpoints on border issues and the larger ideological dispute between the Communist Party of the Soviet Union and the CCP. This was the first direct attempt by the CCP to establish influence within the Communist Party of India.

=== Trade Union International ===
Hare Krishna Konar was the deputy member of the Administrative Committee of the Trade Union International of Agricultural, Forestry and Plantation Workers (TUIAFPW), which was the Communist Bloc of the World Federation of Trade Unions. He attended and led many Trade Union International conferences, such as the 21st meeting of the Administrative Committee of the TUIAFPW from 28 to 31 August 1972 in Prague, Czechoslovakia, and at the Berlin, East Germany, meeting of the Administrative Committee of the TUIAFPW from 28 to 31 August 1973.

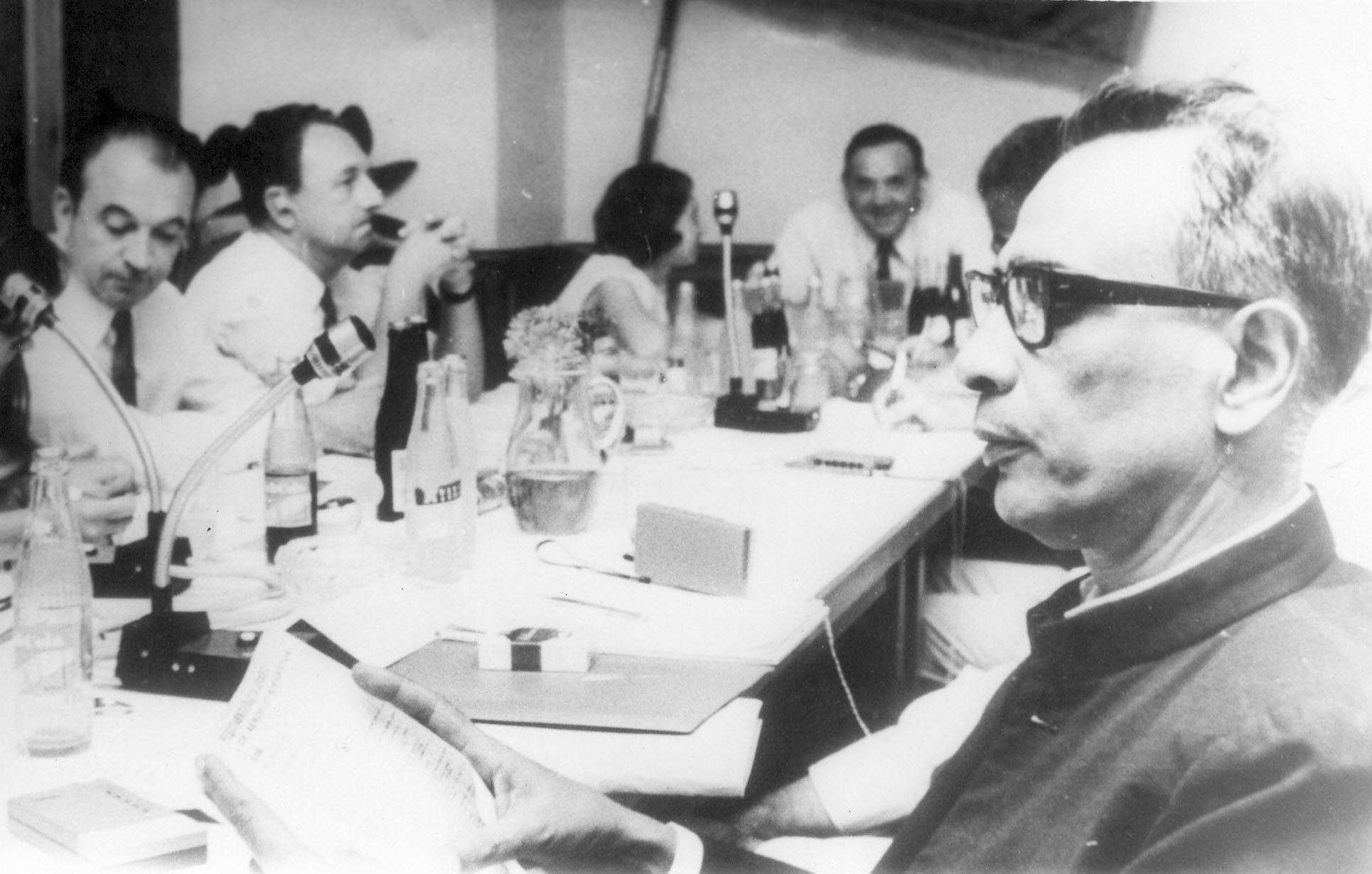
Konar in the conference of Trade Union International in the 1970s

== Land reform policies ==
Hare Krishna Konar played a leading role in getting surplus land held by big landowners in excess of land ceiling laws and kept ‘Benami’ (false names) vested with the state. The quantum of land thus vested was around one million acres (4,000 km^{2}) of good agricultural land. Subsequently, under the leadership of Hare Krishna Konar and Benoy Choudhury, land was distributed amongst 2.4 million landless and poor farmers. It has been argued that this land reform, along with Operation Barga of 1978, formed the base for the Left Front victory in subsequent elections.

It was a strange quirk of history that at each stage of West Bengal's two-phase land reforms, there was a stalwart to guide and lead the program. One was Hare Krishna Konar, the other Benoy Choudhury; both of them were totally committed to the cause, profound believers in the principles of Scientific socialism. The fearsome volatility of Konar was necessary to remove the immobility of the administration and to break the stranglehold of the landed gentry of West Bengal on society and the political establishment in the late sixties. The amiable Gandhian mode of accommodation of Benoy Choudhury was equally essential in another socio-political setting to carry a large majority of people with him for the success of the massive "Operation Barga". Each performed his unique role to carry out land reforms in two different historical situations. Soon after the first United Front (UF) government came to power in 1967, the first arrow of the now-famous Naxalbari movement was shot, killing inspector Wangeli of the West Bengal Police. The countryside was seething with discontent. It was a troubled time when Hare Krishna Konar became the land and land revenue minister. His talks with his old compatriot Kanu Sanyal, held in a jungle about 6 km away from the Sukna forest bungalow from midnight to early morning, had failed. The new government faced a militant peasant movement. Konar was convinced that any attempt to suppress the movement by the brute force of the repressive machinery of the state would help spread the movement through underground channels. Being a practitioner of the militant peasant movement himself, he knew the fish-in-the-water tactics of armed partisan action. He was determined to evaporate the water by weaning away the landless and land-poor peasantry by substantially meeting their land hunger. And that could be done only through the vesting of ceiling surplus land held clandestinely by the landed gentry of the state. Shortly after assuming power, Hare Krishna Konar appointed Parimal Bandyopadhyay as director of land records and surveys and put him in charge of unearthing land held "Benami" in excess of the ceiling and vesting it in the state through due process of law.

=== Ingenious strategy of Konar and Choudhury ===
Though the United Front came to power with tremendous electoral support, it had to function strictly within the rigid parameters of the Indian Constitution, the established basic laws, judicial review of executive action, and set legal and administrative procedures and practices. Any threat to any of the established parameters would have led to a summary dismissal by the not-so-friendly central government. The political genius of Hare Krishna Konar lay in his ability to play his own ball game with the same set of rules that were apparently set against it. The Constitution of India guarantees the right to form associations and unions and to assemble peaceably. The Indian Evidence Act permits disbelief of documentary evidence on the strength of overwhelmingly reliable oral evidence. The Criminal Procedure Code (CrPC) (u/s 110) allows some sort of public participation for gathering evidence against a person allegedly engaged in "bad livelihood" in order to bind him down for good behavior. Nowhere is it stated that the restraining powers under the CrPC should always be used against the peasantry and workers. If the agricultural workers and sharecroppers assemble peacefully to espouse a cause, if public order was threatened by landowners, the latter could be restrained under the CrPC in the interest of maintenance of public order. Combine the essence of these constitutional and legal rights and procedures, and you have the "Konar" recipe of legal reform with popular participation. It was so simple, so bold, and so novel. Konar did not approve of the seizure and occupation by force of private property by peasants, even though such lands had in many cases been held 'benami'. Peasants, according to him, were conservative by nature. In their psyche, private property was inviolable. Having lost their land through the process of exploitation, they hankered for their land as their own property. Hence, illegal occupation of even illegally held land would not absolve them of the sense of guilt for an illegal and even immoral action. Therefore, they would not have the courage and determination to fight for their rights if threatened with eviction in a changed political situation. Konar, therefore, favored the legal way of vesting land in the state. Once the land became the property of the state, what would happen to it would be a matter of state policy, and no individual's property rights would be involved. It may look strange for a revolutionary, but being a hard-headed realist, it made sense to Konar.

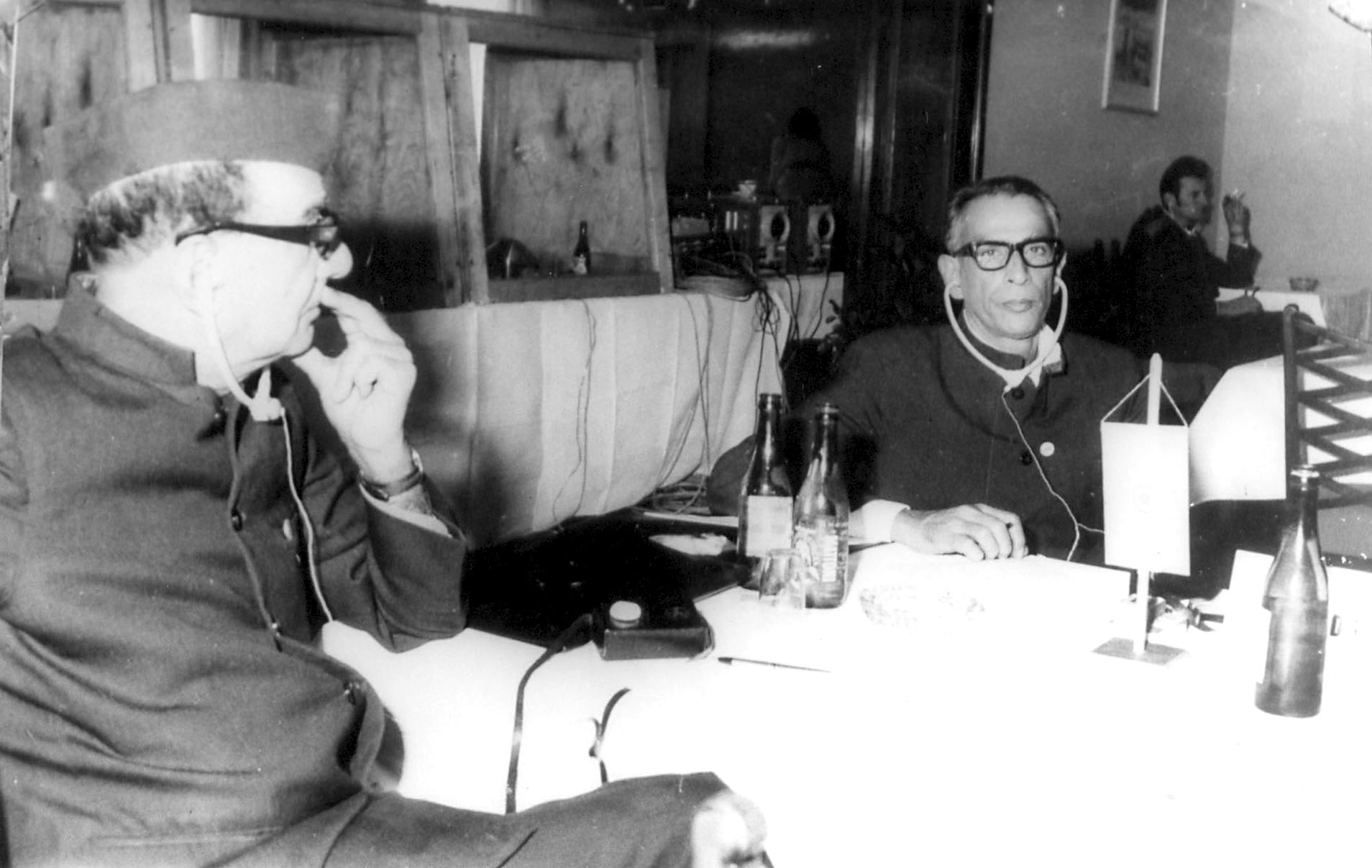
Konar giving an interview on land reform in the Broadcasting House of the BBC at London

=== Detecting evasion ===
Konar asked the director of land records and surveys, Parimal Bandyopadhyay, to prepare a few actual case studies based on diligent investigation of the methodology used to disperse ceiling surplus land in a clandestine manner and then deduce the approach to be used for legally recovering such lands. The ministerial instruction resulted in the preparation and publication of a brochure entitled "A Note on Evasion of Ceiling Law in West Bengal (1967)", which detailed the methods employed by different families in different parts of West Bengal to evade the ceiling law. (The publication was withdrawn from circulation when the state was under president's rule in 1968) From the analysis, it came out that the following stages would be involved in any all-out effort to vest land in excess of the ceiling:

(i) identification of families possessing or suspected of possessing land above ceiling. (ii) locating and identifying all plots of land in the effective and real possession of every such family and tracing of 'benami' lands held through fictional and collusive transactions. (iii) initiating the quasi-judicial process of vesting all surplus land (including 'benami' lands) by gathering adequate evidence that would stand the scrutiny of review/appeal at higher levels of administrative tribunals or courts of law. (iv) taking over possession of vested land after quasi-judicial processes. (v) assigning such land according to law or prescribed priority to the landless or land-poor peasantry. (vi) providing a mechanism to prevent illegal physical eviction from the assigned land. (vii) some provision for consumption and production credit to enable the new resourceless allottee to start cultivation without falling into the debt trap of the former patrons.

If one analyzed some of the stages, particularly the first three, it would be clear that much of the crucial information, intelligence, and admissible evidence could be obtained only from agricultural workers, tenants, and sharecroppers working on lands of such landed families. Konar effectively utilized the mass organizations for gathering evidence from such witnesses to demolish well-crafted fictitious documents regarding benami lands. A state of disbelief prevailed on both sides. The witnesses could not imagine that the authorities would trust their oral testimony, denouncing cunningly drafted documents. Landowners could not believe that their own trusted and loyal agricultural workers and sharecroppers would have the initiative and courage to tell the truth and denounce their "masters" before the public authorities. Many witnesses stood firm in the face of grueling cross-examination and revealed many more secrets. It was the alchemy of mobilization that encouraged the witnesses. What started off as a trickle induced from outside soon turned into a voluntary deluge of evidence coming from organized and often not-so-organized peasants and peasant groups. And within a short period of less than three years (1967–70), nearly 1 million acres of land were vested with the state through strictly legal processes, which ultimately stood the scrutiny of the courts of appeal. It broke the backbone of the economic power and social dominance of the landed aristocracy of West Bengal. But an ugly feature of this magnificent effort was the fierce internecine fight among the UF partners for the occupation of vested land. Konar, who was so insistent on the legality of vesting, took a completely different line so far as the distribution of vested land was concerned. Instead of going through any established procedure, he encouraged extra-legal occupation by peasant groups. This resulted in competition among the UF partners to occupy vested lands, which caused bloodshed among the partners, and ultimately the second UF cracked under internal pressure. Whatever the internal dynamics of the second UF, the fact remains that Konar succeeded in weaning away the poor peasantry from the naxalite movement. When they found that they could get land legally by joining one of the recognized political outfits without any militancy, they promptly eschewed the violent mode of naxalism. Naxals raved and ranted against this land reform, calling it a sham exercise for defrauding the struggling peasantry. They almost abruptly stopped it when Charu Mazumdar's ceiling surplus land of 12 acres or so got vested. Charu Mazumdar's wife wrote an angry letter denouncing the "corrupt" bureaucracy for denying her the only means of livelihood. Naxals turned urban terrorists soon after. Here is a lesson for Andhra Pradesh and Madhya Pradesh, but it is certain that they will not learn anything from it. Thus ended the first phase of land reform in West Bengal in 1970–71.

=== Second phase ===
After the death of Konar in 1974, the land reform movement was carried out by Benoy Choudhury, and after the remarkable victory of the Left Front in the 1977 West Bengal Legislative Assembly election. After 1977, to implement land reform quickly, it was renamed Operation Barga. To implement Operation Barga, the government adopted the principle of people's participation in land reforms and collective action by the stakeholders. This movement was launched with the active assistance of not only the bargadars themselves but also of rural workers' organizations and self-governing institutions. To begin with, group meetings between officials and bargadars were organized during "settlement camps" (also called "reorientation camps"), where the bargadars could discuss their grievances. The first such camp was held at Halusai in the Polba taluk in the Hooghly district from 18 to 20 May 1978. Later, this became one of the most successful land reforms in India by carving out the legacy of Konar.

== Personal life ==
=== Marriage ===
After being released from jail in 1938, Konar's father intended to put his son into business and expand the value of his assets. Despite his disappointment, he refused to give up. He believed that if he could get his son married and have children, then Konar would have to return home. Finally, after three years of trying, Konar agreed to the marriage, but only under three conditions:

1. No dowry should be taken.

2. Paying 1500 rupees to the Communist Party funds.

3. Being allowed to talk separately with the bride before marriage.

His father agreed to the conditions of his marriage, and before marriage, Konar talked with Pramila Dan and told her that:

I am a jailed communist. In the future, I must be in jail or hiding, and I may even be killed. Can you continue in this uncertain life of mine?

Pramila Dan replied that:

Yes! I can continue with you in your uncertain life.

In 1941, Konar married Pramila Dan, the eldest daughter of Sribrajeshwar Dan, a wealthy landlord. The wedding ceremony took place at the house on Mohunbagan Lane, Hatibagan, Calcutta. After marriage, Konar renamed Pramila Dan as Biva Konar.

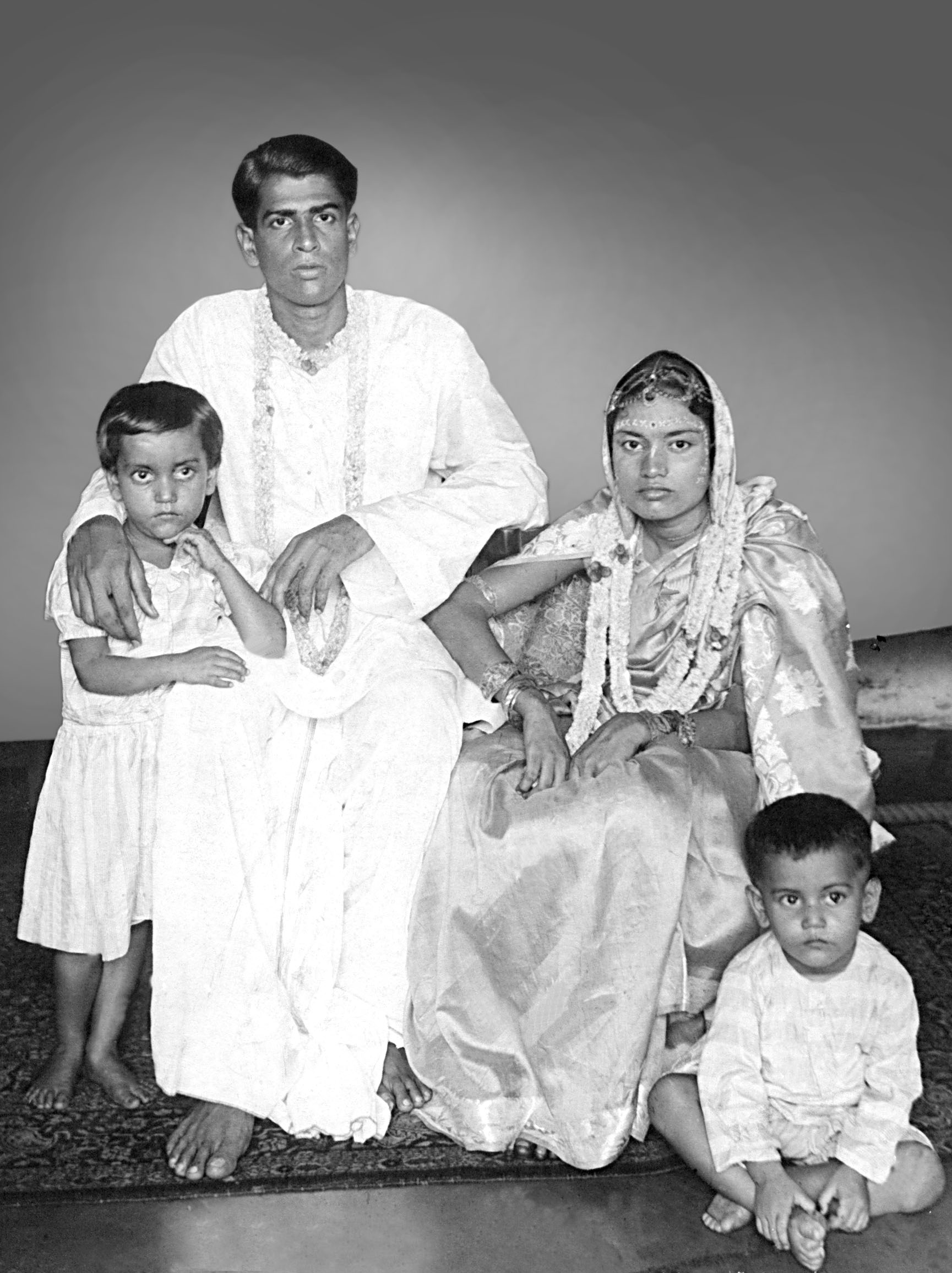
H. K. Konar and Biva Konar in 1941

After Konar's marriage, his father hoped that Konar would stay at home and look after his business, but within three months of marriage, Konar received an arrest warrant, and Benoy Choudhury took Konar's wife, Biva Konar, to a secret lair, and she had to go underground with her husband. Sribrajeshwar Dan was a wealthy zamindar; therefore, when his daughter married, he gave her a lot of jewelry. However, during their party life, Biva Konar almost sold all of her jewelry for the party funds. Although there was no political tradition in the paternal family of Biva Konar, there was a simple devotion to her husband's ideals and an uncanny ability to throw herself into the crowd at the expense of the conventional notions of individual happiness—Biva Konar was a simple image of simplicity.

=== Family ===
During their underground time period, Biva Konar gave birth to a daughter. Later, she gave birth to another two sons. Konar spent the last few months of his life living at his Beniapukur house in Calcutta with his wife and two sons, as his daughter got married. However, after Konar's death in 1974, his wife, Biva Konar, with his two boys, shifted to Bardhaman, where Biva Konar later became an active member of the All India Democratic Women's Association, although she had been active in politics and a member of the Communist Party of India from 1943, and after the 1964 split in the Communist Party of India, she sided with the Communist Party of India (Marxist) and was a member from 1964 until her death.

Konar's younger brother, Benoy Krishna Konar, who was also a firebrand peasant leader and later became the national president of the All India Kisan Sabha, became the chairman of the Central Control Commission of the Communist Party of India (Marxist). Benoy Konar was also a member of the West Bengal Legislative Assembly from the Memari Assembly constituency for more than 7 years.

Konar's sister-in-law, Maharani Konar (wife of Benoy Krishna Konar), was a veteran communist leader and politician and one of the founding leaders of the All India Federation of Anganwadi Workers and Helpers. She was a member of the West Bengal State Committee of the Centre of Indian Trade Unions. Maharani Konar served as a member of the West Bengal Legislative Assembly, representing the Memari Assembly constituency for over 13 years.

== Death ==
In 1974, Konar was diagnosed with neck cancer because of his excessive smoking of cigarettes and cigars, and due to his critical condition, he immediately traveled to the United States for treatment. In the States, the doctors strictly mentioned to him not to smoke or speak loudly. He came back to India and was in a routine for a few months. However, throughout the 1970s, Indian and West Bengal politics were at their peak. So he initially ignored doctors' advice and began attending meetings and oratory.

His condition gradually deteriorated day by day, and in June 1974, due to his severe condition, Konar was admitted to the Kimber Nursing Home in Park Circus, Kolkata. And throughout his hospital period of one month, Konar met multiple leaders, journalists, and researchers and talked with them about different national and international issues. In the month of July, the first operation was done successfully, and another operation was underway. But unfortunately, after the second operation, he slowly moved towards death, and on 23 July 1974 at 18:30, he died of neck cancer at the age of only 58 in Kolkata.

The death was followed by public mourning on an unprecedented scale. The next day, July 24, at 10:00, he was brought to Muzaffar Ahmad Bhawan at 33 Alimuddin Street. His body was in the hall of the PC office, and countless people lined up from 10:00 to 15:00 to pay their last respects, including Indira Gandhi, many other cabinet ministers, and international delegations from North Korea, Vietnam, China, and the Soviet Union. The work of giving garlands went on till 15:00. When his body was taken to the street on the way to A.J.C. Bose Road to Keoratola crematorium via Dharmatala, the police and volunteers wore a helpless look as a sea of people poured in from every possible corner of the city. It had nearly taken 2 hours to cross the road from Dharmatala to Keoratola, and finally, at 18:00, Konar was cremated in accordance with Hindu rites at the Keoratola crematorium on the banks of the Ganga, where he was cremated in electric furnaces. He was given a state funeral by the Government of West Bengal. On July 25, there was a statement published in all the national and state newspapers that:

In a funeral procession, Calcutta streets had never witnessed such a gathering like this before.

== Ideology and practices ==
Hare Krishna Konar believed Communism was the only doctrine capable of eliminating oppression, which made it an effective source of inspiration for the struggle against the British. As Konar was born in the era of World Communism of the 1920s, moreover, a fraction of Indian freedom struggles were divided between the ideology of nonviolence and radical communism; eventually, the communist ideology attracted him very early in his life.

As a staunch Communist, Konar eventually became a staunch atheist, and he did not believe in any religion or god. When he was asked whether he believed in religion, he stated that:

Religion is a personal matter; thus, focusing on religion is unnecessary for me; rather, we should always focus on social hierarchy and class struggle.

Despite his atheism, Konar often used phrases from the Mahabharata, Ramayana, and Vedas during his oratory to connect with the mass of rural India. He always embraced Bengali culture and the Bengali attitude by wearing a Dhoti and Panjabi. His normal lifestyle, powerful, bold oratory, and revolutionary struggle made him a charismatic figure between the peasants and workers of rural India.

=== Nationalism ===
Konar regarded Mahatma Gandhi, the anti-colonial nationalist and Congress leader, as a young freedom hero. Konar feels that the concept of Ahimsa and nonviolence is an excellent ideal that has surely influenced the Indian independence movement, but it has failed to address its root cause, and such politics will just replace one set of exploiters with another. So, in many ways, Konar criticized Gandhian philosophy and his nationalist ideas.

During the Sino-Soviet split, Konar's hardline pro-Chinese stance in the Communist Party of India, where the party has always been with the Soviet Union, led to controversies. His visit to China in 1960, despite General Secretary Ajoy Ghosh's prohibition, set his fame as a pro-Chinese communist and anti-Soviet communist.

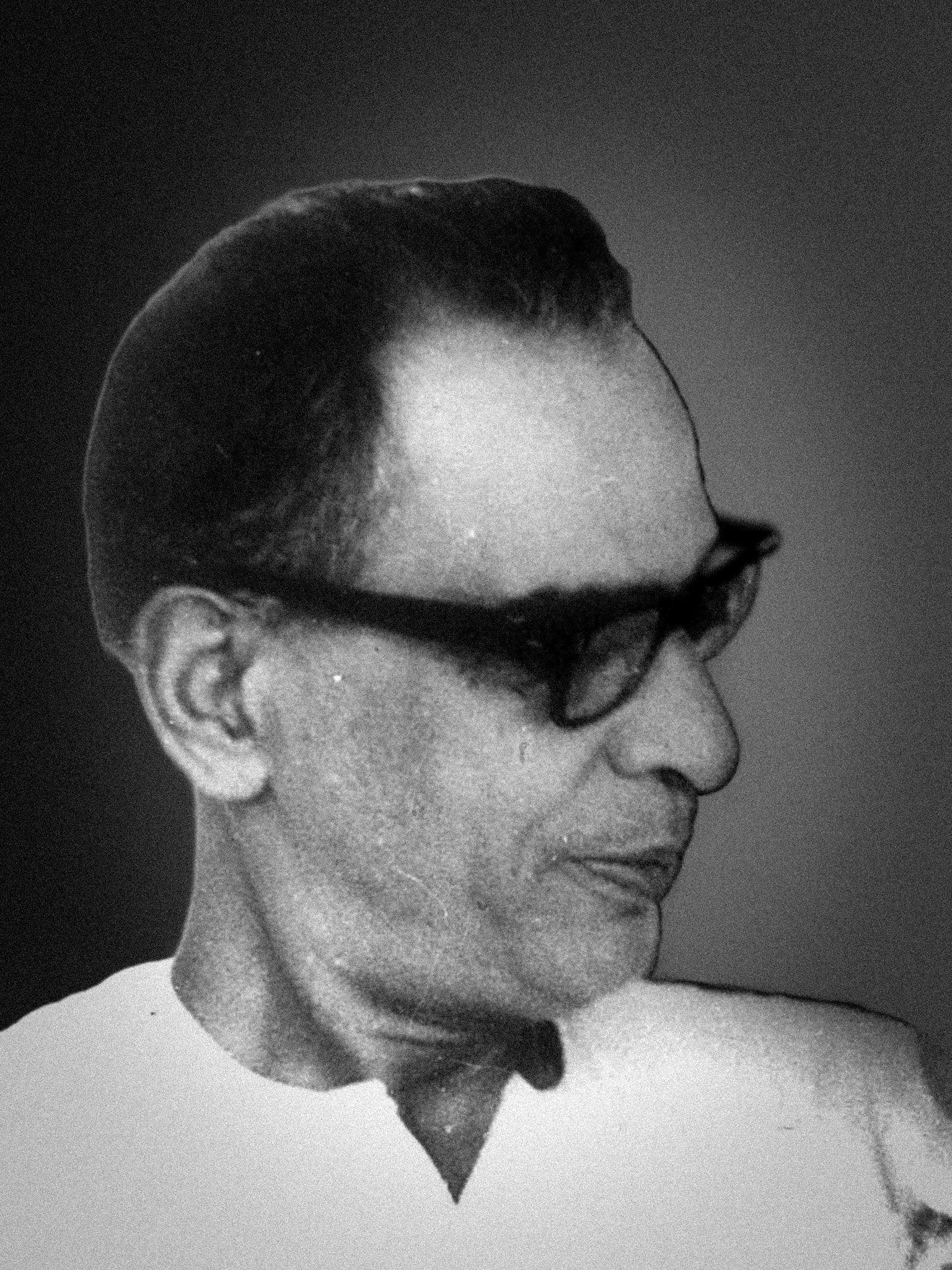
Konar in the 1960s

In the 1962 Sino-Indian War, again, Konar's strong neutrality toward China and India became a severe allegation of a Chinese agent and an anti-national. During his many speeches, he often praised the Communist revolution of the Chinese Communist Party, and these kinds of statements made him the face of an anti-nationalist by the Congress; nevertheless, when Konar was questioned whether he was actually a nationalist or not, he stated:

I was only 18 years old when I was deported to a cellular jail during the Indian Independence Movement, and I then dedicated my entire life to the working-class struggle. So asking me about nationalism or patriotism is a pointless topic for me.

According to Konar, believing in Humanity is more important than believing in the philosophy of Nationalism. He described nationalism as a word of urban elites and the aristocrats of society, who do not think anything about the working-class landless peasants of rural areas and the workers of a factory.

=== Communism ===
While in cellular jail, Konar was an avid reader of Mikhail Bakunin's teachings, as well as Karl Marx, Leo Tolstoy, Maxim Gorky, Nadezhda Krupskaya, and Clara Zetkin. He studied the histories of revolutionary movements in India, Europe, the Soviet Union, and beyond. Konar refers to Lenin as "A revolutionary of the modern world", and he has read the revolutionary ideas of Trotsky and Mazzini. Dr. Narayan Roy used to bring those books and allow young Konar to study them; later, Konar admitted that Dr. Narayan Roy and Satish Pakrashi were the driving forces behind the teaching of Communism and Socialism and their practical implementation in society. Actually, Dr. Roy taught Konar a valuable lesson during his time in jail; additionally, this man entirely transformed Konar's thinking from revolutionary intellectual to true communist who wants to fight for backward working-class people.

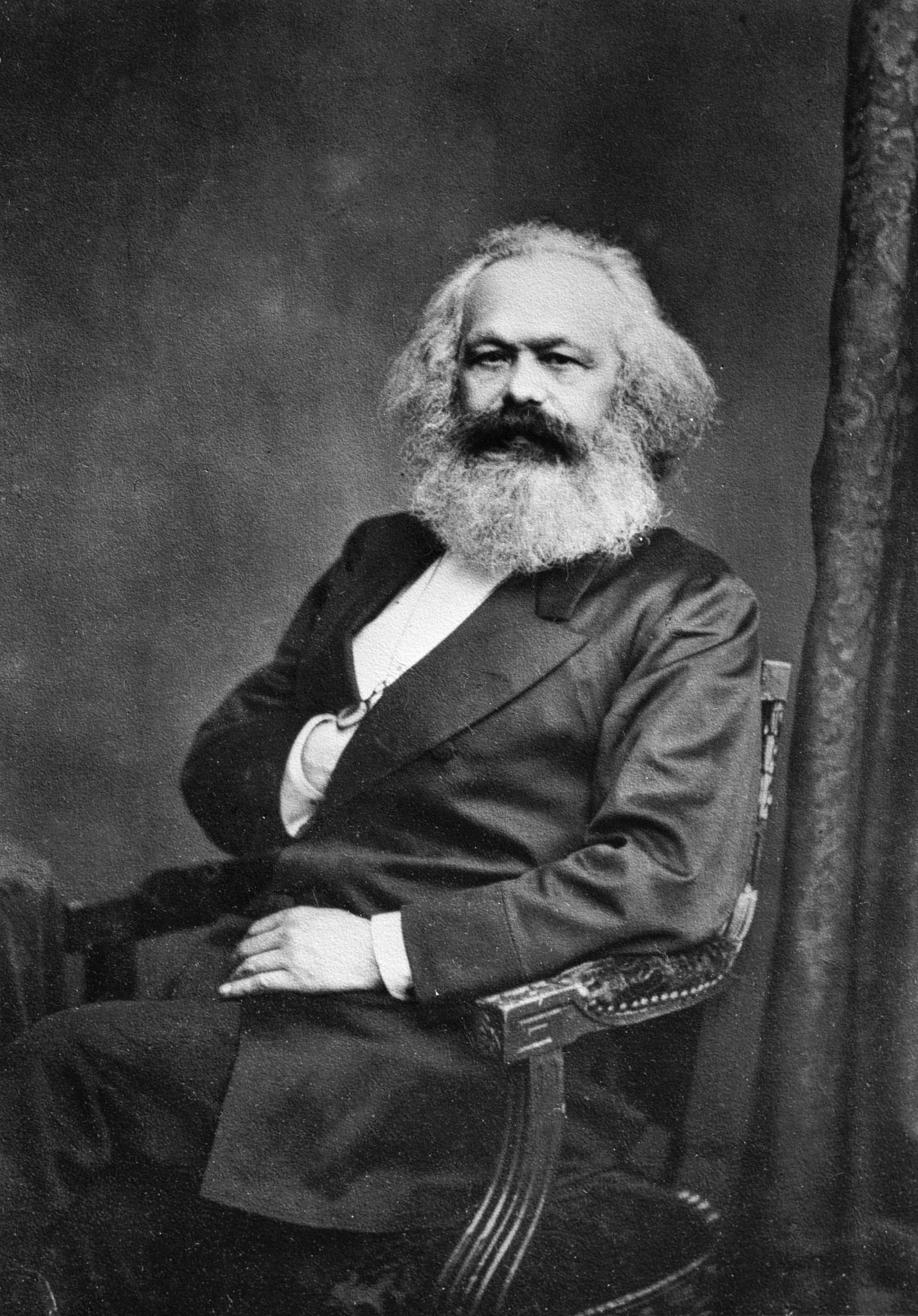
Hare Krishna Konar was influenced by the works of Karl Marx, in year 1934

After being released from jail in 1938, Konar joined India's mainstream communist movement, and during the 1964 split in the Communist Party of India, he stood for the leftist faction and became a founding member of the Communist Party of India (Marxist). Konar was a hardline believer in Karl Marx's social-political-economic philosophy, also known as Scientific socialism. According to Konar, scientific socialism deals with social, economic, and material phenomena by examining their historical trends through the use of the scientific method in order to derive probable outcomes and probable future developments, establishing seemingly rational propositions for organizing society and convincing others of their rationality or desirability. Konar sees social and political developments as being largely determined by economic conditions. Konar believes that social relations and notions of morality are context-based relative to their specific stage of economic development. He further noted that economic systems, socialism, and capitalism are not social constructs that can be established at any time based on the subjective will and desires of the population but instead are the products of social evolution. Konar described scientific socialism as a more practical-based theory that focuses on all aspects of land and other socioeconomic values in India, as well as the rural structure. Hence, his land reform effort followed the socialistic formula. He says towards this agrarian revolution that:

If the agrarian revolution in the villages does not continue, the People's Democratic Revolution will be just a distant memory. The agrarian revolution is the only driving force behind the People's Democratic Revolution.

According to Konar, fundamental land reform is impossible in this state structure. So the campaign began to seek as much legally feasible and fundamental land reform in the state of West Bengal. The liberation of the country sparked a new surge of activity in the struggle for the liberation of exploited people. Konar turned down any prospects for comfort in his personal life. He knew how to read the minds of the villagers; agriculture was their primary source of income, and he was well-versed in agricultural issues. And because of his remarkable oratory, exceptional ability to understand the mindset of rural India, desire to reform Indian agricultural beliefs, and positive impact on working-class people's mindsets. Even the Union Cabinet Ministers used to fear him on any form of agricultural disagreements and issues, including Ashok Mitra, the Chief Economic Advisor to the Government of India, who once said:

When Konar used to speak, I had no audacity to speak in front of him on any issue. He was my teacher, and I was his studious student.

Despite the differences in ideology, the Prime Minister of India and Congress leader, Indira Gandhi, maintained to seek advice from Konar on land-related decisions. Even Indira Gandhi once sent Konar to the Lal Bahadur Shastri National Academy of Administration to conduct a seminar with the professors, faculties, and students about land reform implementation and other agricultural difficulties.

== Positions held ==
Year	Description
1940–1955	Secretary of the Burdwan District Congress (1940); Member of the West Bengal State Council of the Communist Party of India (1953); Secretary of the West Bengal Provincial Kisan Sabha (1954); Member of the Central Council of All India Kisan Sabha (1954)
1955–1960	Member of the West Bengal State Secretariat of the Communist Party of India (1956); Elected to the 2nd West Bengal Legislative Assembly (1957); Member of the National Council of the Communist Party of India (1958)
1960–1965	Elected to the 3rd West Bengal Legislative Assembly (1962); Member of the Central Committee of the Communist Party of India (Marxist) (1964); Member of the West Bengal State Committee of the Communist Party of India (Marxist) (1964); Member of the West Bengal State Secretariat of the Communist Party of India (Marxist) (1964)
1965–1974	Elected to the 4th West Bengal Legislative Assembly (1967); Minister of Land & Land Revenue of West Bengal (1967); General Secretary of All India Kisan Sabha (1968); Elected to the 5th West Bengal Legislative Assembly (1969); Minister of Land & Land Revenue of West Bengal (1969); Elected to the 6th West Bengal Legislative Assembly (1971)

== Published books ==
- Pathera sandhāna
  (Published in 1976 by National Book Agency of India).
- Agrarian Problems of India
  (Published in 1977 by National Book Agency of India).
- Bhāratera kṛshi samasyā
  (Published in 1980 by National Book Agency of India and it is the Bengali version of Agrarian Problems of India is translated by Hare Krishna Konar).
- Selected Works of Hare Krishna Konar
  (Published in 1977 by National Book Agency of India and it is a selected articles, letters and political background of Hare Krishna Konar).

== Legacy ==
=== Recognition ===
There was a major argument between MP Basudeb Acharia and MPs of the Bharatiya Janata Party in the Indian Parliament in 2002 when Andaman's Port Blair Airport was decided to be renamed as Veer Savarkar International Airport over the argument that Savarkar was a fake nationalist who had submitted numerous mercy petitions to the British government, and as a result, the airport shouldn't be named after Savarkar. This airport should be named after India's topmost leader, Hare Krishna Konar, who spent a ridiculous amount of time there and later became a national communist leader, so this airport ought to be dedicated in his honor. Although Acharia's demands were later ignored by the BJP, and the airport was named after Savarkar.

The headquarters of the West Bengal Provincial Kisan Sabha in Sealdah, Kolkata, was named after Hare Krishna Konar as the "Harekrishna Konar Smriti Bhavan".

A bridge on the Damodar River in Purba Bardhaman district was named after Hare Krishna Konar as "Harekrishna Konar Setu".

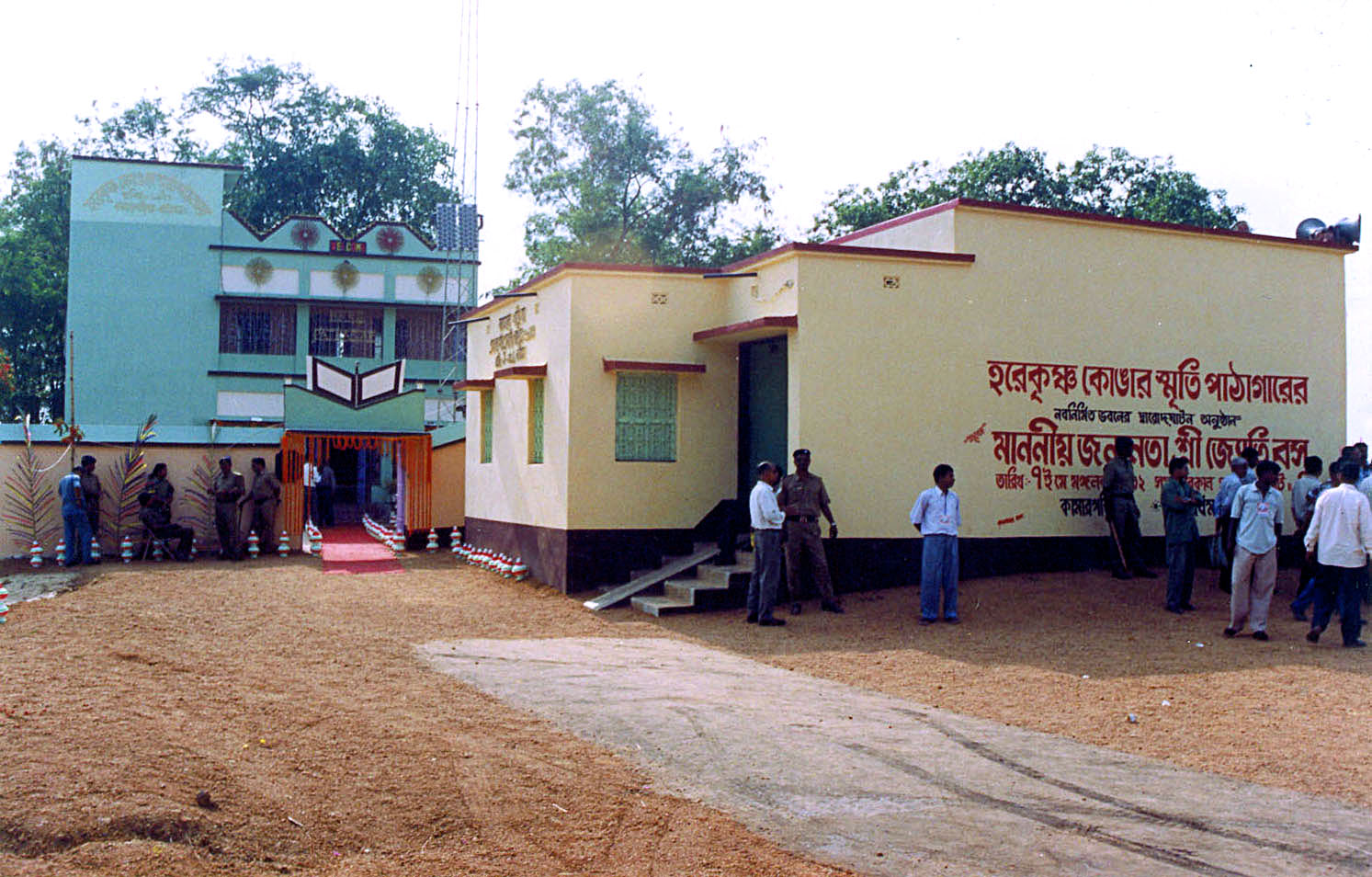
Harekrishna Konar Smriti Pathagar, the library in Kamargoria named after Konar

Three government libraries were named after Hare Krishna Konar as "Harekrishna Konar Smriti Pathagar": one in Natherdanga, Bankura district; one in Gangarampur, Dakshin Dinajpur district; and another one in his birthplace, Kamargoria, Purba Bardhaman district.

Many government schools have been named after him, such as "Hare Krishna Konar Smriti F P" in North 24 Parganas, "Harekrishna Konar Shiksha Niketan" in Purba Bardhaman, and many others in Purba Medinipur, Hooghly, Maldah, and Nadia.

Many streets have been named after Konar, such as "Hare Krishna Konar Road" in Kolkata, "Hare Krishna Konar Sarani" in Durgapur, and many others around West Bengal.

=== In popular culture ===
In 1979, the Department of Information & Cultural Affairs of the Government of West Bengal made a biographical documentary film named "Comrade Harekrishna Konar", which was produced by Gour Saha and the Harekrishna Konar Memorial Agrarian Research Centre. This documentary was screened several times in Kolkata and Delhi during various campaigns. The film covers Konar's childhood days, revolutionary life, and political career and also includes an interview video of revolutionary Ganesh Ghosh.

== See also ==
- List of political families
- List of people from West Bengal
- List of Indian independence activists
- Communist involvement in the Indian independence movement
