= Ministry of Land & Land Revenue (West Bengal) =

Indian state government department

Department overview
- Formed: 1 March 1967
- Dissolved: March 16, 1970
- Superseding Department: Ministry of Land & Land Reforms
- Jurisdiction: Government of West Bengal
- Headquarters: Writers' Building, Kolkata, West Bengal, India

The Department of Land & Land Revenue of West Bengal was a West Bengal government department. It was a ministry mainly responsible for the formulation of policies, acts, rules, and procedures relating to land matters, namely, land records and surveys, land revenue, land reforms, land use, and management of government lands.

== Ministry ==
The ministry also headed the department of requisition and acquisition of land as well as their implementation by way of preparation and revision of records of rights, including recording of sharecroppers (bargadars); vesting and distribution of ceiling surplus land; determination of the requirement of land by tea gardens, factories, etc.

== Ministerial history ==
On 1 March 1967, the United Front government was formed with Ajoy Mukherjee as its chief minister. At that time, the Department of Land & Land Revenue was formed, and Hare Krishna Konar held the ministry. Soon on 21 November 1967, the United Front government fell and President's rule was implemented, and again on 25 February 1969, the United Front government was formed, and again Hare Krishna Konar held the ministry, but again on 16 March 1970, the government fell and presidency rule was implemented.

This ministry was vacant until 1977. Following the 1977 West Bengal Legislative Assembly election, Left Front came to power, and the ministry was renamed to Ministry of Land & Land Reforms, with Benoy Choudhury as its charge.

== List of Ministers of Land & Land Revenue ==
No.	Name	Portrait	Term of office		Party	Chief Minister
1	Hare Krishna Konar		1 March 1967	21 November 1967	Communist Party of India (Marxist) (United Front)	Ajoy Mukherjee
–	Vacant	–	21 November 1967	25 February 1969	N/A	N/A
(1)	Hare Krishna Konar		25 February 1969	16 March 1970	Communist Party of India (Marxist) (United Front)	Ajoy Mukherjee

== See also ==
- Deputy Chief Minister of West Bengal
- Ministry of Information & Cultural Affairs (West Bengal)
- Ministry of Health & Family Welfare (West Bengal)
