= Sudhangshu Dasgupta =

Indian politician

- সুধাংশু দাশগুপ্ত
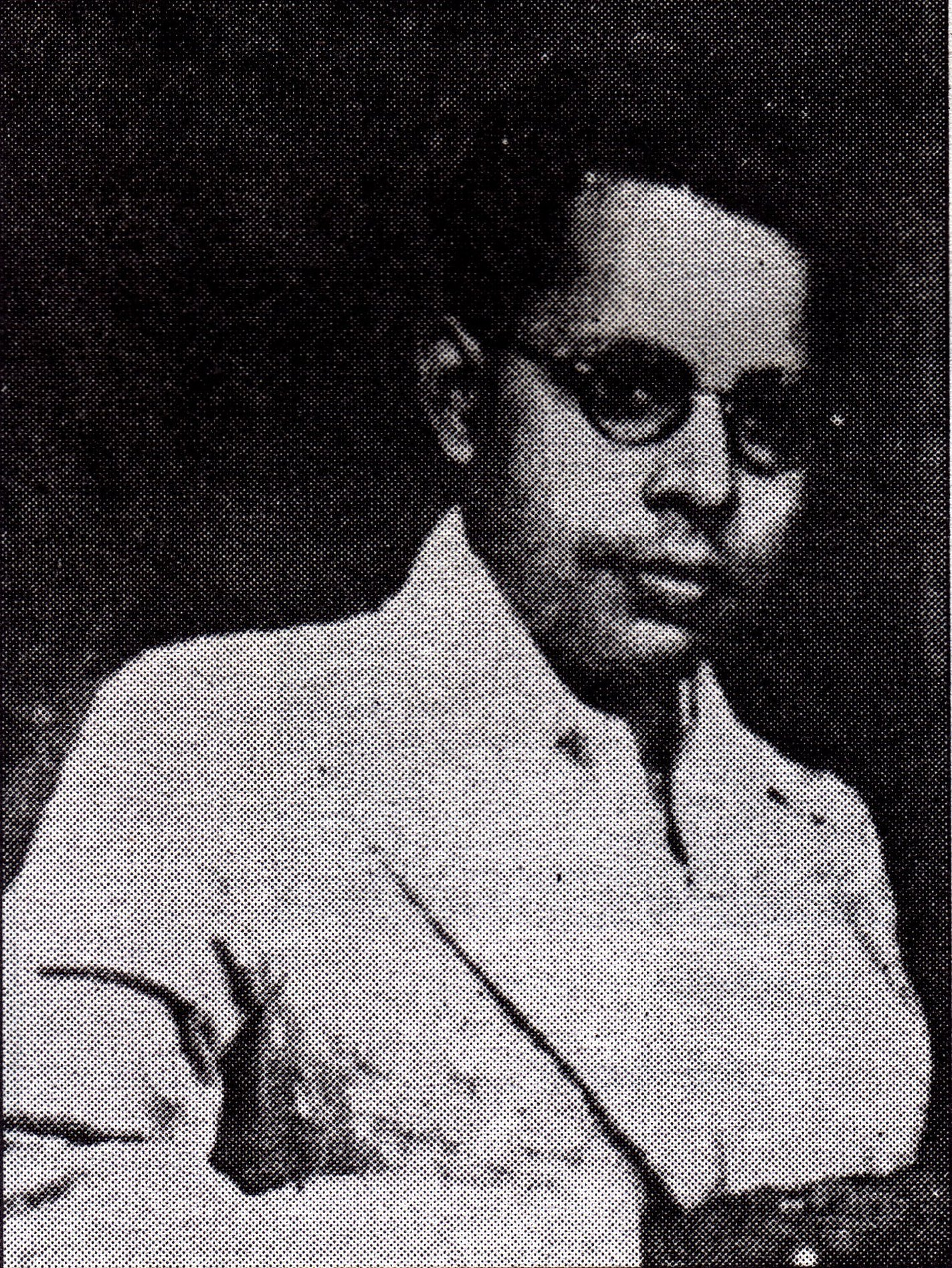
- Sudhangshu Dasgupta in 1938

Personal details
- Born: 30 January 1912 Barisal, British India (modern Bangladesh)
- Died: 10 May 2003 (aged 91) Kolkata, India
- Citizenship: India
- Party: Communist Party of India (1936 - 1964); Communist Party of India (Marxist) (1964 - 2003)

Sudhangshu Dasgupta (1912 – 2003) was an Indian communist and freedom fighter. He was a Communist Party of India (Marxist) leader and founder of the Desh Hitaishee, journal of West Bengal Communist Party. Dasgupta joined Communist Party of India in 1936.

== Early life and education ==
Dasgupta was born in Barishal on 30 January 1912. His father Motilal Dasgupta was an established kabiraj. He attended Banipith School in Barishal and passed Matriculation in 1927. He passed I. Sc. from Brojomohun College in 1929. He attended Carmichael Medical College (now called R. G. Kar Medical College) in Calcutta to study medicine. While in Calcutta, he joined the freedom struggle of India and was sent to Andaman Cellular Jail. After returning, he passed his BA and MA examinations in 1936 and 1938 from the University of Calcutta.

== Political career ==
In his student life, he joined the anti-imperialist struggle. He came in contact with Satish Pakrashi, Pannalal Dasgupta, Niranjan Sengupta. In 1930, in connection with the Mechuabazar Bomb Case, he and 23 others were arrested. In 1932, He was sent to the Andaman Cellular jail with other revolutionaries where he became acquainted with Communist ideas. He was one of the members of Communist Consolidation, an Indian communist organisation, founded by Hare Krishna Konar in 1935 among with the prisoners of Andaman Cellular Jail.

Dasgupta joined the Communist Party in 1936 and started working in the worker's movements. In 1939, when "Samne Chalo", the weekly mouthpiece of CPI was launched under the editorship of Abdul Halim, he became associated with it. He was associated with many magazines like "Janajuddha" (1942), "Swadhinata" (1945), "Crossroad" (1953).

He was the founder editor of the Desh Hitaishee, the ideological journal of the West Bengal state committee of the Party in 1963. He took a firm stand against revisionism and became a member of the CPI(M) state committee in 1964 and continued in that position till his death. He was also a member of the state secretariat for a period. He was also associated with "Ganashakti" in 1967.

He wrote numerous books on Marxism in Bengali including:

- "Marxbadi: Ki o keno?"
- "Communist Manifesto Prosongo"
- "Swadhinata sangrame soshostro biplobider bhumika"
- "Comrade, somoy kothay?"
- "Samajtantra Ke Keno Ebang Kon Pathey"

His wife was Communist leader Madhuri Devi. She died in 2013.
