= Department of Land & Land Reforms (West Bengal) =

Indian state government department

Land and Land Reforms and Refugee Relief and Rehabilitation Department
Department overview
- Jurisdiction: Government of West Bengal
- Headquarters: Writers' Building, Kolkata, West Bengal, India
- Minister responsible: Suvendu Adhikari
- Department executive: Vivek Kumar, IAS, Additional Chief Secretary
- Website: https://banglarbhumi.gov.in/

The Department of Land & Land Reforms & Refugee Relief & Rehabilitation of West Bengal is a West Bengal government department. It is a ministry mainly responsible for the formulation of policies, Acts, Rules and procedures relating to land matters, namely, land records and survey, land revenue, land reforms, land use and management of government lands.The Department is now focusing on and is committed to improve the citizen centric services such as mutation and conversion, issuance of plot information and certified copies of Record of rights (Khatian) etc.

== Ministry ==
The ministry also headed the department of requisition and acquisition of land as well as their implementation by way of preparation and revision of Records of right, including recording of sharecroppers (bargadars); vesting and distribution of ceiling surplus land; determination of the requirement of land by tea gardens, factories etc.; mutation of ownership and conversion of classification of land; assessment and collection of land revenue and cesses; requisition and acquisition of land. The ministerial team at the ministry is headed by the Cabinet Minister for Land & Land Reforms, who may or may not be supported by Ministers of State. Civil servants are assigned to them to manage the ministers' office and ministry.

== Administration of relevant laws and regulations ==
- West Bengal Premises Requisition and control (Temporary provision) Act, 1947
- West Bengal Non-Agricultural Tenancy Act, 1949
- West Bengal Estates Acquisition Act, 1953
- West Bengal Land Reforms Act, 1955
- West Bengal Bargadar Act 1956
- West Bengal Restoration of Alienated Land Act, 1973
- West Bengal Acquisition of Homestead Land Act, 1975
- Urban Land (Ceiling & Regulation) Act, 1976
- Calcutta Thika Tenancy (Acquisition & Regulation) Act, 1981
- West Bengal Land Reforms and Tenancy Tribunal Act, 1997
- West Bengal Premises Tenancy Act, 1997
- Kolkata Land Revenue Act, 2003

and their subsequent amendments done in the state legislature

== Ministerial history ==
Previously, Department of Land & Land Reforms Refugee Relief & Rehabilitation was known as Ministry of Land & Land Revenue. Hare Krishna Konar held the first position during the United Front rule from 1967 to 1970. After the 1977 West Bengal Legislative Assembly election, the title of the office was renamed to Ministry of Land & Land Reforms, and the Land Revenue department merged into this department and was held by Benoy Choudhury until his resignation in 1991. From 1991, Abdur Razzak Molla held this position till 2011. Mamata Banerjee held the position from 2011 till 9th May 2026.

== Offices, branches and directorates ==
- Refugee Relief and Rehabilitation Directorate
- Land Record and Survey Directorate
- Land Policy Branch
- Government Estate Management Branch
- Mines and Mineral Branch
- Requisition Branch
- Agricultural and Census Branch
- Survey and Settlement Branch
- Establishment Branch
- Law Branch
- Land Reforms Integrated Branch
- Land Acquisition and Collection Branch
- Rent Control Court Offices
- Howrah and Kolkata Thika Tenancy Controller Office
- Office of the Director of Land Records & Surveys, Indo-Bangladesh Boundary Demarcation
- State Land Use Board

== Departmental administrative set-up and Land Record and Survey Directorate ==
- Departmental Headquarters
  - Minister In-charge
  - Minister of State
  - Departmental Secretariat
    - Principal Secretary & Land Reforms Commissioner
    - Secretary
    - Additional Secretary / Special Secretary
    - Joint Secretary
  - Land Record and Survey Directorate
    - Director (Land Records and Survey) & Joint Land Reforms Commissioner
    - Additional Director (Land Records and Survey)
    - Joint Director (Land Records and Survey)
- District Set-Up
  - District Magistrate
  - Additional District Magistrate (Land Reforms) / District Land and Land Reforms Officer
  - Additional District Magistrate (Land Acquisition) / Special Land Acquisition Officer [Optional]
  - Additional District Magistrate (Compensation) [Optional]
- Sub Divisional Set-up
  - Sub Divisional Land and Land Reforms Officer
- Block Set-up
  - Block Land and Land Reforms Officer

== List of ministers of land & land reforms ==
No.	Name	Portrait	Term of office		Party	Chief Minister
1	Benoy Choudhury		21 June 1977	24 April 1991	Communist Party of India (Marxist)	Jyoti Basu
2	Abdur Razzak Molla		24 April 1991	6 November 2000	Communist Party of India (Marxist)	Jyoti Basu
2	Abdur Razzak Molla		6 November 2000	13 May 2011	Communist Party of India (Marxist)	Buddhadeb Bhattacharjee
3	Mamata Banerjee		13 May 2011	9 May 2026	Trinamool Congress	Herself

== See also ==
- Ministry of Health & Family Welfare (West Bengal)
- Ministry of Information & Cultural Affairs (West Bengal)
- Department of North Bengal Development
