= Operation Barga =

Land reform movement in West Bengal, India

Operation Barga was a land reform movement, throughout rural West Bengal for recording the names of sharecroppers (bargadars) while avoiding the time-consuming method of recording through the settlement machinery. It bestowed on the bargadars, the legal protection against eviction by the landlords (jotedars), and entitled them to the due share of the produce. Operation Barga was launched in 1978 and concluded by the mid-1980s. Introduced in 1978, and given legal backing in 1979 and 1980, Operation Barga became a popular but controversial measure for land reforms. The ultimate aim of these land reforms was to facilitate the conversion of the state's bargadars into landowners, in line with the Directive Principles of State Policy of the Indian Constitution. To date, Op Barga has recorded the names of approximately 1.5 million bargadars. Since then, it has been marked as one of the most successful land reforms programs in India.

== Background ==
The Land Reforms Act of India (1955) and its subsequent amendments stated that all sharecroppers would have permanent use rights on land that they had leased and that such rights would be inheritable. Such incumbency rights could be claimed as long as sharecroppers paid the legal share of the crop to their landlords or did not leave the land uncultivated or unless the landlords wished to take back the land for personal cultivation.

However, landlords routinely used the personal cultivation clause to evict tenants. There was another major barrier. A tenant would have to formally register his status (as a tenant) with the government. But few tenants registered, faced as they were with potential intimidation from their landlords, the removal of other forms of support such as consumption credit, and the prospect of a long and arduous legal battle if they truly wanted to dispute an eviction. Given this imbalance, landlords regularly exploited their tenants, either evicting them just before the harvest season, or giving them a lower share of the produce than they were entitled to, or refusing to give loans or charging extremely high rates of interest on loans taken for agricultural investments by the bargadar.

Enumeration of the sharecroppers and legal recording of their tenancy would have provided them with protection from eviction and exploitation under the existing laws itself. However, most bargadars did not know their rights under these laws, and, given their financial status, they were financially dependent on their landlords. Additionally, the long and tedious recording process, and the fear of reprisals by the landlords meant that most bargadars did not record their names. Recording drives before Operation Barga had managed to record only 400,000, out of the estimated total of 2.2-2.5 million bargadars.

== History ==
Previously operation barga was known as Land Reform and India's first legally and practically successful land reform was also done in West Bengal on year 1967 after United Front came into power and that movement was led by two CPI(M) leader Hare Krishna Konar and Benoy Choudhury but soon United Front loss its power on year 1970, then for 7 years Land Reform was abolished and after the Left Front came into power in West Bengal on 1977 as the ruling state government. In existing tenant laws they found possibilities to advance their agenda of agrarian reform. The Left Front carried out a two-pronged attack. It took the no-cultivation clause seriously and closed off this loophole. Simultaneously, it encouraged the registration of tenants through the much publicized Operation Barga.

In June 1978, based on discussions held during a workshop on Land Reforms, the West Bengal government launched Operation Barga. This was given legal backing through the Bengal Land Holding Revenue Act, 1979 and the Revenue Rules of 1980. In 1981 the West Bengal Government passed a law to remove the exemptions given to orchards, plantations, fisheries and religious trusts from the purview of the land reforms (However, it took many years for this legislation to receive the approval of the Central Government).

Operation Barga aimed to record the names of the sharecroppers (Bargadars), who formed a major part of the agrarian population in West Bengal and to educate them about their cultivation rights. Operation Barga depended heavily on collective action by the sharecroppers and was qualitatively different from the traditional Revenue Court approach, which was biased in favour of the richer and more influential landowners.

The enumeration and recording of Sharecroppers and educating them about their rights was an important step in raising their economic and social status. By giving these farmers more rights, and protecting them from exploitation by the landowners, they were assured of a relatively stable livelihood, which would improve their living standards as well, and give them an opportunity to become landowners themselves.

While Operation Barga did not directly attempt to turn the bargadars into landowners, the legislation included two provisions intended to facilitate that conversion. Firstly, the legislation gave bargadars priority rights to purchase the barga land if the landlord decided to sell it. Secondly, the legislation authorized the state government to establish a "land corporation" that would advance funds to bargadars to purchase barga land using this priority right. The second provision has not yet been implemented due to lack of funding.

== Implementation ==
To implement Operation Barga, the government adopted the principle of people's participation in land reforms, and collective action by the stakeholders. This movement was launched with the active assistance of not only the bargadars themselves but also of rural workers' organizations and self-governing institutions. The operation was divided into the following five distinct steps:

1. Identification of the priority pockets with large concentration of bargadars.
2. Camping by the Government Officials at the priority pockets.
3. Meeting between the bargadars and the government officials.
4. The collective participation of the villagers in the reconnaissance and field verification to establish the claims of sharecroppers.
5. Issue of temporary certificates called 'parchas' to confirm sharecroppers as evidence of their rights enabling them to obtain bank credit.

To begin with, group meetings between Officials and Bargadars were organized during "settlement camps" (also called "Reorientation camps"), where the bargadars could discuss their grievances. The first such camp was held at Halusai in Polba taluk in Hooghly district from 18 to 20 May 1978.

These camps gave the land officials an opportunity to educate the bargadars and other landless farmers of their rights. The participants in these camps would be about 30-40 poor farmers, the landowners, and about 10-15 land officials at the field level, such as junior land reforms officers, "kanungos", and agricultural extension officers. Each camp would last for around 3 days, with the officials staying on site during the duration. Wide publicity would be given for these camps by the beating of drums, distribution of leaflets, and personal advertising by the officials and local farmer groups. Based on feedback after the camp, changes to the working of these camps would be introduced.

During the camps, the various stakeholders would meet with the land officials and discuss their issues. A list of claimants would be drawn up immediately after, and publicly verified in the presence of the landholders, who could then record their objections. Then, the names of the bargadars would be recorded on the spot, and all legal documents would be issued and distributed immediately.

There was initially some violence during the first year of the programme, where landowners manhandled some officials and harassed bargadars who came forward to record their names. However, with increased governmental and collective support, these incidents reduced. The peasant organizations of the ruling political parties worked along with village-level administration to encourage registration. This thwarted the collusion between landlords and local officials and prevented intimidation. "Settlement camps," which were already being used by land reform officials to maintain and update land records, were actively used as tools of registration. Registration certificates were issued on the spot.

Bureaucratic red-tapism was removed to a large extent under this operation, since it was one of the major reasons for low recording of bargadars. Over 8000 awareness camps were organized throughout the state between 1978 and June 1982, which resulted in the registration of over 675,000 sharecroppers.

== Impact ==
The launch of Operation Barga and the legal amendments introduced changed the landlord-bargadar relationship in two fundamental ways. First, through anti-eviction measures, the landlords were largely prevented from forcibly throwing the bargadars off the land. In fact, the bargadar rights were made hereditary and thus perpetual. Second, the state guaranteed that the bargadars would receive a fair share of the crop (75 per cent if the bargadar provided the non-labour inputs and 50 per cent if the landlord provides those inputs). This prevented exploitation of the sharecroppers by the landowners.

The 1979 amendment was considered as a radical departure in clinching the issue of Bargadari settlement on a judicial basis. Previously it was almost impossible for a tenant to prove his tenancy rights legally owing to the judicial and administrative red-tapism. But in the new amendments, the responsibility of disproving a claim to bagadari rights was squarely put on the landowners. Self-Cultivation was defined as cultivation on the basis of physical participation by members of the landowner's family and resumption of land under self-cultivation were made under many stringent conditions.

While land reform have generally made little headway in most of India, West Bengal has been an exception. In all, approximately half of rural households in West Bengal have received land reform benefits. In the 20-year period after setting land reforms in place, agricultural growth in West Bengal skyrocketed. More important, rural poverty declined sharply and both food intake and wages in the countryside increased significantly. Operation Barga formed a major part of this success. Progress has occurred in three areas:

1. Regulating sharecropping relationships (Operation Barga)
2. Redistributing ceiling-surplus lands in ownership (Land-ceiling Act)
3. Distributing homestead plots

An empirical analysis of the impact of Operation Barga on agricultural production, productivity, employment, income including its distribution and on the qualitative improvement in the utilization of barga land was conducted during the period 1986–88 in the three districts of Birbhum, Burdwan and Jalpaiguri in West Bengal.

== Success ==
Operation Barga was successful in enumerating the Bargadars. Over the period 1977–90, the fraction of registered sharecroppers rose from 23 to 65%. During the same period of time in West Bengal, there was expansion in public and private irrigation and there was technological change as well. These reforms, along with the guaranteed crop share and bargadar's increased stake in the land led to an increase in agricultural output. A sample survey by Banerjee and Ghatak [1996] estimated that Operation Barga accounted for about 36% of total growth in agricultural production during this period, a significant fraction. The survey noted that while only 10% of all tenants had output shares that exceeded 50% in the pre-reform period. Post-reform, about half of all registered tenants and even a quarter of all unregistered tenants had shares that exceeded 50%.

By the end of 1982 about 1.2 million sharecroppers were recorded, out of the total estimated number of about 2.0-3.5 millions. By the end of June 1994 around 1460,000 bargadars had been recorded over an area of over 451,800 hectares. The most remarkable achievement of the programme, as reported in the 1986-88 study, was that it enhanced social status of the bargadars and security of tenancy.

The change in the tenancy condition in the state through Operation Barga has brought some degree of economic stability among farmers. Unlike in other Indian states, West Bengal has hardly seen any farmer suicides or starvation deaths arising from crop failure. Operation Barga and the distribution of surplus land among the marginal, poor and backward castes have created a cushion against farmers committing suicide because of the fear of money lenders or landlords taking away all the produce.

== Criticism ==
Operation Barga (and West Bengal's land reforms in general) have been criticized for their small scope and inability to solve all the major problems. This criticism has been mainly due to policies not accounting for the high population-to-landmass ratio in Bengal (the highest in the country), the small and highly segregated land holding patterns and failure of the Government to develop agri-industrial markets for farm produce. These failures, critics contend, have distributed poverty rather than creating prosperity. They point out that in spite of these measures, Bengal's agricultural infrastructure and financial situation is no better than in most other states.

The analysis of Op Barga carried out in 1986–88 in the 3 districts mentioned above concluded that Operation Barga, while partly successful in bringing about a change in the tenancy pattern, did not succeed in augmenting production and productivity on the barga land where the bargadars had been receiving the stipulated crop share. Furthermore, entrepreneurship continue to remain low because of the inherent conflict of interest in crop sharing mechanism coupled with the fact that the bargadars were not adequately trained in this area.

The study also noted that the unsatisfactory performance of these bargadars (even those who received their crop share as stipulated in the Act) was due to their poor resource base and lack of access to modern technology and to capital market with the resultant inability to acquire material resources. Moreover, the imperfections in input markets also generally contributed to the poor performance of the bargadars. Operation Barga was also criticized for being anti-landowner, and providing some draconian measures that could be misused.

Additionally, there are recent reports that have indicated that the success of Operation Barga has not continued after its demise. The National Sample Survey (NSS) data of 1999 has reported that only 30.6 per cent of all sharecroppers were registered, and that there was a "distinct class bias". Such a class bias, and the involvement of only the more influential among the agricultural class, has led to a creation of "rural rich", while the poorer sections and backward castes have been comparatively marginalized in terms of effectiveness of this program. Studies have also noted that the landlords continued to own the largest holdings in the villages and the value of their holdings increased substantially.

In 2003, a comprehensive survey by the West Bengal State Institute of Panchayats & Rural Development (SIPRD) warned that as much as 14.37 per cent of registered bargadars had been dispossessed of their barga land, 26.28 per cent were suffering from a sense of insecurity that they might lose it in the near future, and 13.23 per cent of pattadars had also been alienated of the land they had received. For example, in Singur, during the protests against the Tata Nano car project, the West Bengal government Status Report noted that for 37 registered bargadars in the 997-acre (4.03 km^{2}) project area there were 170 unregistered ones.

== Restarting in 2008 ==
In the face of criticisms of land reforms after Op Barga and their lack of success, along with the diminishing bargadar list, the West Bengal government announced in October 2008 that it would re-launch Operation Barga. This was reportedly an effort by the CPI(M) government to woo rural voters before the Panchayat elections (which the CPI(M) subsequently lost). Land Reforms Minister Abdul Rezzak Molla admitted in the state assembly that about 20-27% of bargadars had lost their recorded rights as sharecroppers.
