= Kamargoria =

- Village
- Location in West Bengal, India Kamargoria (India)
- Coordinates: 23.02°N 87.93°E
- Country: India
- District: Purba Bardhaman district
- State: West Bengal

Government
  - Type: Panchayat

Population (2011)
  - Total: 3,366
- Time zone: UTC+5:30 (Indian Standard Time)
- PIN: 713408
- Telephone/STD code: 0321036
- Lok Sabha constituency: Bardhaman Purba
- Vidhan Sabha constituency: Raina
- Website: purbabardhaman.gov.in

Kamargoria is a village in Raina II CD Block in Bardhaman Sadar South subdivision of Purba Bardhaman district in the Indian state of West Bengal.

== Demographics ==
As of 2011, Kamargoria hosts 735 families. The population numbers 3,366, of which 1,741 are males while 1,625 are females.

The population of children with age 0-6 is 344, comprising 10.22% of the total. The female sex ratio is 933, which is lower than West Bengal state average of 950. The child sex ratio is 944, which is lower than West Bengal average of 956.

In 2011, the literacy rate was 77.93% compared to 76.26% of West Bengal. Male literacy stands at 83.06% while female literacy was 72.43%.

Particulars	Total	Male	Female
Households	735	-	-
Population	3,366	1,741	1,625
Child (0-6)	344	177	167
Schedule Caste	989	514	475
Scheduled Tribe	0	0	0
Literacy	77.93%	83.06%	72.43%
Workers	1,166	1,052	114

=== Castes ===
Kamargoria village has substantial population of Scheduled Castes constituting 29.38% of the population. No members of Scheduled Tribe live there.

== Economy ==
As of 2011, 1,166 people engaged in working activities. 92.54% of workers describe their work as their main work (employment or earning for more than 6 months/year) while 7.46% were involved in marginal activities (employment or earning for less than 6 months). 355 were cultivators (owner or co-owner) while 402 were agricultural labourers.

== Administration ==
As per the Constitution of India and Panchayati Raj Act, Kamargoria village is administrated by a Sarpanch (Head of the Panchayat) who is the leader of all the elected representatives of village.

== Climate ==
Kamargoria

Climate chart (precipitation, max. and min. temperature)
J	F	M	A	M	J	J	A	S	O	N	D
14 26 13	17 29 15	21 34 20	30 38 24	70 35 26	201 35 26	274 36 24	262 32 29	234 32 26	86 32 23	17 29 17	2 26 13
- █ Average max. and min. temperatures in °C
- █ Precipitation totals in mm
- Source: http://en.climate-data.org/location/174026/
Imperial conversion
J	F	M	A	M	J	J	A	S	O	N	D
0.6 79 55	0.7 84 59	0.8 93 68	1.2 100 75	2.8 95 79	7.9 95 79	11 97 75	10 90 84	9.2 90 79	3.4 90 73	0.7 84 63	0.1 79 55
- █ Average max. and min. temperatures in °F
- █ Precipitation totals in inches

Kamargoria's climate is classified as tropical. In winter, rainfall is much less than in summer. According to Köppen and Geiger, this climate is classified as Aw. The temperature averages 26.5 °C. The average rainfall is 1228 mm.

Climate data for Kamargoria
Month	Jan	Feb	Mar	Apr	May	Jun	Jul	Aug	Sep	Oct	Nov	Dec	Year
Mean daily maximum °C (°F)	26.3 (79.3)	28.8 (83.8)	34.4 (93.9)	37.9 (100.2)	34.6 (94.3)	35.1 (95.2)	32.0 (89.6)	32.0 (89.6)	32.3 (90.1)	31.6 (88.9)	28.9 (84.0)	26.2 (79.2)	31.7 (89.0)
Mean daily minimum °C (°F)	12.6 (54.7)	15.0 (59.0)	20.0 (68.0)	24.3 (75.7)	25.8 (78.4)	26.2 (79.2)	25.7 (78.3)	25.8 (78.4)	25.7 (78.3)	23.4 (74.1)	17.5 (63.5)	13.3 (55.9)	21.3 (70.3)
Average precipitation mm (inches)	14 (0.6)	17 (0.7)	21 (0.8)	30 (1.2)	70 (2.8)	201 (7.9)	274 (10.8)	262 (10.3)	234 (9.2)	86 (3.4)	17 (0.7)	2 (0.1)	1,228 (48.5)
Source: Climate-data.org

== Notables ==
- Hare Krishna Konar, Indian revolutionary and politician
- Dasarathi Tah, Indian politician

== Education ==
Hare Krishna Konar Smriti patagar is one of the prominent library of West Bengal is in this village only. Kamargoria Rashbehari Basu Shikshaniketan is a co-educational high school affiliated with the West Bengal Council of Higher Secondary Education.
