= Thakur Ram Singh (revolutionary) =

Thakur Ram Singh (1911–2009) was an Indian Communist revolutionary and associate of Bhagat Singh. He started his political life as an Indian National Congress activist but was attracted towards the ideals of Bhagat Singh and his Hindustan Socialist Republican Army. Thakur Ram singh was sentenced to life imprisonment in Andaman Nicobar's Cellular Jail for his role in the Dogra shooting case of Ajmer. Inside the jail he formed a 'Communist Bloc', and later on after his release from the Andamans he joined the Communist Party of India. During the days of the Sino-Indian War he supported the split in the communist movement and was the founding member of the Communist Party of India (Marxist) Uttar Pradesh Committee.
