= Benoy Choudhury =

Indian politician (1911–2000)

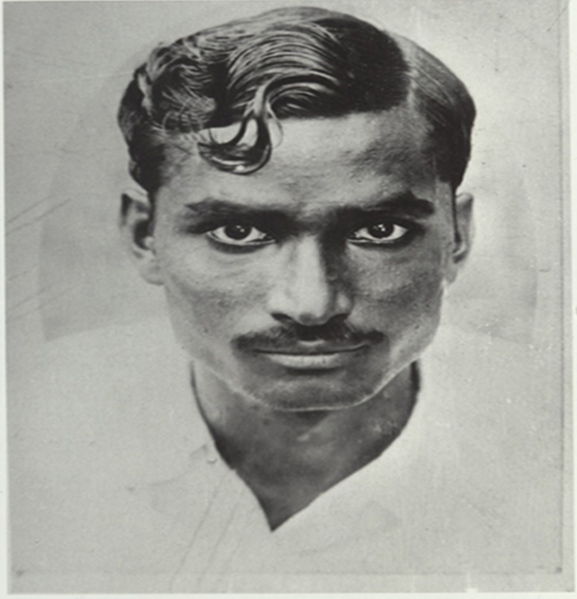

MLA, Minister, Land Reforms Pioneer
- In office 1952–1962, 1969–1972, 1987–1996
- Constituency: Bardhaman, Bardhaman South, Bardhaman North

Personal details
- Born: 16 January 1911 Sutra, Monteswer, Bengal Presidency, British India
- Died: 6 May 2000 (aged 89) Kolkata, West Bengal
- Party: CPI(M)

Benoy Choudhury (14 January 1911 – 6 May 2000) was an Indian revolutionary freedom fighter and politician, belonging to the CPI(M), who played a major role in land reforms in the Indian state of West Bengal.

== Early life ==
He was From a Mahishya family, He passed matriculation from Burdwan Municipal High School and Intermediate in Science from Serampore College, under the University of Calcutta. As a student at the age of thirteen, Chowdhury joined the Indian freedom movement, joining the Indian National Congress party in 1924 along with his friend Saroj Mukherjee. He joined the Jugantar group in 1928 and was in jail before he could sit for his B.A. examination. While studying in Serampore College, he and Saroj Mukherjee became acquainted with Dr. Bhupendranath Datta and Communist leaders Muzaffar Ahmed and Abdul Halim.

== Active in politics ==
In 1930 he was sent to jail for his activities with Anushilan Samiti. Again in 1938 he was jailed for his involvement in Birbhum conspiracy case. He joined the Communist Party in 1938.

== Elections ==
He filed his nomination for election from Burdwan constituency in 1951 while still in jail. Benoy Choudhury representing undivided CPI secured 11,439 votes, Uday Chand Mahtab, the erstwhile Maharaja of Burdwan, representing Congress secured 9,477 votes. Thereafter, he went on to win the Burdwan seat in 1957, and then the Burdwan South seat in 1969 and 1971. He won from the Bardhaman North seat in 1987 and 1991. He was minister of different departments.

== Land reforms ==
Benoy Choudhury played a leading role in land reforms in West Bengal. Land reforms can be divided into two phases. In the first phase in 1967–1970, Hare Krishna Konar recovered around a million acres (4,000 km^{2}) of land through existing legal means. In the second phase of land reforms in 1978–1982, Benoy Choudhury accomplished two major tasks. The first task was carried out under Operation Barga when around 1.7 million sharecroppers were formally recorded, assuring them of permanency of land holding and a fair share of the crop. The second task was the distribution of about a million acres (4,000 km^{2}) of land earlier vested amongst 2.4 million poor and landless farm labor. Thus about 4 million people were directly benefited, laying the foundation for victory of the Left Front in subsequent years.

== Later life ==
After retirement from active politics, Choudhury lived in a small rented flat in Bidhannagar, trying to make a living on the spouse's pension he received from his dead wife's account. She had been the headmistress of a school. After his death, one obituary note read, "A poor man he had nothing to bequeath so he gave his eyes to the eye bank and his body to Calcutta Medical College for research".
