= Communist movements in India =

Communist movements in India refers to the various social and political movements led by communists in India. Communism in India has existed since the 1920s. Some of the major events are listed below.

== Peasant movements ==
Communists were actively involved in various movements from the 1920s. The All India Kisan Sabha (AIKS) was founded in 1936, whose members were mostly communists. By 1942, AIKS and communists dominated the peasant movement in the country. This created a political and social base for communists among the peasants of India. Sahajanand Saraswati, Karyanand Sharma, and Bhogendra Jha were the most notable leaders of the movement. Afterwards, communism spread through other movements, such as the Bakasht movement (1946–1952), Madhubani movement, and Darbhanga movement.

=== Telangana armed struggle (1946-51) ===
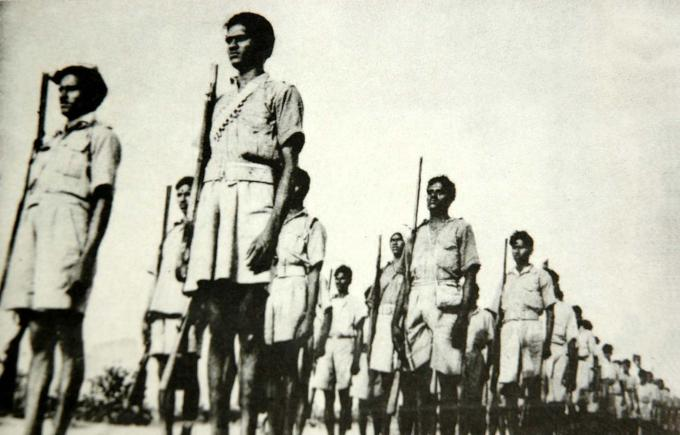
The Telangana armed struggle (1946–1951) was a peasant rebellion by communists against the feudal lords of the Telangana region in the princely state of Hyderabad.

During the 1920s and the early 1930s, the Communist Party existed, but was poorly organised, and in practice, several communist groups worked with limited national coordination. The British colonial authorities had banned all communist activity, which made the task of building a united party very difficult. A Communist Group was founded in Tashkent on 17 October 1920, soon after the Second Congress of the Communist International by M.N. Roy. Roy made contacts with Anushilan and Jugantar groups in Bengal. Small communist groups were formed in Bombay (led by S.A. Dange), Madras (led by Singaravelu Chettiar), the United Provinces (led by Shaukat Usmani), Punjab, Sindh (led by Ghulam Hussain), and Bengal (led by Muzaffar Ahmed).

=== Tebhaga Movement (1946-1950) ===
During 1946, sharecroppers had contracted to give half of their harvest to the landlords. Soon, sharecroppers began to assert that they would pay only one-third and that before division, the crop would stay in their godowns and not that of the Jotedars. In September 1946, Bangiya Pradeshik Kisan Sabha decided to launch the Tebhaga movement. The peasant movement led by Communist Party of India broke out in Kakdwip, Sonarpur, Bhangar and Canning. In many areas the agitations turned violent, and landlords fled, leaving parts of the countryside in the hands of Kisan Sabha. The movement resulted in clashes between Jotedars and Bargadars (sharecroppers). "Tebhaga" meantime one third portion of the whole. The prominent leaders of the movement were Kansari Halder, Ganesh Das, Ashok Bose and Rash Behari Ghosh. Peasant leaders like Gajen Malik, Manik Hazra, Jatin Maity, Bijoy Mondal and others rose to prominence. The movement continued till 1950, when the Bargadari Act was enacted.

=== Farmer's movements in Rajasthan ===
Communists, or more precisely, the Communist Party of India (Marxist), have organised multiple farmer's protests in Rajasthan. In 2000, the Kisan Sabha laid siege to the Rajasthan Legislative Assembly and demanded an increase in the number of hours they were supplied with power each day. In 2004, the CPI(M) started a movement in the Shri Gangangar district, bordering the Shekhawati region, against the reduction in their water allowance from the Indira Gandhi Canal. This resulted in the death of four farmers, as the Rajasthan Police opened fire on the agitating farmers. The government had to agree to increase the water allowance. In 2005, CPI(M) again agitated against a hike in electricity tariffs, by conducting sit-in in state capital, Jaipur, which resulted in a decrease of tariffs.

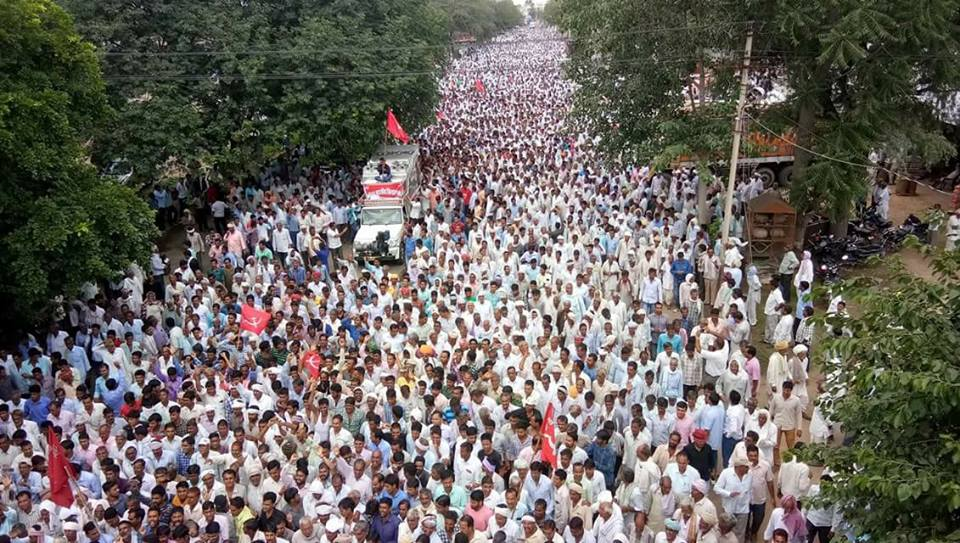
Sikar Kisan Andolan 2017

A large farmer's movement started in Rajasthan on 1 September 2017 to promote farmer's loan waivers, minimum support price and other demands under the leadership of Akhil Bhartiya Kishan Sabha (AIKS). Kisan Sabha president Amra Ram, Former MLA Pema Ram, Hetram Benwal, Pawan Duggal, Mangal Singh Yadav, Bhagirath Netar, Sagar Mal Khachariya, and others led the movement. Sikar was at the center of movement, so it is known as "Sikar Kisan Andolan". Thousands of farmers gathered in Sikar Mandhi on 1 September, and said their Padav would continue until demands were accepted. Kishan Padav (Hindi: किसान पड़ाव) continued in Sikar and Other Districts including Bikaner, Nagaur, Jhunjhunu, Churu, Hanumangarh, Shri Ganganagar, Alwar till 10 September. During this, government imposed Section 144 and also blocked Internet services in Sikar. When the demands were not accepted, on 10 September, AIKS called a statewide indefinite highway strike. The movement spread throughout Rajasthan, and impacted 14 districts. Traders and many organizations supported the Farmer's Movement. On 11th day, on the call of the Kisan Sabha, the farmers blocked highways and all other major and minor roads. Then the government invited the delegation of farmers for the talks on 11 September. After 2 days long talk, the government buckled on the night of the 13 September and accepted the demand of farmers. The movement was withdrawn after the demands were accepted.

== Left-wing movements in Manipur (1940-1951) ==
In jail, Irabot Singh met Indian communist leaders like Hemanga Biswas and Jyotirmoy Nandi. He was greatly influenced by them.

Irabot was finally permitted to enter Manipur in March 1946. In Manipur, he organised a new party, called the Manipur Praja Mandal in April 1946. He attended two sessions of the Nikhil Manipuri Mahasabha before he was expelled from the membership of the Working Committee of the Mahasabha on the charge of being a member of the Communist Party of India. He attended the second congress of the CPI held at Calcutta from 28 Feb to 6 March 1948.

Irabot could not attend the first meeting of the Manipur Legislative Assembly held on 18 October 1948 because of the warrant against him. Irabot formed an underground Communist Party of Manipur on 29 October 1948 and carried out armed struggle against the government. He died on 26 September 1951 at the foothills of the Anggo Hills.

== Participation in Goa Liberation movement (1954-1961) ==
During Satyagraha Movement in Goa, the Communist Party of India decided to send batches of satyahrahis since the middle of 1955 to the borders of Goa and even inside. Countrywide lists of satyagrahis were prepared, who were then sent to Goa borders in a series of memorable satyagrahas, which has few parallels in history. Batches after batches defied the Portuguese police and military, entered the borders of Goa, raised the Indian tricolour, and were fired upon and lathi-charged brutally. Many were killed, many more others arrested and sent to jails inside Goa and inhumanly treated. Many others were even sent to jails in Portugal and were brutally tortured.
