= Satish Pakrashi =

Indian communist revolutionary and freedom fighter

Satish Chandra Pakrashi

Member of the Communist Party of India (Marxist), West Bengal
- In office 7 November 1964 – 30 December 1973

Member of the West Bengal Legislative Council
- In office 1957–1963

Personal details
- Born: December 1893 Madhavdihi, Dacca District, Bengal Presidency, British India
- Died: 30 December 1973 (aged 79–80) Kolkata, West Bengal, India
- Party: Communist Party of India (Marxist) (1964–1973); Communist Party of India (1938–1964)
- Known for: Anushilan Samiti

Satish Chandra Pakrashi (December 1893 – 30 December 1973) was an Indian communist revolutionary and freedom fighter. He was a member of the West Bengal Legislative Council and a veteran leader of the Communist Party of India (Marxist).

== Early life and death ==
Satish Chandra Pakrashi was born in December 1893 in Madhavdihi village of Dacca, Bengal Presidency (modern day Bangladesh). His father's name was Jagadishchandra Pakrashi, and his mother's name was Mrinalini Pakrashi.

Pakrashi was died in Calcutta Hospital on 31 December 1973, for protacted illness.

== Political career ==
He was a member of the West Bengal Legislative Council for six years.

On 19 December 1929 Satish with others were arrested by british forces for planning armed uprising against the British colonial regime in India and was sentenced for 7 years in Cellular Jail. He was later he was released in 1938.
