= Vishwanath Vaishampayan =

Indian revolutionary (b. 1910 d. 1967)

- Born: 28 November 1910; Banda, United Provinces, British India
- Died: 20 October 1967 (aged 56)

Vishwanath Vaishampayan (28 November 1910 – 20 October 1967) was an Indian revolutionary and member of the Hindustan Socialist Republican Association.

== Early life ==
Vaishampayan was born on 28 November 1910 at Banda in the United Provinces of Agra and Oudh. When his father was transferred, he came to Jhansi and began studying in the Saraswati School.

== Revolutionary activities ==
During college, an arts teacher, Rudra Narayan, introduced Vaishampayan to Shachindranath Bakshi, a revolutionary, when the latter had come to Jhansi to recruit for the revolutionary party, Hindustan Republic Association (HRA). Two more youths enrolled were Sadashiv Malkapurkar and Bhagwan Das Mahaur. They were later introduced to Chandrashekhar Azad when he came to reside in seclusion after the Kakori incident. Vaishampayan became a sort of bodyguard-cum-secretary to Azad. He was trained in marksmanship by Azad and was one of the HRA members who had learned to make bombs.

Vaishampayan was assigned with the task of evaluating the possibility of freeing Bhagat Singh from Lahore jail. Bhagat Singh and Batukeshwar Dutt had surrendered themselves to the police immediately after the assembly bombing. Now, the British government wanted to link him to the Saunders murder case, which meant a certain death by hanging for the accused. Vaishampayan visited Lahore jail, disguised as a Punjabi gentleman. He managed to contact Bhagat Singh but the latter didn't have any intention of escaping from the jail.

Azad and others still decided to attack the police convoy and free Bhagat Singh. They rented a half section of a bungalow near Lahore. The team consisted of Azad, Bhagwati Charan Vohra, Vishwanath Vaishampayan, Dhanvantari, Sukhdev Raj, Yashpal, and Durgawati devi. Chail Bihari, Madan Gopal and Tahal Ram were the working under the guise of house servant, cook and driver, respectively.

On 28 May 1930, at about 1625 hours, Vohra, Vaishampayan, and Sukhdev Raj proceeded towards the river Ravi on bicycles. They took a boat and proceeded towards the dense forests by the river bank, with the objective to test bombs which could be used during Bhagat Singh's rescue attempt. Vohra unpinned a bomb but before he could hurl it, it exploded. Vohra was fatally wounded, his hand blew off and he was almost disemboweled. Sukhdev Raj's foot was hit by a splinter and he rushed to the bungalow to inform others while Vaishampayan stayed with Vohra. He peeled some oranges for Vohra to sip but the latter died soon, wishing before death that Bhagat Singh should be rescued soon.

Azad and some associates positioned themselves in a lorry outside the jail. Vaishampayan played some flute notes as a predetermined signal for Bhagat Singh but the latter didn't pay any heed and the team had to return. The bungalow had to be deserted to avoid the police and Azad immediately sent Vaishampayan to Jaipur to procure more arms. In spite of the dangers of being caught or killed by the police, he managed to procure the arms.

Azad and Vaishampayan started to operate from Allahabad and Kanpur. To battle the winter frost, both of them used Ludhiana shawls. Once, they wanted to travel from Allahabad to Kanpur but before the journey commenced, Azad and Vaishampayan donned woolen coats, instead of shawls. The police was patrolling Kanpur station because someone had tipped them off that Azad and Vaishampayan were wearing Ludhiana shawls and will alight at the Kanpur station. The police started searching the people wearing shawls. Azad gave orders to Vishwanath to escape but if there is a fight, both of them should fight till the last bullet. Azad hired a porter and all three simply walked out of the station, unidentified. Soon, Vaishampayan and Azad parted ways for different missions. On 11 February 1931, police arrested Vaishampayan who fell prey to a scheme devised by Veerbhadra Tiwari and Shivcharan Lal. Azad shot himself after an encounter with police on 27 February 1931.

Vaishampayan was tried in multiple cases like the Gwalior conspiracy and Delhi Conspiracy Commission. He served imprisonment of varying terms in the jails of Kanpur, Nainital, and Delhi before getting released on 19 March 1939.

== Later life ==
He devoted himself to writing and translating of works of Indian authors like Prabhavati Saraswati and Hari Narayan Apte. He worked with the daily 'Mahakoshal' in Raipur for 8 years. He wrote a book on Azad but his desire to write a book on Bhagwati Charan Vohra remained unfulfilled.

== Death ==
Vishwanath died on 20 October 1967. He was survived by his wife, Lalila Vaishampayan, and two daughters.

== Bibliography ==
- Amar Shahid Chandrashekhar Azad(Original Hindi title: अमर शहीद चंद्रशेखर आज़ाद) (1965), 3 volumes, University of Michigan.
