= Chandra Shekhar Azad =

Indian revolutionary and freedom fighter (1906–1931)

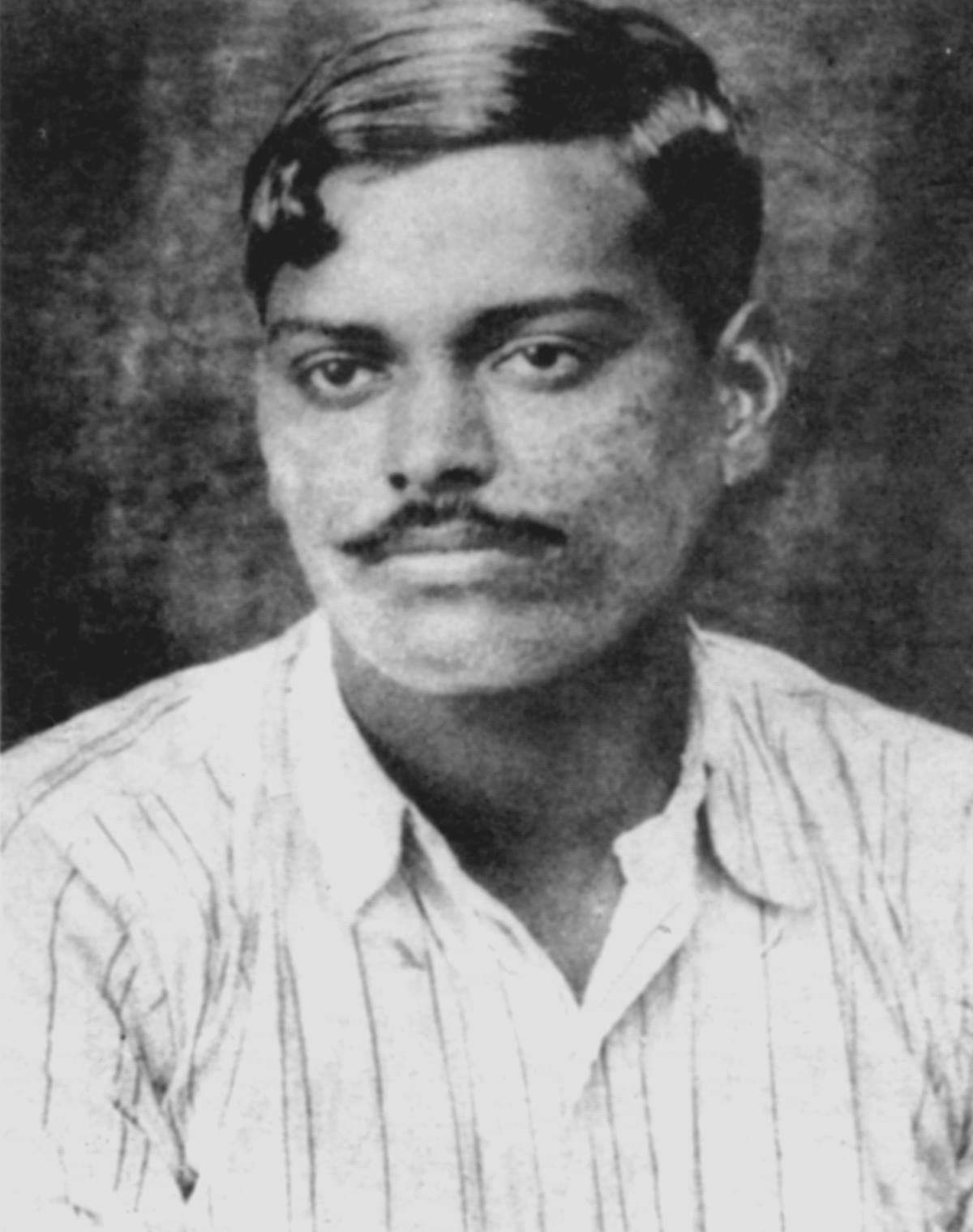
- Azad in 1926
- Born: Chandra Shekhar Sitaram; 23 July 1906; Bhabhra, Alirajpur State, British India
- Died: 27 February 1931 (aged 24); Allahabad, United Provinces, British India
- Cause of death: Suicide by gunshot
- Other names: Azad; Balraj
- Occupation: Revolutionary
- Organization: Hindustan Socialist Republican Association
- Movement: Indian Independence Movement

Chandra Shekhar Sitaram Tiwari (23 July 1906 – 27 February 1931), popularly known as Chandra Shekhar Azad, was an Indian revolutionary who reorganised the Hindustan Republican Association (HRA) under its new name of Hindustan Socialist Republican Association (HSRA) after the deaths of its founder, Ram Prasad Bismil, and three other prominent party leaders, Roshan Singh, Rajendra Nath Lahiri and Ashfaqulla Khan. He hailed from Bardarka village in Unnao district of United Provinces and his parents were Sitaram Tiwari and Jagrani Devi. He often used the pseudonym "Balraj" while signing pamphlets issued as commander-in-chief of the HSRA. Bhagat Singh, Sukhdev Thapar and Shivaram Rajguru worked closely with him as his pupil.

== Early life ==
Chandra Shekhar Azad was born on 23 July 1906 in Bhabhra village as Chandra Shekhar Tiwari, in a Kanyakubja Brahmin family in the princely state of Alirajpur. His forefathers were from Badarka village, in Unnao district of Uttar Pradesh. His mother, Jagrani Devi, was the third wife of Sitaram Tiwari, whose previous wives had died young. After the birth of their first son, Sukhdev, in Badarka, the family moved to the Alirajpur State.

His mother wanted her son to become a great Sanskrit scholar and persuaded his father to send him to Kashi Vidyapeeth in Banaras to study. In 1921, when the Non-Cooperation Movement was at its height, Chandra Shekhar, then a 15 years old student, joined. As a result, he was arrested on 24 December. On being presented before the Parsi district magistrate, Justice M. P. Khareghat, two weeks later, he gave his name as "Azad" (The Free), his father's name as "Swatantrata" (Independence) and his residence as "Jail". The angered magistrate punished him with 15 blows.

== Revolutionary life ==
After the suspension of the non-cooperation movement in 1922 by Mahatma Gandhi, Azad became disappointed. He met a young revolutionary, Manmath Nath Gupta, who introduced him to Ram Prasad Bismil who had formed the Hindustan Republican Association (HRA), a revolutionary organisation. He then became an active member of the HRA and started to collect funds for HRA. Most of the funds were collected through robberies of government property. He was involved in the Kakori Train Robbery of 1925, the shooting of John P. Saunders at Lahore in 1928 to avenge the killing of Lala Lajpat Rai, and at last, in the attempt to blow up the Viceroy of India's train in 1929.

Azad got to read Karl Marx's Manifesto of the Communist Party from his comrade Shiv Verma. When Azad was the commander-in-chief of the revolutionary party, he often used to borrow a book called ABC of Communism from writer Satyabhakta to teach socialism to his cadres. Despite being a member of Indian National Congress, Motilal Nehru regularly gave money in support of Azad.

== Activities in Jhansi ==
Azad made Jhansi his organisation's hub for some time. He used the forest of Orchha, situated 15 kilometres (9.3 mi) from Jhansi, as a site for shooting practice and, being an expert marksman, he trained other members of his group. He built a hut near a Hanuman temple on the banks of the Satar River and lived there under the alias of Pandit Harishankar Bramhachari for a long period. He taught children from the nearby village of Dhimarpura and thus managed to establish a good rapport with the local residents.

While living in Jhansi, he also learned to drive a car at the Bundelkhand Motor Garage in Sadar Bazar. Sadashivrao Malkapurkar, Vishwanath Vaishampayan and Bhagwan Das Mahaur came in close contact with him and became an integral part of his revolutionary group. The then Congress leaders, Raghunath Vinayak Dhulekar and Sitaram Bhaskar Bhagwat were also close to Azad. He also stayed for some time at the house of Rudra Narayan Singh at Nai Basti, as well as Bhagwat's house in Nagra.

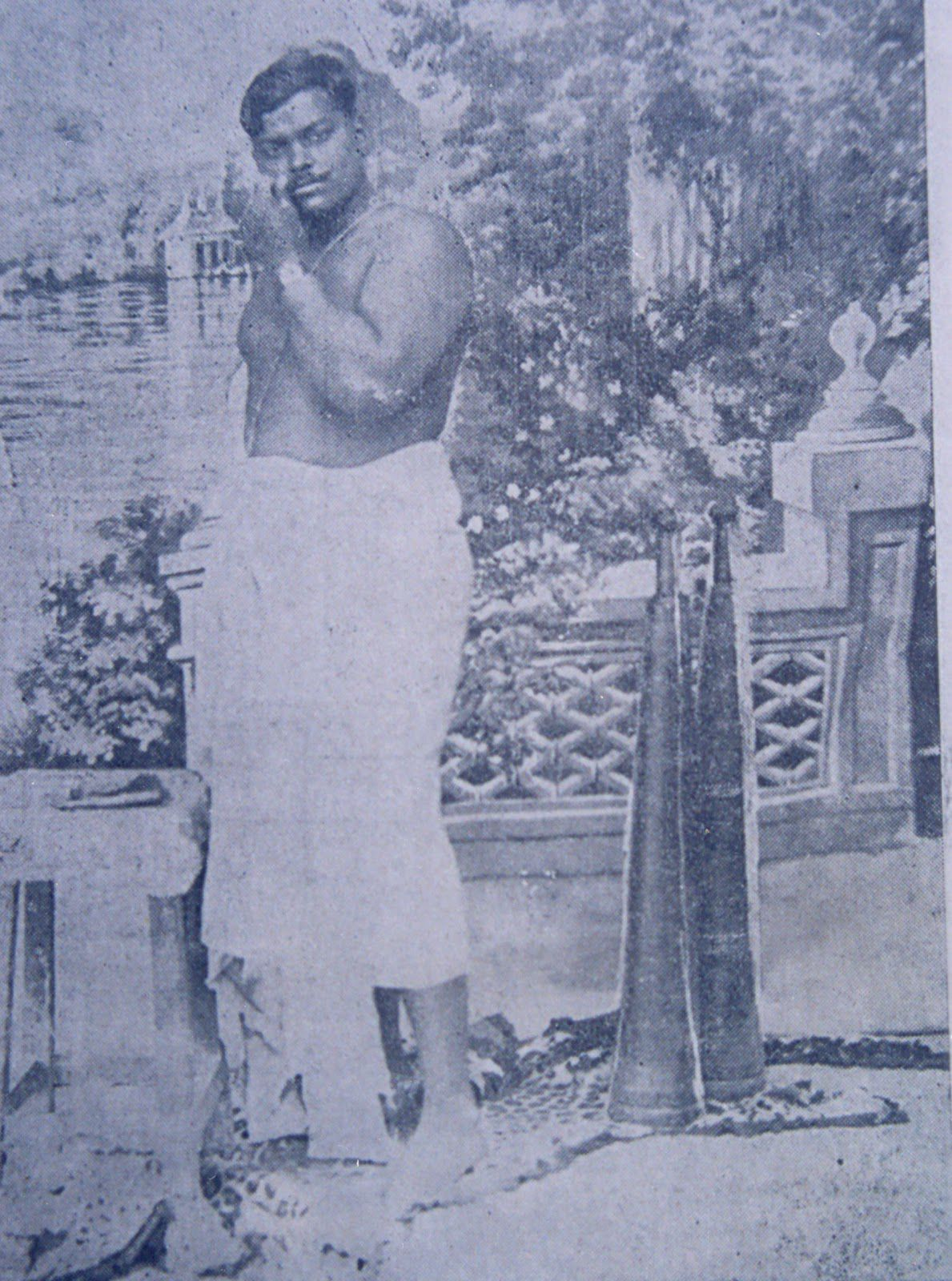
Chandrasekhar Azad in Jhansi, in Rudranarayan's house

== With Bhagat Singh ==
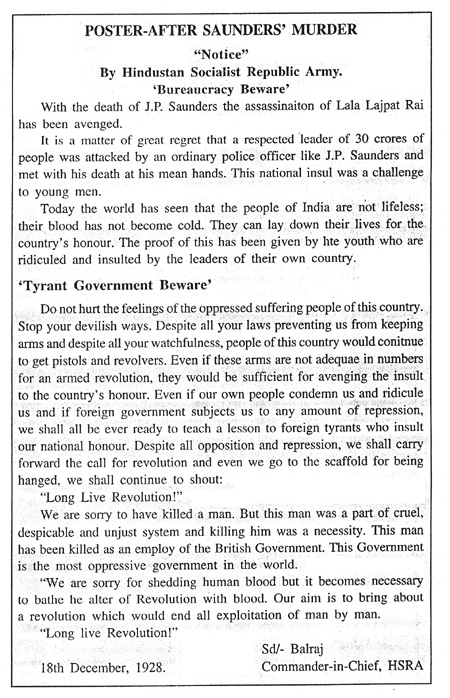
HSRA pamphlet after Saunders' murder, signed by Balraj, a pseudonym of Azad

The Hindustan Republican Association (HRA) was formed by Ram Prasad Bismil, Jogesh Chandra Chatterjee, Sachindra Nath Sanyal and Sachindra Nath Bakshi in 1923. In the aftermath of the Kakori train robbery in 1925, the British suppressed revolutionary activities. Prasad, Ashfaqulla Khan, Thakur Roshan Singh and Rajendra Nath Lahiri were sentenced to death for their participation. Azad, Keshab Chakravarthy and Murari Lal Gupta evaded capture. Azad later reorganised the HRA with the help of fellow revolutionaries like Shiv Verma and Mahabir Singh.

In 1928, along with Bhagat Singh and other revolutionaries he secretly reorganised the Hindustan Republican Association (HRA), renaming it as the Hindustan Socialist Republican Association (HSRA) on 8—9 September, so as to achieve their primary aim of an independent socialist India. Azad then conspired with revolutionaries like Bhagat Singh, Sukhdev Thapar and Shivaram Rajguru to assassinate the Superintendent of police, James A. Scott in order to avenge Lala Rajpat Rai's death. However, in a case of mistaken identity, the plotters assassinated John P. Saunders, an Assistant Superintendent of Police, instead of Scott. Azad also shot dead an Indian police head constable Channan Singh who attempted to chase Singh and Azad, as he was leaving the District Police Headquarters in Lahore on 17 December 1928. An insight into his revolutionary activities is provided by Manmath Nath Gupta, a fellow member of HSRA in his numerous writings. Gupta has also written his biography titled "Chandrashekhar Azad" in his book History of the Indian Revolutionary Movement (English version of above: 1972) which provides further insights on Azad's activities, his ideologies, and the HSRA.

== Death ==
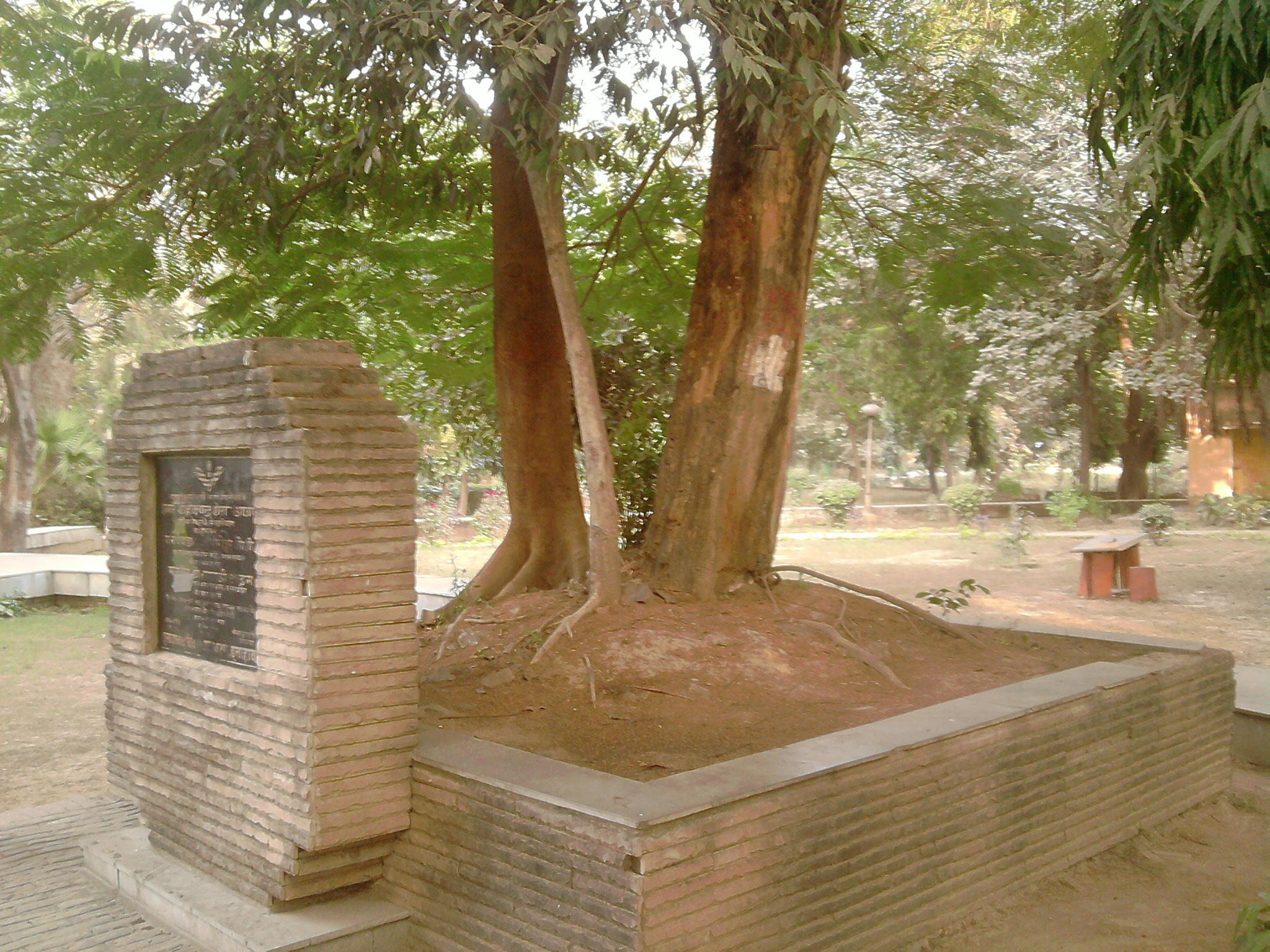
The tree in Chandrashekhar Azad Park, Prayagraj where Azad died

On 27 February 1931, the CID head of the police at Allahabad, J. R. H. Nott-Bower was tipped off that Azad was at Alfred Park and was having a talk with his companion and aide Sukhdev Raj Shukla. On receiving it, Bower called on the Allahabad Police to accompany him to the park to arrest him. The police arrived at the park and surrounded it from all four sides. Some constables along with DSP Thakur Vishweshwar Singh entered the park armed with rifles and the shootout began. Azad killed three policemen but was badly wounded in the process of defending himself and helping his colleague Raj. Azad told him to move out in order to continue the freedom struggle and gave him cover fire for Raj to safely escape from the park. Azad hid behind a jamun tree to save himself and began to fire from behind it. That tree no longer survives because it was cut down by the British on the same day, now Azad's statue stands at the place of tree. One of the shots from Azad hit Bower's wrist, who was hiding behind a Moolashree tree. The police fired back. After a long shootout, holding true to his pledge to always remain Azad (Free) and never be captured alive, he shot himself in the head with his gun's last bullet. In the shootout, Bower and DSP Singh were injured in the right hand and jaws respectively. The police recovered Azad's body after the other officers arrived at the site. They were hesitant to come close to Azad after finding him dead.

The body was sent to Rasulabad Ghat for cremation without informing the general public. As it came to light, people surrounded the park where the incident had taken place. They chanted slogans against the British government and praised Azad.

== Legacy ==
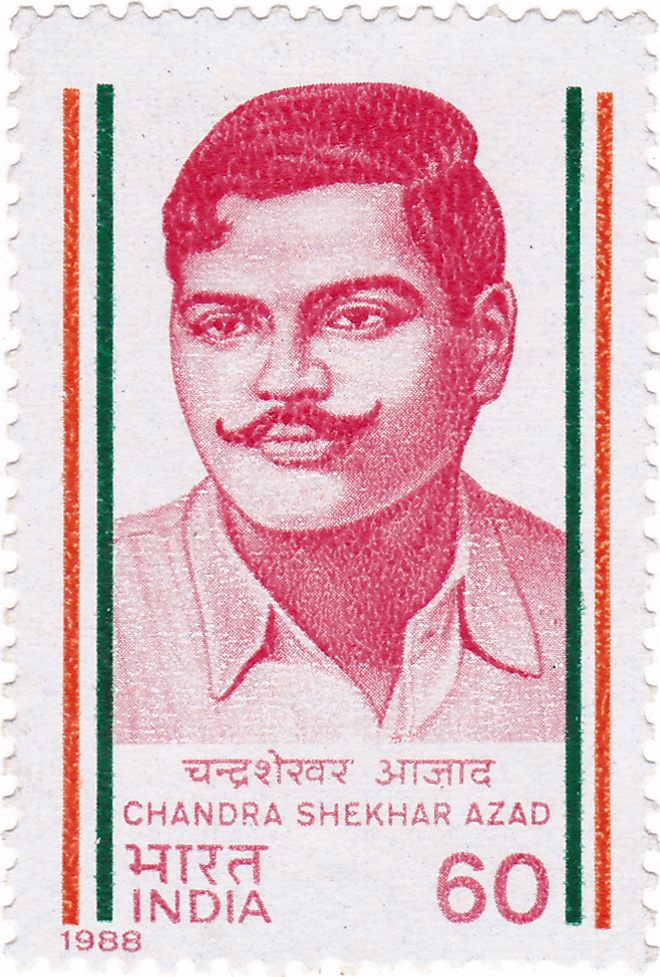
Chandra Shekhar Azad 1988 stamp of India

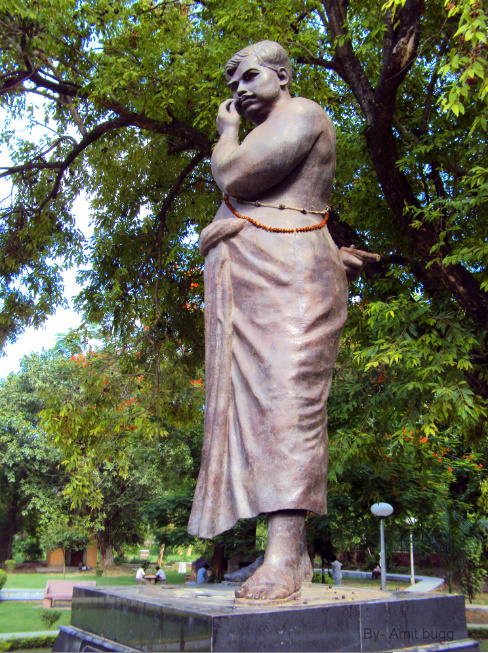
Statue of Azad at Alfred Park in Prayagraj

Jawaharlal Nehru in his autobiography wrote that Azad met him a few weeks before his death, inquiring about the possibility of not being considered an outlaw as a result of Gandhi-Irwin pact. Nehru wrote that Azad also saw the 'futility' of his methods and so did many of his associates, though was not completely convinced that 'peaceful methods' would work either.

Several schools, colleges, roads, and other public institutions across India are also named after Azad.

Starting from Jagdish Gautam's 1963 film Chandrasekhar Azad and Manoj Kumar's 1965 film Shaheed, many films have featured the character of Azad. Manmohan played Azad in the 1965 film, Sunny Deol portrayed Azad in the movie 23rd March 1931: Shaheed (2002), Azad was portrayed by Akhilendra Mishra in The Legend of Bhagat Singh (2002) and Raj Zutshi portrayed Azad in Shaheed-E-Azam (2002). In the 2006 film, Rang De Basanti, produced and directed by Rakeysh Omprakash Mehra, Azad was portrayed by Aamir Khan, which was about the lives of Azad, Bhagat Singh, Shivaram Rajguru, Ram Prasad Bismil, and Ashfaqulla Khan; the film drew parallels between the lives of young revolutionaries such as Azad and Singh, and today's youth, and dwelt upon the lack of appreciation among Indian youth today for the sacrifices made by these men.

The 2018 television series Chandrashekhar chronicled the life of Azad from his childhood to his being a revolutionary leader. In the series, young Azad was portrayed by Ayaan Zubair, Azad in his teens by Dev Joshi and the adult Azad by Karan Sharma.

In 2023 DD National serial Swaraj included a full episode (epi:65) on Chandra Shekar Azad. The title role of Chandra Shekar Azad was played by actor Manish Naggdev.

== See also ==
- Bhagat Singh
- Ashfaqulla Khan
- Kakori Train Robbery
- History of India
- Partition of India
- Partition of Bengal (1905)
- Independence Day (India)
- Indian independence movement
- Revolutionary movement for Indian independence
- Women of the Indian independence movement
