= Vaishampayan =

Vaishampayan is a surname. Notable people with the surname include:

- Bharati Vaishampayan (1954–2020), Indian singer
- Mugdha Vaishampayan (born 2000), Indian singer
- Vishwanath Vaishampayan (1910–1967), Indian revolutionary

== See also ==
- Vaishampayana, the legendary narrator of the Mahabharata
