= Bhagwati Charan Vohra =

Indian revolutionary (1903–1930)

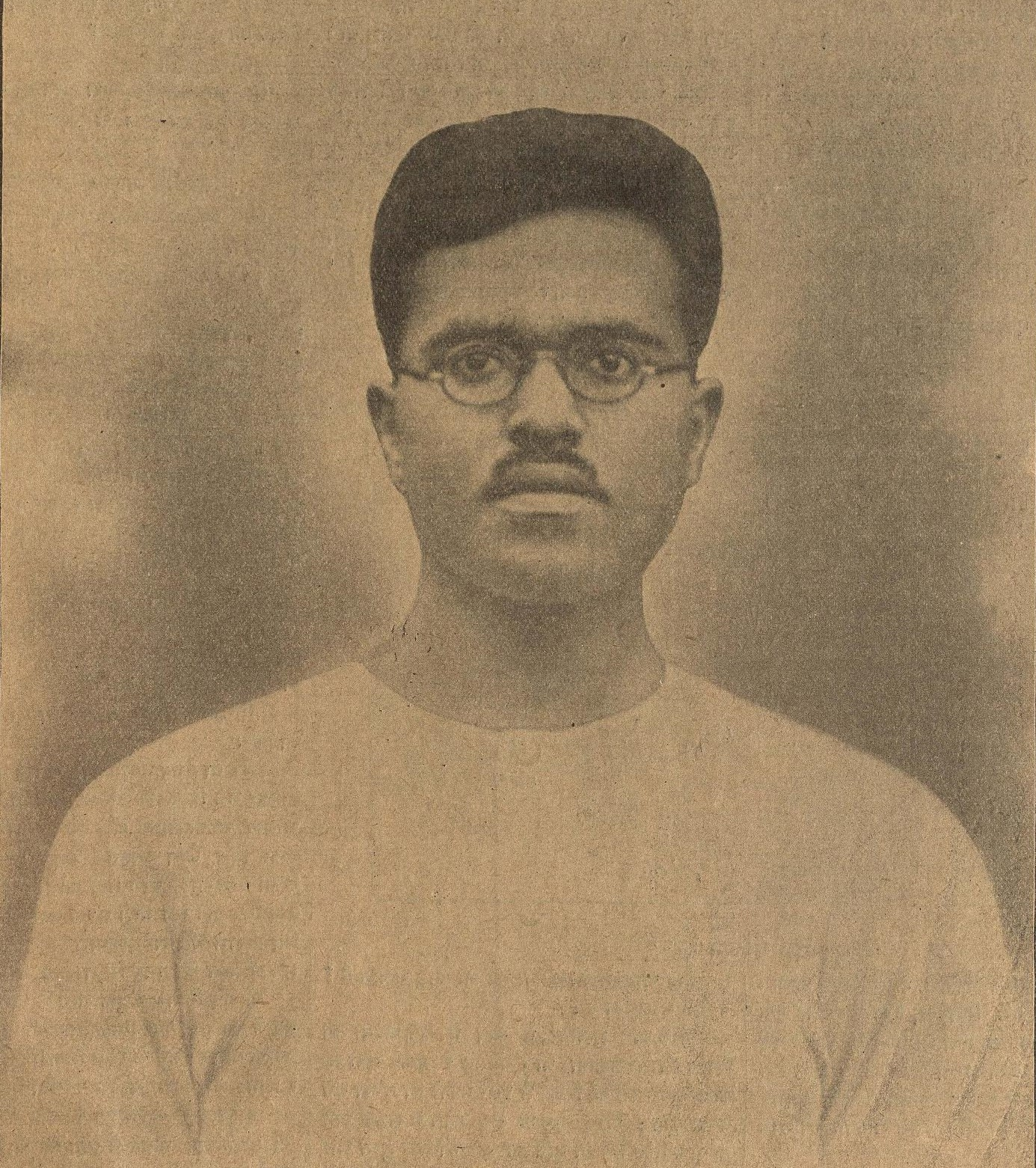
- Vohra in 1928
- Born: 15 November 1903; Lahore, Punjab, British India (present-day Punjab, Pakistan)
- Died: 28 May 1930 (aged 26); Lahore, British India
- Cause of death: Bomb wound
- Other names: Bhagwati Charan Vora
- Occupation: Revolutionary
- Organization(s): Hindustan Socialist Republican Association; Naujawan Bharat Sabha
- Movement: India's independence
- Spouse: Durgawati Devi
- Children: 1 (Sachindra Vohra)
- Father: Shiv Charan Vohra

Bhagwati Charan Vohra (15 November 1903 – 28 May 1930) was an Indian revolutionary, associated with Hindustan Socialist Republican Association. He was an ideologue, organiser, orator and campaigner.

== Early life ==
Bhagwati was born in 1903 in the family of a senior railway officer named Shiv Charan Vohra, who was conferred with the title of 'Rai Bahadur' by the British Raj in 1919 for his services and loyalty. He married Durgawati Devi, the daughter of Shri Banka Bihari from Allahabad. Vohra and Devi had their first child in December 1925, a boy whom they named Sachindra. Vohra passed intermediate in Science from F. C. College in 1921, and attended it later, after the call-off of the non-cooperation movement, at the National College, Lahore, which was established by Lala Lajpat Rai for those Indian students who couldn't gain admission in the government colleges.

== Revolutionary life ==
Vohra left his college studies to join the non-cooperation movement in 1921, and after the movement was called off, joined National College, Lahore where he received a BA degree. It was there that he was initiated into the revolutionary movement. He along with Bhagat Singh and Sukhdev started a study circle on the model of the Russian Socialist Revolution.

Vohra was an avid reader. He played a key role in infusing intellectual ideology into the functioning roots of the organizations he worked with. He was not influenced by caste prejudices, and worked towards Hindu-Muslim unity. He believed in the upliftment of the poor by with the use of socialist principles.

In 1926, when the Naujawan Bharat Sabha revolutionary organization was formed by his friend, he was appointed the propaganda secretary of the organization. On 6 April 1928, Vohra and Bhagat Singh prepared the manifesto for the Naujwan Bharat Sabha and urged young Indians to have a triple motto of "service, suffering, sacrifice", as their sole guide to achieve the goal of independence.

In the September of 1928, many young revolutionaries met at the Ferozshah Kotla ground in Delhi and reorganized the Hindustan Republican Association into the Hindustan Socialist Republican Association (HSRA) under the leadership of Chandrashekhar Azad. Vohra was appointed as the Propaganda Secretary and prepared the HSRA manifesto that was widely distributed at the time of the Lahore Session of the Congress. He was also party to the murder of J. P. Saunders and the throwing of bombs in Central Assembly Hall by Singh and Batukeshwar Dutt.

=== The Philosophy of Bomb ===
In 1929, Vohra rented room No. 69, Kashmir Building, Lahore and used it as a bomb factory. He planned and executed the 23 December 1929 bomb blast under the train of Viceroy Lord Irwin on the Delhi-Agra railway line. The viceroy escaped unhurt and Mahatma Gandhi thanked God for the narrow escape, condemning the revolutionary act through his article The Cult of Bomb.

In response to Gandhi's article, Vohra, in consultation with Azad, wrote an article entitled The Philosophy of Bomb. It appealed to youth to come forward and join them.

The concluding paragraph of the article reads

There is no crime that Britain has not committed in India. Deliberate misrule has reduced us to paupers, has 'bled us white'. As a race and a people, we stand dishonoured and outraged. Do people still expect us to forget and to forgive? We shall have our revenge – a people’s righteous revenge on the tyrant. Let cowards fall back and cringe for compromise and peace. We ask not for mercy and we give no quarter. Ours is a war to the end – to Victory or Death.

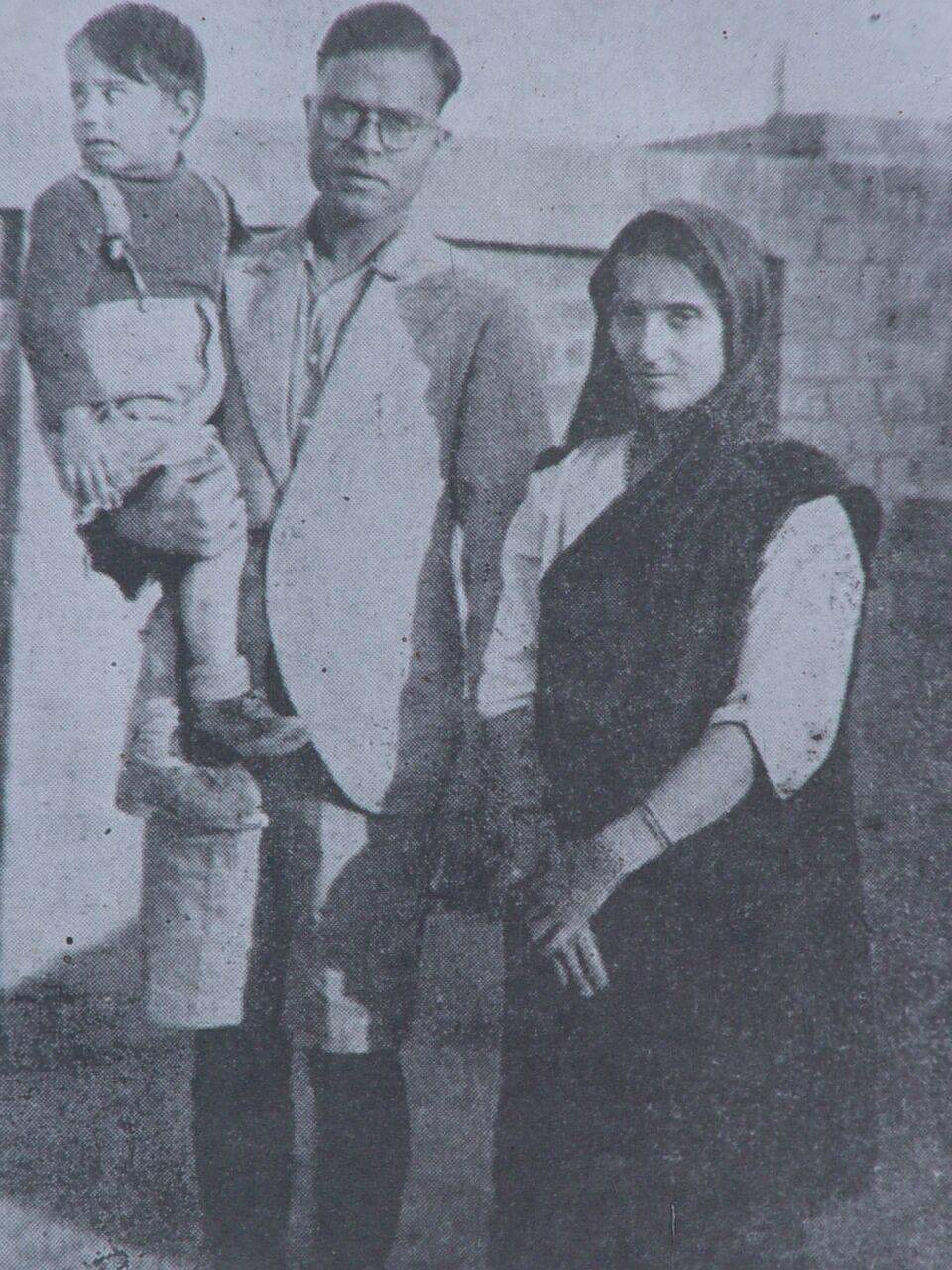
B.C. Vohra with his wife, Durga devi and his son Sachindra Vohra

== Death ==
Vohra died in Lahore on 28 May 1930 while testing a bomb on the banks of the Ravi. The device was required for the proposed rescue of Singh and others under trial in the Lahore Conspiracy Case but it exploded during the test and he was severely wounded.

He was survived by his wife Durgawati Devi (popularly known as Durga Bhabhi to the revolutionaries) and a son, Sachindra Vohra.

== See also ==
- Ram Prasad Bismil
- Kakori Train Robbery
- Revolutionary movement for Indian independence
- Manmath Nath Gupta
- Delhi Conspiracy Commission
