= Chan Chan (disambiguation) =

Chan Chan is an archaeological site in the Peruvian region of La Libertad and the capital city of the late intermediate period of the Chimor kingdom (850–1470 AD).

Chan Chan may also refer to:

- Chan-Chan, an archaeological site of an Early Neolithic hunter-gatherer camp (3700–3000 BC) on the coast of the commune of Mehuín in southern Chile
- Chan Chan (forest), a former forest that existed near Osorno and La Unión in southern Chile
- Chan Chan (singer), a Myanmar / Burmese pop singer and model
- "Chan Chan" (song), a song by Cuban musician Compay Segundo
- Chan Chan, a song on the soundtrack to the 2005 film Water
