= Bhavra =

Bhavra Bhabhra Chandra Shekhar Azad Nagar
- Town
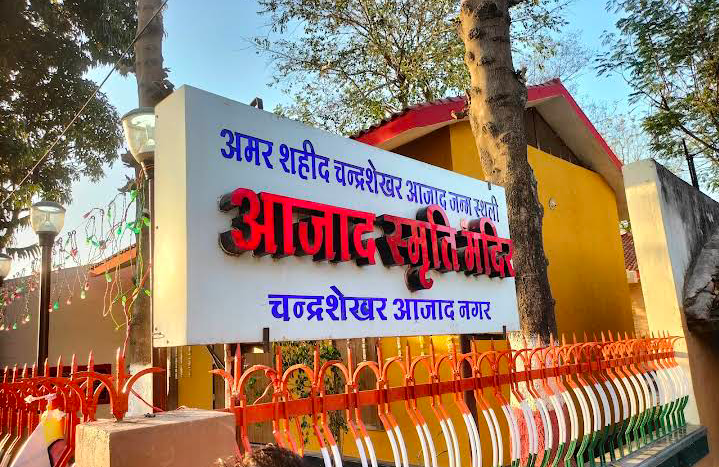
- Bhavara Town

- Location in Madhya Pradesh, India Bhavra (India)
- Coordinates: 22°31′48″N 74°19′28″E
- Country: India
- State: Madhya Pradesh
- District: Alirajpur district

Population (2011)
  - Total: 10,968

Languages
  - Official: Hindi
- Time zone: UTC+5:30 (IST)
- ISO 3166 code: IN-MP
- Vehicle registration: MP69

Bhavra also known as Bhabhra or Chandra Shekhar Azad Nagar is a town and a nagar panchayat in Alirajpur district in the state of Madhya Pradesh, India. It is the birthplace of the noted revolutionary Chandra Shekhar Azad.

== Demographics ==
As of the 2011 Census of India, Bhabhra had a population of 10,968. Males constitute 51% of the population and females 49%. Bhabhra has an average literacy rate of 54%, lower than the national average of 59.5%; with male literacy of 62% and female literacy of 45%. 19% of the population is under 6 years of age.

== Notable people ==
- Kanhaiya Lal Chauhan.
- Chandra Shekhar Azad.
