= Durgawati Devi =

Indian female revolutionary 1907 – 1999)

Durgavati Devi
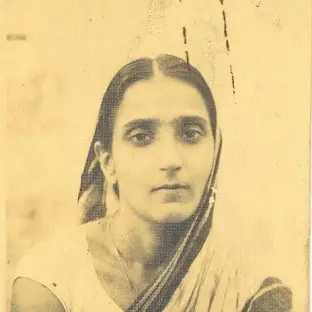
- Born: 7 October 1907; Shahjadpur Allahabad, United Provinces, British India (present-day Shahjadpur, Kaushambi, Uttar Pradesh, India)
- Died: 15 October 1999 (aged 92); Ghaziabad, Uttar Pradesh, India
- Other name: Durga Bhabhi
- Occupation: Revolutionary
- Organization(s): Hindustan Socialist Republican Association, Naujawan Bharat Sabha
- Movement: Indian independence movement
- Spouse: Bhagwati Charan Vohra
- Children: 1

Durgavati Devi (7 October 1907 – 15 October 1999), popularly known as Durga Bhabhi, was an Indian revolutionary and freedom fighter. She was one of the few women revolutionaries who actively participated in armed revolution against the ruling British Raj. She is best known for having accompanied Bhagat Singh on the train journey in which he made his escape in disguise after the killing of John P. Saunders. Since she was the wife of another Hindustan Socialist Republican Association (HSRA) member Bhagwati Charan Vohra, other members of HSRA referred to her as Bhabhi (elder brother's wife) and became popular as "Durga Bhabhi" in Indian revolutionary circles.

== Life ==
Devi was born in Allahabad. She was married to Bhagwati Charan Vohra when she was eleven.

She was an active member of the Naujawan Bharat Sabha, Devi came into prominence when the Sabha decided to observe the 11th anniversary of Kartar Singh Sarabha’s martyrdom on 16 November 1926 in Lahore. Devi was instrumental in helping Bhagat Singh and Shivaram Rajguru escape after the killing of John P. Saunders, a British police officer in Lahore, who, on the instructions of James Scott, killed Lala Lajpat Rai during a lathi charge.

She led the funeral procession of Jatin Das from Lahore to Calcutta after his death in a 63-day jail hunger strike. All along the way, huge crowds joined the funeral procession.

== Revolutionary activities ==
After Bhagat Singh surrendered himself for the 1929 Assembly bomb throwing incident, Devi attempted to assassinate Lord Hailey; he escaped, but some of his associates were injured. She was caught by the police and imprisoned for three years. She had also sold her ornaments worth ₹3,000 to rescue Singh and his comrades under trial.

Devi, along with her husband, helped Vimal Prasad Jain, an HSRA member, in running a bomb factory named 'Himalayan Toilets' (a smokescreen to hide the agenda of making bombs) at Qutub Road, Delhi. In this factory, they handled picric acid, nitroglycerine and fulminate of mercury.

Two days after killing John P. Saunders, on 19 December 1928, Sukhdev Thapar called on Devi for help, which she agreed to do. They decided to catch the train departing from Lahore for Bathinda en route to Howrah (Calcutta) early the next morning. She posed as the wife of Singh and put her son Sachin in his lap while Shivaram Rajguru carried their luggage as their servant. To avoid recognition, Singh had shaved off his beard and cut his hair short the previous day and dressed in Western attire. In fact, when Singh and Sukhdev came to her house on the night of 19 December 1928, Sukhdev introduced Singh as a new friend. Devi could not recognize Singh at all. Then, Sukhdev told Devi the truth and said that if Devi could not recognise Singh in his changed clean-shaved appearance despite knowing him well, surely the police would also not recognize him as they would be looking for a bearded Sikh.

They left the house early the next morning. At the station, Singh, with his concealed identity, bought three tickets to Cawnpore (Kanpur) — two first-class tickets for Devi and himself and a third class one for Rajguru. Both men had loaded revolvers with them to deal with any unanticipated incident. They avoided raising the suspicions of the police and boarded the train. Breaking the journey at Cawnpore, they boarded a train for Lucknow since the CID at Howrah railway station usually scrutinised passengers on the direct train from Lahore. At Lucknow, Rajguru left separately for Benares while Singh, Devi and the infant went to Howrah. Devi returned to Lahore a few days later with her infant child.

== Later life ==
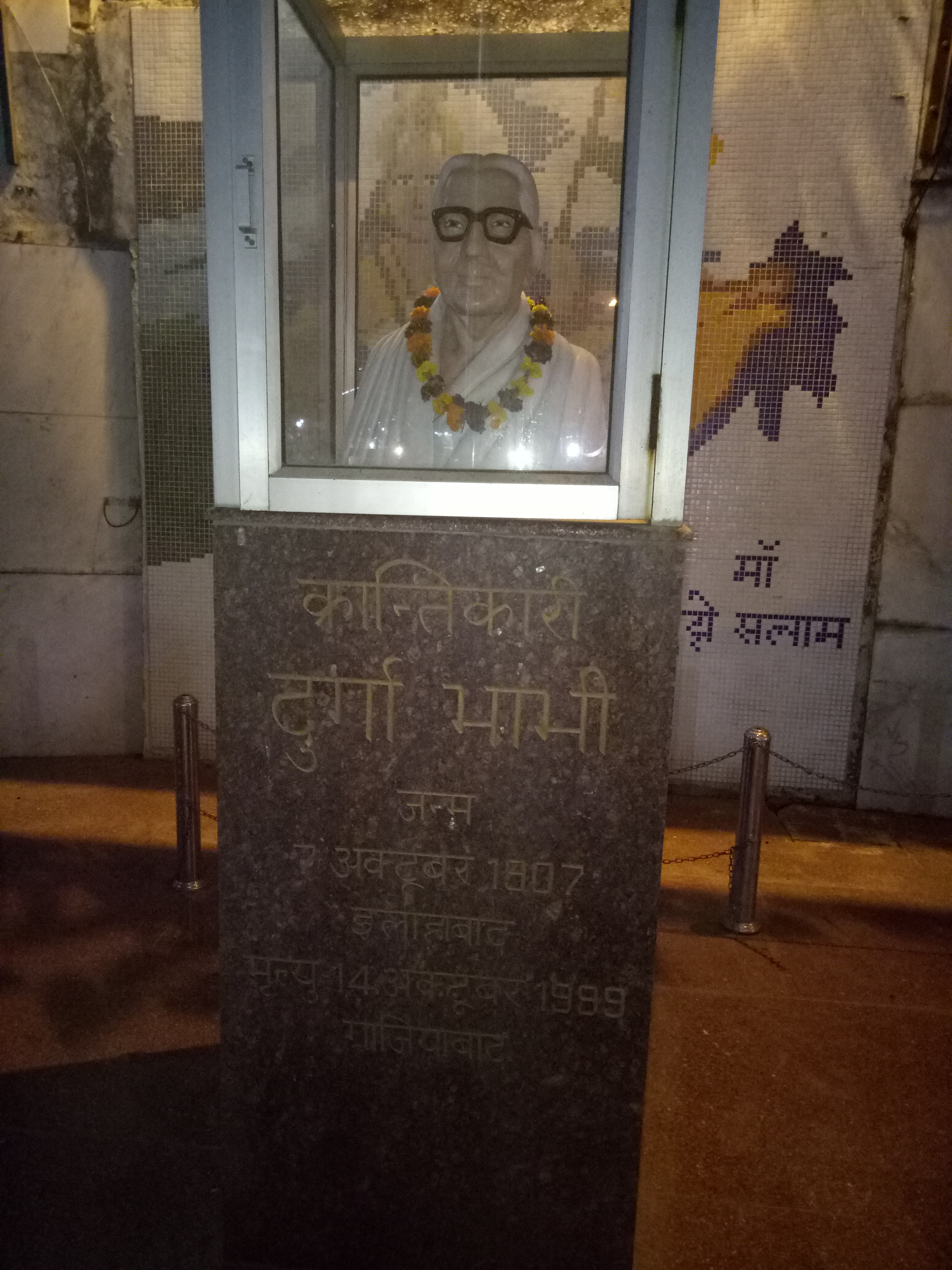
Durgawati Devi

Unlike other freedom fighters, after Indian independence, Devi started living as a common citizen in quiet anonymity and exclusion in Ghaziabad. She later opened a school for poor children in Lucknow. Devi died in Ghaziabad on 15 October 1999 at the age of 92.

== In popular culture ==
A small reference to her character was seen in Rakeysh Omprakash Mehra’s 2006 film Rang De Basanti, where Soha Ali Khan played her part.

The seventh episode of the 2014 Indian Epic TV anthology television series, Adrishya, is about Devi.

The 64 episode of the 2022 DD National's historical television series, Swaraj, is about Devi and her Husband.

== See also ==
- Ram Prasad Bismil
- Kakori Train Robbery
- Revolutionary movement for Indian independence
- Manmath Nath Gupta
- Delhi Conspiracy Commission
