= Roshan Singh =

Indian freedom fighter (1892–1927)

Thakur Roshan Singh
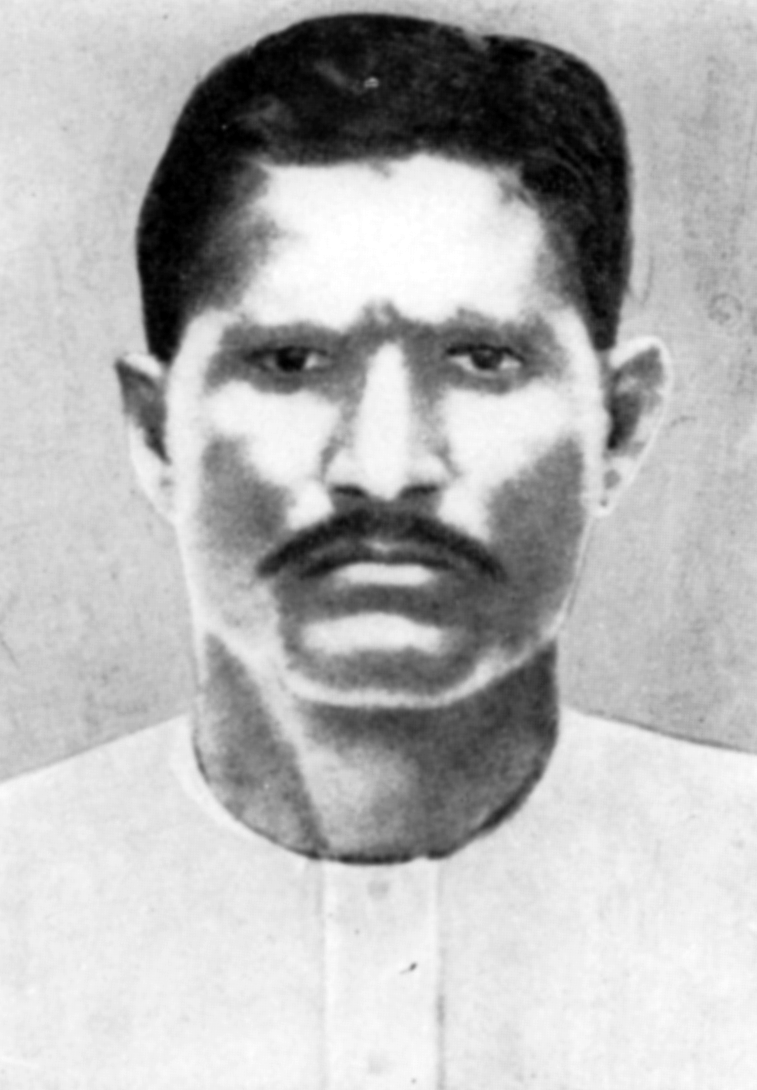
- Born: 22 January 1892; Shahjahanpur, North-Western Provinces, British India (present-day Uttar Pradesh, India)
- Died: 19 December 1927 (aged 35); Allahabad, United Provinces, British India (present-day Prayagraj, Uttar Pradesh, India)
- Cause of death: Execution by hanging
- Occupation: Revolutionary
- Organization: Hindustan Republican Association
- Movement: Indian independence movement

Thakur Roshan Singh (22 January 1892 – 19 December 1927) was an Indian revolutionary, born in the village of Nabada in Shahjahanpur district of United Provinces (Uttar Pradesh) in a Rajput family, who was sentenced in the Bareilly shooting case during the Non-Cooperation Movement of 1921–22. After release from Bareilly Central Jail, he joined the Hindustan Republican Association in 1924.

Although he had not taken part in the Kakori conspiracy of August 1925, he was arrested and tried in January 1926 by the then British Government, for a murder carried out during the Bamrauli dacoity in December 1924. He was sentenced to death, along with Ram Prasad Bismil, Ashfaqulla Khan and Rajendra Lahiri. He was executed at Allahabad Jail on 19 December 1927. It is well documented that after his death, his family had to face social and economic hardship, including problems finding a matrimonial match for his sisters.

== See also ==
- Ashfaqulla Khan
- Sukhdev Thapar
- Shivaram Rajguru
- Chandrashekar Azad
