= Mohammed Aslam =

- Born: Mohammed Aslam; Bengaluru
- Origin: India
- Occupations: Playback Singer, stage performer, Music Director, Lyricist
- Years active: 1994–present

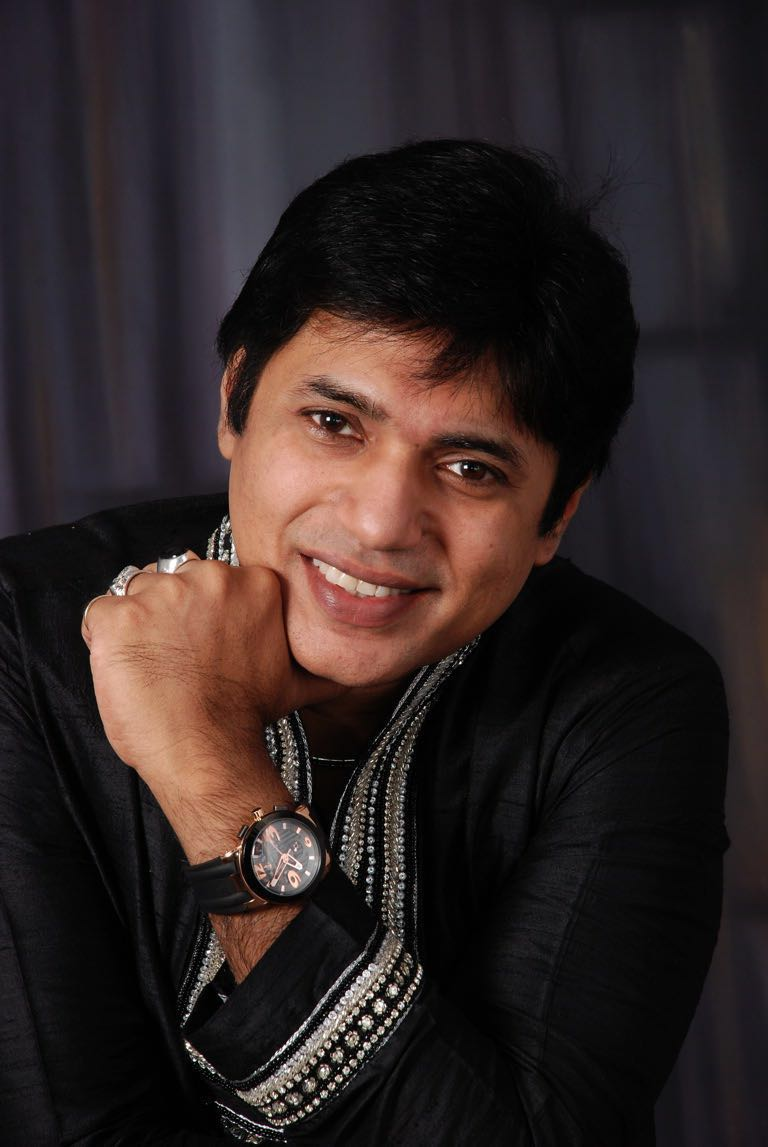
Mohammed Aslam

Mohammed Aslam is an Indian playback singer. He is most known for his stage performance called "Aslam Nite" dedicated to Mohammed Rafi songs. He has performed across India and Persian Gulf countries, and is also a playback singer in the Tamil and Bollywood film industries.

== Discography ==
=== Songs ===
Year	Film	Composer	Song
1994	Nattamai	Sirpy	"Naan Uravukaaran"
1996	Poove Unakkake	S A Rajkumar	"Oh Pyari"
1997	Love Today	Shiva	"Yen Pennendru" (Duet) with Bombay Jayasri
1998	Suryavamsham	S A Rajkumar	
2003	Naaga	Vidyasagar	"Anakapalli Centerlo ki Dhool"
2006	Aadatha Aattamellam	A R Reihana	"Thalattu padamal"
2006	Rang De Basanti	A. R. Rahman	"Paathshala" "Khalbali" "Paathshala (Be a Rebel)"
2006	Sillunu oru Kaadhal	A. R. Rahman	"Maaricham"
2006	Sillunu oru Kaadhal (Telugu)	A. R. Rahman	"Gaandharvam"
2006	Varalaru	A. R. Rahman	"Ilamai"
2006	Varalaru	A. R. Rahman	"Ilamai Remix"
2007	Guru (Gurukanth- Telugu)	A. R. Rahman	"Ee Haayilo"
2007	Azhakiya Tamizh Magan	A. R. Rahman	"Ponmagal Vandaal"
2007	Pallakki	Gurukiran	"O Priya"
2008	Saroja	Yuvan Shankar Raja	"Kodaana Kodi"
2008	Aegan	Yuvan Shankar Raja	"Hey Salaa"
2008	Jodha Akbar	A. R. Rahman	"Azeem-O-Shaan Shahenshah"
2008	Jaane Tu Ya Jaane Na	A. R. Rahman	"Pappu Can't Dance"
2009	Vaamanan	Yuvan Shankar Raja	"Lucky Star"
2009	Muthirai	Yuvan Shankar Raja	"July Madhathil"
2026	Gandhi Talks	A. R. Rahman	"Milirum Oliye"
