= Rang De Basanti (soundtrack) =

Soundtrack album by A. R. Rahman
- Released: 9 December 2005
- Recorded: Panchathan Record Inn; AM Studios
- Genre: Film soundtrack
- Length: 44:00
- Label: Sony Music India
- Producer: A. R. Rahman

A. R. Rahman chronology
Water (2005)	Rang De Basanti (2006)	Sillunu Oru Kaadhal (2006)

Professional ratings
Review scores
Source	Rating
Planet Bollywood	8/10 stars

The soundtrack to the 2006 film Rang De Basanti was released by Sony Music Entertainment on 8 December 2005 and had its music composed by A. R. Rahman and lyrics in Hindi and English by Prasoon Joshi and rapper Blaaze. The title track was used at a flash mob at Chhatrapati Shivaji Terminus in Mumbai on 27 November 2011 in honour of those who died in the 26/11 attack.

== Overview ==
From the film's announcement in April 2005, Rahman was slated to compose the music. In a press conference with pop singer Nelly Furtado, he said that she was to originally have featured on the soundtrack, although this was ultimately prevented from happening due to a change in producers and other factors. Star Aamir Khan, with his knowledge of Hindi and Urdu, worked with Rahman and Joshi for the film's soundtrack. In addition, screenwriter and director Rakeysh Omprakash Mehra and Rahman were reported to have chosen him to sing for one of the songs, though his recorded performance turned out to be more a poetic recitation.

Joshi was impressed with Mehra, who was ready to adjust to his style of writing as well as his creativity. Confessing that the film's soundtrack was his favorite out of all his previous works, Joshi felt that it "was a wonderful experience getting to know the mindset of today’s youth and to pen down their feelings". Speaking about one of his songs, "Luka Chuppi", in which veteran Lata Mangeshkar sang with Rahman, Joshi said that it was developed while discussing with Rahman the scene about a mother losing her son. Joshi wrote the lyrics about the mother and son playing hide-and-seek with the sad reality of the son being hidden forever. He confessed to have been in tears while Mangeshkar was singing the song. The soundtrack won the Filmfare Best Music Director Award, and had two of its tracks, "Khalbali" and "Luka Chuppi", considered for an Academy Award for Best Original Song nomination.

While discussing typical Bollywood soundtracks, Nilanjana Bhattacharjya, a professor of music at Colorado College noted that Rahman integrated traditional Punjabi cultural elements within his music for this soundtrack. Regionally defined elements such as a woman's prayer at the Sikh Gurudwara (Golden Temple) and the bhangra harvest dance are incorporated alongside more contemporary, global styles such as hard rock and hip hop to depict the cosmopolitan lifestyle of the youngsters in the film.

According to the Indian trade website Box Office India, with around 19,00,000 units sold, this film's soundtrack album was the year's third highest-selling.

== Track listing ==
No.	Title	Artist(s)	Length
1.	"Ik Onkar"	Harshdeep Kaur	1:27
2.	"Rang De Basanti"	Daler Mehndi, K. S. Chithra	6:06
3.	"Masti Ki Paathshaala"	Naresh Iyer, Mohammed Aslam	7:50
4.	"Tu Bin Bataayein"	Naresh Iyer, Madhushree	5:58
5.	"Khalbali"	A. R. Rahman, Mohammed Aslam, Nacim	6:19
6.	"Khoon Chala"	Mohit Chauhan	3:09
7.	"Paathshaala (Be A Rebel)"	Naresh Iyer, Mohammed Aslam, Blaaze	3:09
8.	"Luka Chuppi"	Lata Mangeshkar, A. R. Rahman	6:37
9.	"Lalkaar"	Aamir Khan	2:59
10.	"Roobaroo"	A. R. Rahman, Naresh Iyer	4:45
Total length:			44:02

== Awards ==
Academy Awards

- Longlisted- Academy Award for Best Original Song – A. R. Rahman for Lukka Chuppi
- Longlisted- Academy Award for Best Original Song – A. R. Rahman for Khalbali

National Film Awards

- Won- Best Male Playback – Naresh Iyer for Rubaroo

Filmfare Awards

- Won- Best Music Direction – A. R. Rahman
- Nominated- Best Lyrics – Prasoon Joshi for Rubaroo

IIFA Awards

- Won- Best Music Direction – A. R. Rahman
- Nominated- Male Playback – A. R. Rahman for Rubaroo
- Nominated- Male Playback – Naresh Iyer for Rubaroo
- Nominated- Female Playback – Lata Mangeshkar for Lukka Chuppi
- Nominated- Best Lyrics – Prasoon Joshi for Rubaroo

Zee Cine Awards

- Won- Best Music Direction – A. R. Rahman
- Nominated- Best Lyrics – Prasoon Joshi for Paathshaala
- Nominated- Best Choreographer – Ganesh Acharya for Paathshaala

Star Screen Awards

- Won- Star Screen Award for Best Background Music – A. R. Rahman
- Nominated- Star Screen Award for Best Music Director – A. R. Rahman
