= Badarka =

Badarka Badarka Harbansh
- Village
- Location in Uttar Pradesh, India Badarka (India)
- Coordinates: 26.46°N 80.49°E
- Country: India
- State: Uttar Pradesh
- District: Unnao
- Founder: Raja Harbans

Population
  - Total: 4,776

Languages
  - Official: Hindi
  - Additional official: Urdu
  - Regional: Awadhi
- Time zone: UTC+5:30 (IST)
- Postal code: 209801
- Vehicle registration: UP35
- Website: up.gov.in

Badarka, founded in 1643 CE, is a village & gram panchayat in Unnao tehsil of Unnao sub-district of Unnao district in Uttar Pradesh state of India. It is situated 15 km south of Unnao city between Ata & Lohcha villages on Kanpur-Raibareli road (also known as the Azad Marg). The village is famed for being the native place of the renowned freedom fighter Chandrasekhar Azad and his parents - father Pandit Sitaram Tiwari and mother Jagrani Devi.

== History ==
Badarka was founded in 1643 CE by Raja Harbans, an official at the court of Shah Jahan, who received a grant of 500 bighas from the mughal emperor in Harha pargana. He built the Badarka fort and palace here with the walls of limestone blocks to a height of about 500m, surmounted with turreted walls, on an elaborate frieze of red stone over the gateway, having alternately geese & elephants in pairs. A large hall of audience supported on carved pillars formerly stood here, but Asaf-ud-daula took these pillars to build Imambara at Lucknow.

== Geography ==
The total inhabited geographical area of the village is 68.08 hectares. Nearby cities are Unnao 15 km north, Jajmau 13 km southwest, Kanpur 16 km southwest and Purwa 34 km northeast.

Nearby tourist places are Kanpur 15 km, Bithur 28 km west, Lucknow 68 north, Rae Bareli 91 km east and Kannauj 96 km northwest.

Nearby villages are

- Rajwa Khera
- Lakha Pur
- Ramchara Mau
- Alhuapur Saresa
- Katri Alhuapur Sares
- Rawal
- Supasi
- Sathara
- Garsar
- Maviya Layak
- Chheriha

== Demography ==
In 2011 Census of India, Badarka Harbansh had location code 142320, 597 houses, 2,834 total population including 1,508 male and 1,326 female.

== Transport ==
Public & private buses are available.

- Nearby railway stations are:
  - Korari railway station, 7 km
  - Magarwara railway station, 8 km
  - Unnao railway station, 11 km
  - Kanpur Central railway station, 14 km
- Nearby airports
  - Kanpur Airport 10 km
  - Amausi Airport 58 km
  - Bamrauli Airport 191 km
  - Khajuraho Airport 214 km

== See also ==
- Chandra Shekhar Azad University of Agriculture and Technology
