= Delhi Conspiracy Commission =

1930 colonial commission in India

The Delhi Conspiracy Commission was created on 9 April 1930 by an order of the Chief Commissioner of Delhi, exercising his special powers under section 3(1) of the Code of Criminal Procedure. The commission was directed that certain persons shall be tried by it for the offence of conspiring to wage a war against the British King. The number of accused to be tried by the commission was 24 in all. Out of these 24 persons, 14 were arrested and produced before the commission, while nine were declared absconding, and one had died. Though only 24 persons were accused of the offence, during the trial it transpired that there were a large number of persons who had participated in the venture. It was an Indian revolutionary movement directed against the British to win India's freedom by violent revolutionary means.

== Constitution of the Commission ==
The three-member commission consisted of L.S.White (president) and members Kanwar Sain and Amir Ali. During the trial of the accused persons, the Crown was represented by Muhammad Zafarullah Khan and his team. The accused were represented by Asaf Ali with support from others.

== Accused before the Commission ==
On 14 May 1931, nine accused were presented before the commission. These were Nand Kishore Nigam, B.R. Gupta, Rudra Dutt Mishra, Bhagirath Lal, Hardwari Lal Gupta, K. R. Gupta, Harkesh Singh, Gajanand Potdar and Kapur Chand.

On that day, the Crown presented Kailashpati, who had turned state's evidence, as a witness. Asaf Ali, who represented the accused, attempted an objection to the oath being administered to Kailashpati on various legal technicalities. The Commission overruled the objection and directed the administration of oath. The memory of Kailashpati was phenomenal and he gave such a vast volume of detailed information on every minor and major subject, which ran into about 900 pages of deposition, that it became impossible for the prosecution to tie the loose ends of the story to secure conviction for the accused. It was primarily for this reason that at the final stage of the trial, the commission was disbanded by the Government before a verdict could be given by it.

The prosecution also presented other approvers in support of its case. These included Girwar Singh, who was produced on 24 February 1932 by the prosecution, and Dandpani Venkat Tailang, who was examined by the prosecution on 8 March 1932. Other approvers included Ram Lal, Madan Gopal and Bal Kishon (alias Kishen Bal).

== Barhelganj post office robbery ==
The primary goal of the Hindustan Socialist Republican Association (HSRA) was to gain independence of India from Britain by use of armed revolution. Kailashpati had been introduced to the movement in 1923 and in March 1928 he was asked to assist it by robbing his employer, the post office at Gorakhpur. He was transferred to the branch at Barhelganj before finding a suitable opportunity to carry out the scheme. On 26 June 1928, he took all the available funds held by the Barhelganj office, being around Rs. 3000 – and travelled with it by train to Cawnpore. He gave some of the money to Haldhar Bajpai and the remainder to Surendranath Pandey, with whom he stopped for two days. He then briefly moved into the room of Sheo Verma at the DAV College Hostel, where he met Sukhdev Raj, who was known as "Villager", Chandrashekhar Azad and Gaya Prasad. The group then split up, with Kailashpati moving to Lahore.

In needs of funds in late 1929, the group determined to rob the Punjab National Bank in Lahore but the plan was first postponed and then abandoned

== "The Himalayan Toilets" ==
Armed revolution required weapons, and at that time the HSRA had only small arms such as pistols and revolvers. Aware of the shortage of firepower, the HSRA sought to improve its position. They took to learning about chemical reactions from books in order that they could make bombs, then experimented accordingly. The successes were stockpiled and used in their missions, albeit not with great success. Sachchidananda Vatsyayan was known within the group as "Scientist" and was involved in the bomb-making activities. Babu Ram Gupta was a revolutionary and he used his shop in Billimaran as a facade for the purpose of buying bomb-making materials on a regular basis.

The intent was to manufacture picric acid, for which carbolic acid was also necessary. Towards this end, various items were bought through Gupta, including some sulphuric and nitric acids that were stored at Kailashpati's house until around the end of July and the beginning of August. At this time they were taken to the bomb factory, which was known as "The Himalayan Toilets" and bore signage accordingly. For these materials, which also included sundries such as rubber gloves and some potassium cyanide, Gupta was paid Rs. 600. Two electric fans were also required and were hired by Bimal Prashad Jain. The fans were used to expel the fumes from the factory and, since picric acid turns water yellow, any water expelled from the factory was dyed with another colour before being allowed to run outside. Attempts were also made to manufacture soap, oil and cream in order to cover their activities, with attention being paid to the nature of the fat bought for these purposes in order to not contravene religious considerations.

It was soon realised that the acid-making process was slow and various apparatus purchases were made in order to scale up production. The revolutionaries also obtained ice from a restaurant to assist in the manufacture of guncotton using nitric and sulphuric acid.

Nitroglycerine was also produced in the factory, and the group also intended to make hydrocyanic acid from potassium cyanide, initially purchased in weak form from Gupta and later in a stronger concentration from elsewhere. The revolutionaries knew that hydrocyanic acid produced a very toxic gas and that an antidote would need to be available if those manufacturing it were not to suffer. It was the inability to procure an antidote that caused them to abandon the attempt.

Kailashpati had shown a bombshell to Jain and suggested to him that it would useful to produce something similar. Jain in turn used some engineering contacts in an attempt to produce the item but it came to nothing as the suspicions of his contacts were raised.

At the end of October 1929, Bhagwati Charan Vohra was introduced to Kailashpati. At that time, Vohra was an absconder in the Lahore Conspiracy Case. He asked to meet Azad in Delhi

== Viceroy's train ==
Soon after, Vohra criticised suggestions of killing relatively minor Raj officials and proposed instead to blow up a train carrying the viceroy, Lord Irwin. Yashpal was at that time living in the same Delhi house as Vohra and the two men were experimenting with arrangements of batteries to blow lightbulbs, thinking that such might be used as a primitive method of detonating guncotton.

Early in December 1929, Vohra and Yashpal secured the agreement of Azad regarding blowing up the Viceregal train, the rationale of the HSRA being that it would prevent a meeting between Irwin and Congress. However, on 22 December, Azad said in a meeting that, although he agreed with the plan, since Congress leaders such as Ganesh Shankar Vidyarthi were against it, it ought to be postponed. Vohra, Yashpal and Tiwari thought Azad was wrong but the decision eventually went in his favour.

Explanatory documents had been prepared for circulation after the now-aborted attack, along with two seals – one of them representing a hand grasping a sword and the other the monogram "H.S.R.A". – that were to be used on them. In view of the turn in events, the documents were destroyed but Vohra managed to retain the seals.

The attempt to blow up the train occurred some hours later on 23 December. According to S. K. Mittal and Irfan Habib, this "caused a commotion throughout the British Empire", following soon after the retaliatory murder of a police constable, John Saunders, and the bombing of the Central Legislative Assembly, both of which acts had involved Bhagat Singh. Police activity in Delhi became intense and the Congress leader, Mahatma Gandhi, who was generally firm in his condemnation of violence, congratulated the viceroy, saying

This Congress deplores the bomb outrage perpetrated on the Viceroy's train and reiterates its conviction that such action is not only contrary to the creed of the Congress but results in harm being done to the national cause. It congratulates the Viceroy and Lady Irwin and their party including the poor servants on their fortunate and narrow escape. (Note: The various condemnations of revolutionary violence that were commonly expressed by Mahatma Gandhi were by no means universally accepted within Congress, which contained many prominent supporters who were nonetheless sympathetic to the armed struggle and in some cases actively aided it.)

After a few days spent in hiding, Azad, Jain and Kailashpati left on foot for Nalgarha, around 15 miles (24 km) from the city. There they hid on a farm operated by sympathisers. On 1 January 1930, Azad and Kailashpati returned to Delhi. The following day, Yashpal also returned and he faced questions regarding why the train had been blown up in defiance of the decision of the meeting. Yashpal replied that he had yielded to the insistence of his companions, explaining that he and Vohra had gone to the scene on the morning of 23 December and that he had pressed the button that caused the explosion. They had worn military uniform so that no one should suspect them and had escaped by boarding a train headed for Ghaziabad. Azad was not at all satisfied with Yashpal's explanation.

== The Philosophy of the Bomb leaflets ==
Two days after Yashpal arrived, Vohra returned and then Azad, Yashpal, Vohra and Kailashpati decided that in reply to a Congress resolution in praise of the Viceroy and in support of non-violence, a leaflet should be written by Vohra and distributed throughout India on the evening prior to "Independence Day", that is, 25 January 1930. Specifically, they intended to address a pamphlet issued by Gandhi – The Cult of the Bomb – which had criticised their methods.

In the event 500 leaflets were printed, entitled The Philosophy of the Bomb. These were then distributed on the intended day around educational buildings, to Congress workers and to press and news agencies. Other copies were posted to individuals, including Sir James Crerar, Home Member, Assembly, Delhi; Asaf Ali, the barrister; and Kamla Parshad Jain, of Baraut.

== Plan to rescue Bhagat Singh and others ==
Later, there was a meeting in Cawnpore, attended by B. B. Tiwari, Satgur Dayal Awasthi, Vohra, Azad and Kailashpati. They decided to rescue the accused in the Lahore Conspiracy case by releasing a gas in court that would render everyone present senseless and permit the accused to be rescued. Aside from rescuing Kundan Lal, Kanwal Nath Tiwari, Bijay Kumar Sinha, Bhagat Singh, Rajguru, Batukeshwar Dutt, Ajay Kumar Gupta, and Sanyal, it had been decided that Mahabir Singh, Sukhdev Raj and Desh Raj were to be killed because they had made statements which had been of great assistance to the police. Further, Shiv Verma, S. N. Pande and three others (including Agya Ram) were to be given another chance to prove their sincerity, while the case of Gaya Prasad was to be tried by the Revolutionary Tribunal as it was uncertain whether he had made a statement or not.

Yashpal was charged with producing the gas to be used for the rescue attempt but found it impossible to do so. This caused a decision to effect rescue by a desperate attack on the court, for which the various conspirators undertook firearms practice away from Delhi. Funding for the rescue attempt proved to be a problem and a raid on the monthly wage delivery made to the Railway Clearing Accounts Office on the first of each month was considered.

But in the meantime, a sum of Rs. 3000 was given by Durga Devi, the wife of Vohra, for the purpose of carrying out the rescue plan and so, as there was no urgent need for money, the plan of robbing the Railway Clearing Accounts Office was given up. About the beginning of May, some blank forms were brought from Cawnpore, which were to be typed and distributed to the public after the rescue of the prisoners at Lahore.

It was arranged that after the rescue, the freed accused were to be sent to different places for safety. Arrangements for this took some time, during which Kailashpati arranged for Azad to meet Madan Gopal, who agreed to join in the rescue attempt. On 1 June, a group of the conspirators travelled by car to Borstal Jail. They were armed with pistols and also bombs.

The plan was that while Bhagat Singh was to be led by police out of the jail gate towards the stationed police lorry, the captive was to rush towards the rescue-team, and the team, while taking control of the prisoner, was to deal with the emerging situation by killing any or all policemen who might obstruct the captive's escape to freedom or pursue him to capture. Bhagat Singh had been informed in advance of this rescue plan and the rescue team was legitimately under the impression that Bhagat Singh would rush towards them. However, Bhagat Singh showed by his behavior as if he was under the impression that they would rush towards him. In this confusing situation, both remained where they were and Bhagat Singh was taken away by the police in a lorry. Having returned to their accommodation, the conspirators suffered the effects of some of their own bomb-shells exploding of their own accord. The entire team living there dispersed quickly on the following morning.

Kailashpati was told in early June that Vohra had been killed in Lahore on 28 May 1930 through the explosion of a bomb which he was testing. Sukhdev Raj, who was with him, had been badly wounded in the foot and Vaishampayan had been burnt on the shin. Azad returned to Delhi and reported on the confused events of the failed rescue. He said that after his experience in Lahore he would never take any part in any action unless there was sufficient money and material. He also said that in order to raise funds the Railway Clearing Accounts Office should be raided on the first of the following month.

== Attempt by HSRA to kill Yashpal ==
A Central Committee meeting of the party determined that Yashpal, who was not present, had wasted much money in the attempts on the viceregal train and the rescue of Bhagat Singh. Yashpal was also blamed for the death of Vohra in the bomb explosion and was criticised for abducting Vohra's wife, Prakasho, contrary to the party's strict disciplinary rules of keeping one's character clean in the matter of engaging with women. The meeting decided that Yashpal should be killed.

It was also decided in the meeting that a terror campaign against highly placed government officials, approvers and traitors should be vigorously pursued throughout India. This decision was taken to terrify the Government and lower is public image, to win the confidence and sympathy of the general public and to teach a lesson to traitors and deter other weaklings within the party's rank from committing such anti-party and dangerous acts.

The meeting also decided that the party should organize a public demonstration in Punjab to honour Vohra in order to highlight his work and sacrifice and also to motivate and mobilize other young people.

Regarding Yashpal, the meeting decided that Kailaspati should go back to Delhi and send Yashpal to Cawnpore where Azad and Bir Bahadur Tiwari would kill him. After two or three days, Kailashpati left Cawnpore for Delhi and met Yashpal there. Kailashpati told Yashpal that Yashpal's presence was required by the Central Committee in Cawnpore. Yashpal made a brief visit to Cawnpore but returned to Delhi, much to the surprise of Kailashpati. Soon after, Kailashpati then discovered that Yashpal, Prakasho and Scientist had left the bomb-factory and had taken with them the available supplies of picric acid, guncotton and nitroglycerine, as well as a revolver.

Azad returned to Delhi and was very upset by what had happened but the group were unable to locate Yashpal in Delhi. It was decided to seek him in Lahore and to kill him by any means when he was found. Yashpal had already reached Lahore by that time and had spread the word about the plan of his killing among his friends by taking the position that the decision of the Central Committee of the party had been arrived at in his absence – without hearing his side – which was contrary to justice. Consequently, many members of the party in the Punjab were opposed to the decision of the Central Committee. In these circumstances, the team assigned the task of killing him met Yashpal but did not execute the plan.

== Gadodia Stores robbery ==
After abandoning the Railway Accounts office raid on 1 July, the party was in acute need of funds. It was suggested that a robbery take place at the Gadodia Stores in Delhi. The choice was affected by the fact that Bishamber Dayal was working there, and after a reconnaissance it was determined to act on 6 July. This action was a success, although the robbers were faced with a crowd of people who attempted to stop them as they left, causing them to fire their weapons in order to get away. The raid secured funds to the value of Rs. 13,250.

== Appeal ==
On 25 May 1932, Rudra Dutt Misra, Dhanwantri, K B Gupta, B R Gupta, S H Vatsayana, Azad Vidyabhushan, Vaishampayan and Bhagirath Lal Harkesh, individuals who were the accused sent a petition from 'Old Viceregal Lodge, Delhi' to the viceroy in his summer residence in Shimla. The conspiracy charge was finally dropped in February 1933 as untenable and the fact that there was not enough evidence to take it any further. Four of the accused were let off and the rest were to be tried individually 'for severe overt acts'.
