= Sitaram Bhaskar Bhagwat =

Indian politician and social leader

Sitaram Bhagwat

Personal details
- Born: 20 September 1904 Chhatarpur, Central Province, British India
- Died: 21 August 1999 (aged 94) Jhansi, UP, India
- Party: Indian National Congress
- Spouse: Savitri Bai
- Profession: Doctor

Pandit Sitārām Bhāskar Bhāgwat (20 September 1904 – 21 August 1999) was an Indian political and social leader in Uttar Pradesh, India.

== Personal ==
- Born on 20 September 1904 in Maharajpur village, Chhatarpur district, in Madhya Pradesh.

He was the second son of Pandit Bhaskar Narayan Bhagwat, who was a teacher at Maharajpur village, Chhatarpur district.

- Studied at Maharaja's High School, Chhatarpur.
- Came to Jhansi for higher studies.
- Married to Savitri Bai.
- Died 21 August 1999 in Jhansi.

== Independence movement ==
He actively participated in all the independence movements between 1921 and 1942. He was sent to jail several times. His wife, Savitri Bai Bhagwat also was jailed with her infant daughter. He was the main pillar of Congress' independence movement in Jhansi along with Pandit Raghunath Dhulekar. He was also a close friend of revolutionaries like Chandrashekhar Azad, Sadashivrao Malkapurkar, Bhagwan Das mahaur, etc. He was the president of Congress committee of Jhansi for many years.

== After independence ==
He continued teaching at Bundelkhand Ayurvedic College, Jhansi until 1974. He was the Pro Vice Chancellor of Jhansi Ayurvedic University. Sitaram Bhagwat was instrumental in promoting education in Bundelkhand area and had played important roles in building temples of education in the region, namely, Bundelkhand c College, Bundelkhand Degree College, Sanatan Dharma Kanya Inter College (for education of girls), and many others. He was a physician and practised pure Ayurveda until his death.

== Books authored ==
- Nagari Nootan Shiksha Paddhati (Published)
- Hruday Rog evam unki Chikitsa (Unpublished)
- Vajikaran evam Rasaayn Shaastra (Unpublished)
- Chandrashekhar Azad ke Sansmaran (Unpublished)
