= Rang De Basanti =

2006 Indian film by Rakeysh Omprakash Mehra

- Theatrical release poster
- Directed by: Rakeysh Omprakash Mehra
- Screenplay by: Rensil D'Silva; Rakeysh Omprakash Mehra
- Dialogues by: Prasoon Joshi
- Story by: Kamlesh Pandey
- Produced by: Rakeysh Omprakash Mehra; Ronnie Screwvala
- Starring: Aamir Khan; Siddharth; Sharman Joshi; Kunal Kapoor; Atul Kulkarni; Soha Ali Khan; Alice Patten; R. Madhavan; Waheeda Rehman; Anupam Kher; Kirron Kher; Om Puri
- Cinematography: Binod Pradhan
- Edited by: P. S. Bharathi
- Music by: A. R. Rahman
- Production companies: Rakeysh Omprakash Mehra Pictures; UTV Motion Pictures
- Distributed by: UTV Motion Pictures
- Release date: 26 January 2006
- Running time: 167 minutes
- Country: India
- Language: Hindi
- Box office: ₹97.90 crore

Rang De Basanti (transl. Paint Me In The Color of Spring) is a 2006 Indian Hindi-language historical drama film written, directed, and co-produced by Rakeysh Omprakash Mehra. The film stars an ensemble cast of Aamir Khan, Siddharth (in his Hindi debut), Sharman Joshi, Kunal Kapoor, Atul Kulkarni, Soha Ali Khan, Alice Patten (in her Hindi debut),and R. Madhavan with Waheeda Rehman, Anupam Kher, Kirron Kher, and Om Puri appear in supporting roles.

It follows a British film student traveling to India to document the story of five freedom fighters of the Indian revolutionary movement. She befriends and casts five young men in the film, which inspires them to fight against the injustices of their present-day government.

Shot primarily in New Delhi, Rang De Basanti was released worldwide on 26 January 2006. Upon release, the film broke all opening box office records in India, becoming the country's highest-grossing film in its opening weekend and holding the highest opening-day collections for a Hindi film. It eventually became the seventh highest grossing Hindi film of 2006. It received critical acclaim, winning the National Film Award for Best Popular Film, and being nominated for Best Foreign Language Film at the 2007 BAFTA Awards. The film was chosen as India's official entry for the Golden Globe Awards and the Academy Awards in the Best Foreign Language Film category, though it did not ultimately yield a nomination for either award. A. R. Rahman's soundtrack, which earned positive reviews, had two of its tracks considered for an Academy Award nomination.

== Plot ==
In London, film student Sue McKinley discovers the diary of her grandfather, James, who served as a British Army colonel in the 1930s. James oversaw the execution of Indian freedom fighters Bhagat Singh, Sukhdev Thapar, and Shivaram Rajguru at Lahore Jail, yet his diary reveals a secret, profound admiration for their revolutionary spirit. Inspired by their story, Sue travels to India to produce a documentary film about the revolutionaries. She enlists the help of her local friend Sonia, an international studies student at the University of Delhi. After a series of failed auditions, Sue encounters Sonia's circle of friends—Daljit "DJ" Singh, Karan Singhania, Sukhi Ram, and Aslam Khan. Recognizing their raw energy, Sue casts them in the film, assigning DJ as Chandra Shekhar Azad, Karan as Bhagat Singh, Aslam as Ashfaqulla Khan, and Sukhi as Rajguru.

The young men are carefree, disillusioned with their futures, and intensely cynical about India's political state, showing zero initial interest in a patriotic project. Friction develops when Sue casts their ideological rival, right-wing student activist Laxman Pandey, as Ram Prasad Bismil, though the group gradually bonds during rehearsals. As filming progresses, the boys begin to unconsciously internalize the idealism of the historical figures they portray, and Sue enters into a romantic relationship with DJ.

The group's apathy is shattered when Sonia's fiancé, Flight Lieutenant Ajay Singh Rathod, dies in a MiG-21 fighter jet crash. The government quickly covers up the tragedy by blaming pilot error, but Sonia and the boys know Ajay was a skilled pilot who sacrificed himself to steer the malfunctioning aircraft away from a densely populated residential zone. Their private investigation reveals that the Defence Minister, Shastri, accepted bribes from a corrupt industrialist to sanction the use of cheap, substandard spare parts for the aircraft. Karan is horrified to discover that his own wealthy father, Rajnath Singhania, was the middleman who orchestrated the lethal deal.

Channeling the revolutionary fervor of their film characters, the group coordinates a massive, peaceful candlelight vigil at India Gate. The government orders a brutal police crackdown to disperse the demonstrators, leaving Ajay's grieving mother, Aishwarya, severely beaten and in a vegetative coma. Witnessing his own political superiors justify the state-sponsored violence, a disillusioned Laxman abandons his party and aligns with DJ's group. Convinced that the legal system is entirely compromised, the five friends resolve to adopt the radical methods of the HRA. They assassinate Shastri to avenge Ajay, and Karan confronts and shoots his father dead.

The media and government spin the assassination, framing Shastri as a tragic martyr killed by terrorists. To counteract the state narrative, the boys launch a final, desperate mission to expose the truth. They infiltrate and occupy the All India Radio station, peacefully evacuating the civilian staff. Karan takes the microphone, broadcasting a nationwide confession that details the defense ministry's corruption and their motivations for the murders. The government dispatches heavily armed tactical units with explicit orders to eliminate the group. In the ensuing shootout, Sukhi is shot dead, while Aslam and Laxman are killed by a grenade blast. A critically wounded DJ drags himself into the recording studio to join Karan just as he concludes the broadcast, and the two friends are gunned down together.

The public broadcast of the boys' final moments triggers widespread national outrage, sparking massive anti-government protests across the country. Aishwarya subsequently awakens from her coma, finding that the corrupt regime has been shaken. The film concludes with Sue reflecting on the profound personal transformation she experienced through the boys, while the spirits of the deceased friends peacefully reunite with a young Bhagat Singh in his ancestral garden.

== Cast ==
- Aamir Khan in a dual role as
  - Daljit "DJ" Singh
  - Chandra Shekhar Azad
- Siddharth in a dual role as
  - Karan Singhania
  - Bhagat Singh
- Sharman Joshi in a dual role as
  - Sukhi Ram
  - Shivaram Rajguru
- Kunal Kapoor in a dual role as
  - Aslam Khan
  - Ashfaqulla Khan
- Soha Ali Khan in a dual role as
  - Sonia Chaudhary
  - Durgawati Devi
- Atul Kulkarni in a dual role as
  - Lakshman Pandey
  - Ram Prasad Bismil
- R. Madhavan as Flight Lt. Ajay Singh Rathod
- Alice Patten as Sue McKinley
- Waheeda Rehman as Mrs. Aishwarya Rathod, Ajay's mother
- Kirron Kher as Mitro Kaur, DJ's mother
- Om Puri as Amanullah Khan, Aslam's father
- Anupam Kher as Rajnath Singhania, Karan's father
- Mohan Agashe as Defence Minister V. K. Shastri
- Steven Mackintosh as James McKinley, Sue's grandfather
- Lekh Tandon as DJ's grandfather
- K. K. Raina as Raghuvir Mishra
- Chandan Roy Sanyal as Batukeshwar Dutt
- Cyrus Sahukar as Rahul, a radio jockey and Karan's friend
- Badrul Islam in a dual role as
  - Ravi
  - Sukhdev Thapar
- Tushar Pandey as an auditioner
- Abhishek Banerjee as an auditioner

== Production ==
=== Development ===
Rakeysh Omprakash Mehra spent seven years researching and developing the story, including three to write the script. While some raised doubts about his morale following the failure of his last film, Aks, at the box-office, he retorted by saying that it would not affect him at all. He added that not only did his storytelling technique improve, but past mistakes had helped him improve his filmmaking abilities.

Rakeysh said the following in a scriptwriter's conference conducted by the Film Writers Association in the year 2008, "I was making a documentary called Mamooli Ram, on Amul, the milk revolution with Kamalesh Pandey. We were sitting in a small hotel room in Nanded, drinking. We started singing songs, and we both realized we liked similar songs. And so Rang De Basanti was born. He was angry with the system, I was helpless with the system. We wanted to do so much. But we really can't do anything and it was born out of anger. He wrote a story called Ahuti, meaning sacrifice. Ahuti was about the armed revolution in India, between 1919 and 1931. It started with Ashfaqullah Khan, Ramprasad Bismil, Bhagat Singh, Rajguru, went on to Chandrashekhar Azad and so on. We had this amazing screenplay called Ahuti, which we had also termed as The Young Guns of India, which started with a train robbery, Azad on a horse and so on. I said, "let's do The Young Guns of India". We were going to go on the floor, and suddenly there were a couple of film on Bhagat Singh made. But they came and went. Not because they were good or bad films, not because they were written badly or not written so badly. I'm not being judgmental about them. And this is very important: because they did not reflect the sentiment of today's time. Nobody in the audience could identify with something which was past. It wasn't that there wasn't an idea of patriotism in us, but it was sleeping somewhere. And you had to kind of relate to it in today's world. So a couple of bottles of vodka again, and three days later, with a couple of vodkas down, Kamlesh Ji comes up with 'You know what, I think I've cracked it'."

Development of Rang De Basanti originated with several ideas Mehra came up with early on but later dropped or greatly evolved into new directions. One of these involved a group of youngsters who worked in an automobile repair shop, while another was about the life of Bhagat Singh, Indian freedom revolutionary. During this time, he personally conducted a survey with a group of youths in New Delhi and Mumbai about the Indian revolutionaries he was planning on depicting, which indicated that many of youngsters did not recognise the names of some of the most prominent revolutionaries. This led Mehra to believe that the sense of "patriotism had blurred" in the young generation. Because of this, he dropped his original plans in favour of a new idea in which a British documentary filmmaker on a visit to India realizes that the local "kids are more Western than her". This new story, which eventually formed the basis for Rang De Basanti's script, was influenced by Mehra's upbringing, youth and experiences over the years, including his desire to join the Indian Air Force while in school, as well as his recollections of listening to Independence Day speeches and watching patriotic films such as Mother India. Although Mehra denies that the film is autobiographical, he confessed that the character sketches were loosely inspired by himself and his friends.

Mehra approached Angad Paul after having been impressed with his production work on British films Lock, Stock and Two Smoking Barrels and Snatch. Paul, who was keen to work in India, liked Mehra's story and agreed to produce the film, bringing with him David Reid and Adam Bohling as executive producers. Despite having no prior knowledge of Hindi cinema, Reid and Bohling's belief in the script was strong enough that they each were willing to work at half their normal rate. While it was originally suggested that language versions of the film would be made concurrently, in English (as Paint it Yellow) and Hindi, the plans for an English version were dropped during development. Mehra believed that English-language version felt alien and that "one can tell a film in just one language". After the English version was dropped, the writer Kamlesh Pandey was brought on board to pen the first draft of Rang De Basanti in Hindi, marking the start of his screenwriting career. Thereafter Mehra and co-writer Rensil D'Silva took over the script, working on it for about two years. Prasoon Joshi, the film's lyricist, worked on the dialogue, marking his foray into screenwriting.

Rang De Basanti suffered a significant setback when one of the initial producers ultimately failed to contribute any funds towards it; the shortfall left production looking uncertain just two months away from the beginning of principal photography. However, after Aamir Khan agreed to act in the film, Mehra approached Ronnie Screwvala of UTV Motion Pictures with the script. Screwvala, who supported Mehra from the beginning of the production, had faith in the film, reasoning that in historical films, "the treatment and execution is very different from regular masala fare", and that such films "find favour with the audience owing to their elaborate sets and period costumes". The budget was reported as Rs. 250 million (approximately US$5.5 million), and, despite going a little over the initially planned budget, Mehra did not have any serious disagreements with UTV.

The film's script originally had a different climax, originally showing the protagonists on the run. The climax was rewritten, as the idea of them running away wasn't liked mutually, as they should have the last stand resembling that of Bhagat Singh. Years earlier, Khan had written his own story with the climax in a radio station, which he adapted for the climax of Rang De Basanti.

=== Casting ===
Aamir Khan agreed to act in Rang De Basanti immediately after reading Mehra's script. Mehra described his character as a simple man with a strong sense of integrity and dignity. Khan, who would turn 40 during the shoot, lost about 10 kilograms (22 lb) with a strict diet and exercise regime to more convincingly depict a man in his late twenties. Atul Kulkarni and Kunal Kapoor were publicly attached to the film by the time it was officially announced; Kapoor had been the assistant director to Mehra during the filming of Aks and was already familiar with the material Mehra had been developing. Mehra gave Kulkarni biographies of Ram Prasad Bismil as preparation, including Bismil's autobiography. Early rumours indicated that actors Arjun Rampal and Arjan Bajwa would be amongst the male leads, but these roles ultimately were filled by Siddharth and Sharman Joshi. Siddharth's role was offered to Farhan Akhtar and Abhishek Bachchan, both of whom refused. Mehra and Khan also offered Siddharth's role to Hrithik Roshan, but he declined in favour of Krrish (2006). Randeep Hooda also rejected the part as he did not want to play second lead to Aamir Khan. Shahid Kapoor was also offered a role in the film but had to decline due to a lack of dates. Daniel Craig was offered the role of James McKinley, but he could not do it as he was committed to Casino Royale (2006).

Rang De Basanti marked Siddharth's Bollywood debut, following on the success of his Telugu film Nuvvostanante Nenoddantana. Having previously worked as an assistant director, Siddharth praised Mehra as being "by far the most ambitious technical filmmaker in Indian cinema". R. Madhavan, despite being a well-known Tamil actor, took the smaller role of a fighter aircraft pilot because he was convinced of the film's potential and wanted to be a part of it. Shah Rukh Khan was offered the same role, but declined due to scheduling conflicts.

Soha Ali Khan and Alice Patten immediately became Mehra's clear favourites for each of their roles during casting, which led to Patten flying to Mumbai for a screen test with the entire cast. She was informed that she had won the documentary filmmaker role after she returned home to the United Kingdom. Soha, portraying the pilot's fiancée, was filming Rituparna Ghosh's Antarmahal and David Dhawan's comedy Shaadi No. 1 concurrently with her work in Rang De Basanti. In particular, the demands of her emotional scenes in Antarmahal often left her exhausted, thus requiring "a lot of personal overhauling" to ensure that her performance in Rang De Basanti was unaffected. During filming, reports indicated that co-stars Siddharth and Soha had become romantically involved with each other.

=== Filming ===
The film, which was shot in New Delhi, Mumbai, Rajasthan and Punjab, was officially launched at a hotel on 1 February 2005. When shooting began, Mehra made an announcement to his crew saying that they would enjoy their holiday only in July.

Instead of filming at the actual locations from the script, other locations were selected for picturisation. One such scene is where Soha Ali Khan is filmed at the India Habitat Center that masquerades as the University of Delhi. On similar lines, New Delhi's Modern School at Barakhamba Road served as the location for all the scenes pertinent to All India Radio station, which is shown to be stormed by the youngsters in the film. The Delhi Tourism department was happy to encourage filming in the city if it helped promote tourism, though any filming near India Gate was prohibited due to the ensuing bureaucratic paperwork. Similar issues with bureaucracy were faced by Mehra while filming at the Jaipur Fort. To use a historical location for filming, they had to seek permissions of seven officials ranging from the local police to the Archaeological Survey of India office. Nahargarh Fort, which oversees the city of Jaipur, was another such historical location where one of the songs was filmed. Doraha Fort, near Ludhiana or popularly known as the RDB fort got its moment of fame after a crucial scene from Rang De Basanti was shot here. Besides these locations, the filming was also done at Amritsar's Harmandir Sahib Gurudwara. For Aamir Khan, a Muslim, it was for the first time that he was playing a North Indian Punjabi character and it took him some time to get the right dialect and diction. While speaking about his experience of visiting the Gurudwara for the first time, he said:

It's one of the most peaceful places I've been to. As you enter the place there's a certain serenity that surrounds you. I really enjoyed being there. The first shot we took was of our feet entering the water just as you pass the doorway of the temple. The water was cold but it was great!

Once the locations were finalised, the team of Lovleen Bains and Arjun Bhasin was chosen for designing the look of Rang De Basanti. Bhasin had previously worked on Kama Sutra: A Tale of Love (1996) and Dil Chahta Hai (2001), the latter of which featured Aamir Khan, and he was referred to Mehra by Khan due to their previous association. Since the film's plot focused on men in their late twenties, Bhasin designed their look accordingly. Although he was responsible for Khan's rebellious look, Sharman Joshi's (who played Sukhi) lovable persona or Madhavan's dignified appearance, Bhasin credited Bains for her major contributions to the film. Khan's hair was styled by Avan Contractor, who came up with soft curls falling over Khan's forehead. This new look, which took Contractor one hour to come up with, surprised the audience at the film's launch.

In post-production, the visual effects were handled by Tata Elxsi's Visual Computing Labs. The military aircraft they created was so realistic that the Indian Air Force called to check the producer's permission of using an actual MiG-21.

== Controversy ==
On Rang De Basanti's release, the Film Certification Board of India sought the views of Indian Defence Ministry due to scenes that depicted the use of MiG-21 fighter aircraft. But after viewing the movie the ministry found no problems and allowed UTV to release the film. There were also some issues with Animal Welfare Board of India due to the banned Indian horse race.

== Music ==
The soundtrack of Rang De Basanti, which was released by Sony BMG, featured music composed by A. R. Rahman with lyrics penned by Prasoon Joshi and Blaaze, an India-based rapper. From the film's announcement in April 2005, Rahman was slated to compose the music. In a press conference with pop singer Nelly Furtado, he said that she was to originally have featured on the soundtrack, although this was ultimately prevented from happening due to a change in producers and other factors. Aamir Khan, with his knowledge of Hindi and Urdu, worked with Rahman and Joshi for the soundtrack. In addition, Mehra and Rahman chose him to sing for one of the songs.

Joshi was impressed with Mehra, who was ready to adjust to his style of writing as well as his creativity. Confessing that the film's soundtrack was his favourite out of all his previous works, Joshi felt that it "was a wonderful experience getting to know the mindset of today's youth and to pen down their feelings". Speaking about one of his songs, "Luka Chuppi", in which veteran Lata Mangeshkar sang with Rahman, Joshi said that it was developed while discussing with Rahman the scene about a mother losing her son. Joshi wrote the lyrics about the mother and son playing hide-and-seek with the sad reality of the son being hidden forever. He confessed to have been in tears while Mangeshkar was singing the song. The soundtrack won the Filmfare Award for Best Music Director, and had two of its tracks, Khalbali and Luka Chuppi, considered for an Academy Award for Best Original Song nomination.

While discussing typical Bollywood soundtracks, Nilanjana Bhattacharjya, a professor of music at Colorado College, noted that Rahman integrated traditional Punjabi cultural elements within his music for this soundtrack. Regionally defined elements such as a woman's prayer at the Sikh Gurdwara (Golden Temple) and the bhangra harvest dance are incorporated alongside more contemporary, global styles such as hard rock and hip hop to depict the cosmopolitan lifestyle of the youngsters in the film.

== Release ==
Rang De Basanti received its world premiere on 26 January 2006, with high expectations that it would be a success with western audiences, though it also faced ire from several organisations because of certain controversial scenes. The film contained scenes of a MiG-21, a controversial aircraft in the Indian Air Force, which has a long history of fatal accidents in India. Promptly, the Indian Defence Ministry raised concerns, causing the Indian censor board to urge the filmmakers to seek clearance from the ministry. Accordingly, Khan and Mehra screened the film for the then Defence Minister Pranab Mukherjee along with other top officials from the armed forces. One Air Force official reportedly said that it was "not a review, but a preview". After the special screening, the defence ministry did not insist on any cuts, but on their recommendation more names were added to the slide that dedicates the film to deceased MiG pilots. After this clearance, the Animal Welfare Board raised objections on the use of animals in the film. Although the filmmakers had obtained a No Objection Certificate from the board officials, Maneka Gandhi, a well-known animal rights activist and member of the welfare board, found flaws in this certificate. Subsequently, this certificate was revoked and with only a few days left for the world premiere, Mehra personally requested Gandhi to reconsider her objection. After another viewing, the board cleared their objection stating that the use of animals in the film was natural and justified. However, after they recommended the deletion of a 20-second scene that depicted a banned horse race conducted by the Nihang Sikhs, the filmmakers deleted this scene. Mrs. Kavita Gadgil whose son, late Flight Lieutenant Abhijeet Gadgil was killed when his MiG-21 fighter crashed, objected to the film's release because she believed that the film was loosely based on her son's life and the producers should have shown her the film. In response, Kamlesh Pandey, one of the writers of the film, said that the film was not inspired by Abhijeet Gadgil's life.

The film was screened at several international film festivals. In 2006, it premiered in France with the Lyon Asiexpo Film Festival, the Wisconsin Film Festival and the Morocco-based International Film Festival of Marrakech. As a part of the publicity, the cast, visited prominent University campuses in New Delhi, Mumbai, Kolkata, Hyderabad and Pune with an intention of interacting with the students. After hiring international experts for the film's publicity, the marketing expenditure for the film grew to 40 percent of the total production budget of ₹250 million (US$2.7 million). This expenditure was unprecedented in Bollywood because usually the Indian filmmakers spend only about five percent of their production budget on marketing. Out of the ₹100 million (US$1.1 million) marketing campaign, a fifth of it came from the producers while the rest was obtained through brand tie-ups and partnering.

There were high expectations from the soundtrack in the media. The soundtrack, first released commercially in early December 2005, generally received above average reviews. One of the songs, "Masti Ki Paatshaala" (translation: "Classroom of Fun"), was voted as the "Song of the year" for 2006 by leading Indian television channels, while two compositions were considered for an Academy Award nomination.

Before its theatrical release, the producers tied up with several top brands to help in the marketing the film. An alliance was formed with The Coca-Cola Company by releasing special edition bottles to commemorate the film's release, a first of its kind in Bollywood. Besides this, the music CDs and cassettes were co-branded with the cola company along with the launch of the sale of collectibles from the film. Provogue, a well-known clothing retail chain in India, launched a special limited edition clothing merchandise targeting the youth of India. Besides these, the producers collaborated with LG Group, Berger Paints, Bharti Airtel and Hindustan Petroleum. The producers tied up with several media partners such as MSN India, Channel V and Radio Mirchi to further enhance their marketing efforts. A video game launched by Mobile2win, an Indian mobile content company, was based on an adaptation of the film's plot.

In India, The Hindu reported that with audiences from the metropolitan cities turning out in large numbers, Rang De Basanti was notching up record collections in its opening week. Accordingly, 55 percent of the film's revenues came from multiplexes in these cities. While the opening week box-office collections from Mumbai, the home of Bollywood, were reported to be over ₹40 million (US$430,000), theatres in New Delhi earned about half of Mumbai's revenue. Throughout the country, the cumulative collections in the first week was about ₹80 million (US$850,000). Overseas collections from the United States, United Kingdom and Australia were collectively put at over ₹60 million (US$640,000) for the same week. Released in about 60 theatres in the United States, the film grossed ₹31 million (US$330,000) in its opening weekend and earned ₹99 million (US$1.1 million) within 10 weeks. With ₹1.23 billion (US$13 million) alone coming from the Indian territory, the film earned more than ₹1.36 billion (US$15 million) worldwide. Currently, the film holds the record for the highest-grossing film to be released in January. Inspired by the film, Pakistan's national newspaper, Jang, launched a television channel that was to focus on citizens' issues and support public awakening.

Within a week of the film's theatrical release, illegal copies of the film priced at ₹10 million (US$110,000) were seized at an Indian airport. A report carried out by The Times of India highlighted copyright infringement on the Internet where movies like Rang De Basanti could be downloaded freely. The DVD release sold more than 70,000 copies over six months, and as a result the film was the highest selling title at the time of its release.

Rang De Basanti was released on Blu-ray (plus steelbook edition) in May 2014. It is also available on Netflix.

== Reception ==
=== Critical reception ===
Critics gave the film an overwhelmingly positive response, in particular the ensemble cast's performance and credibility. Although The Indian Express spoke positively of the cinematography and the film's story, it noted that "the message that the film carries with it tends to get diluted towards the climax. Praising the film's cast for their performance and the cinematography of Binod Pradhan, Taran Adarsh wrote that the film would be successful with the urban audiences. The Hindustan Times summarised the film as being a "well-scripted, skilfully crafted [and] thought-provoking entertainer". Saisuresh Sivaswamy of Rediff.com wrote that films like Rang De Basanti can easily get into "preachiness", but believed Mehra got his message across while avoiding this, also appreciating the music, cinematography, dialogues and art direction. The Hindu credited Kamlesh Pandey for writing a story that would have been a difficult film to make, but it added by saying that the transformation of the youngsters into heroes seemed poetic. Although the screenplay, direction and the cast were also well-appreciated, the reviewer felt that Rahman's soundtrack lacked pace.

The film also received positive reviews from critics outside India. The review from the BBC gave it the highest possible five star rating and added that it was "an entertaining mix of romance, history and social commentary". The Bloomberg website wrote positively about "the raw energy of a young cast and A. R. Rahman's splendidly rousing soundtrack".

Sight & Sound magazine conducts a poll every ten years of the world's finest film directors to find out the Ten Greatest Films of All Time. This poll has been going since 1992, and has become the most recognised poll of its kind in the world. In 2012 Cyrus Frisch voted for "Rang De Basanti". Frisch commented: "Corruption became the subject of fierce debate in India after the major success of this film among youngsters."

The film was mentioned in critic and author Shubhra Gupta's book, 50 Films That Changed Bollywood, 1995–2015.

=== Climax ===
A major point of criticism the film faced was regarding the possibility of the Indian Army attacking students in a radio station. When Rakeysh was questioned about the same in a scriptwriter's conference conducted by the Film Writers Association in the year 2008, he said the following, "So, in 2005, in Allahabad, a bunch of 4 students took the TV station there, and they were shot dead. Everything I did, it was kind of borrowed, as I said right here. Obviously, what I am also learning is the way I tell a story is not real; you can term it as a-real. For maximum impact, for the message to go through, I felt—since the story was against the establishment—let the establishment do it. After all, the establishment did hang Bhagat Singh. After all, the establishment did come down on the innocent, innocent students in Mandal Commission. After all the establishment did come down on Tiananmen Square. After all the establishment did come down when the whole concept of Flower Power emerged in America. So it's all there. It's borrowed, maybe not as realistically, but it is definitely there in the society. During emergency, there are horror stories. If we have to go back to Kriplani and his movement in Bihar, the stories are absolutely horrific."

=== 2007 Academy Awards Best Foreign Film submission ===
Since the film "reflected contemporary Indian reality and had cinematic excellence", it was chosen as India's official entry for the 79th Academy Awards despite stiff competition from films such as Krrish, Omkara, Kabhi Alvida Naa Kehna and Lage Raho Munna Bhai. While discussing if the selection committee's choice was correct, critics felt that the academy members could have better related with Omkara, an adaptation of Shakespeare's play Othello. Despite these qualms and Mehra's belief that his film did not stand a chance at the Oscars, the efforts to publicise the film in the United States began earnestly. Music composer A. R. Rahman performed several concerts across the East Coast to promote the film. Besides his efforts, producer Screwvala planned to use resources and expertise from his partners in 20th Century Fox and Walt Disney Pictures for organising its publicity efforts. When the nominations in the foreign film category did not feature this film, it sparked off debates on whether the film should have been India's entry for the Oscars. In one such debate on a television channel that involved Screwvala, the selection committee was questioned about its knowledge of the requisite artistic criteria for such award ceremonies. While one outcome of the debate was on how Omkara would have been a better choice, the other discussed the West-centric sensibilities of the academy members. However, results from a simultaneously conducted SMS poll indicated that 62 percent felt that the film was the right choice for the Oscars.

== Accolades ==
List of accolades received by Rang De Basanti
Accolades
Award	Won	Nominated
Bollywood Movie Awards	4	10
British Academy Film Awards	0	1
Filmfare Awards	6	21
Global Indian Film Awards	7	13
International Indian Film Academy Awards	12	22
National Film Awards	4	4
Screen Awards	8	18
Stardust Awards	2	7
Zee Cine Awards	7	22
- Total number of awards and nominations (Note: Awards in certain categories do not have prior nominations and only winners are announced by the jury. For simplification and to avoid errors, each award in this list has been presumed to have had a prior nomination.)
Totals	50	112
- References

The film was selected as India's official entry to the 79th Academy Awards for Best Foreign Language Film but it was not Nominated.

Award (Note: Awards, festivals and organizations are in alphabetical order.)	Date of ceremony (Note: Date is linked to the article about the awards held that year, wherever possible.)	Category	Recipient(s)	Result	Ref.
Bollywood Movie Awards	26 May 2007	Best Director	Rakeysh Omprakash Mehra	Nominated	
Bollywood Movie Awards	26 May 2007	Best Actor	Aamir Khan	Nominated	
Bollywood Movie Awards	26 May 2007	Best Supporting Actor	Kunal Kapoor	Nominated	
Bollywood Movie Awards	26 May 2007	Best Supporting Actress	Kirron Kher	Won	
Bollywood Movie Awards	26 May 2007	Best Supporting Actress	Soha Ali Khan	Nominated	
Bollywood Movie Awards	26 May 2007	Best Music Director	A. R. Rahman	Nominated	
Bollywood Movie Awards	26 May 2007	Best Female Playback Singer	Madhushree – (for song "Tu Bin Bataayein")	Nominated	
Bollywood Movie Awards	26 May 2007	Best Screenplay	Rakeysh Omprakash Mehra & Rensil D'Silva	Won	
Bollywood Movie Awards	26 May 2007	Best Editing	P. S. Bharathi	Won	
Bollywood Movie Awards	26 May 2007	Best Art Direction	Samir Chanda	Won	
British Academy Film Awards	11 February 2007	Best Film Not in the English Language	Ronnie Screwvala & Rakeysh Omprakash Mehra	Nominated	
Filmfare Awards	17 February 2007	Best Film	Ronnie Screwvala & Rakeysh Omprakash Mehra	Won	
Filmfare Awards	17 February 2007	Best Director	Rakeysh Omprakash Mehra	Won	
Filmfare Awards	17 February 2007	Best Actor	Aamir Khan	Nominated	
Filmfare Awards	17 February 2007	Best Actor (Critics)	Aamir Khan	Won	
Filmfare Awards	17 February 2007	Best Supporting Actor	Kunal Kapoor	Nominated	
Filmfare Awards	17 February 2007	Best Supporting Actor	Siddharth	Nominated	
Filmfare Awards	17 February 2007	Best Supporting Actress	Kirron Kher	Nominated	
Filmfare Awards	17 February 2007	Best Supporting Actress	Soha Ali Khan	Nominated	
Filmfare Awards	17 February 2007	Best Music Director	A. R. Rahman	Won	
Filmfare Awards	17 February 2007	Best Background Score	A. R. Rahman	Nominated	
Filmfare Awards	17 February 2007	Best Lyricist	Prasoon Joshi – (for song "Roobaroo")	Nominated	
Filmfare Awards	17 February 2007	Best Choreography	Ganesh Acharya – (for song "Masti Ki Paathshaala")	Nominated	
Filmfare Awards	17 February 2007	Best Story	Kamlesh Pandey	Nominated	
Filmfare Awards	17 February 2007	Best Screenplay	Rakeysh Omprakash Mehra & Rensil D'Silva	Nominated	
Filmfare Awards	17 February 2007	Best Dialogue	Prasoon Joshi	Nominated	
Filmfare Awards	17 February 2007	Best Cinematography	Binod Pradhan	Won	
Filmfare Awards	17 February 2007	Best Editing	P. S. Bharathi	Won	
Filmfare Awards	17 February 2007	Best Art Direction	Samir Chanda	Nominated	
Filmfare Awards	17 February 2007	Best Costume Design	Arjun Bhasin & Lovleen Bains	Nominated	
Filmfare Awards	17 February 2007	Best Sound Design	Nakul Kamre	Nominated	
Filmfare Awards	17 February 2007	Best Special Effects	Pankaj Khandpur	Nominated	
Global Indian Film Awards	7–9 December 2006	Best Film	Ronnie Screwvala & Rakeysh Omprakash Mehra	Nominated	
Global Indian Film Awards	7–9 December 2006	Best Director	Rakeysh Omprakash Mehra	Won	
Global Indian Film Awards	7–9 December 2006	Best Actor	Aamir Khan	Nominated	
Global Indian Film Awards	7–9 December 2006	Best Supporting Actor	Atul Kulkarni	Nominated	
Global Indian Film Awards	7–9 December 2006	Best Supporting Actress	Alice Patten	Nominated	
Global Indian Film Awards	7–9 December 2006	Best Supporting Actress	Soha Ali Khan	Won	
Global Indian Film Awards	7–9 December 2006	Best Music Director	A. R. Rahman	Won	
Global Indian Film Awards	7–9 December 2006	Best Background Score	A. R. Rahman	Won	
Global Indian Film Awards	7–9 December 2006	Best Lyricist	Prasoon Joshi – (for song "Roobaroo")	Won	
Global Indian Film Awards	7–9 December 2006	Best Female Playback Singer	Madhushree – (for song "Tu Bin Bataayein")	Nominated	
Global Indian Film Awards	7–9 December 2006	Best Screenplay	Rakeysh Omprakash Mehra & Rensil D'Silva	Won	
Global Indian Film Awards	7–9 December 2006	Best Editing	P. S. Bharathi	Won	
Global Indian Film Awards	7–9 December 2006	Best Art Direction	Samir Chanda	Won	
International Indian Film Academy Awards	7–9 June 2007	Best Film	Ronnie Screwvala & Rakeysh Omprakash Mehra	Won	
International Indian Film Academy Awards	7–9 June 2007	Best Director	Rakeysh Omprakash Mehra	Won	
International Indian Film Academy Awards	7–9 June 2007	Best Actor	Aamir Khan	Nominated	
International Indian Film Academy Awards	7–9 June 2007	Best Supporting Actor	Atul Kulkarni	Nominated	
International Indian Film Academy Awards	7–9 June 2007	Best Supporting Actor	Kunal Kapoor	Nominated	
International Indian Film Academy Awards	7–9 June 2007	Best Supporting Actress	Kirron Kher	Nominated	
International Indian Film Academy Awards	7–9 June 2007	Best Supporting Actress	Soha Ali Khan	Won	
International Indian Film Academy Awards	7–9 June 2007	Best Performance in a Comic Role	Sharman Joshi	Nominated	
International Indian Film Academy Awards	7–9 June 2007	Best Music Director	A. R. Rahman	Won	
International Indian Film Academy Awards	7–9 June 2007	Best Background Score	A. R. Rahman	Won	
International Indian Film Academy Awards	7–9 June 2007	Best Song Recording	A. R. Rahman	Won	
International Indian Film Academy Awards	7–9 June 2007	Best Lyricist	Prasoon Joshi – (for song "Roobaroo")	Nominated	
International Indian Film Academy Awards	7–9 June 2007	Best Male Playback Singer	A. R. Rahman & Naresh Iyer – (for song "Roobaroo")	Nominated	
International Indian Film Academy Awards	7–9 June 2007	Best Female Playback Singer	Lata Mangeshkar – (for song "Luka Chhupi")	Nominated	
International Indian Film Academy Awards	7–9 June 2007	Best Story	Kamlesh Pandey	Nominated	
International Indian Film Academy Awards	7–9 June 2007	Best Screenplay	Rakeysh Omprakash Mehra & Rensil D'Silva	Won	
International Indian Film Academy Awards	7–9 June 2007	Best Dialogue	Prasoon Joshi	Nominated	
International Indian Film Academy Awards	7–9 June 2007	Best Cinematography	Binod Pradhan	Won	
International Indian Film Academy Awards	7–9 June 2007	Best Editing	P. S. Bharathi	Won	
International Indian Film Academy Awards	7–9 June 2007	Best Art Direction	Samir Chanda	Won	
International Indian Film Academy Awards	7–9 June 2007	Best Sound Recording	Nakul Kamre	Won	
International Indian Film Academy Awards	7–9 June 2007	Best Sound Re-Recording	Hitendra Gosh	Won	
National Film Awards	14 September 2007	Best Popular Film Providing Wholesome Entertainment	Ronnie Screwvala & Rakeysh Omprakash Mehra	Won	
National Film Awards	14 September 2007	Best Male Playback Singer	Naresh Iyer – (for song "Roobaroo")	Won	
National Film Awards	14 September 2007	Best Editing	P. S. Bharathi	Won	
National Film Awards	14 September 2007	Best Audiography	Nakul Kamre	Won	
Screen Awards	6 January 2007	Best Film	Ronnie Screwvala & Rakeysh Omprakash Mehra	Nominated	
Screen Awards	6 January 2007	Best Director	Rakeysh Omprakash Mehra	Won	
Screen Awards	6 January 2007	Best Actor	Aamir Khan	Nominated	
Screen Awards	6 January 2007	Best Supporting Actor	Atul Kulkarni	Nominated	
Screen Awards	6 January 2007	Best Supporting Actor	Kunal Kapoor	Nominated	
Screen Awards	6 January 2007	Best Supporting Actor	Sharman Joshi	Nominated	
Screen Awards	6 January 2007	Best Supporting Actress	Kirron Kher	Won	
Screen Awards	6 January 2007	Best Male Debut	Siddharth	Won	
Screen Awards	6 January 2007	Best Music Director	A. R. Rahman	Nominated	
Screen Awards	6 January 2007	Best Background Score	A. R. Rahman	Won	
Screen Awards	6 January 2007	Best Story	Kamlesh Pandey	Nominated	
Screen Awards	6 January 2007	Best Screenplay	Rakeysh Omprakash Mehra & Rensil D'Silva	Won	
Screen Awards	6 January 2007	Best Dialogue	Prasoon Joshi	Nominated	
Screen Awards	6 January 2007	Best Editing	P. S. Bharathi	Nominated	
Screen Awards	6 January 2007	Best Cinematography	Binod Pradhan	Won	
Screen Awards	6 January 2007	Best Art Direction	Samir Chanda	Won	
Screen Awards	6 January 2007	Best Sound Design	Nakul Kamre	Won	
Screen Awards	6 January 2007	Best Choreography	Ganesh Acharya – (for song "Masti Ki Paathshaala")	Nominated	
Stardust Awards	18 February 2007	Dream Director	Rakeysh Omprakash Mehra	Nominated	
Stardust Awards	18 February 2007	Breakthrough Performance – Male	Kunal Kapoor	Won	
Stardust Awards	18 February 2007	Best Supporting Actress	Kirron Kher	Nominated	
Stardust Awards	18 February 2007	Superstar of Tomorrow – Male	Siddharth	Nominated	
Stardust Awards	18 February 2007	Superstar of Tomorrow – Female	Soha Ali Khan	Nominated	
Stardust Awards	18 February 2007	New Musical Sensation – Male	Naresh Iyer – (for song "Masti Ki Paathshaala")	Nominated	
Stardust Awards	18 February 2007	Pride of the Industry	Rang De Basanti – Rakeysh Omprakash Mehra	Won	
Zee Cine Awards	1 April 2007	Best Film	Ronnie Screwvala & Rakeysh Omprakash Mehra	Won	
Zee Cine Awards	1 April 2007	Best Director	Rakeysh Omprakash Mehra	Won	
Zee Cine Awards	1 April 2007	Best Actor – Male	Aamir Khan	Nominated	
Zee Cine Awards	1 April 2007	Best Actor in a Supporting Role – Male	Atul Kulkarni	Nominated	
Zee Cine Awards	1 April 2007	Best Actor in a Supporting Role – Male	Siddharth	Nominated	
Zee Cine Awards	1 April 2007	Best Male Debut	Siddharth	Nominated	
Zee Cine Awards	1 April 2007	Best Actor in a Supporting Role – Female	Kirron Kher	Nominated	
Zee Cine Awards	1 April 2007	Best Actor in a Supporting Role – Female	Soha Ali Khan	Nominated	
Zee Cine Awards	1 April 2007	Best Music Director	A. R. Rahman	Won	
Zee Cine Awards	1 April 2007	Best Background Score	A. R. Rahman	Nominated	
Zee Cine Awards	1 April 2007	Best Lyricist	Prasoon Joshi – (for song "Masti Ki Paathshaala")	Won	
Zee Cine Awards	1 April 2007	Best Story	Kamlesh Pandey	Nominated	
Zee Cine Awards	1 April 2007	Best Screenplay	Rakeysh Omprakash Mehra & Rensil D'Silva	Nominated	
Zee Cine Awards	1 April 2007	Best Dialogue	Prasoon Joshi	Nominated	
Zee Cine Awards	1 April 2007	Best Editing	P. S. Bharathi	Won	
Zee Cine Awards	1 April 2007	Best Cinematography	Binod Pradhan	Won	
Zee Cine Awards	1 April 2007	Best Art Direction	Samir Chanda	Nominated	
Zee Cine Awards	1 April 2007	Best Audiography	Nakul Kamre	Nominated	
Zee Cine Awards	1 April 2007	Best Special Effects (Visual)	Brynley Cadman	Nominated	
Zee Cine Awards	1 April 2007	Best Choreography	Ganesh Acharya – (for song "Masti Ki Paathshaala")	Nominated	
Zee Cine Awards	1 April 2007	Best Track of the Year	A. R. Rahman – (for song "Rang De Basanti")	Nominated	
Zee Cine Awards	1 April 2007	Zenith Power Team Award	Rang De Basanti (Note: Shared with Lage Raho Munna Bhai.)	Won	

== Social influence ==
A pictorial collage that showcases how the Indian brands have used pictorials from the film (clockwise from top: Tehelka's second-anniversary magazine, a Business & Economy periodical and Amul – a dairy products manufacturer).

Rang De Basanti had a noticeable impact on Indian society. A study of bloggers behavioural patterns during the first month of the film's release revealed a significant increase in public ire towards government and politicians for constantly being mired in corruption and bureaucracy and their inefficiency in providing basic amenities. Intense political discussions spurred on by the film's influence were observed in these patterns. While commenting on this, writer D'Silva said that the film "has struck a chord somewhere". Besides instigating political thought and discussions, it evoked social awakening for many. Some discussions rallied on how citizens should support and contribute to non-governmental organisations and exercising simple citizen duties of paying taxes and voting, while the others contemplated on how to become more responsible towards the country. Unlike other Indian films with jingoistic overtones, many young Indians could relate well to the characters of this film.

While such reactions were observed on the Internet, youth activism took to streets to protest on public interest issues. A direct impact was on the 1999 Jessica Lall Murder Case, one of the high-profile murder cases in India. A month after the film's release, a court acquitted the main accused because of inefficient prosecution and hostile witnesses. This sparked intense civil protests and media campaigns that sought his re-arrest. Taking cue from the scene in which the protagonists hold a silent, candlelight vigil at New Delhi's India Gate, one such group of demonstrators carried out a similar rally to voice their protest. Shortly thereafter, a survey was conducted to assess reasons for the sudden upsurge in people's social involvements. Eighteen percent of the respondents felt that movies like Rang De Basanti were the main reason behind it. Another such massive youth activism was seen in the Priyadarshini Mattoo rape and murder case where similar rallies were organised in India, United States and around the world. Following the release of the film, another social outcry was against the introduction of reservations for socially backward classes in educational institutions. Young doctors and engineers joined hands in peaceful rallies in major cities across India. Though the film was not released in the neighbouring Pakistan, it evoked similar reactions there. Inspired by the film, Pakistan's national newspaper, Jang, launched a television channel that was to focus on citizens' issues and support public awakening. Reacting to these strong social reactions, actor Kunal Kapoor thought that the film was just a catalyst that presented "patriotism in a package that the youngsters understood and empathised with".

In the Indian media, frequent referencing of the film was evident, with many brands using pictorials from the movie. In addition, the media also uses the terms "RDB" (abbreviated title of the movie) and "RDB effect" while referring to instances of public activism on matters of public interest. When the 2007 University of Delhi Student Elections focused more on the important issues facing the students than in the previous years, one student referred to this as the "RDB Syndrome". On similar lines, Kamal Sunavala wrote a play titled Under the Influence which focuses on a young Indian expatriate whose life changes after watching this film.
