= Nagra Jhansi =

- Town
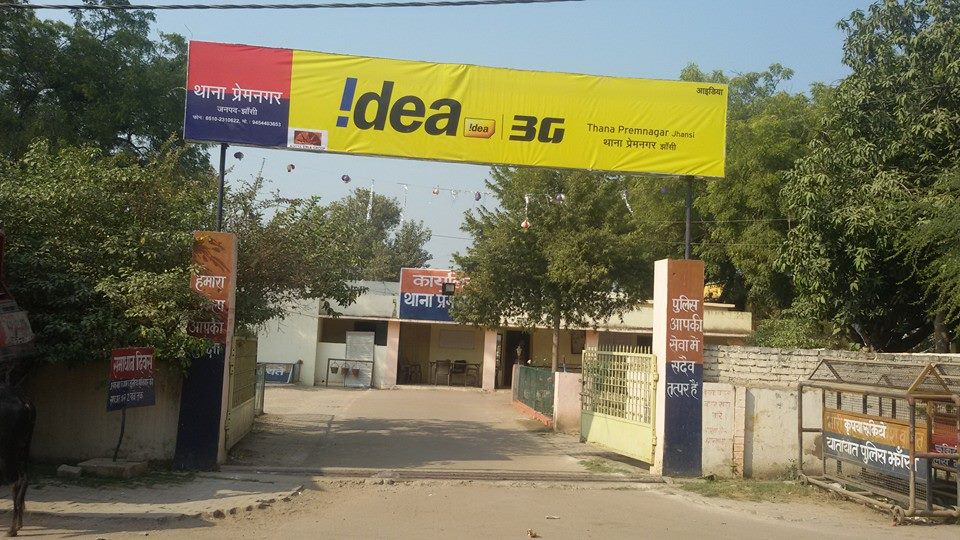
- Nickname: Prem Nagar
- Location in Uttar Pradesh, India Nagra Jhansi (India)
- Coordinates: 25.2520°N 78.3205°E
- Country: India
- State: Uttar Pradesh
- District: Jhansi

Government
  - Type: Nagar Nigam Jhansi

Population
  - Total: 150,000 above

Languages
  - Official: Hindi
- Time zone: UTC+5:30 (IST)
- PIN: 284003
- Vehicle registration: UP 93
- Website: jhansi.nic.in

Nagra is a locality in Jhansi Nagar Nigam in the state of Uttar Pradesh in India. It is part of Bundelkhand geographic region and the preferred dialect here is Bundelkhandi. Main population of Nagra consists of railway employees and daily wage earning community.

== Geography ==
Nagra is located at 25.2520°N 78.3205°E. It has an average elevation of 210 metres (692 feet).

== Education ==
Most of the schools are affiliated to UP board.

=== Schools ===
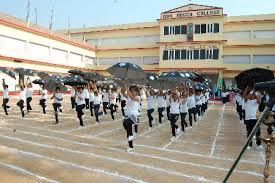
Don Bosco College

- Saint Umar Inter College, Jhansi
- Dr. B. R. Ambedkar Science Inter College
- Janak Inter College
- Don Bosco College
- M. S. Rajput Inter College
- St. Jude's Inter College
- Kastorba Kanya Inter College

=== Colleges ===
- Swami Vivekanand College

== Facilities and communication ==
=== Transport ===
Main modes of transport are autos and private cabs. The nearest station available is Jhansi railway station. The town is well connected by Shivpuri highway and Lalitpur highway.

=== Factories and workshops ===
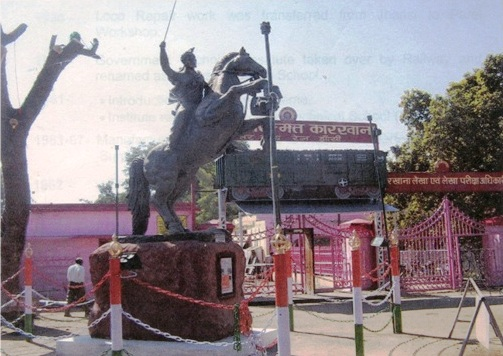
Jhansi Railway Workshop Main Gate; note equestrian statue of Rani Lakshmibai

- Railway Workshop
- Railway Coach Factory

=== Police stations ===
Nagra (Premnagar) is the nearest police station. Apart from this there are many general railway police (GRP) police stations as this area mainly consists of Railway property.

=== Cinema ===
- Bhusan Cinema Hall
