= Water (soundtrack) =

Film score by A. R. Rahman and Mychael Danna
- Released: 20 December 2005
- Recorded: Panchathan Record Inn; A.M. Studios
- Genre: Feature film soundtrack, Film score
- Label: Sony BMG (India); Varèse Sarabande (International)
- Producer: A. R. Rahman

A. R. Rahman chronology
Anbe Aaruyire (2005)	Water (2005)	Rang De Basanti (2005)

Mychael Danna chronology
Capote (2005)	Water (2005)	Tideland (2005)

Water is the soundtrack to the 2005 film of the same name. It was released on 20 December 2005 by labels Sony BMG in India and Varèse Sarabande internationally. The songs were composed by A. R. Rahman and the background score of the film was composed by Mychael Danna.

== Overview ==
The album has 21 songs in total, 15 Instrumental pieces by Mychael Danna and 6 Hindi songs composed by A. R. Rahman with lyrics by Sukhwinder Singh and Raqeeb Alam, except for the song Vaishnava Janatho (which is a famous 15th century bhajan in Gujarati composed and lyricized by Narsinh Mehta). However, A. R. Rahman introduced new orchestration with new singers. The soundtrack was released by international label, Varèse Sarabande but it is distributed in India by Sony BMG. The Indian release contains only the 6 Hindi songs composed by A.R. Rahman. Rahman has rated this as his only album which he would give a 10/10. The song Aayo Re Sakhi (Chan Chan) was considered for the Best Original Song nomination in the 2007 Academy Awards.

== Track listing ==
=== Indian Release ===
Track list
No.	Title	Lyrics	Music	Singer(s)	Length
1.	"Aayo Re Sakhi"	Sukhwinder Singh	A. R. Rahman	Sadhana Sargam, Sukhwinder Singh	5:16
2.	"Piya Ho"	Sukhwinder Singh	A. R. Rahman	Sadhana Sargam, Sukhwinder Singh	6:02
3.	"Naina Neer Bahaye"	Sukhwinder Singh	A. R. Rahman	Sadhana Sargam	5:19
4.	"Sham Rang Bhar Do"	Raqeeb Alam	A. R. Rahman	Richa Sharma, Raqeeb Alam, Surjo Bhattacharya	5:10
5.	"Vaishnava Janatho"	Narsinh Mehta	A. R. Rahman,(originally composed by Narsinh Mehta)	Ajoy Chakraborty, Kaushiki Chakraborty, Chorus	3:03
6.	"Bhangari Marori"	Sukhwinder Singh	A. R. Rahman	Sukhwinder Singh	4:46

=== International Release ===
Track list
No.	Title	Lyrics	Music	Singer(s)	Length
1.	"House Of Widows"	-	Mychael Danna	Instrumental	5:19
2.	"Chuyia Explores"	-	Mychael Danna	Instrumental	1:42
3.	"Where Is She?"	-	Mychael Danna	Instrumental	0:58
4.	"Aayo Re Sakhi"	Sukhwinder Singh	A. R. Rahman	Sadhana Sargam, Sukhwinder Singh	5:16
5.	"Kaalu"	-	Mychael Danna	Instrumental	2:28
6.	"Can't Go Home"	-	Mychael Danna	Instrumental	1:11
7.	"Piya Ho"	Sukhwinder Singh	A. R. Rahman	Sadhana Sargam, Sukhwinder Singh	6:02
8.	"Ladoo Dreams"	-	Mychael Danna	Instrumental	1:11
9.	"Funeral"	-	Mychael Danna	Instrumental	0:59
10.	"Carriage"	-	Mychael Danna	Instrumental	2:06
11.	"Fatty"	-	Mychael Danna	Instrumental	0:52
12.	"Naina Neer Bahaye"	Sukhwinder Singh	A. R. Rahman	Sadhana Sargam	5:19
13.	"Kalyani Leaves"	-	Mychael Danna	Instrumental	2:21
14.	"Sham Rang Bhar Do"	Raqeeb Alam	A. R. Rahman	Richa Sharma, Raqeeb Alam, Surjo Bhattacharya	5:10
15.	"Turn The Boat Around"	-	Mychael Danna	Instrumental	1:33
16.	"Walk Into River"	-	Mychael Danna	Instrumental	2:55
17.	"Chuyia Is Gone"	-	Mychael Danna	Instrumental	2:35
18.	"Vaishnava Janatho"	Narsinh Mehta	A. R. Rahman (originally composed by Narsinh Mehta)	Ajoy Chakraborty, Kaushiki Chakraborty, Chorus	3:03
19.	"Train"	-	Mychael Danna	Instrumental	3:28
20.	"Across The River"	-	Mychael Danna	Instrumental	5:35
21.	"Bhangari Marori"	Sukhwinder Singh	A. R. Rahman	Sukhwinder Singh	4:46
