= Sadar Bazar Jhansi =

Sadar Bazar
- Town
- Location in Uttar Pradesh, India
- Coordinates: 25.2620°N 78.3455°E
- Country: India
- State: Uttar Pradesh
- District: Jhansi
- Founder: Britishers

Government
  - Type: Uttar Pradesh
  - Body: Cantonment Board

Languages
  - Official: Hindi
- Time zone: UTC+5:30 (IST)
- PIN: 284001
- Vehicle registration: UP 93

Sadar Bazar is located in the heart of Jhansi. The market is under the control and supervision of cantonment board. It is the central shopping place for the local people. There are various types of stores located in this bazar like garment stores, electronic stores, food stalls and others. It is a planned market and is full of life. There is too much rush in the evening and the place is mostly crowded at night time.
