= Women of the Indian independence movement =

The Indian independence movement was a series of events aimed at ending the British rule in India, which lasted till 1947. Women played a significant and prominent role in the Indian independence movement. The participation of women in the movement started as early as the eighteenth century.

== Prominent women ==
- Rani Velu Nachiya – The First Indian Queen to Fight the British. Rani Velu Nachiyar (3 January 1730 – 25 December 1796) was the queen of the Sivaganga estate in Tamil Nadu, ruling from around 1780 to 1790. She holds the historic distinction of being one of the earliest Indian monarchs to launch an armed resistance against the British East India Company, long before the Revolt of 1857.One of the most dramatic events during her campaign was when her commander Kuyili, a close aide, performed a suicide attack by setting herself ablaze and destroying the British ammunition store. This act is believed to be the earliest known instance of a human bomb in recorded history. She is affectionately and reverently known in Tamil as "Veeramangai" (வீரமங்கை) — meaning "brave woman".
- Anjana Devi Chaudhary (1897 – 27 April 1981) was an Indian freedom fighter, writer, and social activist from Sikar, Rajasthan. She is recognised as the first woman from Rajasthan to be arrested by the britishers during the Indian independence movement. Her contributions to the independence movement and women’s empowerment remain significant in Indian history. She was deeply involved with the Indian National Congress and became a key figure in the Civil Disobedience Movement. Between 1921 and 1924, she worked to raise political awareness among women. In 1930, she was jailed twice for her participation in the movement.
- Annie Besant (1 October 1847 – 20 September 1933) was a British born socialist, theosophist, women's rights activist and campaigner for Indian nationalism. She was an ardent supporter of the Indian self-rule and became the first female president of the Indian National Congress in 1917. She and Henry Steel Olcott led the Theosophical Society Adyar based in Chennai.
- Aruna Asaf Ali (16 July 1909 – 29 July 1996) was an educator, political activist, and publisher. An active participant in the Indian independence movement, she is widely remembered for hoisting the Indian National flag at the Gowalia Tank maidan, Bombay during the Quit India Movement in 1942. Post-independence, she remained active in politics, becoming Delhi's first Mayor.
- Avantibai (16 August 1831 – 20 March 1858) was a queen of the Ramgarh. An opponent of the British East India Company during the Indian Rebellion of 1857, Avantibai led an army against the British in the battle near the village of Khairi near Mandla, where she was able to defeat the British. However, following renewed attacks on Ramgarh, she moved to the hills of Devharigarh from where she fought a guerilla warfare later.
- Jhalkaribai (22 November 1830 – 5 April 1858) was a woman soldier who played an important role in the Indian Rebellion of 1857. She served in the women's army of Rani Lakshmibai of Jhansi and eventually rose to a position of a prominent advisor to the queen, Rani of Jhansi. At the height of the Siege of Jhansi, she disguised herself as the queen and fought on her behalf, on the front, allowing the queen to escape safely out of the fort. She died during the battle.
- Kasturba Gandhi (11 April 1869 – 22 February 1944) was a social activist who often fought alongside her husband Gandhi. In 1904, Kasturba Gandhi began her work in politics and social activism in South Africa where she helped establish a settlement near Durban, a cooperative village where residents shared chores and grew their own food. In 1913, she was arrested and sentenced to three months in prison for participating in a protest against the treatment of Indian immigrants in South Africa. Upon return to India, Kasturba participated in numerous civil actions and protests, often taking her husband's place when he was in prison. In 1917, Kasturba worked to empower the lives of farmers in Champaran, Bihar. In 1922, she participated in a nonviolent civil disobedience (satyagraha) movement in Gujarat. She participated in a number of civil disobedience campaigns in the early 1930s and was arrested and jailed several times. In early 1939, she participated in nonviolent protests against the British in Rajkot after which she was arrested and kept in solitary confinement, during which her health further deteriorated. In 1942, she was arrested again for participating in the Quit India movement and was imprisoned in Pune. While in prison her chronic bronchitis worsened and she contracted pneumonia which led to her death in early 1944.
- Kittur Chennamma (23 October 1778 – 21 February 1829) was a queen of Kittur, a former princely state in present-day Karnataka. In 1823-29, she led an armed resistance against the British East India Company, in defiance of the Paramountcy, in an attempt to retain control over her dominion. She defeated the company forces in the first war in 1824 but died as a prisoner of war after the second rebellion in 1829.
- Pritilata Waddedar (5 May 1911 – 24 September 1932) was an independence activist from East Bengal. In 1932, she was part of a group of activists led by Surya Sen who went on an assault on the Pahartali European club at Chittagong. In the assault, she was shot and she committed suicide later to avoid getting captured.
- Rani Lakshmibai (19 November 1828 — 18 June 1858) was the queen consort of Jhansi State, a princely state of Jhansi in the Maratha Empire. When her husband Maharaja Gangadhar Rao died in 1853, the British East India Company under Governor-General Dalhousie refused to recognize the claim of his adopted heir and annexed Jhansi under the Doctrine of Lapse. Lakshmibai was unwilling to cede control of the territory and joined the rebellion against the British in 1857. She was proclaimed as the regent of Jhansi on behalf of her minor son and led the successful defense of Jhansi against the company and its allies. She fought along with another rebel leader Tantia Tope before Jhansi fell to British forces under the command of Hugh Rose in early 1858. She managed to escape on a horseback and joined the rebel forces to attack and capture Gwalior, where they proclaimed Nana Saheb as Peshwa of the revived Maratha Empire. She died in June 1858 after being mortally wounded during the British counterattack at Gwalior.
- Rukmini Lakshmipathi (6 December 1892 – 6 August 1951) was an independence activist belonging to the Indian National Congress. For her participation in the Salt Satyagraha in Vedaranyam in 1930, she was jailed for a year, becoming the first female prisoner in the salt satyagraha movement. She was the first woman to be elected to the Madras Legislature in 1937 and the first woman to serve as a minister in the Madras Presidency.
- Sarojini Naidu (13 February 1879 – 2 March 1949) was a poet and an independence activist. She was hailed as the "Nightingale of India" for her lyrical and oratory prowess. Naidu wrote poetry predominantly in English, which usually took the form of lyric poetry and known for her use of the depictions of India in her writings. After a three-year stint in England from 1895 to 1898, Naidu became involved in the Indian Independence movement and various women’s causes tied to the nationalist movement, such as women’s suffrage. She spoke on its behalf in public forums around the world as an ambassador and spokeswoman of Indian nationalism. Naidu also acted in an official capacity as the first female Indian president of the Indian National Congress in 1925 and the appointed governor of the United Provinces in 1947.
- Sucheta Kripalani (25 June 1908 – 1 December 1974) was a freedom fighter and politician, who was India's first female Chief Minister, serving as the head of the Government of Uttar Pradesh from 1963 to 1967. She came to the forefront during the Quit India Movement and was arrested by British. On 14 August 1947, she sang Vande Mataram in the Independence Session of the Constituent Assembly a few minutes before Nehru delivered his famous "Tryst with Destiny" speech.
- Usha Mehta (25 March 1920 – 11 August 2000) was a Gandhian and freedom fighter. She is known for organizing the Congress Radio, an underground radio station, which functioned during the Quit India Movement of 1942.
