= Naujawan Bharat Sabha =

Indian revolution organization

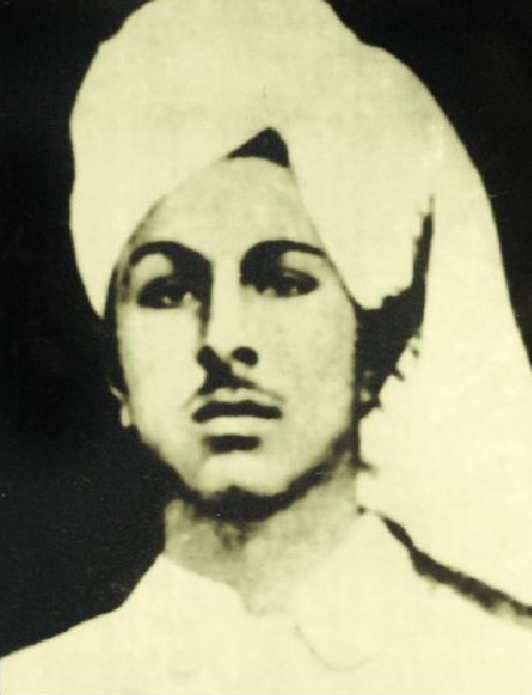
Bhagat Singh

Naujawan Bharat Sabha (NBS, sometimes spelled Nau Jawan Bharat Sabha , with the acronym NJBS) (transl. Youth Society of India) was a left-wing Indian association that sought to foment revolution against the British Raj by gathering together worker and peasant youths by disseminating Marxist ideas. It was founded by Bhagat Singh (General secretary) and Ramchandra (President) in March 1926 and was a more public face of the Hindustan Republican Association. The organization merged with All India Youth Federation (AIYF) of Communist Party of India.

The NBS comprised members from the Hindu, Muslim and Sikh communities and organized lectures, public meetings and protests. It did not gain widespread support because of its radical ideas relating to religion and to agrarian reform. Attendance at its public meetings became particularly popular after the killing of John P. Saunders in December 1928. This killing, by Singh and others, followed from a protest against the Simon Commission in Lahore of which the NBS had been one of the organizing parties. Contemporary opinion was that non-cooperation was preferable to violence as a means of achieving change.

The association was banned in July 1929 during a period when the government had imposed Section 144 to control gatherings as public support burgeoned for the imprisoned Singh and his fellow hunger-strikers. NBS members were involved in the campaign.

At least one NBS activist, Sohan Singh Josh, was imprisoned for his role in the Meerut Conspiracy Case; he was released in November 1933. He was one of many people who were leaders simultaneously of the NBS and the Kirti Kisan Party, although the two organizations remained separate. NBS was active again by that time: earlier in the year, Karam Singh Mann, who had been converted to communism while training as a barrister in London, had organized a meeting to arrange dissemination of left-wing propaganda in rural areas. NBS was now one of the three significant left-wing groups in Punjab, the others being the outlawed Communist Party of India and the Kirti Kisan Party. These three attempted an alliance and sought also to gather together various smaller, disparate leftist groups of the region. With varying but never great success, various working parties were dispatched to co-ordinate local groups as well as document grievances, economic and political conditions in the regional districts. All associations considered to be left-wing were declared illegal under the Criminal Law Amendment Act (1908) in September 1934.

== See also ==
- Revolutionary movement for Indian independence
- Hindustan Socialist Republican Association
