= Shiv Verma =

Member of Hindustan Socialist Republic Army (1904-1997)

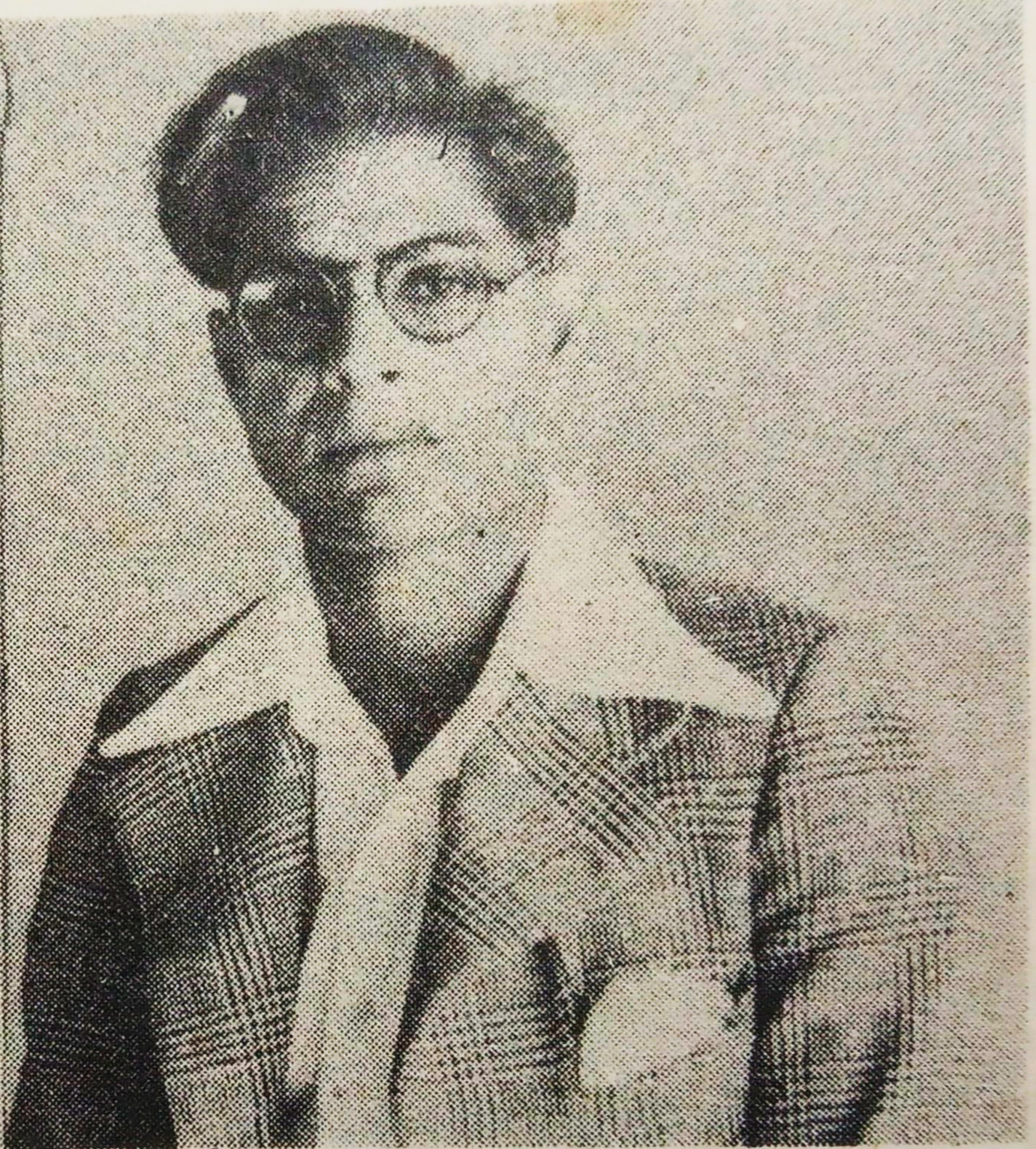
- Verma in 1928
- Born: 9 February 1904; Hardoi, United Provinces of Agra and Oudh, British India (present-day Uttar Pradesh, India)
- Died: 10 January 1997 (aged 92); Kanpur, Uttar Pradesh, India
- Other name: Prabhat
- Occupation: Revolutionary
- Organization(s): Communist Consolidation, Hindustan Socialist Republican Association
- Political party: Communist Party of India (Marxist)

Shiv Verma (Hindi: शिव वर्मा; 9 February 1904 — 10 January 1997) was an Indian Marxist revolutionary and a member of the Hindustan Socialist Republican Association.

== Early life ==
Shiv Verma was born on 9 February 1904 in Khateli village of Hardoi district in United Provinces. At the age of 17, he participated in the Non-Cooperation Movement.

He was a student of the DAV College of Cawnpore.

== Revolutionary activities ==
Cawnpore was the place where the Hindustan Republican Association was formed by Sachindra Nath Sanyal, Suresh Chandra Bhattacharya and others. People like Bejoy Kumar Sinha, Shiv Verma, Jaidev Kapoor, and Surendra Nath Pandey joined the party. Verma's party name was 'Prabhat' (Hindi: प्रभात).

Verma was inclined towards socialism. Sinha introduced Verma to the journalist and writer, Radha Mohan Gokul, who became an ideological mentor and inspiration for Verma. Radha Mohan had an extensive collection of books and he encouraged Verma to read and discuss socialism. In 1925, after the Kakori incident, Chandra Shekhar Azad was staying in Jhansi, in seclusion. He came to Cawnpore with Kundan Lal Gupta and stayed with Radha Mohan Gokul. This was when Verma and Azad met for the first time.

While studying at DAV College, Cawnpore, Verma met Bhagat Singh for the first time in January 1927, when the latter had come to Cawnpore for a week to meet all the other revolutionaries of HRA.

Ram Prasad Bismil was going to be hanged on 19 December 1927. A day before, his mother, Moolrani Devi (Hindi: मूलरानी) came to visit him for the last time at District Jail, Gorakhpur. Verma had already reached there. He approached Bismil's mother and requested her to help him meet Bismil to discuss some party matters. Bismil's mother instantly agreed and asked him to pose as Bismil's cousin, Shankar Prasad, and refer to her as 'mausi' (Hindi: मौसी). Since it was the final meeting between mother and son, they were left alone for some time. Bismil's mother then asked him to talk to Verma, referring to him as an HRA member.

It was Verma who recruited Mahabir Singh in June 1928 for HRA activities.

Verma regrouped with Sukhdev Thapar and others in Lahore. In November 1928, Verma underwent training in the manufacturing of bombs while staying in Agra near Noori Gate where he rented a house under the alias - Amir Chand.

In the initial verdict of the Kakori conspiracy case, Jogesh Chandra Chatterjee was sentenced to 10 years of imprisonment. While he was kept in the District Jail, Fatehgarh in 1927, Verma and Sinha were entrusted with the job of getting Chatterjee's approval for getting him released from prison. On 3 March 1928, after the duo left Fatehgarh, the police secretly were on their trail. The duo sensed this and decided to leave immediately. They bought train tickets for Cawnpore, but the ticket details were soon available to the police. When the train started, two policemen seated themselves in the same compartment where the duo had reserved their seats. They were looking for an opportunity to abscond during the journey. Later, when the train was leaving the Jalalabad station, they jumped out of the train cautiously. The constables hurt themselves in their attempt to follow them and could not give chase. The duo again evaded arrest at the Cawnpore Station but now had accepted the fact that, henceforth, they would have to lead the life of fugitives.

Verma was a member of the Central Committee which was formed by the revolutionaries in the ruins of the Feroze Shah Kotla fort of Delhi on September 8 & 9, 1928. He was the organizer of the United Provinces branch. Verma wrote several articles for the paper 'Chand' (Hindi: चाँद).

By the beginning of 1929, it was clear that Viceroy Lord Irwin would use his veto power to pass the Public Safety Bill and the Trade Dispute Bills, despite being rejected in the assembly. Verma was assigned as the leader of a team that would assess the possibility of assassinating Lord Irwin. They decided to attempt it when the Viceroy was going to attend a banquet and dinner party held by some I.C.S officers in New Delhi. Shivaram Rajguru was the spotter, Jaidev Kapoor was supposed to hurl a bomb on Irwin's car and Verma was the backup - in case Kapoor missed. Rajguru noticed that the Viceroy's car was containing three ladies, hence, he didn't give any signal and was later praised by Azad and the other compatriots for avoiding indiscriminate assassinations. They later learned that the Viceroy had proceeded to some other venue and reached the banquet venue later via a different route.

Azad had ordered that after Bhagat Singh and Batukeshwar Dutt hurled bombs in the assembly, everyone except Verma and Kapoor must leave Delhi while Azad himself will head to Jhansi. Verma went to drop Azad at the station. Azad instructed Verma to take good care of Singh and Dutt as these two were headed on a path of no return. Verma and Kapoor spent a sleepless and dejected night in their Delhi hideout, wondering about the future of their arrested compatriots.

=== Arrest ===
Gaya Prasad, Jaidev Kapoor, and Verma were given the task of setting up a bomb factory in Saharanpur. The modus operandi was simple - Prasad would rent a place to start a dispensary, and Verma and Kapoor would be his compounder and dresser, respectively. This plan had worked out successfully previously e.g.: Ferozepur factory-cum-hideout (where Verma pretended to be 'Ram Narayan Kapoor'). This time, they couldn't secure any funds as their primary source, Kashiram (another HSRA revolutionary) failed to turn up with the money. Prasad then left for Cawnpore to arrange some funds while Verma and Kapoor stayed back. Soon, the locals and the police grew suspicious as these two were idle, the doctor was missing and there was no activity resembling a dispensary. This was in May 1929. Every night, Verma and Kapoor went to the terrace and observed the surrounding area. One of their observations was that the police conducted search raids and arrests around 0400 hours, therefore, they took turns and stood guard during the night. After sunrise, they would come down and sleep without any anxiety. On 13 May 1929, they were fast asleep in the courtyard when there was a knock on the door. Verma woke up and opened the door thinking that it was Prasad but it turned out to be armed police constables. The DSP, Mathura Dutt Joshi, and the Chief Police Officer marched in while the constables held Verma. Upon being asked about his whereabouts, Verma said that he was Prasad's relative, he was studying at the Banaras University and was here on a vacation. He denied any knowledge about the gunpowder lying in one of the cupboards. In the adjoining room, they found Kapoor along with bombshells and other material. The DSP compelled Verma to open a trunk. Verma opened the trunk, put his hand inside it, produced a bomb, and pretended to hurl it toward the DSP. The DSP and most of the constables ran outside the house while the Chief Police Officer hid behind the door and started to observe Verma's moves. To prevent accidents, the bombs and the pins required to trigger them were kept separately. Verma wanted the pins and two revolvers placed in another cupboard, hence, he placed the bomb on the floor and proceeded toward the cupboard. The Chief Officer seized this opportunity, overpowered Verma, and called for support. The constables stormed in again and finally, both Kapoor and Verma were handcuffed. Two days later, Prasad was arrested at the same location when he returned from Cawnpore, late in the night.

Both were taken to the Police Headquarters, imprisoned but treated well to create an impression that the arrested revolutionaries were treated generously. One of the constables confided in Verma that the DSP had told them they were going to raid and arrest opium traders, had the constables had any idea about the revolutionaries, they would have allowed them to escape. Verma and Kapoor also learned that the tip-off was given by their HSRA compatriot, Phanindranath Ghosh, who had turned into a witness for the Police.

=== Hunger strike ===
Verma, Jaidev Kapoor, and Gaya Prasad were sent to Central Jail Lahore. Over a short period of time, the HSRA revolutionaries arrested at different locations were together in the prison. Verma, Kapoor, Kishori Lal and all the other HSRA revolutionaries began a hunger strike on 13 July 1929, to express solidarity with Bhagat Singh and B. K. Dutt, who had already been on a hunger strike for a month. Being lean and thin, Verma received less beating and thrashing from the Police while Singh, Mahabir Singh, Shivaram Rajguru, Sukhdev Thapar and other sturdier men bore most of the brunt. In the hunger strike, Jatin Das succumbed to the ill effects of forced feeding while Verma's condition turned critical.

=== Lahore Conspiracy verdict ===
The Lahore Conspiracy Case ruling came on 7 October 1930. Verma was among the revolutionaries who were sentenced to life imprisonment. One day, a senior Police Inspector ordered Verma and his associates to vacate their cells. He compassionately allowed Verma and others to meet Bhagat Singh, Sukhdev Thapar, and Shivaram Rajguru for one last time. Verma's eyes brimmed with tears when leaving. This is when Singh remarked, "Shiv, it is not the time to be emotional. I will be relieved of all difficulties in a few days; but you all have to undertake a long, difficult journey. I am confident that despite the heavy burden of responsibility, you will not be fatigued in this long campaign and you will not be disheartened enough to give up".

=== Imprisonment ===
Verma was then sent to District Jail Rajahmundry of Andhra Pradesh where he learned about the deaths of first, Chandrasekhar Azad and later, Bhagat Singh, Sukhdev Thapar, and Shivaram Rajguru. He was later deported to the Kala Pani at Andaman Islands. In 1933, he participated in the hunger strike to protest against the inhuman and unfair treatment meted out to the inmates, especially, the political prisoners. During this hunger strike, his HSRA compatriot, Mahabir Singh, died. The others who died were Mohit Maitra and Manakrishna Nabadas. The British authorities finally relented and agreed to the following demands:-

- Soap provided to clean the body
- Beds to sleep in
- Edible food

For political prisoners:-

- Allow studying and provide books
- Allow communicating amongst themselves

Gradually, an academic environment grew within the premises of the prison. Prisoners studied political science and history under Satish Pakrashi, Verma, and Bhupal Bose. In 1937, under the leadership of Verma and Hare Krishna Konar the 36-day and final hunger striker was done before Kala Pani was shut down permanently in January 1938. He was repatriated to India in September 1937 but was finally released in 1946.

== Later life ==
In 1948, Verma was elected secretary of the Uttar Pradesh state committee of the Communist Party of India. He was imprisoned several times during the years 1948, 1962, and 1965 when the ruling Indian National Congress took action against the communist parties. Verma sided with the CPI(M). Verma got the MP ticket of CPI(M) from Kanpur in 1971, he was defeated by his rival, independent communist candidate S.M. Banerjee supported by the CPI.

He incessantly tried to factually portray the Indian revolutionaries and counter the polarized opinions about them. He became the editor of ‘लोकलहर’ (Loklahar) and ‘Naya Savera’, the mouthpiece of the then Communist Party of India. He was also the editor of a Hindi journal Naya Path. He was a lifelong trustee of the Lucknow Montessori Society started by Durga bhabhi. He also founded the Martyrs Memorial and Freedom Struggle Research Centre, Lucknow. He traveled all over the country to collect articles, photographs, etc., of the revolutionaries. He even went to the British Museum, London, in this very connection.

== Death ==
Verma died on January 10, 1997, at Kanpur, Uttar Pradesh due to age-related illness.

== Legacy ==
The municipal council of Hardoi has passed a resolution to erect statues of Shiv Verma, Jaidev Kapoor, and Hari Bahadur Shrivastav in the garden (Hindi: शहीद उद्यान) dedicated to Indian revolutionaries.

In the movie The Legend of Bhagat Singh, Kapil Sharma portrayed the role of Shiv Verma.

== Bibliography ==
- संस्मृतियाँ (Memoirs)
- मौत के इंतज़ार में (Awaiting Death)
- Edited the book titled ‘Selected writings of Bhagat Singh’

He also wrote and translated many books and articles of Bhagat Singh
