= Bejoy Kumar Sinha =

Indian revolutionary (1909–1992)

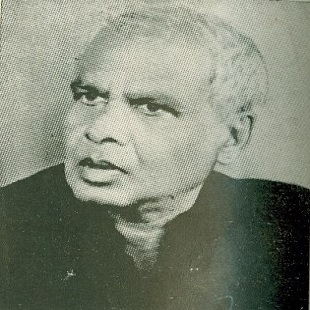
- Born: 17 January 1909; Cawnpore, United Provinces, British India
- Died: 16 July 1992 (aged 83); Patna, Bihar, India
- Other names: Bacchu, Bijoy
- Political party: Communist Party of India
- Spouse: Shrirajyam Sinha
- Parents: Markand (father); Sarat Kumari (mother)

Bejoy Kumar Sinha (Bengali: বিজয় কুমার সিংহ) (17 January 1909 ― 16 July 1992) was an Indian revolutionary and member of Hindustan Socialist Republican Association.

== Early life ==
Sinha was born on 17 January 1909 in Mohalla Karachi Khana, Cawnpore to Sarat Kumari Sinha and Markand Sinha, in a Bengali family. He studied at the Christ Church College.

== Revolutionary activities ==
Like several revolutionaries, Sinha was a youth disappointed with the abrupt termination of the Non-cooperation Movement.

Vijay Kumar and his elder brother, Raj Kumar, were recruited by Suresh Chandra Bhattacharyya. Ajoy Ghosh and Batukeshwar Dutt were his former classmates. Sinha's party name was ‘Bacchu (Hindi:बच्चू)’. Bhagat Singh met this group in Kanpur in the year 1924, after he absconded from home to avoid getting married. Sinha once asked Bhagat Singh that why the latter is unwilling to marry, Bhagat Singh responded "I don't want to increase the number of widow in this country". While in service of the newspaper 'Pratap' (Hindi: प्रताप), Bhagat Singh distributed pamphlets written by him and other members of HSRA. A four-page pamphlet, dated 1 January 1925 issued under signature of Bejoy Kumar, President Central Council, but in all probability the production of Sachindra Nath Sanyal, was widely distributed in Bengal, U.P and Bihar.

In 1927, the party had decided that Sinha should head to Moscow to garner support from the Soviet Union. Sinha belonged to the first batch of the HSRA revolutionaries trained in making bombs, this began in Calcutta with the help of Jatin Das.

In the initial verdict of the Kakori conspiracy case, Jogesh Chandra Chatterjee was sentenced to 10 years imprisonment, along with Raj Kumar Sinha and others. Sinha's sister lost her mental balance because of the police oppression. While Chatterjee was kept in the Fatehgarh jail in 1927, Shiv Verma and Vijay Kumar Sinha were entrusted the job of getting Chatterjee's approval for getting him released from the jail. On 3 March 1928, after the duo left Fatehgarh jail, the secret police were on their trail. The duo sensed this and decided to leave immediately, they bought train tickets for Kanpur but the ticket details were soon available to the police. When the train started, two policemen seated themselves in the same compartment where the duo had reserved their seats. The duo was looking for an opportunity to abscond during the journey. Later, when the train was leaving the Jalalabad station, the duo jumped out of the train cautiously but the constables hurt themselves and couldn't chase. The duo again evaded arrest at the Kanpur station but now had accepted the fact that, henceforth, they will have to lead a life of fugitives.

The compatriots often used to tease each other. One theme of teasing was how a particular revolutionary would get captured. Sinha was a movie buff and his compatriots always teased him that if he would ever get caught by the police, it would be in a cinema hall. Even if the police would arrive, he would say "I will come with you but after the movie is finished".

There was a shortage of funds to conduct the meeting at Ferozeshah, hence, Sinha sold Phanindranath's return train ticket to arrange some money. Sinha was a member of the Central Committee which was formed by the revolutionaries in the ruins of the Feroze Shah Kotla fort of Delhi on 8 & 9 September 1928. The introductory speech was given by Sinha:

“A turning point has arisen in the revolutionary movement after the Kakori incident. Today we can clearly see where we stand. We know which kind of path we have so far trod, the present situation, and in which direction we have to proceed. To decide our path we have to learn something from the Kakori incident and we have to critically examine the manner in which the Congress is conducting the freedom movement. We have to understand from the Kakori incident that our party is no longer a single state party and that it should acquire the form of an All-India one. Moreover, we should decentralize its authority. By distribution of power, I do not mean giving the entire authority to any one person. We should create a committee which takes its own decisions and guides us on important matters. Now for a close examination of the Congress activities--regarding this matter, I would just like to say that the Congress does not have a clear picture of how the freedom of our country should be won and it is misleading the people with the word 'Swarajya'. The public understands the meaning of 'Swarajya', as one's own rule in the country. Despite this, Congress is desperate to accept the abbreviated form of 'Swarajya'. I wonder why the Congress while strengthening its movement with public support, does not tell them the correct meaning of independence. Today the situation in the financial sector is this that the farmers are being exploited by the landlords and the money-lenders. On the other hand, the labourers, becoming victims of exploitation by mill-owners, are going on strikes and the Congress is not able to use the dissatisfaction of the farmers and labourers for the freedom struggle. Therefore, the responsibility of achieving independence has fallen on us. My request is that the members present their opinion on whatever I have said. We shall then come to a healthy conclusion.”.

Bhagat Singh and Sinha were given the responsibility of establishing harmony among the revolutionaries of different states.

Vijay Kumar Sinha & Bhagwan Das Mahaur were the third line, of both attack and defense, during the assassination attempt of Saunders.

=== Arrest ===
After the arrest of Bhagat Singh and B.K. Dutt on 8 April 1929, in Delhi, and of other revolutionaries like Sukhdev on 15 April, the Punjab police discovered the link of revolutionaries led by Bhagat Singh in the assassination of Saunders. Soon, other arrests followed. An FIR was filed against 25 people in the court of Rai Sahib Pt. Sri Kishan, Special Magistrate appointed to conduct the Lahore conspiracy case. While the police produced 16 of the accused in the court on 10 July 1929, accused from 17th to 25th in the list were declared absconders. These included Chandrashekhar Azad (never arrested and martyred on 27 February 1931 in Alfred Park, Allahabad), Bejoy/Vijay Kumar Sinha (arrested later in Bareilly), Rajguru (arrested later), Bhagwaticharan Vohra (never arrested and martyred on 28 May 1930 while experimenting with a bomb at Ravi bank, Lahore), Kundan Lal (arrested last), Yashpal (noted Hindi writer (arrested in 1932 and charged with different cases), Satguru Dayal (not arrested).

=== Hunger strike ===
Sinha, along with the other arrested revolutionaries like Jaidev Kapoor, Shiv Verma etc., joined the hunger strike in Lahore jail to express solidarity with Bhagat Singh and Batukeshwar Dutt. When Jatin Das was counting the last moments of his life, he asked his associates to sing something. Sinha sang the famous song ‘Ekla Chalo Re’, of the renowned poet Rabindranath Tagore.

=== Lahore Conspiracy verdict ===
The Lahore Conspiracy Case ruling came on 7 October 1930. Sinha was among the revolutionaries who were sentenced to life imprisonment.

Sinha was of the opinion that Bhagat Singh's hanging should be delayed, as long as possible, because it would trigger more protests and agitations against the government. Later, a fortnight before his execution, Bhagat Singh met Sinha. Bhagat Singh expressed to Sinha his desire to be hanged:

"It would be a calamity if I am spared. If I die, wreathed in smiles, India's mothers would wish their children to emulate Bhagat Singh and thus, the number of formidable freedom fighters would increase so much that it would be impossible for the satanic powers to stop the march of the revolution.".

=== Imprisonment ===
After a stay in Rajahmundry Jail of Andhra Pradesh, Sinha was deported to the cellular jail in Andaman, along with his HSRA compatriots like Shiv Verma, Jaidev Kapoor in June 1933. Earlier, in January 1933, Dr. Gaya Prasad, Mahavir Singh, Batukeshwar Dutt, Kamal Nath Tiwari had already reached Andaman. Soon, they all went on a hunger strike as a protest against the inhumane treatment meted to the prisoners, especially, the political. During this hunger strike, Mahavir Singh died. The others who lost their lives were Mohit Maitra, Manakrishna Nabadas. The British authorities finally relented and agreed on the following demands:

- Soaps to clean body
- Beds to sleep
- Edible food

For political prisoners

- Allow studying, provide books
- Allow communicating among themselves

Gradually, an academic environment grew within the premises of the jail. The revolutionaries like Sinha, Verma used to conduct classes for inmates and the subjects were related to materialism, political science, world history, state of the colonies, Indian society etc. He was expatriated in 1937 and released in 1938 but again detained from 1941 till 1945, thus, he was imprisoned for more than 17 years.

== Later life ==
After Independence, Sinha joined the Communist Party of India along with his HSRA compatriots like Shiv Verma, Kishori Lal, Ajoy Ghosh, Jaidev Kapoor. He contested but got defeated in elections in Kanpur elections in 1962.

== Death ==
Sinha passed away in Patna on 16 July 1992. Known family members:

1. Wife: Srirajyam Sinha
2. Daughter-in-law: Shanta Sinha

== In popular culture ==
In the movie The Legend of Bhagat Singh, Siddarth Hussain portrayed Sinha.

== Bibliography ==
- In Andamans, the Indian bastille
- Indian revolutionary movement
- The new man in the Soviet Union; a human narrative of Soviet way of life(New Delhi, People's Pub. House, 1971)
- Indian renaissance: a Marxist approach(New Delhi: Communist Party of India, 1986)
- Why the national revolutionaries became communists?(New Delhi: Communist Party of India, 1985)
