= Cellular Jail =

British colonial prison in modern day India

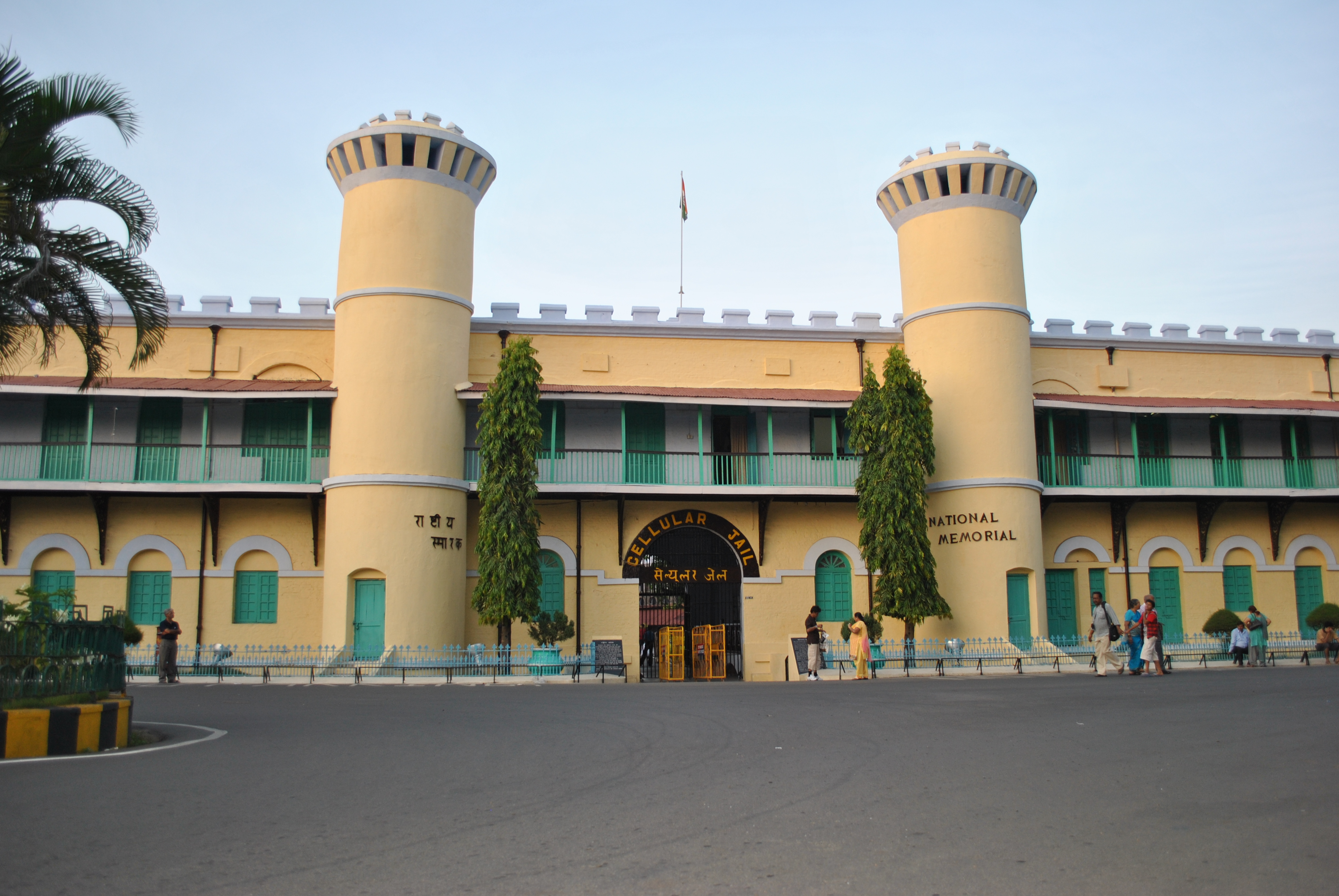
- Entrance of the Cellular Jail
- Alternative names: Kālā Pāni

General information
- Type: Prison for political prisoners (Indian independence activists)
- Architectural style: Cellular, pronged
- Location: Port Blair, Andaman, India
- Coordinates: 11.675°N 92.748°E
- Construction started: 1896
- Completed: 1906
- Cost: ₹517,352
- Client: India
- Owner: National Memorial

Cellular Jail
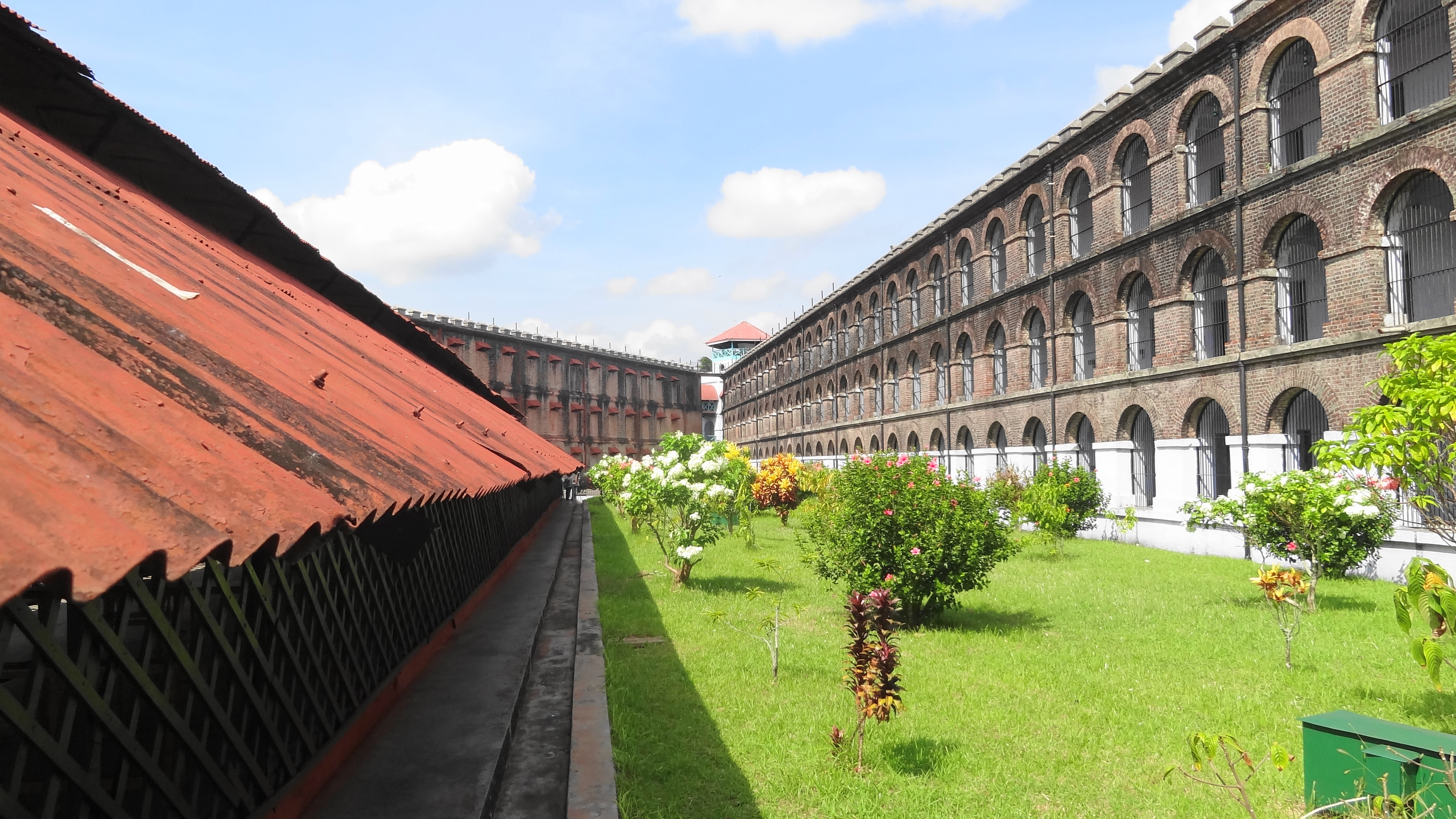
- Interactive map of Cellular Jail

Notable prisoners
- Fazl-e-Haq Khairabadi; Batukeshwar Dutt; Bhai Parmanand; Diwan Singh; Hare Krishna Konar; Hemchandra Kanungo; Mahavir Singh; Maulvi Allauddin; Mohan Kishore Namadas; Mohit Moitra; Sachindra Nath Sanyal; Shiv Verma; Sohan Singh Bhakna; Sudhangshu Dasgupta; Vinayak Damodar Savarkar; Yogendra Shukla

The Cellular Jail, also known as 'Kālā Pānī' (transl. 'Black Water'), is a former British colonial prison in the Andaman and Nicobar Islands. The prison was used by the colonial government of India for the purpose of exiling insurgents and political prisoners. Many notable independence activists were imprisoned there during the struggle for India's independence. Today, the complex serves as a national memorial monument.

Originally built with seven wings, the building suffered extensive damage during the earthquake of 1941. Later, two wings were dismantled during the Second World War by the Japanese, who repurposed the bricks for constructing bunkers and other structures. After India gained independence, two more wings were demolished in the 1950s to make way for the nearby Govind Ballabh Pant Hospital. Today, only the watchtower and three wings (1, 6, and 7) remain.

== History ==
Although the prison complex itself was constructed between 1896 and 1906, the British authorities in India had been using the Andaman Islands as a prison since the days in the immediate aftermath of the Indian Rebellion of 1857.

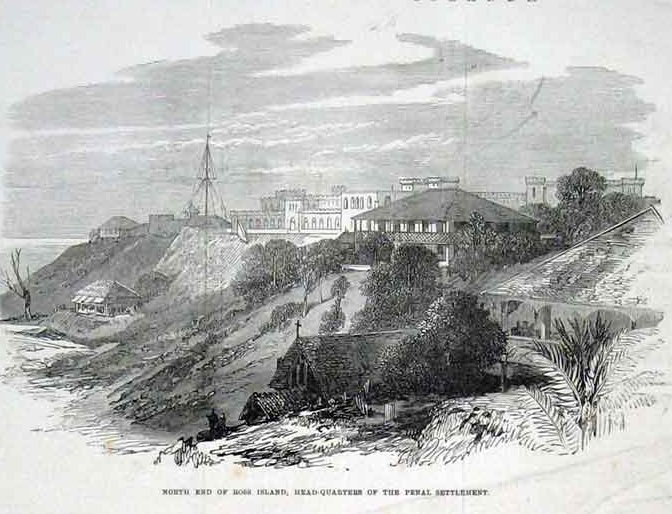
The Ross Island Prison Headquarters, 1872

Shortly after the rebellion was suppressed, captured prisoners were put on trial, with many of them being executed. Others were exiled for life to the Andamans to prevent them from re-offending. Two hundred rebels were transported to the islands under the custody of the jailer David Barry and Major James Pattison Walker, an Indian Medical Service (IMS) doctor who had been warden of the prison at Agra. Another 733 from Karachi arrived in April 1868. In 1863, the Rev. Henry Fisher Corbyn, of the Bengal Ecclesiastical Establishment, was also sent out there and he set up the 'Andamanese Home' there, which was also a repressive institution albeit disguised as a charitable one. Rev. Corbyn was posted in 1866 as Vicar to St. Luke's Church, Abbottabad, and later died there and is buried at the Old Christian Cemetery, Abbottabad. More prisoners arrived from India and Burma as the settlement grew. Anyone who belonged to the Mughal royal family, or who had sent a petition to Bahadur Shah Zafar during the Rebellion was liable to be deported to the islands.

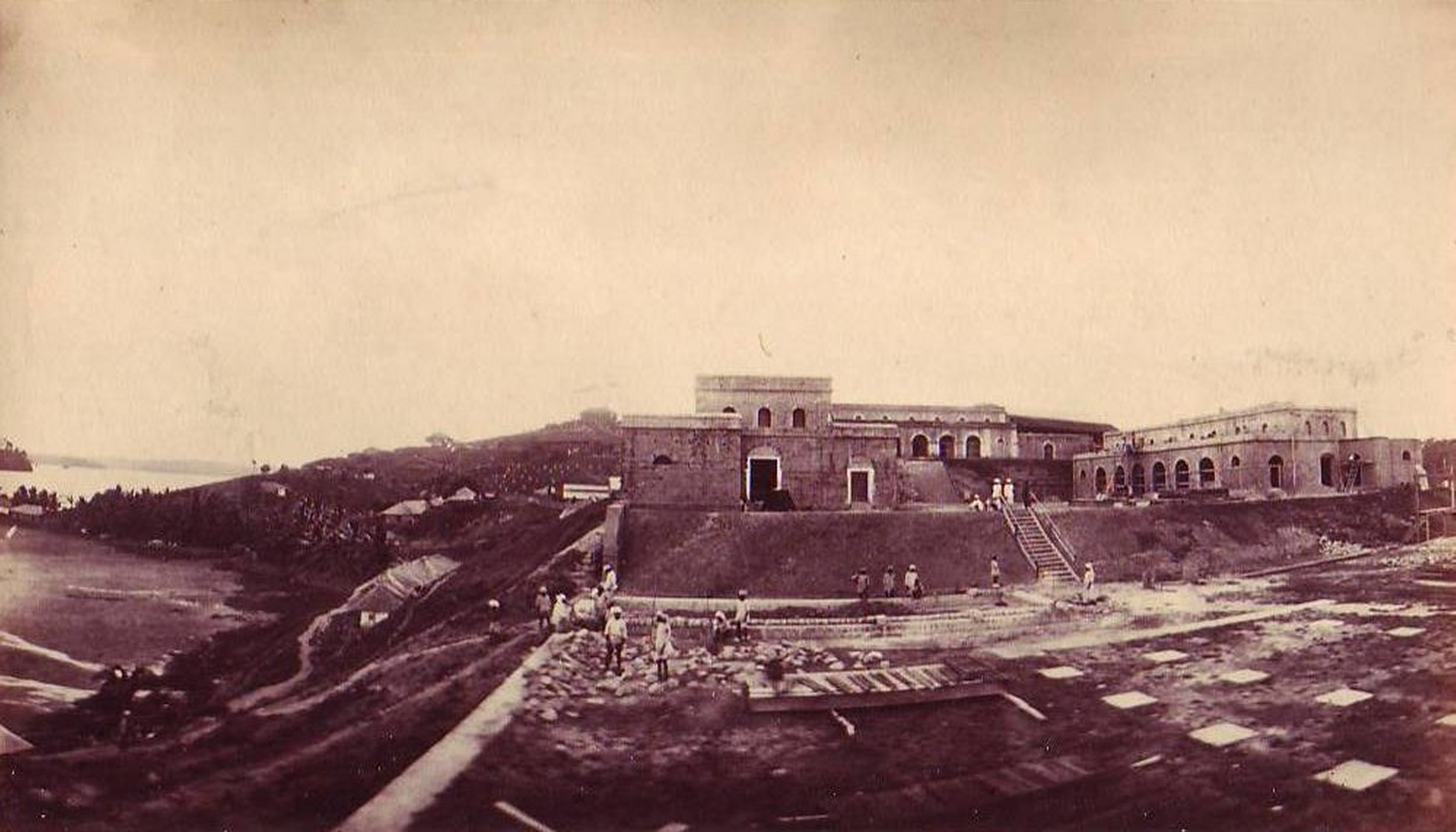
Port Blair - Viper New Jails under construction

The remote islands were considered to be a suitable place to punish the independence activists. Not only were they isolated from the mainland, the overseas journey (kala pani) to the islands also threatened them with loss of caste, resulting in social exclusion. The convicts were also used in chain gangs to construct prisons, buildings, and harbour facilities.

By the late 19th century, the independence movement had picked up momentum. As a result, the number of prisoners being sent to the Andamans grew and the need for a high-security prison was felt. From August 1889 Charles James Lyall served as home secretary in the Raj government, and was also tasked with an investigation of the penal settlement at Port Blair. Both he and A. S. Lethbridge, a surgeon in the IMS, concluded that the punishment of transportation to the Andaman Islands was failing to achieve the purpose intended and that indeed criminals preferred to go there rather than be incarcerated in Indian jails. Lyall and Lethbridge recommended that a "penal stage" should exist in the transportation sentence, whereby transported prisoners were subjected to a period of harsh treatment upon arrival. The outcome was the construction of the Cellular Jail, which has been described as "a place of exclusion and isolation within a more broadly constituted remote penal space."

== Architecture ==
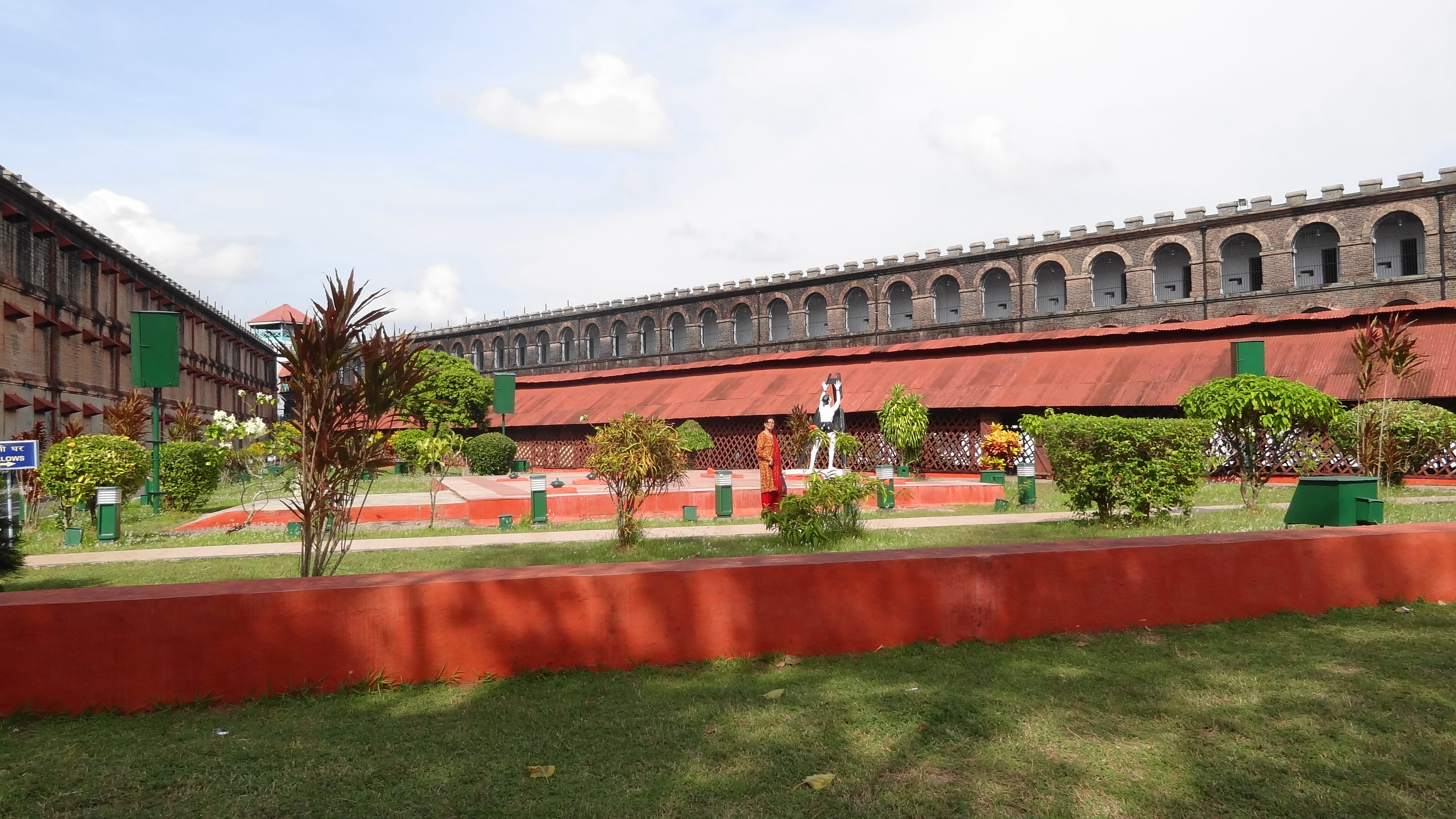
Cellular Jail

The construction of the prison started in 1896 and was completed in 1906. The original building was a puce-colored brick building. The bricks used to build the building were brought from Burma.

The building had seven wings, at the center of which a tower served as the intersection and was used by guards to keep watch on the inmates; this format was based on Jeremy Bentham's idea of the panopticon. The wings radiated from the tower in straight lines, much like the spokes of a wheel.

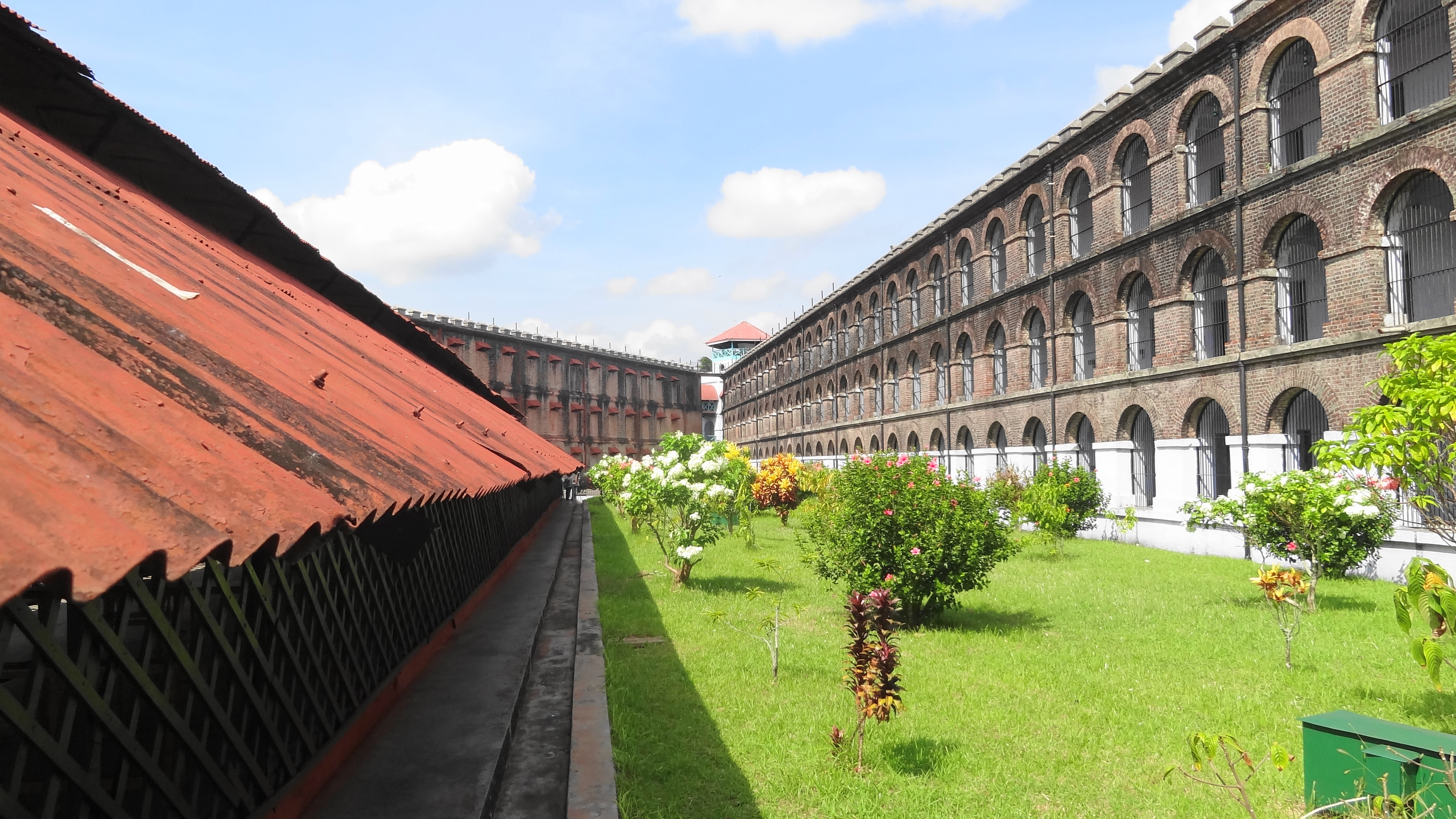
One of the seven wings

Each of the seven wings had three stories upon completion. There were no dormitories and a total of 696 cells. Each cell was 4.5 by 2.7 metres (14.8 ft × 8.9 ft) in size with a ventilator located at a height of 3 metres (9.8 ft). The name, "cellular jail", derived from the solitary cells, which prevented any prisoner from communicating with any other. Also, the spokes were designed such that the face of a cell in a spoke saw the back of cells in another spoke. This way, communication between prisoners was impossible. They were all in solitary confinement. The locks of the prison cells were designed in such a way that the inmate would never be able to reach the latch of the lock. The prison guards would lock up the inmates and throw the key of the lock inside the jail. The inmate would try to put his hand out and try to unlock the door but would never be able to do so as his hand would never reach the key.

== Notable incarcerations ==
- Sardar Singh Artillery
- Diwan Singh Kalepani
- Yogendra Shukla
- Batukeshwar Dutt
- Vishwanath Mathur
- Hemchandra Kanungo
- Sachindra Nath Sanyal
- Shadan Chandra Chatterjee
- Sohan Singh Bhakna
- Hare Krishna Konar
- Shiv Verma
- Allama Fazl-e-Haq Khairabadi
- Sudhanshu Dasgupta
- Ullaskar Dutta
- Barindra Kumar Ghosh
- Ganesh Damodar Savarkar
- Vinayak Damodar Savarkar

== Prison conditions and inmates ==
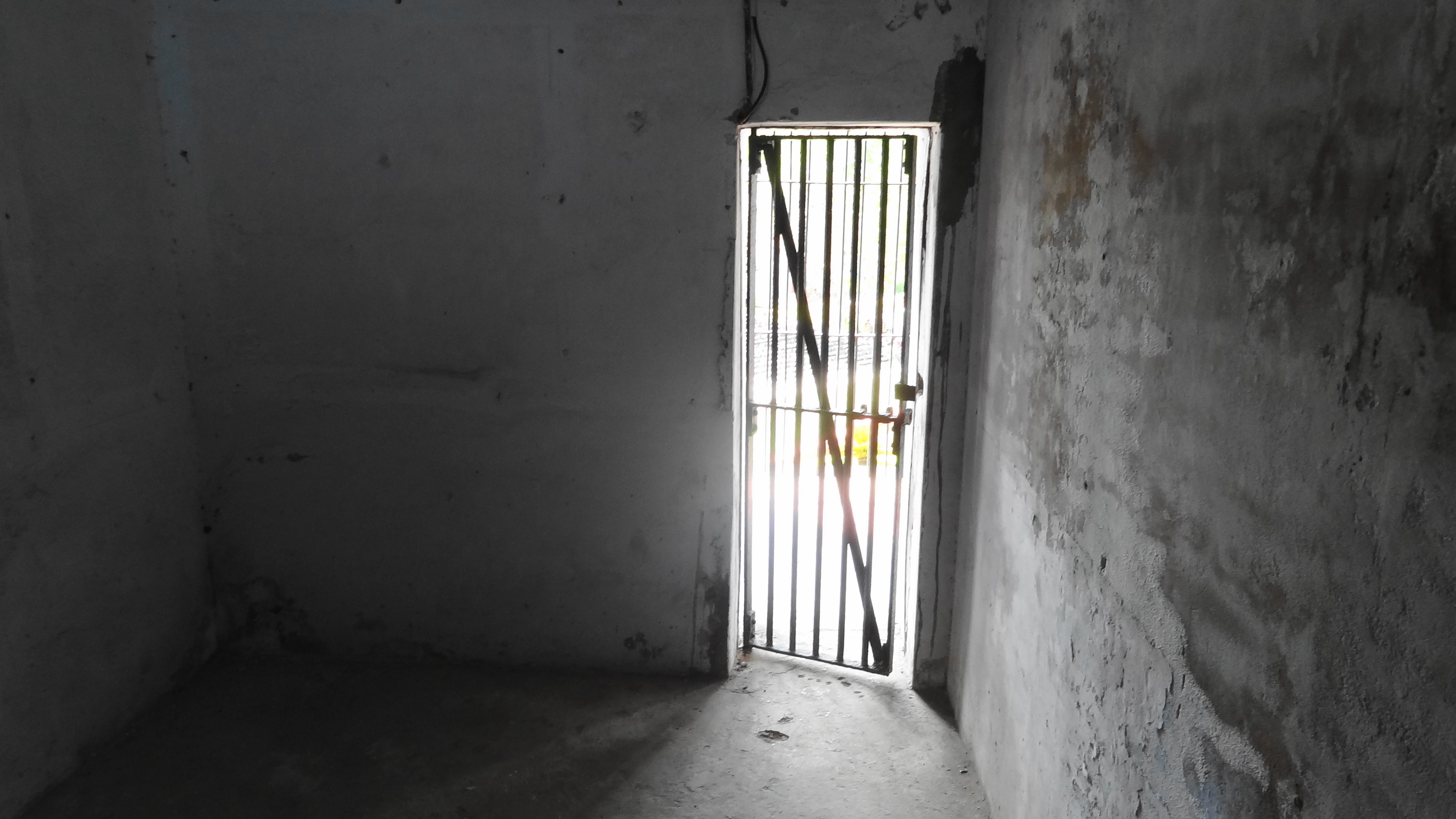
From inside a cell

According to an article in the Guardian newspaper, prisoners would face "torture, medical tests, forced labour and for many, death." In response to poor conditions in the Cellular Jail, including the quality of prison food, numerous prisoners went on hunger strikes. Those who did were often force-fed by the prison authorities in order to save their lives.

Solitary confinement was implemented as the British government of India wanted to ensure that political prisoners and revolutionaries be isolated from one another. Most prisoners of the Cellular Jail were independence activists. Some inmates were, Fazl-e-Haq Khairabadi, Yogendra Shukla, Batukeshwar Dutt, Babarao Savarkar, Vinayak Damodar Savarkar, Sachindra Nath Sanyal, Hare Krishna Konar, Bhai Parmanand, Sohan Singh, Subodh Roy, and Trailokyanath Chakravarty. Many moplahs arrested in the 1921 Malabar rebellion were also lodged in Cellular Jail. Several revolutionaries were tried in the Alipore Case (1908), such as Barindra Kumar Ghose, the surviving companion of Bagha Jatin, was transferred to Berhampore Jail in Bengal, before his mysterious death in 1924.

Sher Ali Afridi, a former officer in the Punjab Mounted Police, was a life convict in the jail who had been imprisoned for murder. He was sentenced to death on 2 April 1867 and during appeal this was reduced to life imprisonment and he was deported to Andamans to serve his sentence. The 6th Earl of Mayo, Viceroy of India from 1869, was visiting the Andaman and Nicobar Islands in February 1872 when he was murdered by Afridi. Sher Ali Afridi wanted to kill the Superintendent and the Viceroy as a revenge for his sentence, which he thought was more severe than he deserved. He said that he killed on the instructions of Allah. He was subsequently hanged.

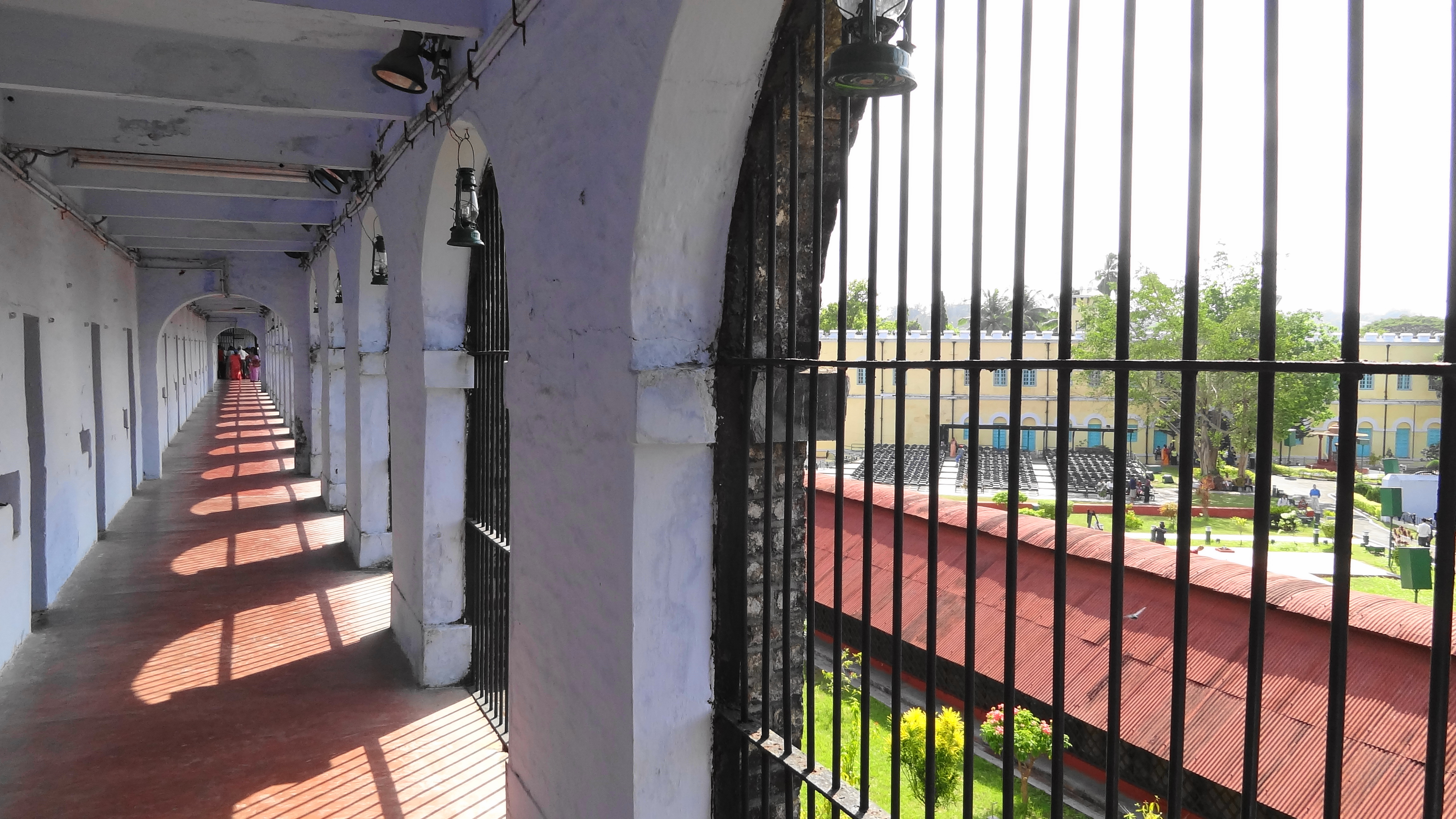
Cellular Jail balcony

In March 1868, 238 prisoners tried to escape. By April they were all caught. One committed suicide and of the remainder Superintendent Walker ordered 87 to be hanged.

Among the records of the Government of India's Home Department, we found the Empire's response in its Orders to Provincial Governors and Chief Commissioners. "Very Secret: Regarding security prisoners who hunger strike, every effort should be made to prevent the incidents from being reported, no concessions to be given to the prisoners who must be kept alive. Manual methods of restraint are best, then mechanical when the patient resists."

Hunger strikes by the inmates in May 1933 caught the attention of the jail authorities. Thirty-three prisoners protested their treatment and sat in a hunger strike. Among them were Mahavir Singh, an associate of Bhagat Singh (Lahore conspiracy case), Mohan Kishore Namadas (convicted in Arms Act Case) and Mohit Moitra (also convicted in Arms Act Case). These three died due to force-feeding. Other prisoners:

- Prisoner 61, Narain (having excited sedition in the cantonment at Dinapore) was the first to try to escape. He was fished from the black water, hauled up before Dr Walker and executed.
- Prisoner 68 Mahavir Singh: "It took a while for the whisper to reach the Yard Five Wing. By then it was 8 pm." The bell rang again. Every prisoner shuffled to his locked gate. "The feeding tube had gone into Mahavir Singh's lungs. They were filled with milk. Doctors were now fighting to revive him. So we shouted 'Inquilab Zindabad' – long live the revolution. 'Inquilab Zindabad'. Twenty-one warders ran out of the Central Tower. 'Inquilab Zindabad'. Truncheons were drawn, a gun was cocked." "Midnight", Dr. Edge noted in the penal colony's hospital log. "Mahavir Singh – dead."
- Prisoner 89, Mohan Kishore, had also been killed. Drowned in milk
- Prisoner 93 Mohit Mitra, killed. Drowned in milk
- Prisoner 147 Dhirendra Chowdhury (robbery to raise funds for bombs and guns), one of the few survivors of Kalapani
- Prisoner 10817, Choitun, and
- Prisoner 12819, Mehtab, came the closest to succeeding. According to The Guardian, "They stole away from the islands on 26 March 1872, rowing out into the Bay of Bengal on home-made rafts across a 750-mile stretch of turbulent water, dodging schools of bounty hunters who fought over 250-rupee rewards (then £25). Picked up by a British vessel, they persuaded the crew that they were shipwrecked fishermen and eventually pitched up, free, at the Strangers Home for Asiatics in London. The two were fed, clothed and given a bed. But while they slept, Colonel Hughes, the home's proprietor, took photographs that were circulated around the Empire. One morning, Mehtab and Choitun awoke to find themselves shackled and frog-marched aboard a ship bound for India."
- Prisoner 15557 Sher Ali, killed Lord Mayo, the Viceroy of India, who arrived at the Andaman Islands on an inspection tour on 8 February 1872; hanged on 11 March 1872* Prisoner 31549 Barin Ghose
- Prisoner 31552 Ullaskar Dutt (made home-made bombs that exploded inside a carriage in Muzaffarpur, killing the bridge partners of Douglas Kingsford, the chief presidency magistrate, Mrs. Pringle Kennedy and her daughter, Grace). He was tortured, declared insane due to malarial infection, transferred to the island's lunatic ward at Haddo, and held there for 14 years.
- Prisoner 31555, Indu Bhushan Roy (hanged himself with a strand of torn kurta, "exhausted by the unrelenting oil mill")
- Prisoner 38360, Chattar Singh, who was suspended in an iron suit for three years
- Prisoner 38511, Baba Bhan Singh, who had been beaten to death by David Barry's men
- Prisoner 41054, Ram Raksha, who had starved himself in protest at the removal of sacred Brahminical threads from around his chest
- Haripada Chowdhury (caught in the attempted murder case of the editor of The Englishman (later Statesman) Watson and was sentenced for 10 years and deported to Andaman. Was eventually released in the year 1939. During his capture he was found in possession of a pistol along with numerous bullets of different caliber, which are now on display, along with his photograph, in the Kolkata Police Museum, situated in the premises of North Kolkata DC Office.)
- Naringun Singh (guilty of desertion at Nuddea) (hanged himself in his cell, due to torture by the prison authorities)

Mahatma Gandhi and Rabindranath Tagore launched a campaign to shut down the jail, and the colonial government decided to repatriate the political prisoners from the Cellular Jail from 1937 to 1938. "The Cellular Jail was forced to empty in 1939. Two years later, the Japanese seized the islands, transforming the penal settlement into a prisoner of war camp, incarcerating the British warders. In 1945 the Andamans would become the first piece of India to be declared independent."

State-wise list of freedom fighters sent to the Cellular Jail:

S. No.	State	Number of Freedom Fighters
1	Bengal	608
2	Punjab	95
3	Maharashtra	3
4	Bihar	17
5	Uttar Pradesh	18
6	Kerala	14
7	Andhra Pradesh	8
8	Odisha	5
9	Himachal/ NW Frontier/ Tamil Nadu/ State not known	27
	Total	795

== INA control ==
The Japanese launched an invasion of the Andaman islands in March 1942, capturing the Cellular Jail and all prison personnel. The Cellular Jail then became home to British prisoners-of-war, suspected Indian supporters of the British, and later of members of the Indian Independence League, many of whom were tortured and killed there by the Japanese. Notionally during this period control of the Islands was passed to Subhas Chandra Bose, who hoisted the Indian National Flag for the first time on the islands, at the Gymkhana Ground in Port Blair, appointed INA General AD Loganathan as the governor of the Islands, and announced the Azad Hind Government was not merely a Government in Exile, and had freed the territory from British colonial rule.

On 7 October 1945 the British resumed control of the Islands, and prison, following the surrender of the islands to Brigadier J. A. Salomons, of the 116th Indian Infantry Brigade, a month after the Surrender of Japan, at the end of World War II.

== Post Independence ==
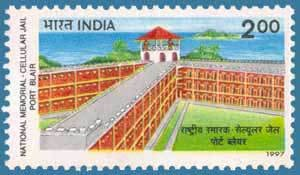
Stamp of India - 1997 Cellular Jail

Another two wings of the jail were demolished after India achieved independence. However, this led to protests from several former prisoners and political leaders who saw it as a way of erasing the tangible evidence of their history.

The Govind Ballabh Pant Hospital was set up in the premises of the Cellular Jail in 1963. It is now a 500-bed hospital with about 40 doctors serving the local population.

Cellular Jail was declared a National Memorial by the then Prime Minister of India, Morarji Desai on 11 February 1979.

The centenary of the jail's completion was marked on 10 March 2006. Many former prisoners were celebrated on this occasion by the Government of India.

Apart from guided tours, a sound-and-light show is also run in the evenings narrating and showcasing the trials and tribulations of the inmates. It is available in English and Hindi.

== In popular culture ==
Kaalapani, a 1996 Malayalam historical drama film was based on the prison and its inmates during 1915. Some scenes were shot in the actual prison.

Arthur Conan Doyle's second Sherlock Holmes novel, The Sign of the Four, centers around a group of characters who were inmates or guards at the colonial jail in the Andaman islands. One of the characters is an escapee who has returned to England with a native Andamanese man as a companion. The novel characterizes the Andamanese people in a racist manner, by contemporary standards.

Kalapani finds its mention in Amitav Ghosh's novel Sea of Poppies, as the route via which girmitiyas are taken to Mauritius.

== Gallery ==
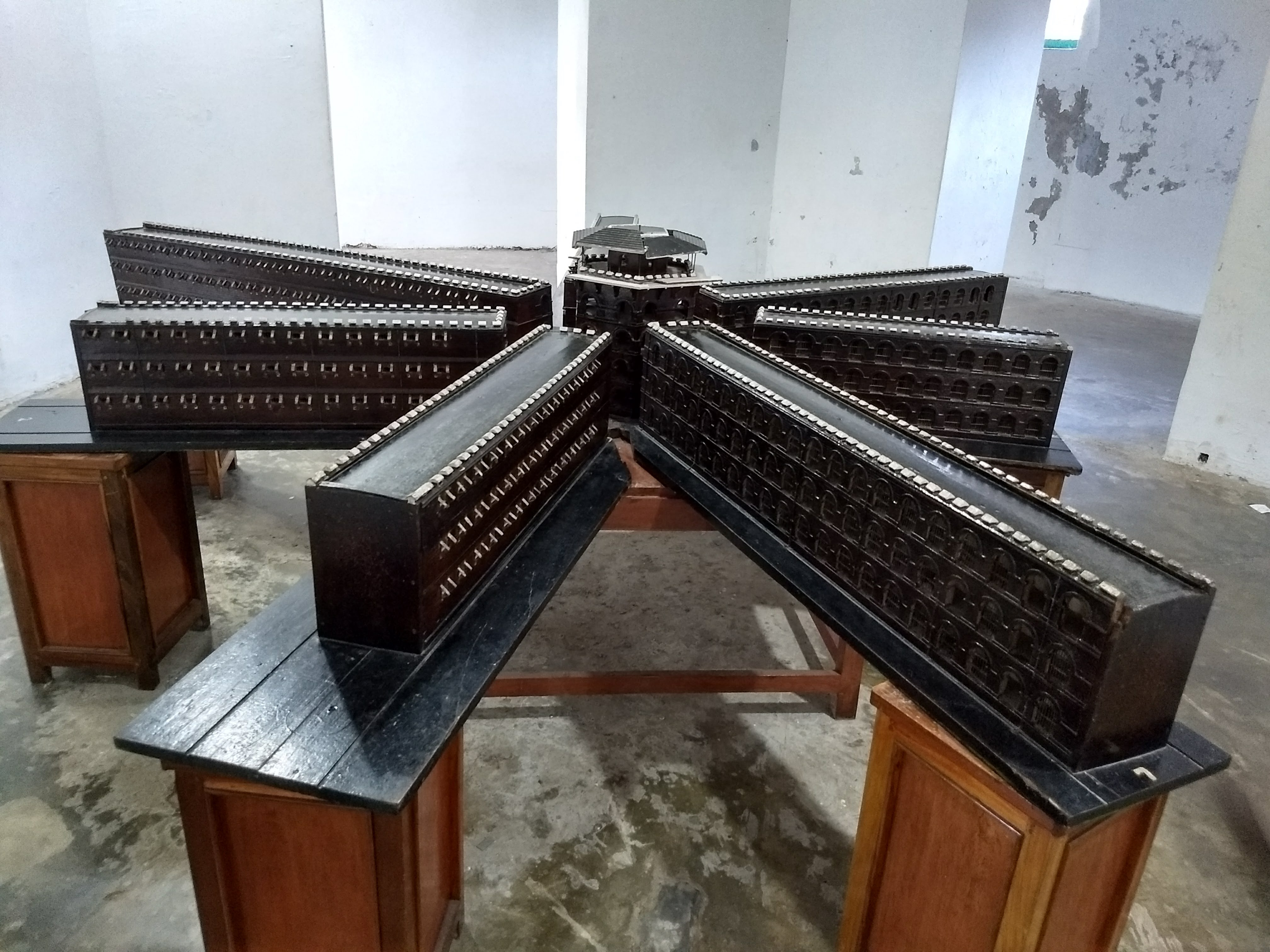
Exhibit at Cellular Jail: model of the facility

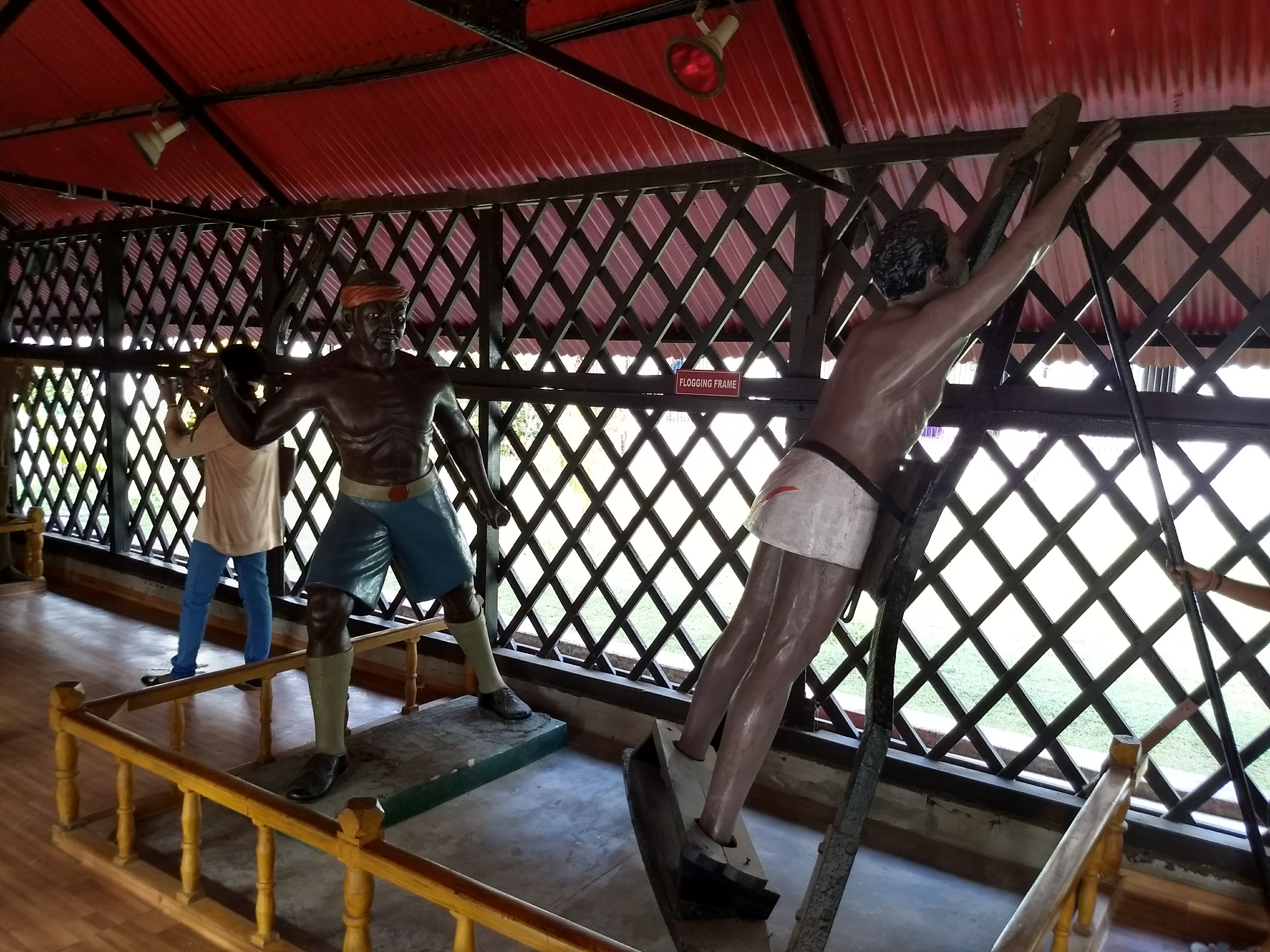
Exhibit at Cellular Jail: flogging frame

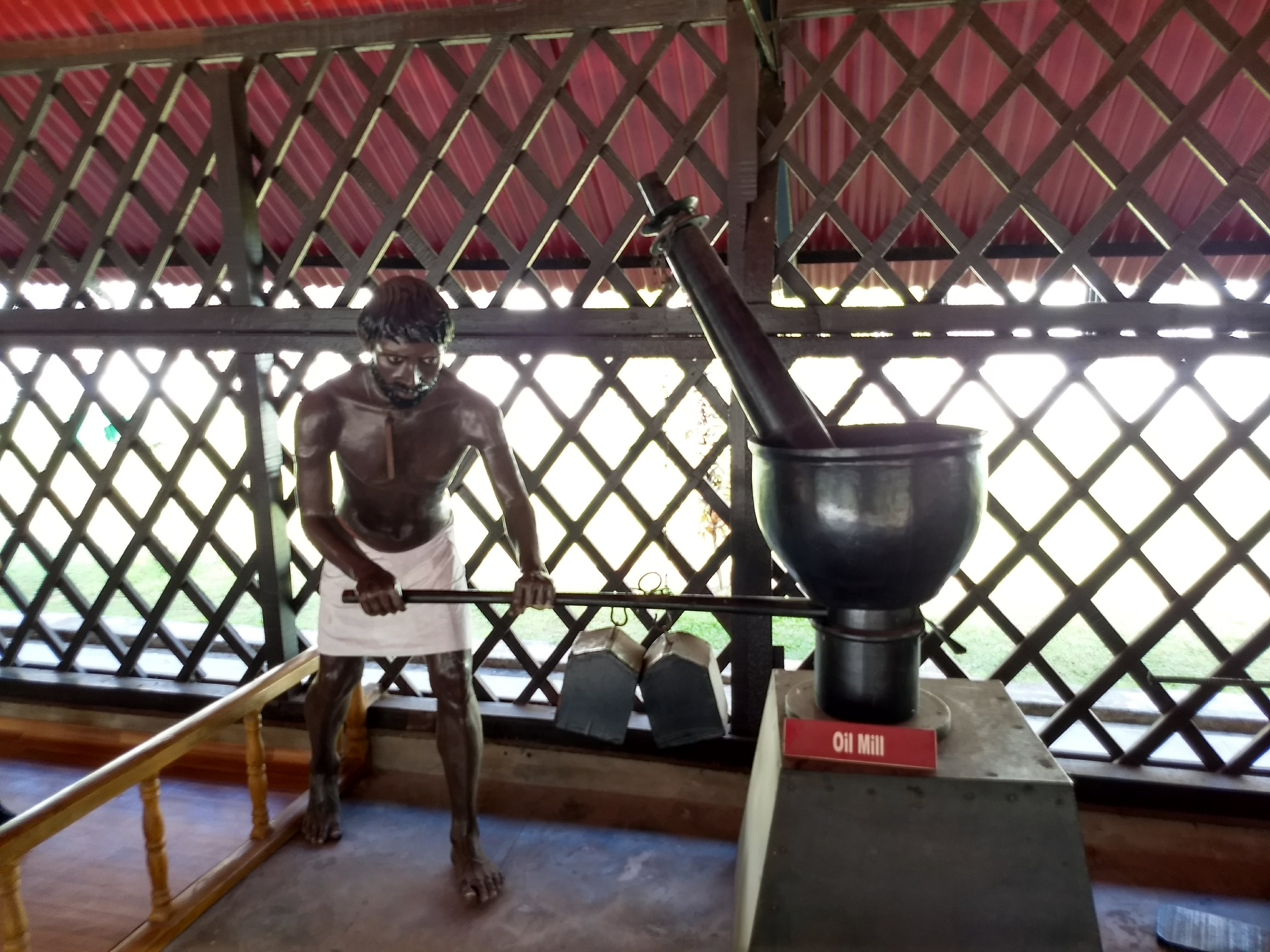
Exhibit at Cellular Jail: oil mill

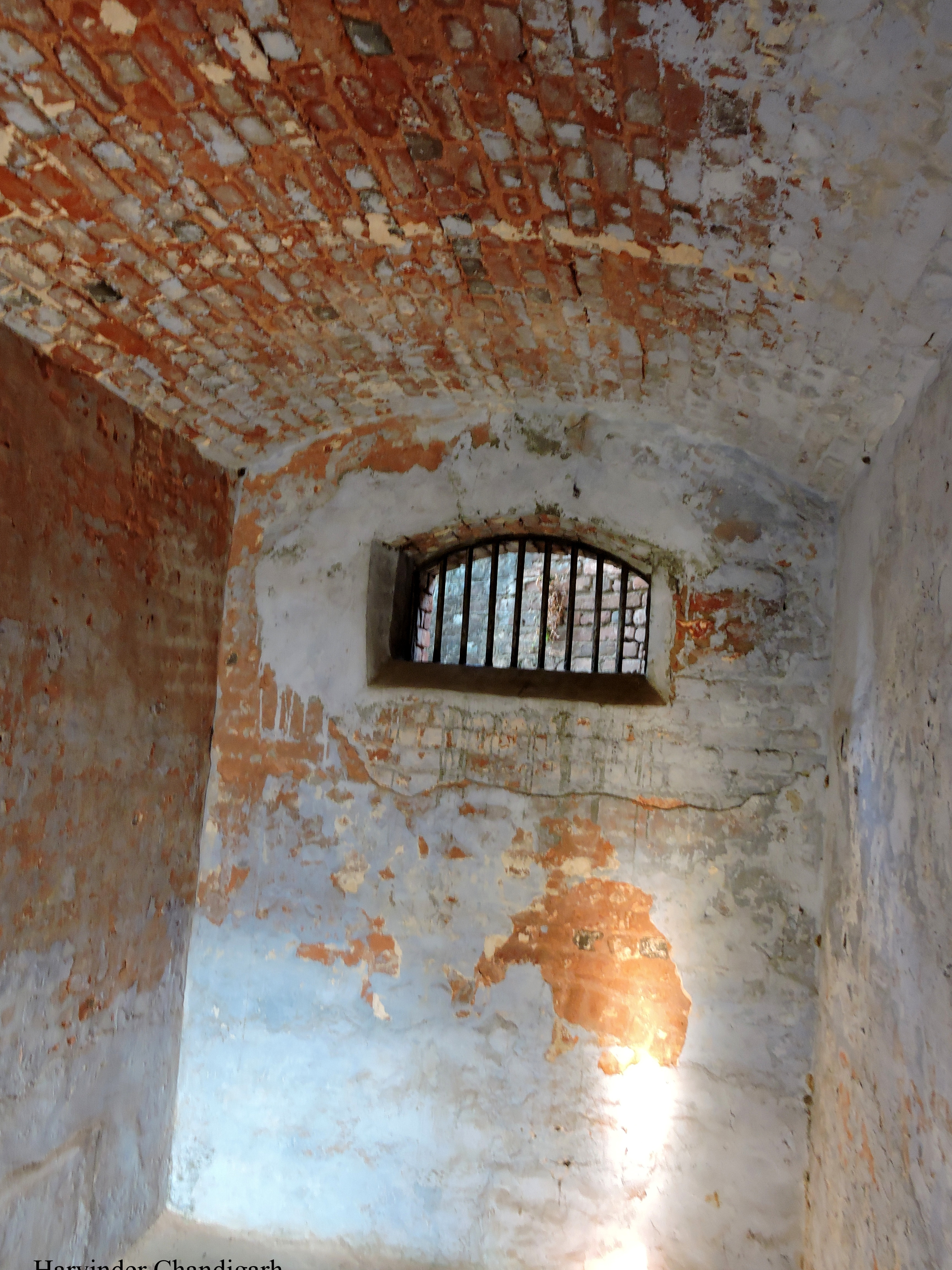
Inner view of a cell

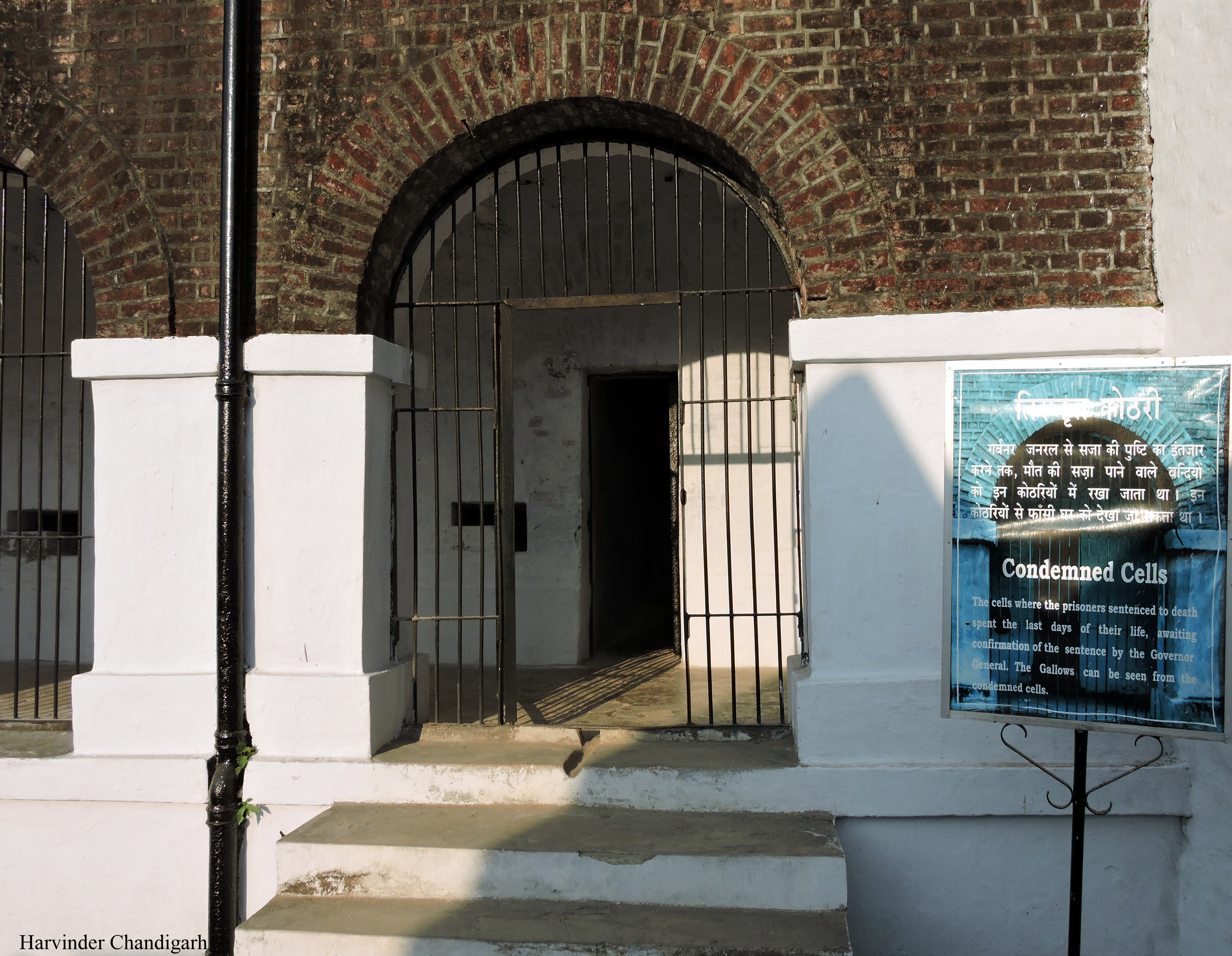
Special condemned cell for keeping prisoners before hanging

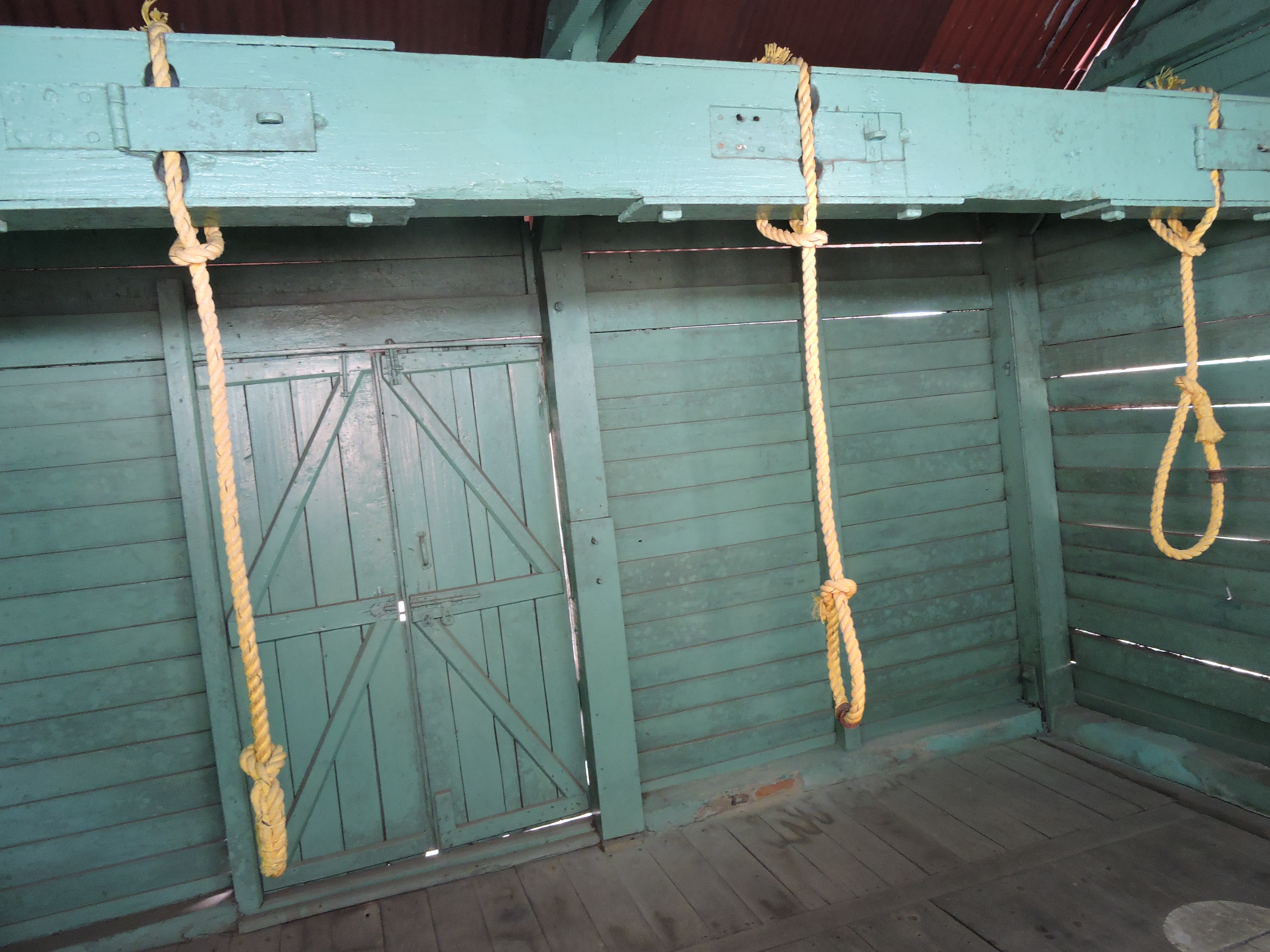
The hanging cell, where three prisoners could be hanged at once

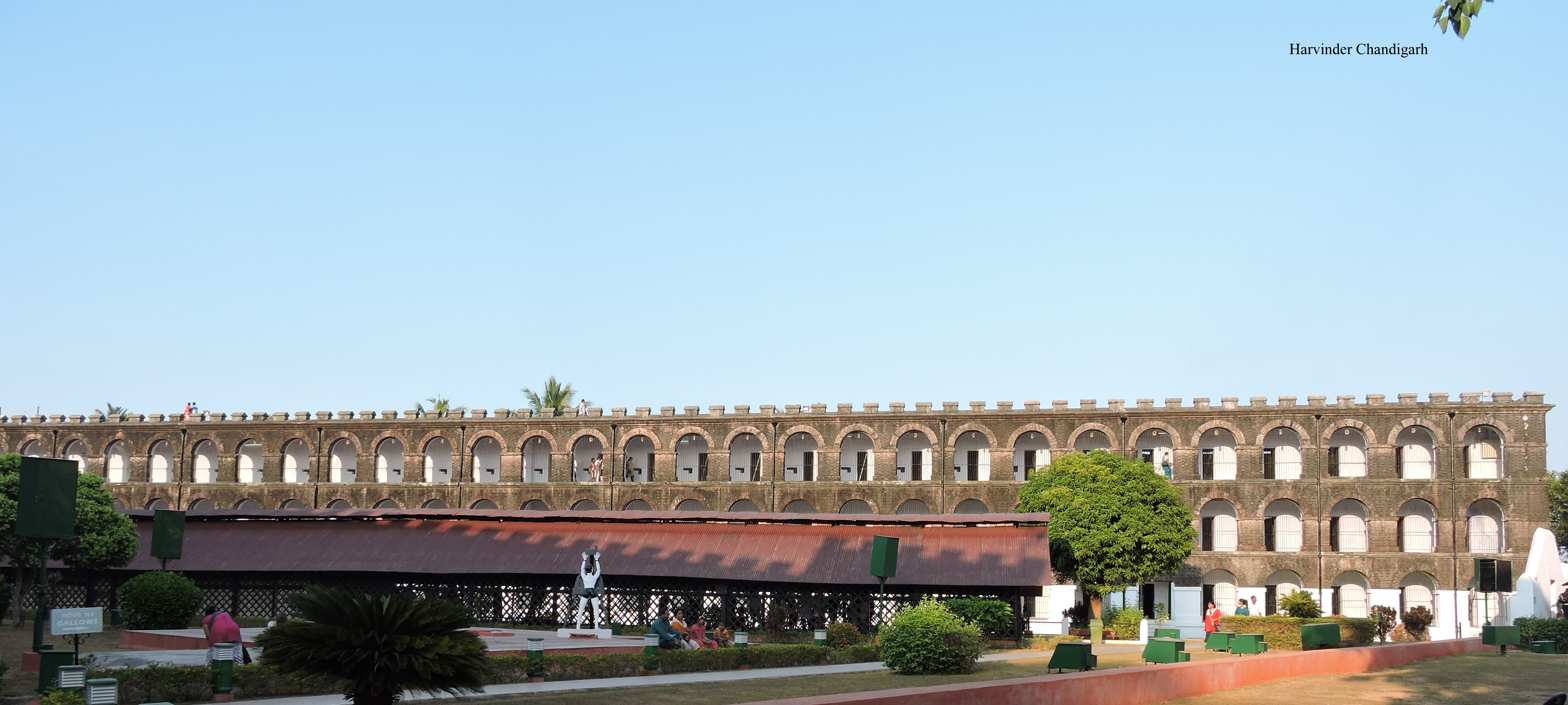
Exterior view of one wing

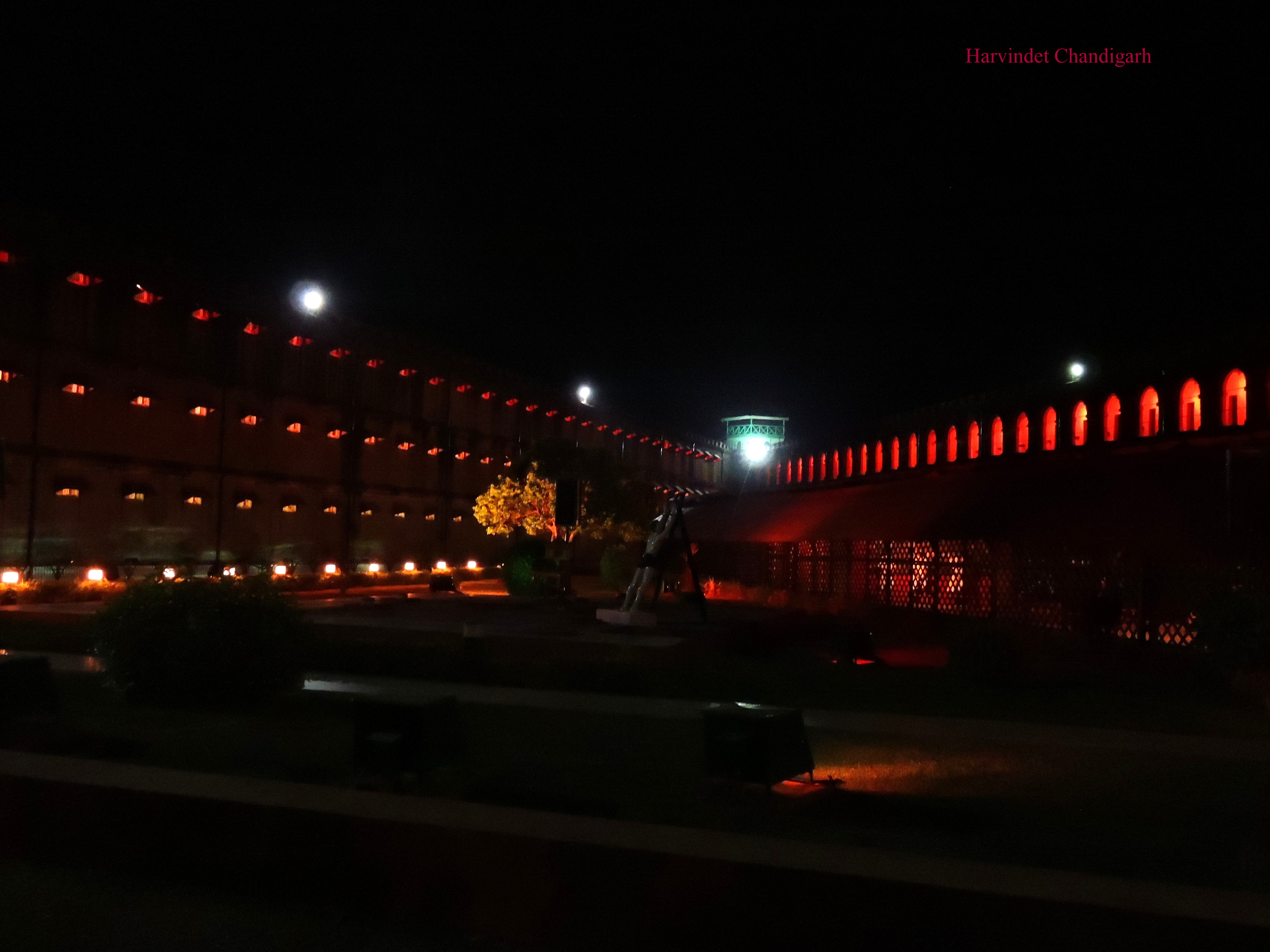
Night time view

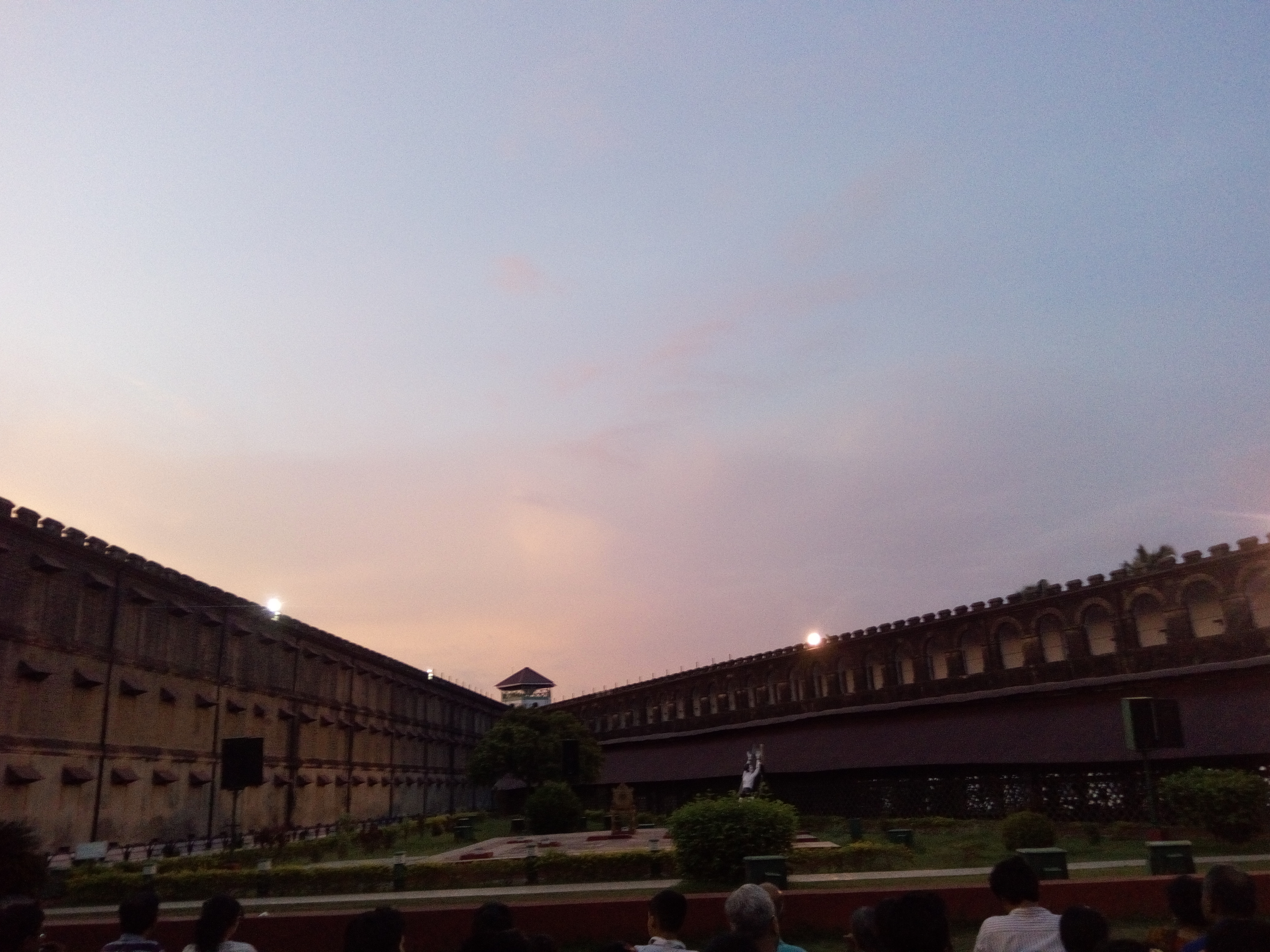
Cellular Jail in the evening

== See also ==
- Charles Tegart, British police commissioner
- Communist Consolidation
- Kaalapani, a 1996 Indian film set in the jail
