= Mohan Kishore Namadas =

Indian freedom fighter

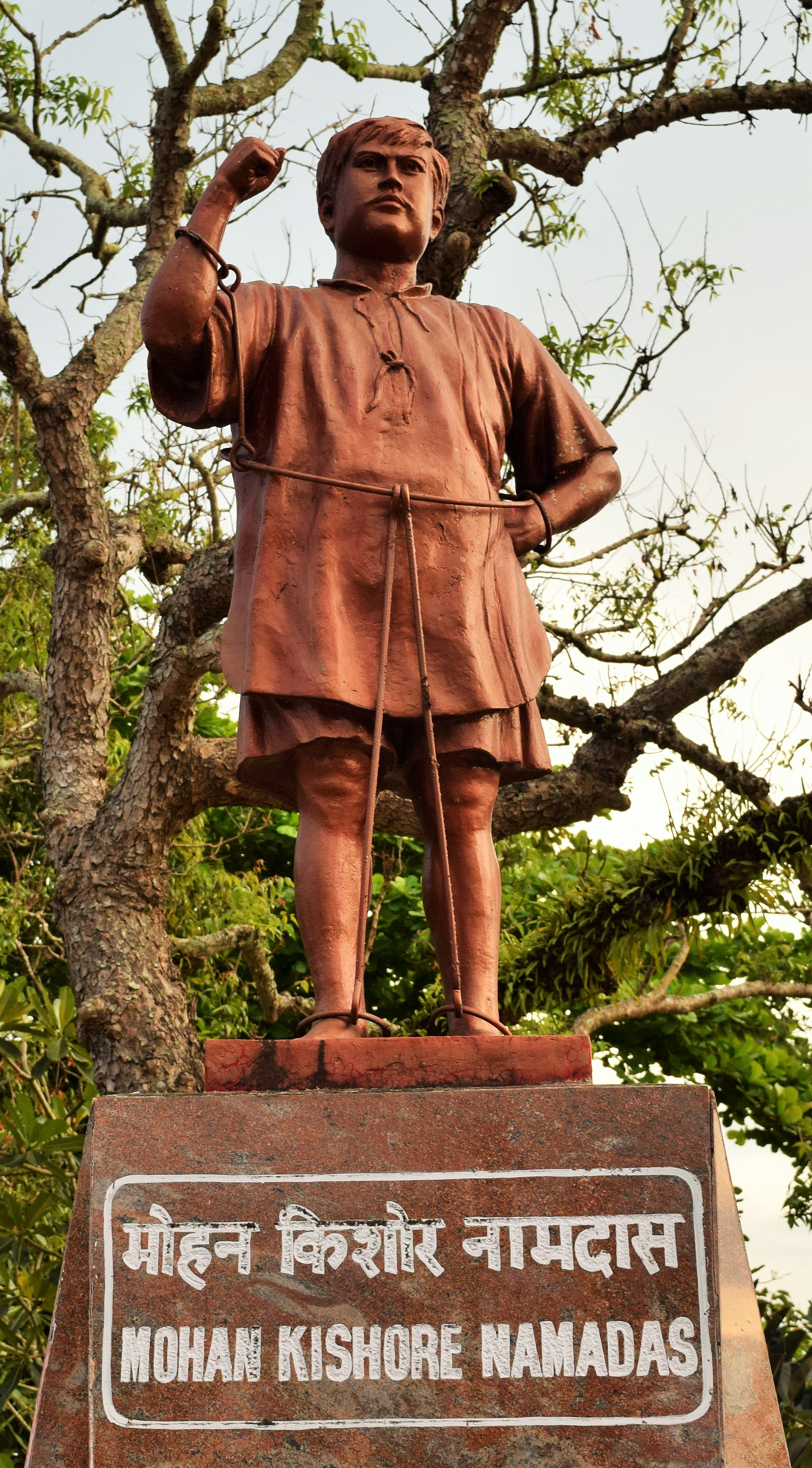
- Born: Bajitpur, Mymensingh District, Bengal Presidency, British India
- Died: 26 May 1933; Cellular Jail, Port Blair, Andaman Islands, British India
- Cause of death: Force-feeding
- Organization: Anushilan Samiti
- Known for: Indian independence movement

Mohan Kishore Namadas was an Indian revolutionary and independence fighter in the 1930s.

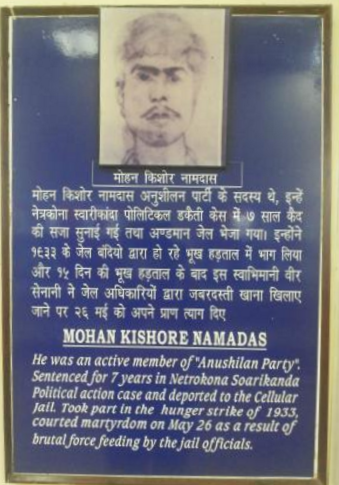
Portairt of Mohan Kishore Namadas

== Revolutionary activities ==
He was an active member of Anushilan Samiti of Kolkata. He was sentenced to seven years imprisonment due to the membership of Netrokona Soarikanda political action case and deported to Cellular Jail in Andaman Islands. He took part in the hunger strike of 1933 to protest against the inhuman treatment meted out to the prisoners along with Mohit Moitra (convicted in the Arms Act Case), Mahavir Singh (convicted in Second Lahore Conspiracy Case) and 30 others. He died on 26 May 1933 due to the brutal force feeding process. Mohit Moitra and Mahavir Singh also died during the Hunger Strike.
