= Mahavir Singh (revolutionary) =

Indian revolutionary and independence fighter (1904–1933)

Mahavir Singh Rathore
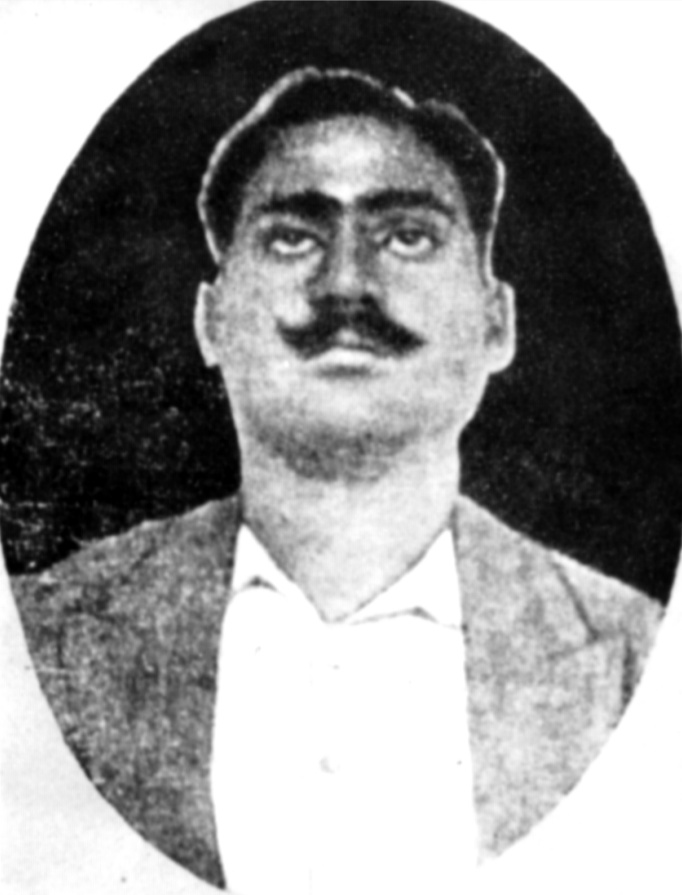
- Singh in 1931
- Born: 16 September 1904; Shahpur Tahla, Etah, United Provinces, British India
- Died: 17 May 1933 (aged 28); Port Blair, Andaman Islands, British India
- Cause of death: Force-feeding
- Organization: Naujawan Bharat Sabha
- Known for: Indian independence movement

Mahavir Singh Rathore (16 September 1904 — 17 May 1933) was an Indian revolutionary and independence fighter in the 1930s. Singh was a member of Naujawan Bharat Sabha. He helped in the escape of Bhagat Singh, Batukeshwar Dutt and Durgawati Devi from Mozang House in Lahore. He was arrested as part of the Second Lahore Conspiracy Case and took part in the hunger strike of 1933 to protest the treatment of prisoners along with Mohit Moitra (convicted in Arms Act Case), Mohan Kishore Namadas (also convicted in Arms Act Case). and 30 others. Singh died on 17 May 1933 due to force feeding. Mohit Moitra and Mohan Kishore Namadas also died during the hunger strike. A statue was erected in front of the Cellular Jail in his honor.

== Early life ==
Mahavir Singh was born in Rajput (Thakur) family on Shahpur Tahla in Kasganj District (then tehsil of district Etah) of Uttar Pradesh on 16 September 1904. His father was Debi Singh. He became involved in revolutionary activity while studying in DAV College, Kanpur.

== Revolutionary activities ==
Mahavir Singh was a member of Naujawan Bharat Sabha. He helped in the escape of Bhagat Singh, Batukeshwar Dutt and Durgawati Devi from Mauzang House in Lahore.

He was arrested as part of the Second Lahore Conspiracy Case and took part in the Hunger Strike of 1933 to protest the treatment of prisoners along with Mohit Moitra (convicted in Arms Act Case) and Mohan Kishore Namadas (convicted in Arms Act Case) and 30 others.

During the Lahore Conspiracy Trial, upon Bhagat Singh calling Justice Coldstream as "My Lord", Mahavir Singh bravely remarked ' "My Lord" kahana band karo. "My Lord" gadhe hain (Stop saying 'My Lord' for 'My Lord' is a donkey/idiot).

== Death ==
Mahavir Singh died on 17 May 1933 due to force feeding. Mohit Moitra and Mohan Kishore Namadas also died during the Hunger Strike.

== Popular culture ==
- In 2023 63rd Episode of Swaraj included a full episode on Mahavir Singh. The title role of Mahavir Singh was played by actor Shagun Pandey and aired on DD National.
