= Diwan Singh =

Punjabi poet and activist (1897–1944)

Diwan Singh Kalepani (Diwan Singh Dhillon) (b.22 May 1897 d. 14 January 1944) was a Punjabi poet, freedom fighter and President of the Indian Independence League's regional wing in Port Blair. He participated in the Indian freedom movement and the Non-cooperation movement in the 1920s. He wrote poetry in free verse and composed two volumes: Vagde Pani (‘Running Waters’) in 1938, and Antim Lehran (‘Winding Waves’) which were published posthumously in 1962. His poetry often criticized the British Raj and of organized religion.

== Early life ==
Diwan Singh was born on 22 May 1897 in Little Galotian, Sialkot District, British Raj (now Pakistan), to Sunder Singh and Inder Kaur. His mother died when he was two, and his father died due to plague. He was raised by his father's younger brother, Sohan Singh, and grandmother. He studied at Scotch Mission School at Daska, learning literature and science.

== Career ==
His poems include "Wagde Pani" and "Antim Lehran". He later established a school. He died on January 14, 1944.

== Legacy ==
The Shaheed Dr. Diwan Singh Kalepani Museum is in Siswan, Mohali district. The museum comprises five sections, containing his photographs and writings.
