= Vishwanath Mathur =

Indian independence activist

Vishwanath Mathur was an Indian independence activist. Also known as Biswanath, was arrested in 1930 for his anti-government activities. He was also jailed in Port Blair's Cellular Jail for his role in the Patna/Gaya Conspiracy Case as part of independence movement.

== 1934 Gaya Conspiracy Case - Independence movement ==
In year 1934, he along with other freedom fighters Dr Kesho Parsad, Shayama Charan Bharatwar, Mohit Chandra Adhikari, Suraj Nath Chaubey, Ram Pratap Singh, Kanai Lal Michir, Mahavir Michir, Shayam Krishna Agrawal, and Shamdev Narayan went to Cellular jail. He spent 4 years in cellular jail.

A founding member of the ex-Andaman Political Prisoners' Fraternity Circle, he also served as the President of the All India Freedom Fighters' Association.

== Post-independence activity ==
Initially, he was the member of Indian National Congress, later he joined Communist Party of India. In 2003, he criticized the Indian Parliament's decision to hang portrait of Vinayak Damodar Savarkar in the Parliament. He added Savarkar was a "coward being portrayed as a revolutionary".

He died in 2004 at the age of 92 due to cardiac arrest at the All India Institutes of Medical Sciences in New Delhi. Indian Prime minister Manmohan Singh said Mathur was a "cherished link with our freedom struggle".
