= Mohit Moitra =

Indian Bengali revolutionary

Mohit Mohan Moitra
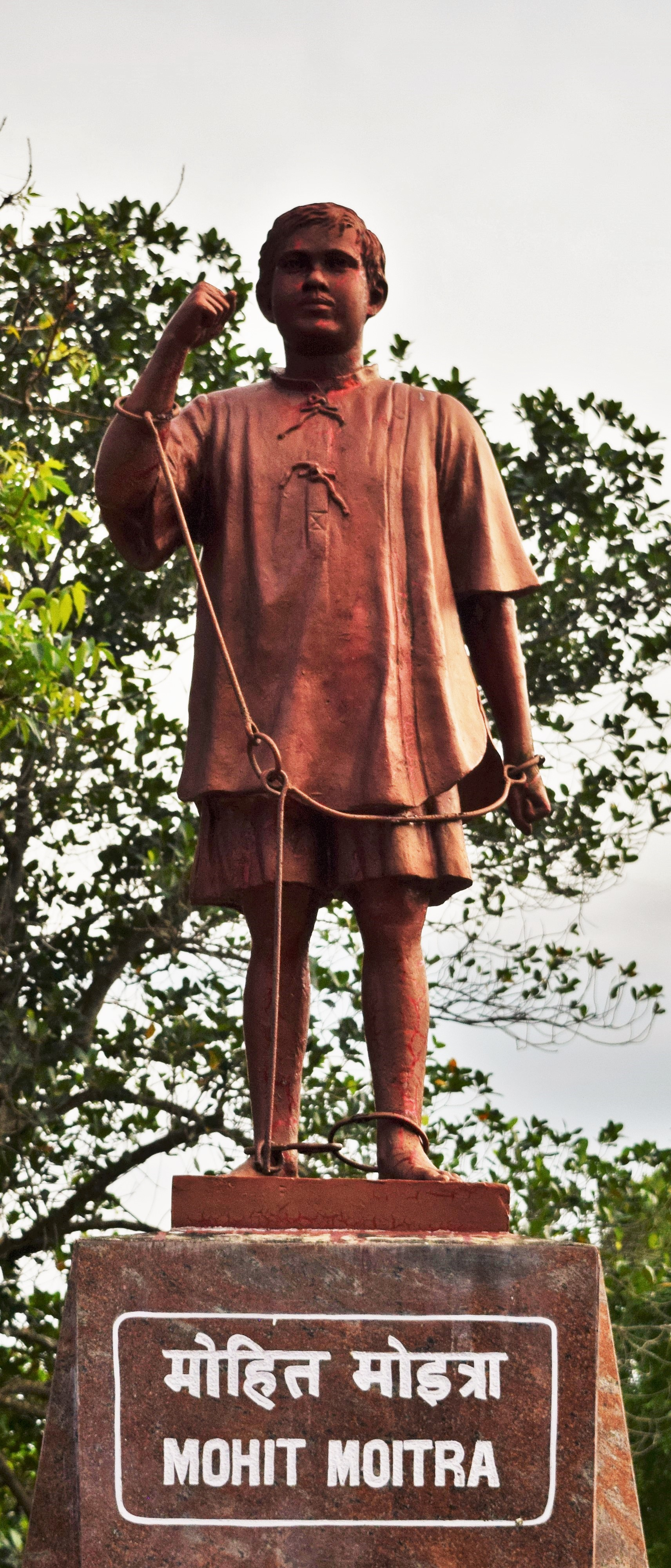
- Statue at Andaman's Cellular Jail
- Born: Natun Bharenga, Pabna, Bengal Presidency, British India
- Died: 28 May 1933; Cellular Jail, Andaman Islands, British India
- Cause of death: Force-feeding
- Organization: Jugantar
- Known for: Indian independence movement
- Father: Hemchandra Moitra

Mohit Mohan Moitra was an Indian revolutionary and Indian independence movement fighter in the 1930s.

== Early life ==
Mohan Moitra was born in British India at Natun Bharenga, Pabna to Hemchandra Moitra.

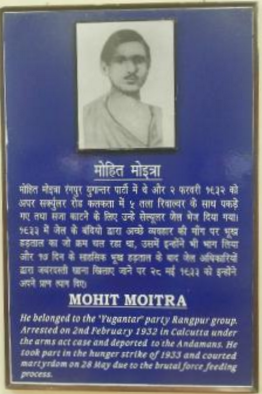
A commemorative to Mohan Moitra in Cellular Jail

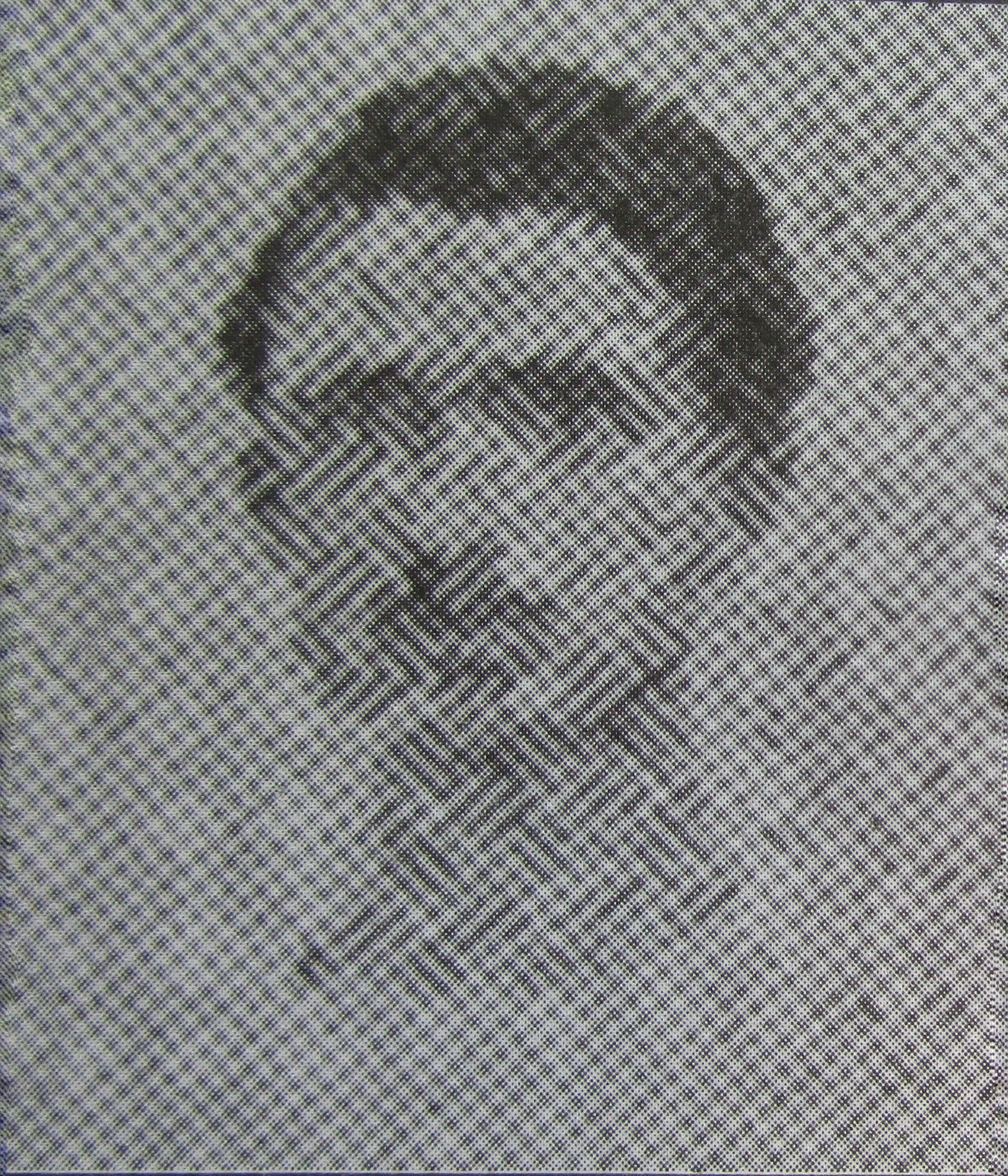

== Revolutionary activities ==
Mohan Moitra belonged to the Jugantar Party Rangpur Group. He was arrested on 2 February 1932 in Kolkata under the Arms Act Case. The police found a revolver and ammunition from his house. He was deported to the Cellular Jail in Andaman Islands for five years.

He took part in the Hunger Strike of 1933 to protest against the inhuman treatment meted out to the prisoners along with Mahavir Singh (convicted in Second Lahore Conspiracy Case) and Mohan Kishore Namadas (convicted in the Arms Act Case) and 30 others.

== Death ==
He was courted martyrdom on 28 May 1933 due to the brutal force feeding process. Mahavir Singh and Mohan Kishore Namadas also died due to pneumonia.
