= Batukeshwar Dutt =

Indian revolutionary (1910–1965)

Batukeshwar Dutta
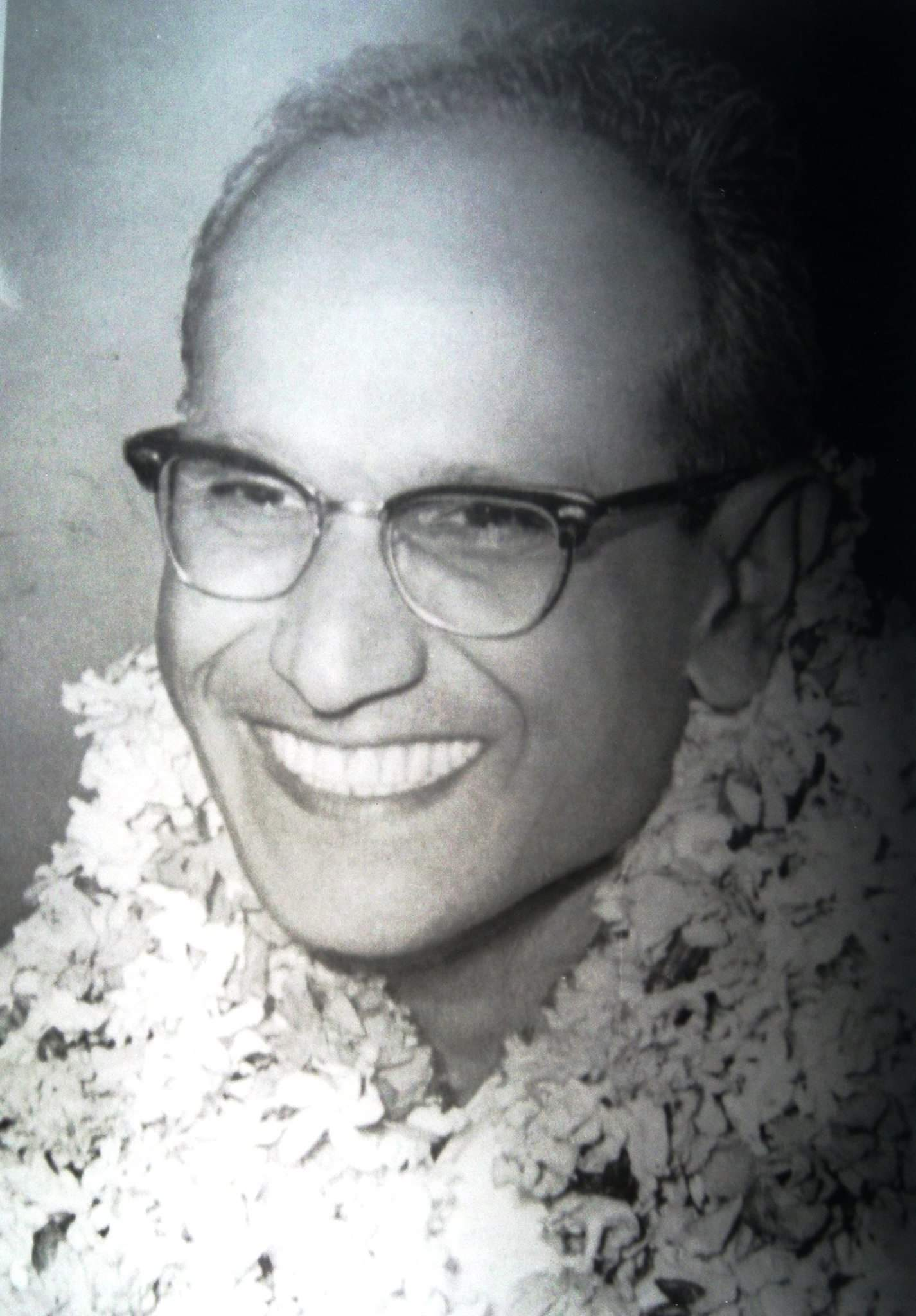
- Dutta in 1952
- Born: 18 November 1910; Khandaghosh, Bengal Presidency, British India (present-day West Bengal, India)
- Died: 20 July 1965 (aged 54); New Delhi, India
- Occupation: Freedom Fighter
- Organization(s): Hindustan Socialist Republican Association; Naujawan Bharat Sabha; Communist Consolidation
- Known for: Indian Freedom Movement
- Criminal penalty: Life imprisonment

Batukeshwar Dutta (or Dutta; 18 November 1910 – 20 July 1965) was an Indian socialist and independence fighter in the early 1900s. He is best known for having exploded two bombs, along with Bhagat Singh, in the Central Legislative Assembly in New Delhi on 8 April 1929. After they were arrested, tried and imprisoned for life, he and Singh initiated a historic hunger strike protesting against the abusive treatment of Indian political prisoners, and eventually secured some rights for them. He was also a member of the Hindustan Socialist Republican Association.

== Biography ==
Batukeshwar Dutta — also known as B. K. Dutta, Battu, and Mohan — was a son of Goshtha Bihari Dutta. He was born on 18 November 1910 in Onari, Khandaghosh village, Purba Bardhaman district, in what is now West Bengal in a Bengali kayastha family. He graduated from Pandit Prithi Nath High School in Kanpur. He was a close associate of freedom fighters such as Chandra Shekhar Azad and Bhagat Singh, the latter of whom he met in Cawnpore in 1924. He learned about bomb-making while working for the Hindustan Socialist Republican Association (HSRA).

== 1929 Assembly bomb throwing incident ==
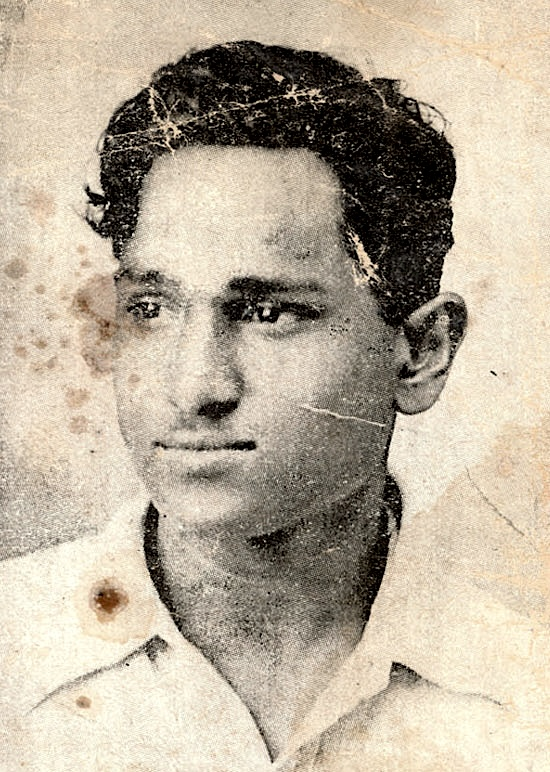
Photo of Dutt from a Lahore conspiracy case poster, c. 1930

To subdue the rise of revolutionaries like Bhagat Singh, the British government decided to implement the Defence of India Act 1915, which gave the police a free hand. Influenced by a French anarchist who bombed the French Chamber of Deputies, Singh proposed to the HSRA his plan to explode a bomb inside the Central Legislative Assembly, to which it agreed. Initially, it was decided that Dutt and Sukhdev Thapar would plant the bomb while Singh would travel to the USSR. However, later the plan was changed and Dutt was entrusted with planting it alongside Singh. On 8 April 1929, Singh and Dutta threw two bombs inside the assembly rushing from Visitor's Gallery. The smoke from the bomb filled the Hall and they shouted slogans of "Inquilab Zindabad!" (Hindi-Urdu: "Long Live the Revolution!") and showered leaflets. The leaflet claimed that the act was done to oppose the Trade Disputes and the Public Safety Bill being presented in the Central Assembly and the death of Lala Lajpat Rai. Few sustained injuries in the explosion and there were no deaths; Singh and Dutt claimed that the act was intentional. Singh and Dutta were arrested, as planned.

The Tribune reported the incident as:

When Mr Patel from India got up to give his ruling on the Public Safety Bill, two bombs were thrown from a gallery near the seat of George Schuster. The whole house was dispersed in the panic caused. George Schuster and B. Dalal were injured while few other members received minor injuries. Singh and Dutta were arrested by the British.

Ten minutes later, the Assembly got reassembled. The Chamber was filled with smoke. Mr Patel adjourned the House till next Thursday. A red pamphlet "Hindustan Socialist Republican Army" signed by Balraj, Honorary Chief, was thrown into the blazing fire.

The police locked the Council House and prevented the movement of the visitors. Sir J. Simon was also in the President's Gallery when the bomb fell. Sir G. Schuster, Sir B. Dalal, Mr Raghavendra Rao and Mr Shanker Rao were among the injured.

Dutt from Bengal and Singh from Punjab were arrested.

== Trial ==
Along with Bhagat Singh and Sukhdev Thapar, Dutt was tried in the Central Assembly Bomb Case, and was sentenced in 1929 to life imprisonment by the Sessions Judge of Delhi under Section 307 of the Indian Penal Code & Section 4 of the Explosive Substances Act. He was deported to the Cellular Jail, Andaman and Nicobar Islands. During their trial, Dutt and Singh conducted themselves with courage and dignity. They refused to recognize the authority of the court and used the trial as a platform to propagate their revolutionary ideals. They were sentenced to life imprisonment, and while in prison, they initiated a historic hunger strike to protest against the abusive treatment of Indian political prisoners.The hunger strike lasted for 63 days, during which time Dutt and Singh were subjected to brutal treatment by the prison authorities. However, their determination did not waver, and they continued with their strike until their demands were partially met.

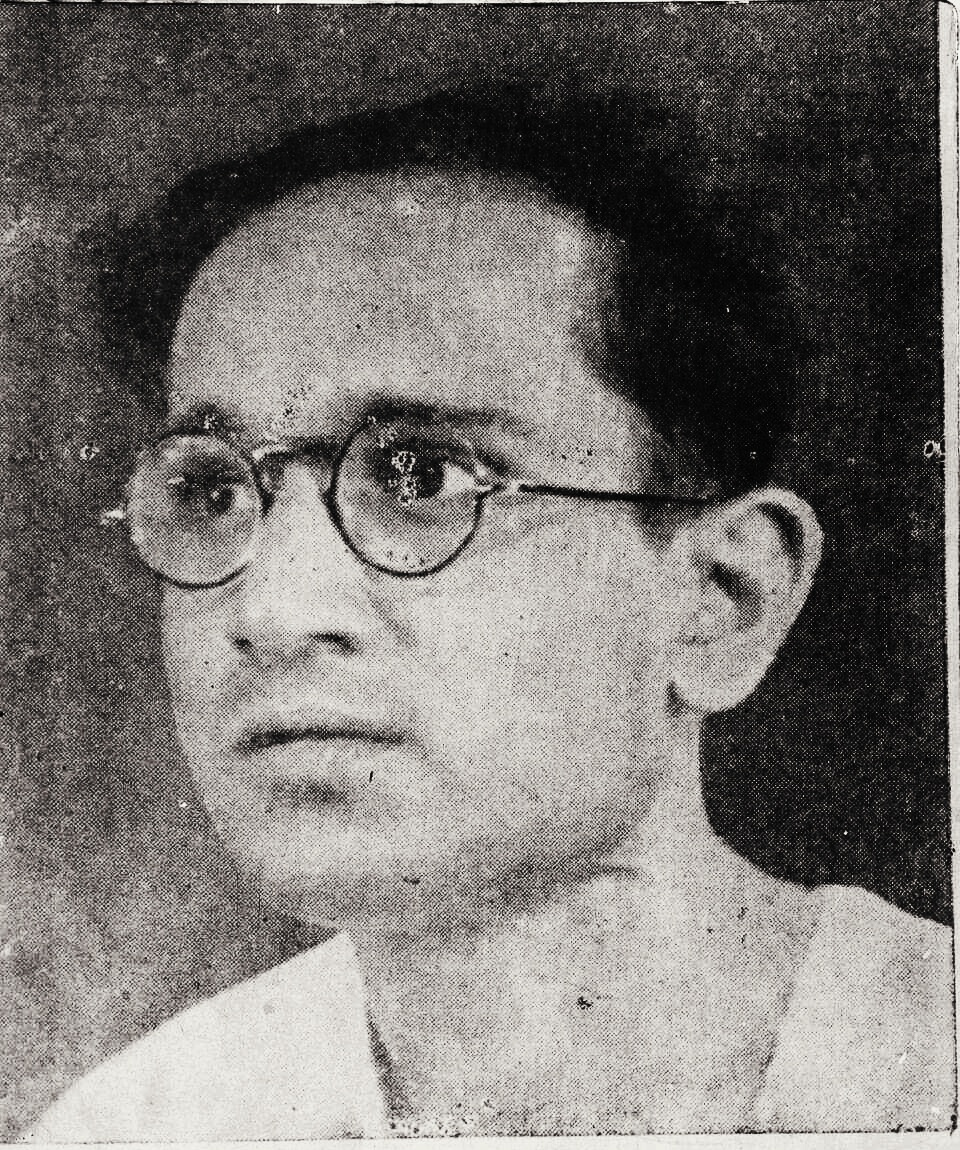
Batukeshswar Dutt, after his release from jail

== Last days ==
After his release from prison, Dutt contracted tuberculosis. He nonetheless participated in the Quit India Movement of Mahatma Gandhi and was again jailed for four years. He was lodged in Motihari Jail (in Champaran district of Bihar). After India gained independence, he married Anjali in November 1947. Dutt outlived all his comrades (except Jaidev Kapoor and Shiv Verma) and died two hours after the midnight of 19—20 July 1965 in the AIIMS hospital in Delhi after a long illness. He was cremated in Hussainiwala near Firozepur in Punjab where the bodies of his comrades Bhagat Singh, Shivaram Rajguru and Sukhdev Thapar were also cremated many years before. He was survived by his only daughter, Bharti Dutta Bagchi, in Patna where his house was situated in the Jakkanpur area. He was one of the writers of the film Shaheed (1965). During the filming of Shaheed, once the lead actor Manoj Kumar went to meet Bhagat Singh's mother, as she was not well at that time and was admitted in a hospital of Chandigarh. Kumar said that he met Dutt there.

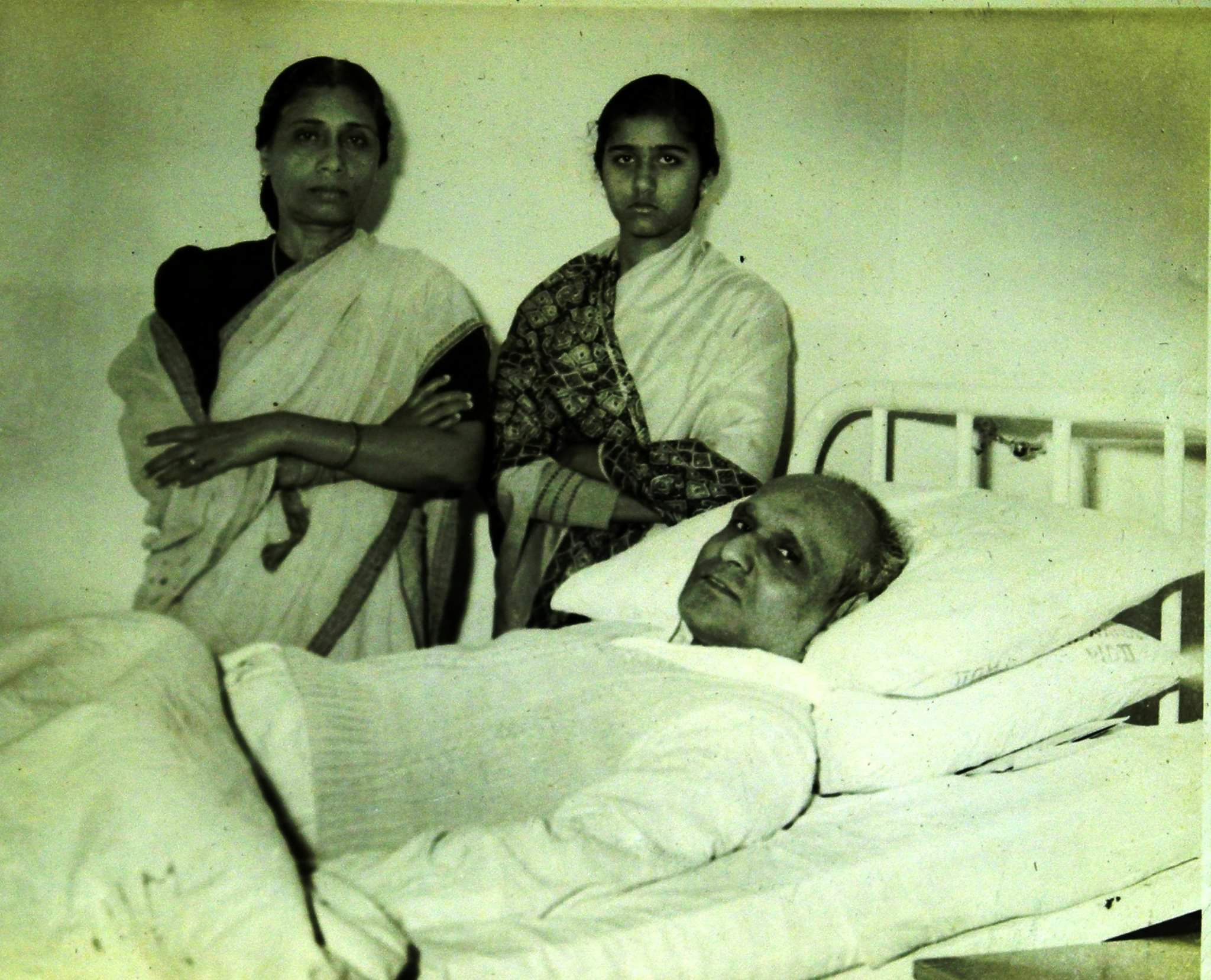
Dutt on his death bed in 1965 (his wife Anjali and daughter, Bharati are standing beside)

== Recognition ==
The B. K. Dutt Colony in New Delhi, located on a prime location opposite Safdarjung Airport and adjacent to Jor Bagh is named after Dutt. It is the nearest private residential colony near to AIIMS in New Delhi Municipal Council area.

Anil Verma wrote a book titled Batukeshwar Dutt: Bhagat Singh ke Sahyogi, which was released on the centenary of Dutt's birth. The book was published by the Government of India's publication service, the National Book Trust. It is the first book published on Dutt in any language.

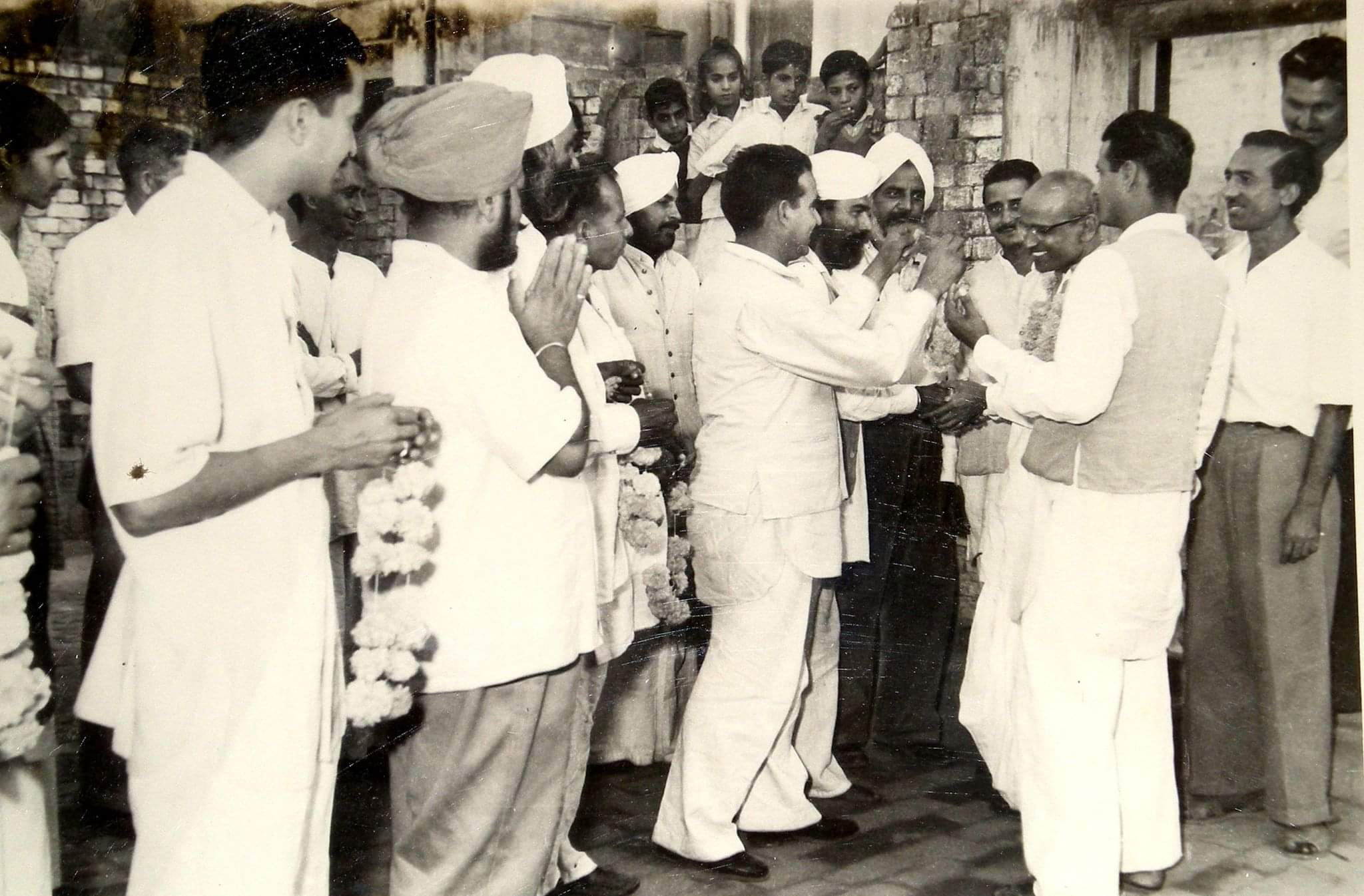
People garlanding Batukeshswar Dutt

== In popular culture ==
In Ki. Rajanarayanan's novel Gopallapurathu makkal (1989), Dutt is anachronistically mentioned as dead on the 56th day of his hunger-strike in 1929.

Bhaswar Chatterjee played the role of Dutta in the movie The Legend of Bhagat Singh (2002).

== See also ==
- Ashfaqulla Khan
- Kakori Train Robbery
