= The Legend of Bhagat Singh (soundtrack) =

The Legend of Bhagat Singh (Original Motion Picture Soundtrack)

Soundtrack album by A. R. Rahman
- Released: 8 May 2002
- Genre: Feature film soundtrack
- Length: 41:55
- Label: Tips
- Producer: A. R. Rahman

A. R. Rahman chronology
Parasuram (2003)	The Legend of Bhagat Singh (Original Motion Picture Soundtrack) (2002)	Warriors of Heaven and Earth (2003)

The Legend of Bhagat Singh (Original Motion Picture Soundtrack) is the soundtrack album to the 2002 film of the same name directed by Rajkumar Santoshi based on the life of Indian revolutionary Bhagat Singh and starred Ajay Devgan as Singh. A. R. Rahman composed the film's musical score and soundtrack, which featured eight songs written by Sameer and an adaptation of the Urdu poem "Sarfaroshi Ki Tamanna" penned by Bismil Azimabadi; most of the album featured slow-paced tunes. The album was released through Tips on 8 May 2002 to positive reviews, and Rahman won the Filmfare Award for Best Background Score and the Zee Cine Award for Best Background Music.

== Development ==
A. R. Rahman composed the soundtrack and score for The Legend of Bhagat Singh, in his second collaboration with Santoshi after Pukar (2000), and Sameer wrote the lyrics for the songs. In an interview with Arthur J. Pais of Rediff.com, Rahman said that Santoshi wanted him to compose songs that would stand apart from his other projects like Lagaan (2001) and Zubeidaa (2001).

Rahman took care to compose the tune for "Mera Rang De Basanti" in a slow-paced manner to avoid comparisons with the song "O Mera Rang De Basanti Chola" composed by Prem Dhawan for Shaheed (1965), which he and Santoshi found to be fast paced. He followed the same procedure for "Sarfaroshi Ki Tamanna", where he created a softer tune, saying that the "song is pictured on men who have fasted for over a month. How can I compose a high-sounding tune for that song?" According to Rahman, "Des Mere Des" had "some strains" from Lagaan's music. He further stated that he took "Santoshi's commitment to the film" as a source of inspiration to make an album that was "flavorsome [sic] and different."

During the composition process, Rahman experimented with Punjabi music more than he had done before on his previous soundtracks, receiving assistance from Sukhwinder Singh and Sonu Nigam. The soundtrack was completed within two months, with "Des Mere Des" recorded in an hour.

== Release ==
The album was distributed by Tips Industries, which also produced and distributed the film as well. It was launched at a public event in New Delhi on 8 May 2002 with the presence of veteran actress Farida Jalal, veteran music director Naushad, Samajwadi Party MP Amar Singh, alongside Devgan and Amrita Rao.

== Reception ==
The songs, especially "Mera Rang De Basanti" and "Sarfaroshi Ki Tamanna", received favourable reviews. A review carried by The Hindu said that while "Sarfaroshi Ki Tamanna" had a "forceful" impact, "Mera Rang De Basanti" and "Pagdi Sambhal Jatta" were "not the boom-boom types but subtly tuned". The review praised Rahman's ability "to impart the sombre and poignant mood" in all the album's songs "so well that despite being subdued, it retains the patriotic fervour". In the film review on the same newspaper, Chitra Mahesh added that the songs which were "rooted in Punjabi folk, serve more as the background than as separate elements [and] create a sense of melancholy sweeping the viewers through its flourishes, chords and notes". The Times of India-based Dominic Ferrao added that Rahman's "foot-tapping patriotic numbers are sure to scale up the charts".

Seema Pant of Rediff.com said that "Mera Rang De Basanti" and "Mahive Mahive" were "well rendered" by their respective singers and called "Sura So Pahchaniye" an "intense track, both lyrically as well as composition wise". Pant praised Sukhwinder Singh's "exquisite rendition" of "Pagdi Sambhal Jatta" and described the duet version of "Sarfaroshi Ki Tamanna" as having "been beautifully composed". She appreciated how the "tabla, santoor and flute gives this slow and soft number a classical touch." A critic from Sify said the music is "good". While Pant and the Sify reviewer concurred with Rahman that "Des Mere Des" was similar to Lagaan's music, the review in The Hindu compared the song to "Bharat Hum Ko Jaan Se Pyaara Hain" ("Thamizha Thamizha") from Roja (1992).

== Track listing ==
The Legend of Bhagat Singh (Original Motion Picture Soundtrack) track listing
No.	Title	Lyrics	Singer(s)	Length
1.	"Jogiya Jogiya"	Sameer	Alka Yagnik & Udit Narayan	5:46
2.	"Mera Rang De Basanti"	Sameer	Sonu Nigam & Manmohan Waris	5:12
3.	"Pagdi Sambhal Jatta"	Sameer	Sukhwinder Singh	5:00
4.	"Sarfaroshi Ki Tamanna"	Sameer	Sonu Nigam	1:53
5.	"Mahive Mahive"	Sameer	Alka Yagnik & Udit Narayan	5:31
6.	"Des Mere Des"	Sameer	A.R Rahman & Sukhwinder Singh	5:30
7.	"Kasam Tumko Watan"	Sameer	Sukhwinder Singh	2:22
8.	"Dil Se Niklegi"	Sameer	Sukhwinder Singh	3:39
9.	"Shora So Pehchaniye"	Sameer	Karthik, Raqueeb Alam & Sukhwinder Singh	1:26
10.	"Sarfaroshi Ki Tamanna" (Sad)	Bismil Azimabadi	Sonu Nigam & Hariharan	5:17
Total length:				41:55

== Accolades ==
Accolades for The Legend of Bhagat Singh (Original Motion Picture Soundtrack)
Award	Date of ceremony (Note: Date is linked to the article about the awards held that year, wherever possible.)	Category	Recipient(s) and nominee(s)	Result	Ref.
Bollywood Movie Awards	3 May 2003	Best Playback Singer – Male	Sukhwinder Singh (for "Pagdi Sambhal Jatta")	Won	
Filmfare Awards	21 February 2003	Best Background Score	A. R. Rahman	Won	
Zee Cine Awards	11 January 2003	Best Background Music	A. R. Rahman	Won	

== Sources ==
- Tips Official (18 August 2011). The Legend of Bhagat Singh – Movie Making – Ajay Devgan (Motion picture) (in Hindi). India. Archived from the original on 28 March 2018 – via YouTube.
- Ausaja, S. M. M. (2009). Bollywood in Posters. Noida: Om Books International. p. 243. ISBN 978-81-87108-55-9.
