= Anjuman-e-Taraqqi-e-Urdu Bihar =

Organisation for the promotion of Urdu

Anjuman-e-Tarraqi-e-Urdu Bihar is a registered organisation working for the promotion and dissemination of Urdu language, literature and culture across Bihar. It was registered in 1995. It runs in all 38 districts of Bihar with their representatives. It has once a collection thousands of rare Books in the Library of Anjuman-e-Tarraqi-e-Urdu Bihar.

== History ==
It was established by Khan Bahadur Ibrahim Hussain, Justice Akhtar Hussain, Bismil Azimabadi.

In February 2022, Abdul Qaiyum Ansari, secretary of the organisation along with Mohd Zama Khan, minister of Minority Welfare Department in the Government of Bihar launched the Website of Anjuman-e-Tarraqi-e-Urdu Bihar.
