= Gil Alon =

Israeli actor and singer

- גיל אלון
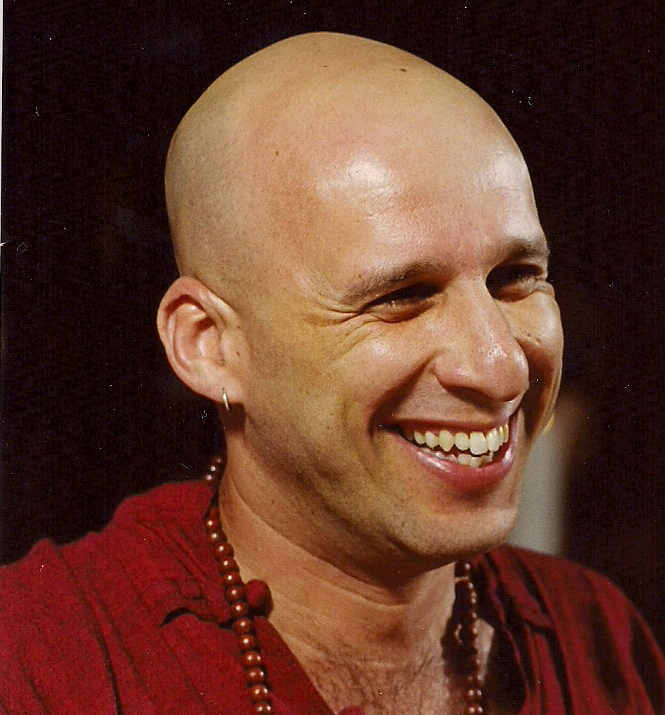
- Gil Alon
- Born: 29 April 1960 (age 66); Ramat Gan, Israel
- Occupations: Zen master, singer, actor, theater director and teacher
- Years active: 1976–present
- Awards: A Laureate of the "World Peace Ambassador 2015" award from Save The World Foundation. A lifetime honor membership at the Asian Academy for Film & Television (AAFT) – New Delhi, India. First Prize award for the play "Interview" – Arena Festival – Germany – 1995. Best director award for the play "Mein Kampf" – Israel's national festival for contemporary theater – 2011.

Gil Alon (Hebrew: גיל אלון; born 1960), is a Portuguese-Israeli Zen master, singer, actor, theater director and teacher. In 2000 Gil was certified as a Zen Master in Japan . A Laureate of the "World Peace Ambassador 2015" award from Save The World Foundation. He has a lifetime honor membership at the Asian Academy for Film & Television (AAFT) – New Delhi, India.

== Biography ==
=== Early years ===
Alon was born in Ramat Gan, Israel. At the age of 14, he joined a number of drama courses in which he played among others the leading role in "The Bear" by Anton Chekhov . At 16 he played the role of Eilif in "An Enemy of the People" by Henrik Ibsen at Habima, Israel's national theater (1976) directed by Yossi Izraeli.

=== Theater ===
==== Acting ====
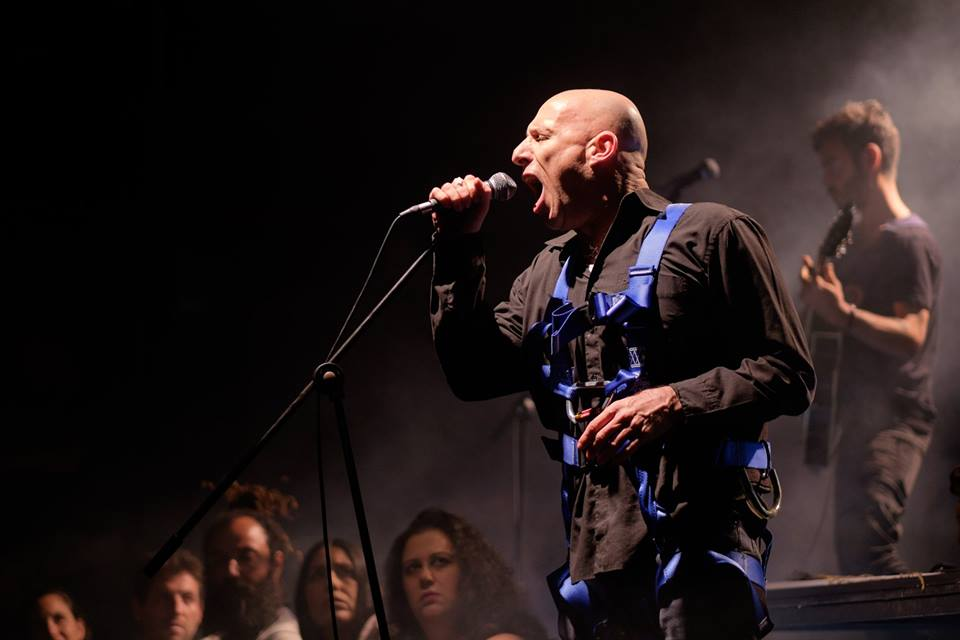
Gil Alon as Hamlet in "Hamlet Machine"

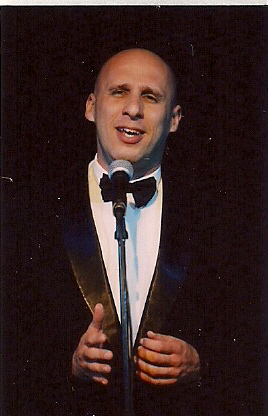
"Jacques" – Gil Alon Sing and Say Jacques Brel

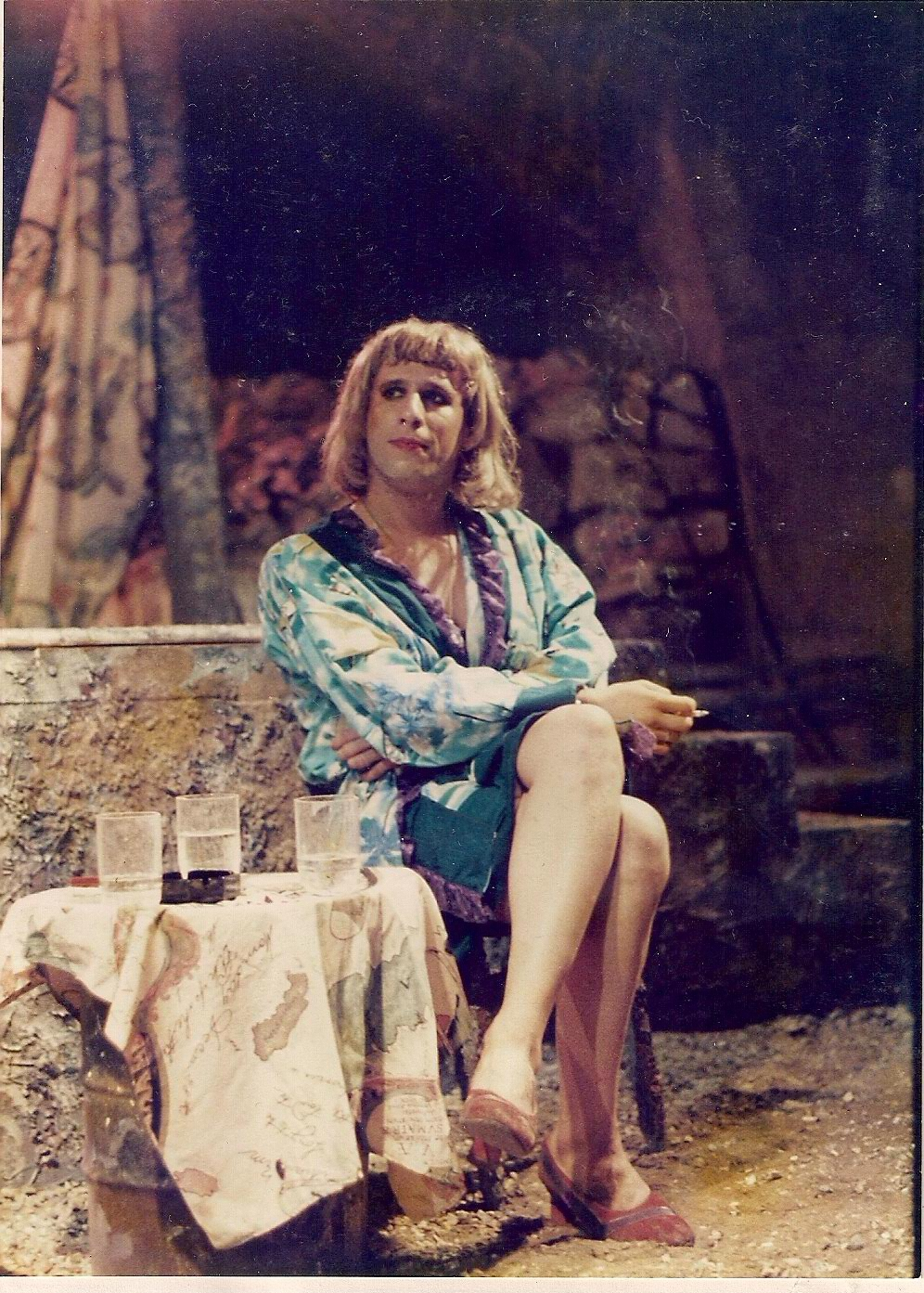
As the transgenger in the play "Alive"

Gil Alon spent his army service as an actor at the IDF's theater, performing among others in: "Our Town" by Thornton Wilder and "The Zoo Story" by Edward Albee(as Jerry). After his service was completed, he was accepted to Nissan Nativ Drama school (1980–1982), and performed during his graduation year among others in the following plays: "Don Juan" by Michel de Ghelderode, "Twelfth Night" by William Shakespeare, "Saved" by Edward Bond and "Too True to Be Good" by George Bernard Shaw.

Alon played a long series of roles in the repertoire theater and the fringe, specializing in historical characters, among which are Adolf Hitler, Heinrich Himmler, Milan Kundera, Jacques Brel, Leonard Cohen, Alexander Penn, Lord Irwin (The British Viceroy in India) and Charles J. Guiteau(Assassin of the USA president James A. Garfield). He participated among others in the following productions: "Ghetto" by Joshua Sobol, "Much Ado About Nothing" by William Shakespeare, "The Trojan War Will Not Take Place" by Jean Giraudoux, "Penn" (as the Israeli poet Alexander Penn), "Assassins" by Stephen Sondheim, "Jud Süß" by Paul Kornfeld, "A Clockwork Orange" by Anthony Burgess, "Side by Side by Sondheim", "From Crystal to Smoke" by Jacques Attali (as Heinrich Himmler),"The Chinese" by Murray Schisgal, "Five screams" (based on Milan Kundera's "The Unbearable Lightness of Being", represented Israel at the Edinburgh Festival), "The Goldberg Variations" by George Tabori (as God), "Little Shop of Horrors" by Alan Menken and Howard Ashman, "Water Drops on Burning Rocks" by Rainer Werner Fassbinder, "On Tidy Endings" by Harvey Fierstein, Medea by Euripides (as Jason), "Hamlet Machine" by Heiner Müller (as Hamlet),"Antigone" by Sophocles (as King Creon), "Leonard" (as the singer and poet Leonard Cohen). Alon also played in the first "nonsense" productions for kids in the Israeli theater. In the early 1990s he created his solo stand up show "Non–Stop".

Since the year 2000, Gil traveled in 5 continents and 50 countries. The journey led him to fascinating discoveries and encounters with actors and artists around the world.

Alon performed, directed and conducted workshops in Nepal, The Philippines, Australia, Fiji, Belgium, Cambodia, the Netherlands, United Kingdom, Malta, Egypt, the United States, Canada, Puerto Rico, Samoa, Singapore, Brazil, Poland, Tanzania, Mauritius, Rwanda, Maldives, Sri Lanka, Senegal, Benin, Albania, North Macedonia and Kosovo, Cape Verde, Andorra, Spain, Bahrain and The United Arab Emirates.

Participated in the Butoh production "The Flower Of The Universe" – directed and performed by the world-famous Japanese Butoh masters – Kazuo Ono and Yoshito Ono – Yokohama – Japan. Performed his solo drama "Mister C" which he also wrote and directed and premiered in Melbourne, Australia. The play was then performed in 10 countries around the globe.

==== Directing ====
In addition to his work as an actor, Alon directed plays in Israel and abroad. In Israel he directed: "Interview" by Jean-Claude van Itallie with "The Left Bank" theater group which won the first prize in the Arena International Theater Festival in Germany, "Mein Kampf" by George Tabori which won the best director award and 3 best acting awards in the Israeli national festival for contemporary theater and The Golden Hedgehog award for best actor, "The Balcony" by Jean Genet. He also directed overseas: Salome by Oscar Wilde – Bombay, India; "Six Characters in Search of an Author" by Luigi Pirandello; "Woyzeck" by Georg Buchner and “Life of an Actor” – Madras, India; "Buddhist Bible 4" – Bangkok, Thailand; "Five" – New Zealand, "A Room With Soft Light" – South Korea, "My Fado" – Lisbon, Portugal, and "The Invisible Village" – Taipei, Taiwan.

==== Teaching ====
Gil was a diction and dialog coach teacher at the Yoram Levinstein acting school and at the theater faculty at The Tel Aviv University. Gil created a workshop on creativity – "Into The moment – A Journey to the Innermost Intuition" which he teaches in Israel and around the world.

=== Public roles ===
Along the years, Alon was part of the artistic board, a jury member and a lector in Acco Israeli Fringe Festival, the Haifa Kids Theater Festival, Tmuna Theater, Tsavta Theater, at the Art and Education ministry and at The Orna porat Youth Theater.

- 1995–1999 – founded and was the Artistic Director of the "Theater in Slippers Festival" in Tel Aviv
- 2009–2012 – Artistic Director of the "Testing Tools" festival in Tel Aviv
- 2013–2016 – Artistic Director of the Israeli national festival for contemporary theater (The Acco Festival)
- 2020-2024 – Founder and Artistic Director of "Joining Tools" festival – Tel-Aviv

Since 2010 – Artistic Director of Ezuz – a multi-disciplinary art group

=== Music ===
Alon Founded the poetry rock band "Sinteza" and was the leading singer of the rock bands "Autumn" and "Passepartout". Recorded three solo albums: "Dream Alley" (among those who composed specially for this album are Sasha Argov, Rami Fortis, Danny Robas) and "Gil Alon Sings Jacques Brel" And "Poetry Is In The Air" – all lyrics by Yoni Lahav, composed and arranged by Yuval Havkin. . He also participated in the collection album "The New" in a duet with Corinne Alal. Alon was invited to sing for the UN in the national holocaust memorial day ceremony (UNCC) in Bangkok and in the Taj hotel in Mumbai, India. He was invited to Brazil to sing in a concert with 6 Bosa-Nova musicians, and to Japan to sing in a series of concerts in Jazz clubs in Tokyo. He was also asked to sing the songs of Jacques Brel in a special series of concerts with the string quartet of the Israel Philharmonic Orchestra and the pianist Astrit Balzan.

==== Musicals ====
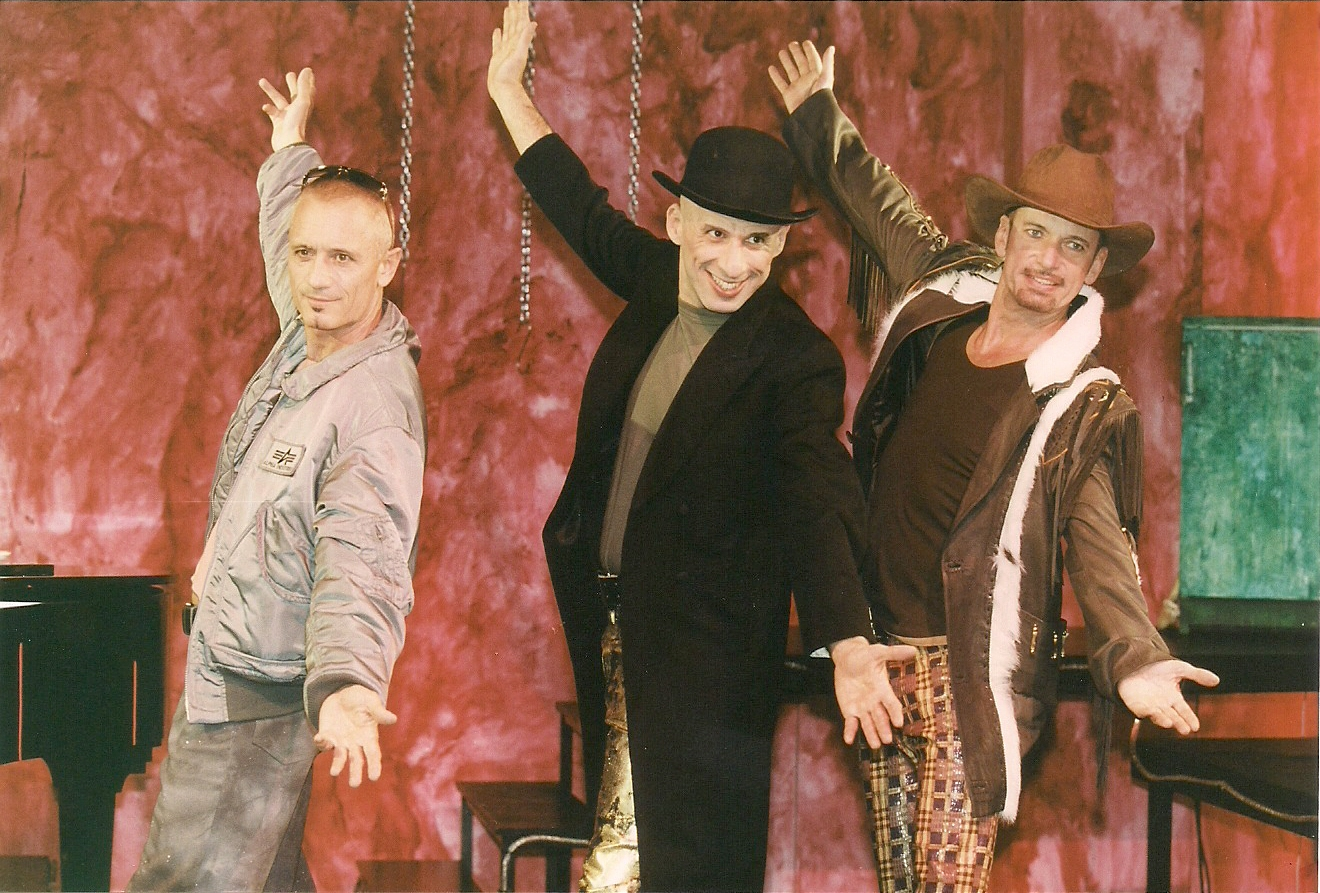
In the musical Men of Mahagonny in Germany

Alon participated in Little Shop of Horrors as Mr. Mushnik, The Hunchback of Notre Dame as Frollo, Side by Side by Sondheim, Assassins, as Charles J. Guiteau, Two Kuni Lemel (The Flying Matchmaker) as Rebbe Pinchas, Pen as Alexander Pen. He participated in the musical Life Begins at 40 which toured in The US, Canada and Puerto Rico, and in Kurt Weill's Men of Mahagonny in Germany.

==== On concert stages ====
Alon cooperated as singer, actor and narrator with the Musicia Nova contemporary music orchestra in "Tel Aviv Pictures" (Moshe Zorman), "Soldier's Tale" (Igor Stravinsky), "Gniton and Gnitemus" (Abel Ehrlich), "Lecture on the Weather" (John Cage). With the Israel Sinfonietta Beer Sheva: "La clemenza di Tito" (Wolfgang Amadeus Mozart), "Peter and the Wolf" (Sergei Prokofiev), "The Carnival of the Animals" (Camille Saint-Saëns), with the Tel Aviv Opera Workshop:"Die Fledermaus" (Johann Strauss II), and also in "The Mikado" (Gilbert and Sullivan),"Visions" (Leon Schidlowsky). Alon cooperated with the Nuremberg Symphony Orchestra performing pieces by Arik Shapira and Yosef Tal in Berlin.

=== TV, film and radio ===
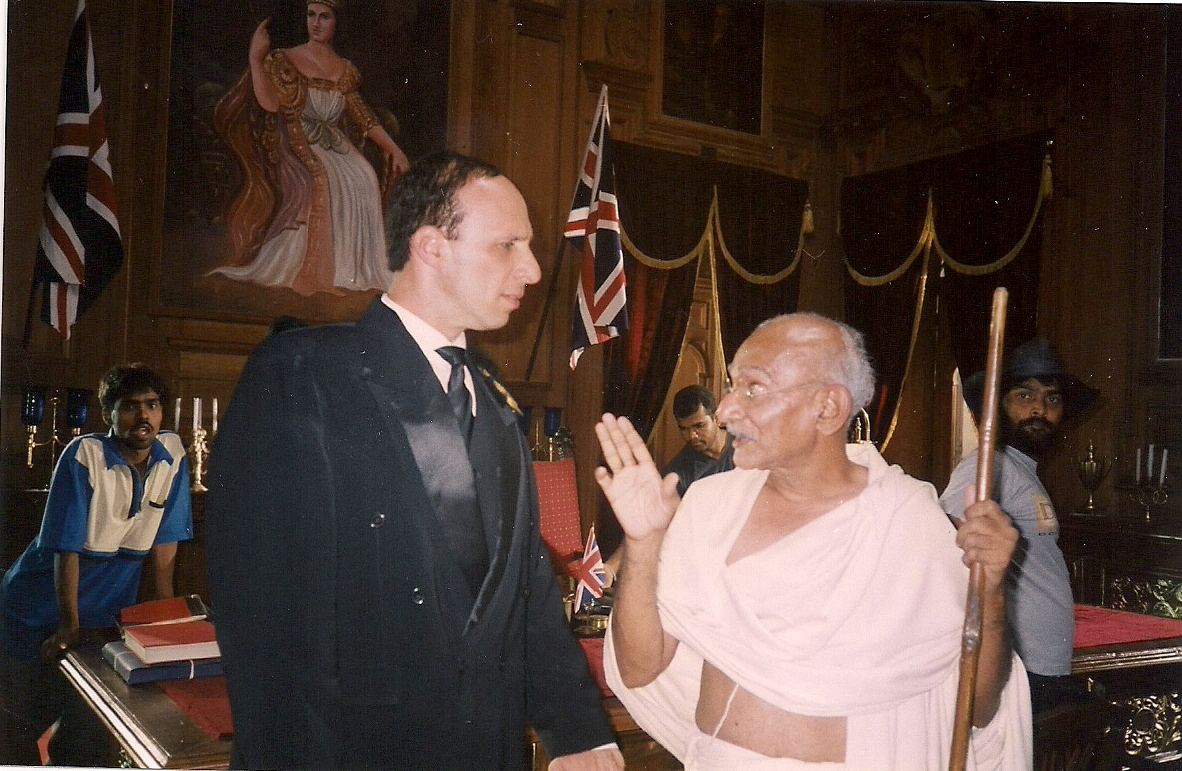
Alon as Lord Irwin, the British Viceroy along with Surendra Rajan playing Gandhi in the movie Legend of Bhagat Singh

Gil Alon participated in TV, film and radio shows starting at the early 1980s and played on several popular children and adult shows. He was the host of the Israeli version of "Lingo" (aired at channel 2), and the host of "A Look at the Opera" (aired at the Israeli discovery channel). Alon was also a guest actor in the Israeli versions of "Sesame Street" and "All in the family".

Played in Assi Dayan's films: "Electric Blanket Syndrome” and “Mr. Baum”, in Raphael Rebibo's film “Amor” and leading role in the Indian film "The Legend of Bhagat Singh", that was filmed in Bollywood.

Editor and host of "Side Wind" – a program on philosophy and spirituality, and of "Front Row" – a program on theater on "Kol Israel", the Israeli national radio station.

== Zen Buddhism ==
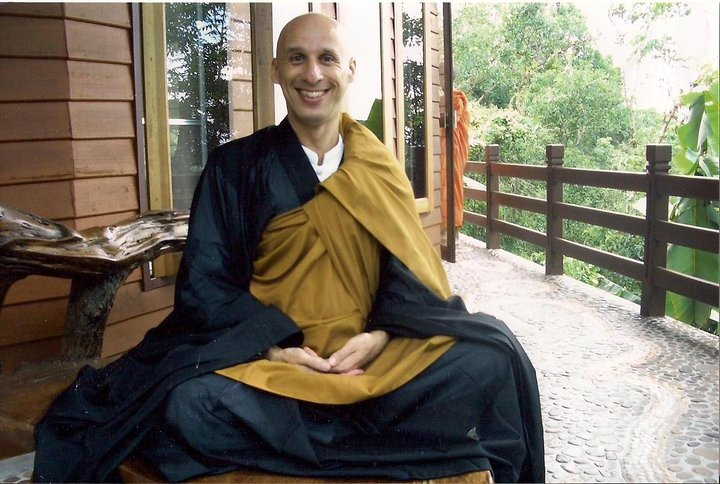
Teaching Zen in south Thailand

Gil graduated the Zen department in "Medicin College", where he became a teacher. An initiated disciple and a Dharma Heir of Gudo Waffu Nishijima Roshi in Japan, Soto Sect, the Dogen Sangha lineage. In June 2000 he received a Dharma Transmission.

== Books ==
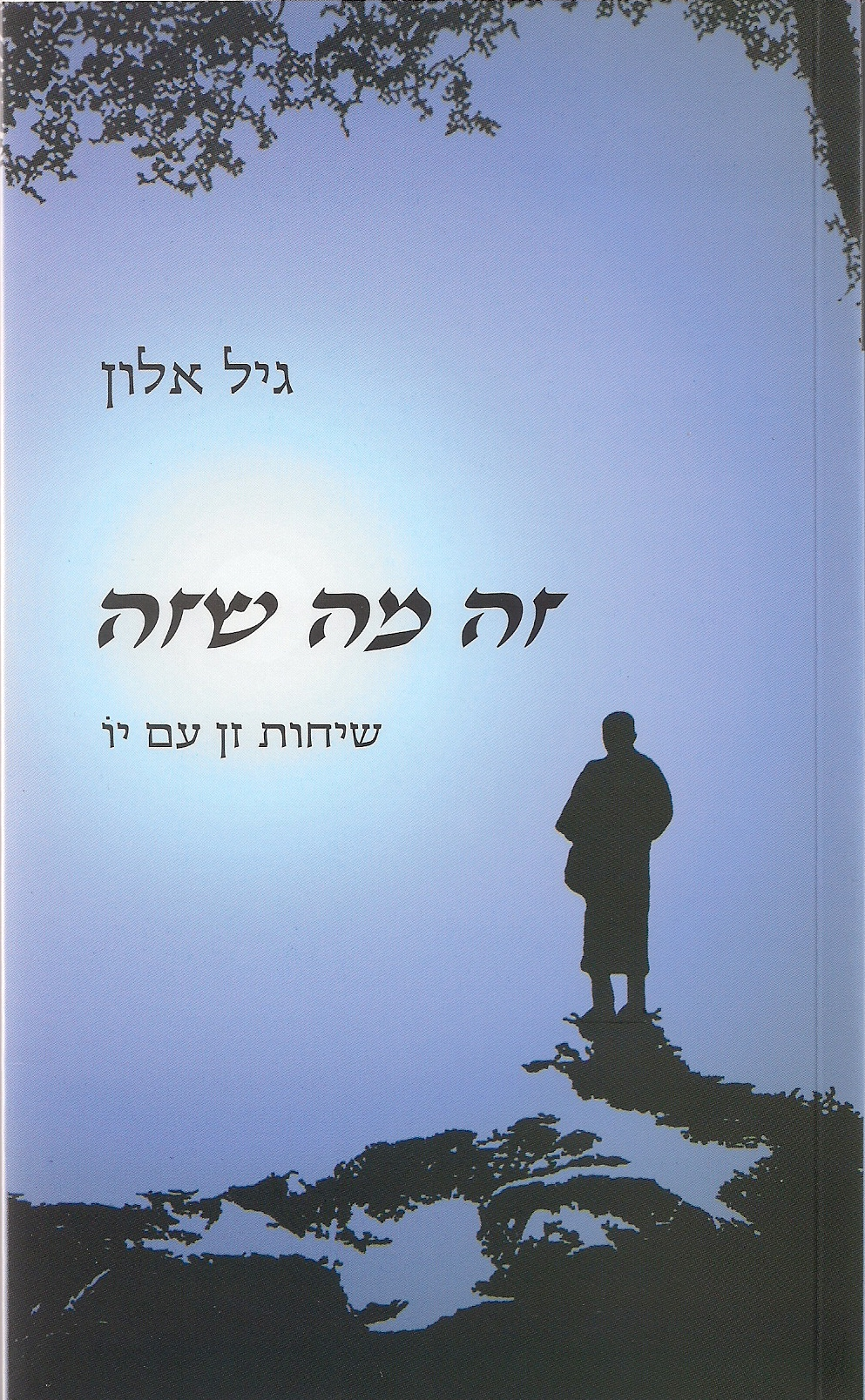
The cover of the book "It Is What It Is" – Zen Talks with Yo

Alon's poems were published in several newspapers and literature magazines in Israel.

Wrote the books: "Combinations" – poetry, "Just A Moment" – a diary of a travel to the far east,"It Is What It Is" – Zen talks with Yo and “The Journey’s Poetry” - poetry.
