= Folie à deux =

Shared psychosis, a psychotic disorder

Induced delusional disorder
- Other names: Shared psychosis, Lasègue–Falret syndrome, induced delusional disorder, shared psychotic disorder
- Pronunciation: UK: /ˈfɒli æ ˈdɜː/ US: /foʊˌliː ə ˈdʌ/ French: [fɔli a dø]
- Specialty: Psychiatry

Folie à deux (French for 'madness of two'), also called shared psychosis or shared delusional disorder (SDD), is a rare psychiatric syndrome in which symptoms of a delusional belief are "transmitted" from one individual to another.

The disorder, first conceptualized in 19th century French psychiatry by Charles Lasègue and Jules Falret, is also known as Lasègue–Falret syndrome. Recent psychiatric classifications refer to the syndrome as shared psychotic disorder (DSM-IV – 297.3) and induced delusional disorder (ICD-10 – F24), although the research literature largely uses the original name. The same syndrome shared by more than two people may be called folie à trois ('three') or quatre ('four'); and further, folie en famille ('family madness') or even folie à plusieurs ('madness of several').

This disorder is not in the current, fifth edition of the Diagnostic and Statistical Manual of Mental Disorders (DSM-5), which considers the criteria to be insufficient or inadequate. The DSM-5 does not consider shared psychotic disorder (folie à deux) as a separate entity; rather, the physician should classify it as "Delusional Disorder" or in the "Other Specified Schizophrenia Spectrum and Other Psychotic Disorder" category.

== Signs and symptoms ==
This syndrome is most commonly diagnosed when the two or more individuals of concern live in proximity, may be socially or physically isolated, and have little interaction with other people.

Various sub-classifications of folie à deux have been proposed to describe how the delusional belief comes to be held by more than one person:

Folie imposée (imposed psychosis)
Where a dominant person (known as the 'primary', 'inducer', or 'principal') initially forms a delusional belief during a psychotic episode and imposes it on another person or persons (the 'secondary', 'acceptor', or 'associate'). Normally the latter, described as "un malade par reflet", does not suffer from a true psychosis. If the parties are admitted to hospital separately, the delusions in the person with the induced beliefs are typically abandoned.
Folie simultanée (simultaneous psychosis)
Either the situation where two people considered to independently experience psychosis influence the content of each other's delusions so they become identical or strikingly similar, or one in which two people "morbidly predisposed" to delusional psychosis mutually trigger symptoms in each other. Due to the lack of a dominant partner, separation of patients might not improve the condition of either.
Folie communiquée (communicated psychosis)
Similar to folie imposée where the primary individual imposes the delusional belief on another. The latter assumes the same delusion after a period of time and develops their own delusional content not entirely derived from the initial primary's belief. Contrary to folie imposée, separation of the individuals will not improve the condition of either.
Folie induite (induced psychosis)
An uncommon sub-classification where the delusion of an individual with existing psychosis is enhanced by the delusional content of another person with psychosis. This may be seen in a hospital setting where both are patients.

Folie à deux and its more populous derivatives are psychiatric curiosities. The current Diagnostic and Statistical Manual of Mental Disorders states that a person cannot be diagnosed as being delusional if the belief in question is one "ordinarily accepted by other members of the person's culture or subculture". It is not clear at what point a belief considered to be delusional escapes from the folie à... diagnostic category and becomes legitimate because of the number of people holding it. When a large number of people may come to believe obviously false and potentially distressing things based purely on hearsay, these beliefs are not considered to be clinical delusions by the psychiatric profession, and are instead labelled as mass hysteria.

As with most psychological disorders, the extent and type of delusion varies, but the non-dominant person's delusional symptoms usually resemble those of the inducer. Prior to therapeutic interventions, the inducer typically does not realize that they are causing harm, but instead believe they are helping the second person to become aware of vital or otherwise notable information.

=== Type of delusions ===
Psychology Today magazine defines delusions as "fixed beliefs that do not change, even when a person is presented with conflicting evidence." Types of delusion include:

Bizarre delusions
Those which are clearly implausible and not understood by peers within the same culture, even those with psychological disorders; for example, if one thought that all of their organs had been taken out and replaced by someone else's while they were asleep without leaving any scar and without their waking up. It would be impossible to survive such a procedure, and even surgery involving transplantation of multiple organs would leave the person with severe pain, visible scars, etc.
Non-bizarre delusions
Common among those with personality disorders and are understood by people within the same culture. For example, unsubstantiated or unverifiable claims of being followed by the FBI in unmarked cars and watched via security cameras would be classified as a non-bizarre delusion; while it would be unlikely for the average person to experience such a predicament, it is possible, and therefore understood by those around them.
Mood-congruent delusions
These correspond to a person's emotions within a given timeframe, especially during an episode of mania or depression. For example, someone with this type of delusion may believe with certainty that they will win $1 million at the casino on a specific night, despite lacking any way to see the future or influence the probability of such an event. Similarly, someone in a depressive state may feel certain that their mother will get hit by lightning the next day, again in spite of having no means of predicting or controlling future events.
Mood-neutral delusions
These are unaffected by mood, and can be bizarre or non-bizarre; the formal definition provided by Mental Health Daily is "a false belief that isn't directly related to the person's emotional state." An example would be a person who is convinced that somebody has switched bodies with their neighbor, the belief persisting irrespective of changes in emotional status.

=== Biopsychosocial effects ===
As with many psychiatric disorders, shared delusional disorder can negatively impact the psychological and social aspects of a person's wellbeing. Unresolved stress resulting from a delusional disorder will eventually contribute to or increase the risk of other negative health outcomes, such as cardiovascular disease, diabetes, obesity, immunological problems, and others. These health risks increase with the severity of the disease, especially if an affected person does not receive or comply with adequate treatment.

People with a delusional disorder have a significantly high risk of developing psychiatric comorbidities such as depression and anxiety. This may be attributable to a genetic pattern shared by 55% of SDD patients.

Shared delusional disorder can have a profoundly negative impact on a person's quality of life. Persons diagnosed with a mental health disorder commonly experience social isolation, which is detrimental to psychological health. This is especially problematic with SDD, as social isolation contributes to the onset of the disorder; in particular, relapse is likely if returning to an isolated living situation, in which shared delusions can be reinstated.

== Causes ==
While the exact causes of SDD are unknown, the main two contributors are stress and social isolation.

People who are socially isolated together tend to become dependent on those they are with, leading to an inducer becoming able to influence those around them. Additionally, people developing shared delusional disorder do not have others reminding them that their delusions are either impossible or unlikely. As a result, treatment for shared delusional disorder includes those affected be removed from the inducer.

Stress is also a factor, as it is a common factor in mental illness developing or worsening. The majority of people that develop shared delusional disorder are genetically predisposed to mental illness, but this predisposition alone is not enough to develop SDD. In other words, stress is a risk factor of this disorder. When stressed, an individual's adrenal gland releases the stress hormone cortisol into the body, increasing the brain's level of dopamine; this change can be linked to the development of a mental illness, such as a shared delusional disorder.

While there is no exact cause of shared psychosis, there are several factors that are contributors depending on different cultures and communities and taking into consideration the individual's circumstances, including their environmental changes and relationships.

== Diagnosis ==
Shared delusional disorder is often difficult to diagnose. Usually, the person with the condition does not seek out treatment, as they do not realize that their delusion is abnormal, as it comes from someone in a dominant position whom they trust. Furthermore, since their delusion comes on gradually and grows in strength over time, their doubt is slowly weakened during this time. Shared delusional disorder is diagnosed using the DSM-5, and according to this, the patient must meet three criteria:

1. They must have a delusion that develops in the context of a close relationship with an individual exhibiting an already established delusion.
2. The delusion must be very similar or even identical to the one already established in the primary case.
3. The delusion cannot be better explained by any other psychological disorder, mood disorder with psychological features, as a direct result of physiological effects of substance abuse or any general medical condition.

=== Related phenomena ===
Reports have stated that a phenomenon similar to folie à deux was induced by the military incapacitating agent BZ in the late 1960s. The chemical, also known as 3-quinuclidinyl benzilate, was being researched as a potential incapacitating agent, and its effects on mental state, including inducing a shared delusion, were observed in research studies.

=== Prevalence ===
Shared delusional disorder is most commonly found in women with slightly above-average IQs, who are isolated from their family, and who are in relationships with a dominant person who has delusions. The majority of secondary cases (people who develop the shared delusion) also meet the criteria for dependent personality disorder, which is characterized by a pervasive fear that leads them to need constant reassurance, support, and guidance. Additionally, 55% of secondary cases had a relative with a psychological disorder that included delusions and, as a result, the secondary cases are usually susceptible to mental illness.

== Treatment ==
After diagnosis, the next step is to determine the proper course of treatment. The first step is to separate the formerly healthy person from the inducer, and see if the delusion goes away or lessens over time. If this is not enough to stop the delusions, there are two possible courses of action: medication or therapy. Therapy can be provided as both personal therapy or family therapy.

=== Medication ===
If the separation alone is not working, antipsychotics are often prescribed for a short time to prevent the delusions. Antipsychotics are medications that reduce or relieve symptoms of psychosis such as delusions or hallucinations (seeing or hearing something that is not there). Other uses of antipsychotics include stabilizing moods for people with mood swings and mood disorders (i.e. in bipolar patients), reducing anxiety in anxiety disorders, and lessening tics in people with Tourettes. Antipsychotics do not cure psychosis, but they do help reduce symptoms; when paired with therapy, the person with the condition has the best chance of recovering. While antipsychotics are powerful, and often effective, they do have side effects, such as inducing involuntary movements. They should only be taken if absolutely required, and under the supervision of a psychiatrist.

=== Therapy ===
The two most common forms of therapy for patients are personal and family therapy.

Personal therapy is one-on-one counseling that focuses on building a relationship between the counselor and the patient, and aims to create a positive environment where the patient feels that they can speak freely and truthfully. This is advantageous, as the counselor can usually get more information out of the patient to get a better idea of how to help them. Additionally, if the patient trusts what the counselor says, disproving the delusion will be easier.

Family therapy is a technique in which the entire family comes into therapy together to work on their relationships, and to find ways to eliminate the delusion within the family dynamic. For example, if someone's sister is the inducer, the family will have to get involved to ensure the two stay apart, and to sort out how the family dynamic will work around that. The more support a patient has, the more likely they are to recover, especially since SDD usually occurs due to social isolation.

== Society and culture ==
=== Notable cases ===
- On 23 May 1997 the mutilated body of Michael McMorrow was found floating into the lake in Central Park. He had been stabbed over 30 times, disemboweled, and had parts of his hand and nose severed. Two 15-year-olds, Daphne Abdela and Christopher Vasquez, were convicted for the brutal murder. They were nicknamed Baby-Faced Butchers.
- In May 2008, in the case of twin sisters Ursula and Sabina Eriksson, Ursula ran into the path of an oncoming articulated lorry, sustaining severe injuries. Sabina then immediately duplicated her twin's actions by stepping into the path of an oncoming car; both sisters survived the incident with severe but non-life-threatening injuries. It was later claimed that Sabina Eriksson was a "secondary" sufferer of folie à deux, influenced by the presence or perceived presence of her twin sister Ursula, the "primary". Sabina later told an officer at the police station, "We say in Sweden that an accident rarely comes alone. Usually at least one more follows—maybe two." However, upon her release from hospital, Sabina behaved erratically before stabbing a man to death.
- Psychiatrist Reginald Medlicott published an article about the Parker–Hulme murder case, called "Paranoia of the Exalted Type in a Setting of Folie a Deux – A Study of Two Adolescent Homicides," arguing that the intense relationship and shared fantasy world of the two teenaged friends reinforced and exacerbated the mental illness that led to the murder: "each acted on the other as a resonator, increasing the pitch of their narcissism."
- Psychologists H. O'Connell and P. G. Doyle believe folie à plusieurs to have been at least a partial factor in the murder of Bridget Cleary. In 1895, Michael Cleary convinced several friends and relatives that his wife, Bridget Cleary, was a changeling who had been replaced by a fairy. They assisted him in physically abusing her to "cast the fairies" out, before he ultimately burned her to death shortly afterwards.
- Christine and Léa Papin were two French sisters who, as live-in maids, were convicted of murdering their employer's wife and daughter in Le Mans, France, on 2 February 1933.
- Born in Yemen in 1963 to Barbados immigrants, June and Jennifer Gibbons were known as "the Silent Twins" for speaking solely to each other in an idioglossia derived from an idiosyncratic, sped-up Bajan Creole dialect that qualified as an example of cryptophasia. The inseparable twins had a longstanding agreement that, if one died, the other must begin to speak and live a normal life, and it was during their 11-year admission to Broadmoor Hospital — where the twins had been indefinitely placed following a series of crimes (e.g. vandalism, petty theft and arson) in 1981 — that they began to believe that it was necessary for one of them to die. Jennifer agreed it should be her, and when the twins were transferred from Broadmoor to the more open Caswell Clinic in Bridgend, Wales in 1993, Jennifer could not be roused upon arrival. She was taken to the hospital where she died soon after of acute myocarditis, or inflammation of the heart. As no drugs or poison were found in her system, her death remains a mystery. Fulfilling their pact, June proceeded to live an otherwise normal life.
- The Burari Deaths, wherein a family of 11 members was found hanging in their home in Delhi, was ruled as a case of "shared psychosis", led by the youngest son of the matriarch.
- In July 2015, in the case of siblings Robert and Michael Bever, the pair murdered their family due to a shared fantasy of going on a mass shooting spree. According to Michael, they hoped to kill 50 people.
- In 2007, nine members of the Aadom family committed suicide in a small town of Bangladesh by walking in front of a moving train. The Aadoms believed in an anti-Islamic faith, the Aadom religion, founded by the father, Anwar Darbesh, who had died seven years prior.
- In 2014, 12 year old girls Anissa Weier and Morgan Geyser stabbed their friend Payton Leutner 19 times in an attempt to please the online horror character Slenderman. Weier's legal defence characterized the case as folie à deux.

=== In popular culture ===
The disorder has been depicted frequently in popular culture, namely in films, series, books and music, such as:

- Serbian poet Sima Pandurovic wrote a love poem "Svetkovina (Festivity)" in 1908 using the folie a deux metaphor.
- In the psychological thriller anime Perfect Blue, the protagonist experiences psychosis after leaving the J-pop industry to pursue a career in acting. She hallucinates her former popstar self, who repeatedly tells her that she is an imposter. She eventually learns that she is sharing the same delusion with the film's two main antagonists, fueling their motives for trying to harm her.
- In the "Folie à Deux" episode of The X-Files, Fox Mulder is taken hostage by an employee who believes his boss is turning his coworkers into zombies.
- In season 4, episode 3 of Six Feet Under (2004), George mentions folie à deux to Ruth.
- Bug (2006) is a film that depicts a couple with a shared delusion that aphids are living under their skin.
- In season 2, episode 3 of Criminal Minds, "The Perfect Storm" (2006), Dr. Reid mentions that the rapists had this condition. The condition is mentioned again in season 13, episode 21, "Mixed Signals" (2018), about a murderer receiving the delusion from his deceased wife.
- Like Minds (2006) portrays folie à deux through the obsessive and manipulative relationship between two teenage boys, Alex and Nigel. As Nigel imposes his delusional beliefs about religion, ritual, death, and destiny, Alex gradually adopts his worldview, blurring the line between influence and shared madness. The film presents their psychological bond as a closed system, where reality is rewritten through isolation, control, and emotional dependency. The film also reflects Gestalt psychology, showing how the mind seeks patterns and meaning even in violence when individuals become part of a closed psychological system.
- Folie à Deux (2008) is the name of an album by American rock band Fall Out Boy.
- In season 8, episode 7 of Law & Order: Criminal Intent, "Folie à Deux" (2009), a couple report their child as abducted, but no one has seen her.
- Folie à Deux is the name of a song on the album Pray for Haiti (2021) by rapper and producer Mach-Hommy.
- The independent film Apart (2011) depicts two lovers affected and diagnosed with induced delusional disorder, trying to uncover a mysterious and tragic past they share. In a 2011 interview, director Aaron Rottinghaus stated the film was based on research from actual case studies.
- In the third and fourth episodes of the Second series of Luther, the main antagonist are two twin brothers who suffer from shared psychosis.
- Nine Perfect Strangers shows a couple who lost one of their two children. The couple and the surviving child have shared hallucinations of the dead child.
- Any Porth in a Storm: The Long-Distance Walk that Goes South (2021), a travelogue by Oscar Burton, has a chapter with the title 'Folie à deux', referencing meeting another person dressed identically and with the same equipment who was also walking the 1000 km South West Coast Path in England. It is suggestive of the mental decay of the protagonist which becomes evident later in the story.
- The film The Vanished portrays a couple, suffering from folie à deux, that have hallucinations that their dead daughter is still alive.
- The concept of folie à deux is referenced in the third episode of Season 1 "Potage" of the NBC series Hannibal (2013–2015). It is described as "madness shared by two" by Dr. Alana Bloom.
- Perpetrators of an armed siege are described as experiencing folie à deux in the special episode The Siege of the Channel 4 series 24 Hours in Police Custody (2023).
- The DC Comics film Joker: Folie à Deux (2024), a sequel to Joker (2019), shares its subtitle with the disorder.

== See also ==
- Bicameral mentality – Hypothesis in psychology
- Codependency – Type of relationship
- Delusional disorder – Mental disorder featuring beliefs with inadequate grounding
- Emotional contagion – Spontaneous spread of emotions among a group
- Hysterical contagion – Psychological phenomenon
- Jocasta complex – Type of sexual desire in psychoanalytic theory
- Major depressive disorder – Mood disorder
- Mass psychogenic illness – Spread of illness without organic cause
- AI psychosis – Psychological phenomenon
