= Gaanth Chapter 1: Jamnaa Paar =

2024 Indian web series

- Created by: Soham Bhattacharya
- Based on: Burari deaths
- Written by: Soham Bhattacharya, Fahim Irshad, and Anagh Mukherjee
- Directed by: Kanishk Varma
- Starring: Manav Vij, Monika Panwar, Saloni Batra and Rajesh Tailang
- No. of seasons: 1
- No. of episodes: 8

Production
- Executive producers: Anjali Bhushan, Manish Trehan, and Ganesh Shetty.
- Producer: Ajit Andhare
- Cinematography: Pratik Deora
- Production companies: Tipping Point and Click on RM Production

Original release
- Network: JioCinema
- Release: 11 June 2024

Gaanth Chapter 1: Jamnaa Paar is an Indian crime web series directed by Kanishk Varma. It stars Manav Vij, Monika Panwar, Saloni Batra and Rajesh Tailang. It was released to JioCinema on 11 June 2024. It is based of the Burari deaths.

== Premise ==
A suspended, alcoholic, and hot-headed police inspector is brought back to take charge of a case that could be mass suicide due to mental disorder or ritual or homicide. Determined to find the truth, he is aided by a gifted and troubled psychiatric intern.

== Cast ==
=== Main Cast ===
- Manav Vij as Gadar Singh
- Monika Panwar as Sakshi Murmu
- Saloni Batra as Satyawati Mittal

=== Supporting Cast ===
- Manwendra Tripathy
- Gaurav Mishra as Shakeel
- Praveendra Kumar as News Reporter
- Anshul Shukla Ansh as Shekhar Maheshwari
- Richa Anand Mohan as Lawyer
- Arvind Pawar as Styadarshan boy
- Prakhar Saxena as Jamil
- Rajendra Bhatia as Gurkeerat Singh
- Lavishka Gupta as Mini
- Aasokaa as Babua

== Reception ==
Deepa Gahlot for Rediff.com called the series "boring".

Shubhra Gupta of The Indian Express gave 2.5 stars and stated "A word of appreciation for Vij, who does a good job of being a middling cop, with no pretensions of being anything other than who he is."

Dhaval Roy of The Times of India gave 3.5 stars and stated "One of the show's most intriguing aspects is its unique blend of crime, psychology, and even gothic elements."
