= Sarfaroshi Ki Tamanna =

Urdu language poem

- Country: India
- Language: Urdu
- Subject: Dedicated to the freedom fighters of India
- Genre: Ghazal
- Publisher: Sabah (Urdu journal from Delhi)
- Publication date: 1922
- Lines: 22 (11 couplets)

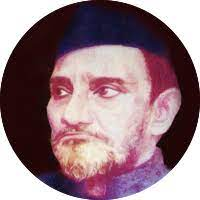
Bismil Azimbadi

Sarfaroshi Ki Tamanna (English: "the desire for sacrifice") is an Urdu patriotic poem written by Bismil Azimabadi as a dedication to young freedom fighters of the Indian independence movement. This poem was popularized by Ram Prasad Bismil. When Ram Prasad Bismil was put on the gallows, the opening lines of this poem were on his lips.

== Composition & publication ==
In 1921 Bismil wrote this poem, following the Jallianwala Bagh massacre and other atrocities by the British colonialists. It was first published in journal "Sabah", published from Delhi. The ghazal has 11 couplets. Khuda Bakhsh Library has preserved the original copy and page of his diary containing this poem written by him and the corrections done by his mentor Shad Azimabadi.

== War-cry of independence movement ==
The poem was immortalised by Ram Prasad Bismil, an Indian freedom fighter, as a war cry during the British Raj period in India. It has also been associated with the younger generation of inter-war freedom fighters such as Ashfaqullah Khan, Bhagat Singh and Chandrashekhar Azad.

== The Song ==
=== Transliteration ===
Sarfaroshi ki tamanna ab hamaare dil mein hai
Dekhna hai zor kitna baazu-e-qaatil mein hai

Karta nahin kyun doosra kuch baat-cheet
Dekhta hun main jise woh chup teri mehfil mein hai
Aye shaheed-e-mulk-o-millat main tere oopar nisaar
Ab teri himmat ka charcha ghair ki mehfil mein hai
Sarfaroshi ki tamanna ab hamaare dil mein hai

Waqt aanay dey bata denge tujhe aye aasman
Hum abhi se kya batayen kya hamare dil mein hai
Khainch kar layee hai sab ko qatl hone ki ummeed
Aashiqon ka aaj jumghat koocha-e-qaatil mein hai
Sarfaroshi ki tamanna ab hamaare dil mein hai

Hai liye hathiyaar dushman taak mein baitha udhar
Aur hum taiyyaar hain seena liye apna idhar
Khoon se khelenge holi gar vatan muskhil mein hai
Sarfaroshi ki tamanna ab hamaare dil mein hai

Haath jin mein ho junoon katt te nahi talvaar se
Sar jo uth jaate hain voh jhukte nahi lalkaar se
Aur bhadkega jo shola-sa humaare dil mein hai
Sarfaroshi ki tamanna ab hamaare dil mein hai

Hum to ghar se nikle hi the baandhkar sar pe kafan
Jaan hatheli par liye lo barh chale hain ye qadam
Zindagi to apni mehmaan maut ki mehfil mein hai
Sarfaroshi ki tamanna ab hamaare dil mein hai

Yuun khadaa maqtal mein qaatil kah rahaa hai baar baar
Kya tamannaa-e-shahaadat bhi kisee ke dil mein hai
Dil mein tuufaanon ki toli aur nason mein inqilaab
Hosh dushman ke udaa denge humein roko na aaj
Duur reh paaye jo humse dam kahaan manzil mein hai
Sarfaroshi ki tamanna ab hamaare dil mein hai

Wo jism bhi kya jism hai jismein na ho khoon-e-junoon
Kya lade toofaanon se jo kashti-e-saahil mein hai

Sarfaroshi ki tamanna ab hamaare dil mein hai.
Dekhna hai zor kitna baazu-e-qaatil mein hai.

=== English translation ===
The desire to get beheaded is now in our hearts
Let us see what strength the killer's arms have got

O nation, why no one else says anything?
Everyone I see in this party has their lips sealed…
O martyr of country, of nation, I bow to thee
As even the enemy now speaks of thy courage
The desire for head-sacrifice is in our hearts…

We shall show thee when the time comes, O heaven
For why should we speak now of what lurks in our hearts?
The hope of blood and sacrifice, binds us all and brings us here
The streets of the enemy now overflows with the lovers of the nation
The desire for head-sacrifice is in our hearts…

Armed does the enemy sit, waiting to open fire
And ready we are, to take it head-on
Play with blood we shall, if the nation is in trouble
The desire for head-sacrifice is in our hearts…

No sword can sever the hands that have the passion within
No threat can bow heads that have risen once for all…
It will but rise, the flame that has lit in our hearts,
and the desire for head-sacrifice is in our hearts…

Set we out from our homes, our heads shrouded with cloth,
Taking our lives in our hands, do we march so…
In our assembly of death, life is now but a guest
The desire for head-sacrifice is in our hearts…

Stands the enemy in the gallows thus, asking,
Does anyone have the desire for martyrdom in their hearts?
With a host of storms in our heart, and with revolution in our breath,
We shall knock the enemy cold, and no one shall stop us…
Dare the destination stay away from us any longer?!
The desire for head-sacrifice is in our hearts…

What is that body that does not have hot blood in it,
How can a person conquer a Typhoon while sitting in a boat moored at the shore?!

The desire for head-sacrifice is in our hearts,
We shall now see what strength the killer's arms have (got left).

== Recent use ==
The first line of the poem was recited by Dr. Manmohan Singh in his Budget Speech of 1992, on the floor of Lok Sabha. The poem has been recently being in use by various mass movements, like the anti-CAA protests in India, Pakistani Students Solidarity March, etc.

== Popular culture ==
The poem was used in Manoj Kumar's Shaheed (1965) on the life of Bhagat Singh. It was again used (with altered lines) as the lyrics for songs two films: in the title song of the 1999 film Sarfarosh (Zindagi Maut Na Ban Jaye), and in the 2002 Hindi film, The Legend of Bhagat Singh. The poem has also been used in the 2000 film, Dhadkan and the 2006 film, Rang De Basanti, being featured heavily for the track Lalkaar in the latter. The poem is also referenced in abridged form in the 2009 movie, Gulaal by Anurag Kashyap. The poem has also been recently used in Ajay Devgn's 2021 film Bhuj: The Pride of India.

== See also ==
- Kakori conspiracy
