= House of Secrets: The Burari Deaths =

2021 docuseries

- The cover of the docuseries, depicting Lalit Chundawat, the perpetrator of the Burari mass-suicide
- Genre: True crime docuseries
- Created by: Leena Yadav; Anubhav Chopra
- Based on: 2018 Burari mass suicide
- Directed by: Leena Yadav; Anubhav Chopra
- Composers: A.R. Rahman; Qutub-E-Kripa
- Country of origin: India
- Original languages: Hindi; English; Punjabi
- No. of episodes: 3

Production
- Executive producers: Aseem Bajaj; James Haygood
- Producers: Yogendra Mogre; Katherine LeBlond
- Production locations: Burari, Delhi; Tohana, Haryana

Original release
- Network: Netflix
- Release: October 8, 2021

House of Secrets: The Burari Deaths is a 2021 docuseries by Netflix. Created by Leena Yadav and Anubhav Chopra, the three-part series explores the theories surrounding the demise of 11 members of the same family on 1 July 2018. Termed as the Burari deaths by the media, the true-crime docuseries released on 8 October 2021. The series is directed by Leena Yadav and Anubhav Chopra. A. R. Rahman and his ensemble of musician group, Qutub-E-Kripa, composed and produced the score of the docuseries, dialogues by Tyson Newton Fernandez. Yogendra Mogre and Katherine Leblond are the producers while Aseem Bajaj and James Haygood are the executive producers.

== Cast ==
- Anita Anand, Clinical Hypnotherapist
- Hemani Bhandari, Reporter, The Hindu
- Barkha Dutt, Journalist
- Manoj Kumar, SHO (2016-2019) of Burari Police Station
- Naresh Bhatia, Sub-inspector (2017-2020) of Burari Police Station
- Mukesh Sengar, Senior Special Correspondent, NDTV
- Brajesh Kumar, SSA (Biology) Forensic science laboratory, New Delhi.

== Production ==
Leena Yadav had plans of making a non-fictional work after the release of Parched (2015) and Rajma Chawal (2018). She revealed in an interview her plans to create a documentary about the Burari mass suicide, an incident revolving around the demise of 11 members of the same family on 1 July 2018, for the creative team working at Netflix India. She felt that there were many stories surrounding the incident that people were unaware of; after she posted the incident, many media channels covered the topic and it became a national sensation, but was stopped at one particular point. The truth regarding the incident and its root cause prompted Yadav to film a documentary about this topic.

"It was different as I come from a narrative background. It was interesting to give up all control. I went into an interview not knowing what I will learn and where it will turn. I had to surrender to it, as the emotional content was so strong. We don't know what happened to the case and that is where the documentary will take you. More than a ‘whodunit’ it is a ‘whydunit' and even though the first question is who, why is much more important in this case."

Yadav began conceptualising the series with Anubhav Chopra, who worked as an assistant director in prominent Bollywood films. She came up with multiple conversations revolving around the people who witnessed the incident and police officers and journalists. The team also came in connection with the brother of one of the victims, saying that "it was very therapeutic because they had not even spoken about the issues amongst themselves". She had covered a total of 400 hours which was considered to be "difficult" and "emotionally draining" but said that it was a "big learning experience".

She added that "our structure was to present it exactly the way we experienced it. To start with, it was a spectacle that blew up. Then the layers came in, and that is exactly the approach: seeing this as an event and then getting into each layer of revelations." For working on the series, she had approached non-professionals to work on the camera. Kshitij Kumar Goel and Laxman Suthar, handled the aerial footages. Yadav said that "the camera has an interesting power, where people who have never been in front of a camera feel pushed to go to the truth. It’s like something is recording you so you better tell the truth now." She approached prominent composer A. R. Rahman to work on the background music. Rahman said that "the series required a distinct, nuanced musical approach: enigmatic yet gripping". The score was curated by Rahman and his Qutub-E-Kripa musical team.

Unlike other documentaries which had a "cinematic approach in the coverage of real incidents", Yadav wanted the documentary to be gripping, and must have "a perspective among various people who witnessed the crime angle". Eventually, the inclusion of voice-over in the documentary made it to be "thrilling and effective". The three-part series highlighted the secretive nature of Indian families, where many families are seemingly, ‘normal’ and ‘well-functioning’ on the surface, but are plagued by issues of all kinds.

== Release ==
Netflix India announced the series in March 2021 as one of 40 Indian original programs (which included films, series, documentary, reality and stand-up comedy shows) slated for premiere that year. On 1 October 2021, the trailer for the docuseries was released in YouTube, and the three-part series released through Netflix on 8 October 2021.

== Reception ==
Anuj Kumar of The Hindu wrote: "What makes the series convincing is the way it captures the inability of the experts in different fields to answer all the questions, and how the case impacted the lives of journalists who covered it, as well as the policemen and forensic experts who investigated it. Whatever they say solves a part of the jigsaw puzzle, but could not complete the picture, because ultimately there is no clear consensus even on whether it was a crime story."

Pooja Biraia Jaiswal of The Week says, "The impact is chilling, thanks to a compelling screenplay. By the end of the series, one is bound to get goose bumps. But the drawback is that there is no sense of finality. Although a line-up of experts dissects Lalit’s psychology and the family’s dynamics, in the end, one is left with more questions than answers."

Ektaa Malik of Indian Express states, "From incorporating the many conspiracy theories, to revealing the actual truth, the docu-series unravels like a work of fiction, backed by a solid screenplay. But its execution is hampered by the short-sightedness of its creators."
