= Shaheed-E-Azam =

2002 Indian film directed by Sukumar Nair

- Directed by: Sukumar Nair
- Written by: Harinder Gill
- Based on: Life of Bhagat Singh
- Produced by: Iqbal Dhilon
- Starring: Sonu Sood; Raj Zutshi; Manav Vij
- Music by: Sabar Ali; Maqbool Khan
- Distributed by: Eros International
- Release date: 31 May 2002
- Country: India
- Language: Hindi

Shaahed-E-Azam is a 2002 Indian Hindi-language biographical drama film directed by Sukumar Nair. The film stars Sonu Sood, Raj Zutshi, Manav Vij, and Dev Gill. It is based on the life of Indian revolutionary Bhagat Singh. In the same year, two other films based on Singh's life were also released, 23rd March 1931: Shaheed and The Legend of Bhagat Singh.

The song, "Tere Ishq Nachaya", written by Bulleh Shah is included in the film's soundtrack.

== Cast ==
- Sonu Sood as Bhagat Singh
- Raj Zutshi as Chandra Shekhar Azad
- Binnu Dhillon
- Manav Vij as Sukhdev Thapar
- Dev Gill as Shivram Hari Rajguru
- Rajendra Gupta
- Abhijeet Lahiri
- Shama Sikander
- Harsharan Singh
- Sadhana Singh

== See also ==
- Shaheed - 1965 Indian film directed by S. Ram Sharma
- 23rd March 1931: Shaheed - 2002 Indian film directed by Guddu Dhanoa
- The Legend of Bhagat Singh - 2002 Indian film directed by Rajkumar Santoshi
