= Manav Vij =

Indian actor

- Born: 2 January 1977 (age 49); Firozpur, Punjab, India
- Occupation: Actor
- Years active: 2002–present
- Spouse: Meher Vij (m. 2009)

Manav Vij is an Indian actor who works in Hindi and Punjabi language films. He debuted with Shaheed-E-Azam (2002) as Sukhdev and also featured in the television series Kyunki Saas Bhi Kabhi Bahu Thi. He went on to appear in Udta Punjab, Rangoon, Phillauri, Naam Shabana and Andhadhun. In 2022, he starred in Samrat Prithviraj and Laal Singh Chaddha.

== Personal life ==
Vij was born in Firozpur, Punjab, India on 2 January 1977. He studied homoeopathy in Ludhiana Medical College and was a practising homoeopathy doctor before entering the acting profession.

He married Meher Vij in 2009 in Mumbai.

== Filmography ==
=== Films ===
Year	Title	Role	Language
2002	Shaheed-E-Azam	Sukhdev	Hindi
2003	Okariki Okaru		Telugu
2004	Asa Nu Maan Watna Da		Punjabi
2004	Des Hoya Pardes		Punjabi
2006	Mannat	Raj	Punjabi
2009	Mini Punjab	Jeet	Punjabi
2009	Apni Boli Apna Des	Sharandeep	Punjabi
2011	Mummy Punjabi	Vikramjit Singh	Hindi
2012	Burrraahh	Kartar	Punjabi
2013	Sikander	Hasan	Punjabi
2014	Dil Vil Pyaar Vyaar	Biba	Punjabi
2014	Punjab 1984	Sukhdev Singh Sarhali	Punjabi
2016	Udta Punjab	Inspector Jhujhar Singh	Hindi
2017	Rangoon	Bhairon Singh	Hindi
2017	Phillauri	Kishanchand	Hindi
2017	Naam Shabana	Ravi	Hindi
2017	Lucknow Central	Tilakdhari	Hindi
2017	Indu Sarkar	Inspector Mann Sodhi	Hindi
2018	Brij Mohan Amar Rahe	Beniwal	Hindi
2018	Race 3	Vijender Singh	Hindi
2018	Khido Khundi	Harry	Punjabi
2018	Andhadhun	Inspector Manohar Jawanda	Hindi
2019	Bharat	Paramjit Singh Bajwa	Hindi
2019	Laal Kaptaan	Rehmat Khan	Hindi
2019	DSP Dev	Rana Brar	Punjabi
2020	Gunjan Saxena: The Kargil Girl	Gautam Sinha	Hindi
2021	Roohi	Guniya Shakeel	Hindi
2022	Samrat Prithviraj	Mohammed Ghori	Hindi
2022	Laal Singh Chaddha	Mohammed Paaji	Hindi
2022	Vadh	Shakti Singh	Hindi
2022	Birha – The Journey Back Home	Inder Singh	Punjabi
2024	Patna Shuklla	Siddharth Shukla	Hindi
2024	Rode College	Janta	Punjabi
2025	Maa Jaye	Billa	Punjabi

=== Television ===
Year	Title	Role	Ref.
2007–2008	Kyunki Saas Bhi Kabhi Bahu Thi	Joydeep Sahil Virani	
2008	Kis Desh Mein Hai Meraa Dil	Kiran	
2009	Mitwa Phool Kamal Ke	Raghav	
2019	Parchhayee	Chandar	
2022–present	Tanaav	Kabir Farooqi	
2024	Gaanth Chapter 1: Jamnaa Paar	Gadar Singh	
