= 2007 Mymensingh mass suicide =

Mass rail suicide in Bangladesh

- 2007 Mymensingh mass suicide (Bangladesh) Site of the suicide
- Location: 24.7672372°N 90.3821343°E; Kashor, Mymensingh, Bangladesh
- Date: 11 July 2007
- Attack type: Mass suicide Rail suicide Ritual suicide (suspected)
- Deaths: 9
- No. of participants: 9

On 11 July 2007, nine members of a family committed mass suicide in the railtrack in Kashor, Mymensingh, Bangladesh. Seven were killed instantly after stepping in front of a moving train near the Kashor rail tracks, while two others died later from their injuries. Later investigations found diaries and symbolic writings in their home, revealing a shared belief in a self-invented cult, named Ādôm Dhôrmô (Bengali: আদম ধর্ম, lit. 'Cult of Adam') centred on their deceased patriarch, who claimed to be the original Adam. The police and psychologists suggested the deaths were motivated by shared psychosis.

== Background ==
Anwar Darbesh, originally a non-commissioned officer in the Pakistan Army, retired from service before the independence of Bangladesh in 1971. He was fluent in Arabic, Urdu, and Persian, and was known for his deep commitment to Islamic practices until the mid-1990s. Locally, he was reputed to possess clairvoyant powers, earning the honorific Darbesh (lit. 'Saint'). People from different districts would seek his blessings or spiritual remedies for illness.

After retirement, Darbesh developed a popular herbal hair oil called Heem Kushum (হিম কুসুম), which he advertised in local cinema halls. It became his family's sole source of income. However, in 1985, authorities banned its sale due to lack of a patent. The family believed the ban was instigated by envious neighbours and relatives. The loss of income marked the beginning of the family's financial decline. With a wife, five daughters, and two sons, Anwar struggled to provide for his household.

During this period, Darbesh immersed himself in comparative religious study, examining Islam, Christianity, and other faiths. He attracted a small group of followers who occasionally lived in his home and contributed small donations to support the family.

In 1993, Darbesh's elder son, Golam Mohiuddin Abdul Kadir, also known as Maehi, moved to Dhaka to continue his education and support the family. Once a practicing Muslim, Maehi stopped saying daily prayers and began to express skepticism about Islamic teachings. According to acquaintances, he would cite the Quranic verse: "Your religion is to you, and my religion is to me."

From 1995 onward, Darbesh began making public anti-Islamic remarks and abandoned daily prayers. His entire family followed suit. Relatives noted his growing hostility to religious ritual and his claim that prayer held no real benefit. That same year, the family began identifying with what Darbesh called the "Adam Cult".

The belief system centered on Darbesh as the original Adam, the creator of the universe. He rejected Islam, Christianity, Hinduism, and Buddhism, declaring all organized religions as false and accusing Muhammad of controlling them all. According to him, their home at Kalindi in Dhaka, was the site where the first human, Adam, had appeared. He claimed that his descendants, his children and grandchildren, were divine extensions of himself. In his writings, he also claimed to be the reincarnation of Aynal Haq of Multan, a Sufi figure executed for claiming to be divine. Darbesh's diary stated that his soul had reincarnated in his grandson Moula.

The cult's doctrine included the view that all religious institutions were illusions and that every human body was itself divine. In one diary entry, Darbesh wrote:

"I am Adam now living a humble life in Mymensingh. We have led a very miserable life and even starved... I have taken my son Maehi and will take other members to me."

The family attempted to bury Darbesh according to his instructions when he died of cardiac arrest at BIRDEM Hospital in Dhaka on 10 July 2000. He had directed that he be buried inside the house, legs facing west contrary to Islamic rites. However, locals, angered by what they saw as heresy, blocked the burial. Maehi claimed the family had converted to Christianity, hoping to justify the burial position. The local church denied any such affiliation. Eventually, police intervened and Darbesh was buried according to Islamic rites at Char Kalibari Graveyard in Mymensingh.

In 2004, Darbesh's son Maehi, who had adopted the name Galen M. Sany and worked as Director of Admissions at East West University in Dhaka, was murdered. Police later discovered forged university certificates in his possession. His death left the family without financial support, further deepening their hardship. He was buried at Char Kalibari Graveyard, reportedly after his brother Arif apologized to the community and reaffirmed the family's Muslim identity. After Maehi's death, Arif moved to Dhaka in search of work, supporting the family by teaching. With no adult male left in the household, the family's vulnerability increased in the years leading up to the mass suicide.

== Incident ==
The incident occurred around BST 15:30 (UTC+6), when a mail train, G-M (Bahadurabad Ghat-Mymensingh) was travelling from Mymensingh Road station toward Mymensingh station. Upon reaching the serene area of Kashor, nine members of Anwar Darbesh's family positioned themselves on the railway tracks and were struck by the oncoming train. Seven were killed instantly. As passengers and locals rushed to the scene, they found two victims, a young boy and a teenage girl, still alive but severely mutilated and crying out for water. Despite efforts to assist them and rush them to the hospital, both died on the way.

Following the accident, hundreds of people gathered near the site, which was located approximately 30 feet from the family's tin-shed home. Witnesses described a grisly scene: body parts were scattered across the railway tracks, with one hand found nearly three kilometres from the site. Human brain tissue and hair were dispersed over the stones along the rail line, prompting widespread panic and fear among onlookers.

The train driver reportedly saw several people walking along the tracks and sounded the whistle to warn them. However, they did not move away. Suddenly, he noticed a group standing in the middle of the line, embracing each other. He was unable to anticipate that they would collectively jump in front of the train. Although he briefly stopped the train, the assistant driver accelerated it again out of fear of public backlash.

The victims were:

- Hena (60), widow of Anwar Darbesh and matriarch of the family
- Akhtari (30), daughter of Hena
- Moon (28), daughter of Hena
- Morsheda (27), daughter of Hena
- Arif (22), son of Hena
- Rahat (20), son of Hena
- Shabnam (10), daughter of Moon
- Mou (10), daughter of Akhtari
- Molla (8), son of Morsheda

== Investigation ==
After the incident, police and local residents entered the family's home for investigation purposes. On the western side of the house, they discovered a grave-like square ditch oriented east to west. Inside a bedroom, investigators recovered five handwritten diaries and an old piece of paper containing a declaration of the "Adam Cult", authored by Anwar Darbesh.

Multiple handwritten suicide notes were discovered, written in Bengali and English, and spanning several months before the event. These notes, some exceeding 100 pages, were penned by various family members including two children aged nine and ten. The writings revealed a cult centered on Darbesh as a divine figure, denouncing all major world religions, especially Islam and portraying Muhammad as an "agent of evil". The notes also contained elements of magical thinking, spiritual possession, and descriptions of trance states used to communicate with the spirits of Darbesh and his murdered son, Maehi.

The notes were marked by recurring themes:

- "Abdul Adam" (Darbesh) as the creator and ultimate truth.
- Denunciation of all religions as false and oppressive.
- Accounts of persecution by Muhammad's "agents", including neighbors and relatives.
- Aspirations for revenge and spiritual reunion with deceased family members.
- Self-identification of each writer as an incarnation or "body" of Darbesh.

According to a diary by Arif, Darbesh's eldest son, the family did not adopt Christianity despite briefly considering it. Christian leaders in Mymensingh confirmed the family had never participated in Christian ceremonies. Police Superintendent Rafiqul Islam noted from the diary that the family rejected all organized religions and had at one point worshipped the Hindu goddess Kali. They sought a "free" life beyond religious doctrines, akin to the innocence they believed Adam and Eve once had, hence their self-identification as the "Adam family".

Arif's diary also revealed that the family initially planned their suicide for 7 July 2007, believing the date held special cosmic significance. They made another attempt on 10 July, the anniversary of Darbesh's death, which they observed as "Black Day". The family prepared for their death by digging a grave-like trench in their yard and readying coffins.

The only surviving member of the family, Meherunnesa Mobi, who was in Brahmanbaria at the time of the incident, rejected her father's religious doctrine and denied that the family had ever converted to Christianity. She also claimed that the deaths were not a suicide but a pre-planned murder, orchestrated by certain neighbors and relatives. Family diaries written in the years after Darbesh's death recounted continued persecution. Murshida, one of his daughters, wrote:

"When my father died and we tried to bury him according to his instruction, the local people did not allow us to do so... People used to throw bombs at us day and night... We got peace when he came back through my body... They called him ghost (jinn) and heretic."

Another diary, possibly written by Darbesh's wife Hena, stated:

"The villagers attacked my children with sticks, knives, cleavers... They threw stones like rain... The villagers have been torturing us for six years... We will soon take revenge."

Leena, a follower who joined the household in 2000, wrote:

"I have been with the family since 2000. I don't want to live in a world where the Aadom family will not be. They are taking me with them, this is my greatest achievement."

== Psychological view ==
Kolkata-based psychologist Nasima Selim, who examined the case, highlighted the possibility of mental illness, suggesting that the family may have experienced a shared psychotic disorder, or folie à deux, a rare condition in which closely related individuals adopt a common delusional belief system.

== In popular culture ==
- Inspired by the incident, director Vicky Zahed created the 20-episode psychological thriller Chokro (lit. 'Cycle'), which premiered on 10 October 2024, on the OTT platform iScreen, starring Tawsif Mahbub and Tasnia Farin.
- The case was also featured in one of the episodes of the true-crime podcast The Desi Crime Podcast, which provides a detailed narration and analysis of the events surrounding it.

== See also ==
- Folie à deux
- Burari deaths, similar incident in India
- Suicide in Bangladesh
- Occult
