= Burari deaths =

2018 mass suicide in Delhi, India

- Location: 28°44′29″N 77°11′53″E; Street 4 Sant Nagar; Burari, Delhi, India
- Date: 1 July 2018
- Attack type: Mass Suicide, Strangulation
- Deaths: 11
- Perpetrator: Mostly Lalit
- No. of participants: 11

The Burari deaths were a ritual mass suicide of eleven family members from Burari, India, in 2018. Ten people—ranging in age from 15 to 57 years old—were found hanged, while the oldest family member, the 80-year-old grandmother, was strangled. The bodies were found on 1 July 2018, in the early morning after the deaths. The police have ruled the deaths were motivated by shared psychosis.

== Background ==
The Chandawat family had lived in the three-story house in Burari's Sant Nagar neighbourhood for around twenty years, after moving from their native town in Tohana, Haryana. The family ran a grocery shop and a plywood business in the area. The family consisted of:

- Narayani Devi (80), mother of Bhuvnesh, Lalit and Pratibha
- Pratibha Bhatia (57), widowed daughter of Narayani Devi
- Bhuvnesh (50, also spelled as Bhavnesh), elder son of Narayani Devi
- Lalit (45), younger son of Narayani Devi
- Savita (48), elder daughter-in-law of Narayani Devi, wife of Bhuvnesh
- Tina (42, also spelled as Teena), younger daughter-in-law of Narayani Devi, wife of Lalit
- Priyanka (33), only daughter of Pratibha
- Nitu (25, also spelled as Neetu), elder daughter of Bhuvnesh
- Monu (called "Menaka") (23), younger daughter of Bhuvnesh
- Dhruv (called "Dushyant") (15), only son and youngest child of Bhuvnesh
- Shivam (15), son of Lalit.
- Vivek (8), second son of Lalit

In 2007, Lalit's father Bhopal Singh died of natural causes. After the death of their father, Lalit became very introverted. One day, he told his family that he was possessed by his father's soul, who advised him the ways to attain a good life. Since 2007, he along with Priyanka and Nitu had been maintaining a diary on his father's "instructions".

== Discovery of bodies ==
On the morning of 1 July 2018 (at around 7:15 am), the neighbour Gurcharan Singh, who used to go on morning walks with one of the deceased, went to the residence. He noticed that Lalit was absent from the morning walk and that the shops were still closed. The shops usually opened between 5 and 5:30 am. Gurcharan Singh found the door of the house open and the ten people, including Lalit, hanging. He raised an alert by calling other neighbours. Police received the call around 7:30 am.

== Suicides ==
Ten of the eleven people – two men, six women and two teens – were found hanging in the courtyard of the house. They were blindfolded and their mouths were taped. Some of the bodies had their hands and feet tied. The grandmother, 80-year-old Narayani Devi, was found dead in another room. It appeared that she had been strangled.

Members of the family were found hanging from a mesh in their ceiling in the hallway, all close together. Their faces were wrapped almost entirely, ears plugged with cotton, mouths taped and hands tied behind the back. There were five stools, probably shared by the 10 members. Their faces were covered with cloth pieces cut from a single bed-sheet.

Jacky, the pet dog of the family, was the only survivor in the house. He was chained on the terrace and had a high fever when the police found him after discovering the 11 bodies. It was not clear who tied him. He was later said to have been recovering at Noida's House of Stray Animals, where he was taken immediately after being rescued.

== Investigation ==
Evidence found in the house pointed to mass suicide for occult reasons. Post-mortem examination of the bodies found no signs of struggle. Due to the public nature of the case, pressure from hardline groups, and accusations of coverup from relatives, police initially recorded the case as a murder and investigated the possibility of a murder motivated by non-occult reasons.

Police found 11 diaries in the house, all of them were maintained for eleven years. Joint Commissioner of Police (Crime) Alok Kumar stated: "We have found handwritten notes detailing how hands and legs were tied and are quite similar to the manner in which the bodies of 10 persons are found. They are exhaustive notes and we are studying them."

Details written in the diaries match how the bodies were found, with their faces covered, mouths taped, and cotton balls in ears. The bodies were discovered hanged in batches of three, which is what the diaries also state. The diary stated that the Bebe (elderly woman) could not stand and hence should be lying on the bed, which was consistent with the discovery of her being found strangled on the bed. The diary also mentions: "everyone will tie their own hands and when the kriya (ritual) is done then everyone will help each other untie their hands", indicating that the family was not expecting to die.

== Role of Lalit Bhatia ==
Handwriting analysis revealed that these diaries were written by Priyanka (the daughter of Pratibha) and Nitu (the elder daughter of Bhuvnesh), but were supposedly believed by them to be dictated to Lalit by his late father's spirit. Lalit is believed to have masterminded the incident. The crime branch believes that Lalit alone was responsible for tying the hands and legs of the family members. Lalit had told the family members that the soul of his father had entered his body in order to get the family to follow him.

== Psychological view ==
According to psychologists, this sequence of events can be caused by 'shared psychotic disorder', where members blindly follow the instructions of one among them. They propose that Lalit had a 'Delusional disorder’. However, their elder brother who stays in Rajasthan, believes that this was a well planned murder and not a suicide. He stated that if this whole event was done by Lalit and his wife, then their hands should be open instead of tied.

== In popular culture ==
- The 845th episode of the Indian crime television show called Crime Patrol is based on the Burari deaths.
- Three-part true crime docu-series titled House of Secrets: The Burari Deaths is based on the case. Created by Leena Yadav and Anubhav Chopra, the series premiered on Netflix on 8 October 2021.
- Disney+ Hotstar has released a series titled Aakhri Sach starring Tamannaah Bhatia and Abhishek Banerjee which is loosely based on this incident.
- The Great Indian Suicide was released on 6 October 2023 on Aha based on the Burari death incident.
- Gaanth Chapter 1: Jamnaa Paar, a JioCinema web-series released on Jun 11, 2024 is based on this incident.

== See also ==
- Folie à deux
- 2007 Mymensingh mass suicide, similar incident in Bangladesh
