= Bismil Azimabadi =

Indian freedom fighter (1901–1978)

- بسمل عظیم آبادی
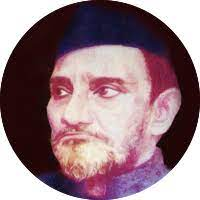
- Born: Syed Shah Mohammad Hasan; 1901; Patna, Bengal Presidency, British India
- Died: 20 June 1978 (aged 76–77); Patna, Bihar, India
- Resting place: Village Kurtha, Bihar
- Occupations: Freedom fighter; Landlord; Poet
- Children: 8
- Writing career
- Pen name: Bismil
- Language: Urdu, Arabic, Persian, English
- Genres: Ghazal, Nazm
- Notable work: Sarfaroshi Ki Tamanna
- Literary movement: Indian independence movement

Bismil Azimabadi (1901 – 20 June 1978) was an Indian freedom fighter, landlord, and an Urdu poet from Patna, the capital of Bihar.

== Family ==
Bismil Azimabadi's real name was Syed Shah Mohammad Hasan, he was born in 1901 at Azimabad (Mughal name of Patna) in Bihar. He belonged to a family of zamindars and they initially resided at Nawada but later settled in Patna. Syed Shah Aale Hasan a barrister was his father, he died at an early age of Bismil. His grandfather, Mubarak Azimabadi was an Urdu language poet and writer. His maternal Grandfather Shah Mubarak Kakvi Azimabadi and his maternal uncle, Khan Bahadur Syed Shah Afzal khan alias Shah Kamal both were poets and were disciple of famous poet of Allahabad named Khan Allahabadi. Bismil died on 20 June 1978 in Azimabad, Patna and was buried at village Kurtha, Bihar, and was survived by five sons and three daughters.

== Involvement in independence movement ==
Bismil developed the nationalist views and took part in freedom movement, he attended the Calcutta Congress Session in 1920 where he recited his poem Sarfaroshi.

== As poet ==
His maternal Grandfather and his maternal Uncle both were poets. He grew in Azimabad where the atmosphere was poetic and literary and it was from there he picked up the love for Urdu poetry. He chose the word Bismil (meaning hurt or wounded) as his pen name and became disciple of Khan Bahadur Shad Azimabadi, (1846–1929). He used to frequent Qutub-khana Anjuman Taraqqi Urdu Library, Patna. He is counted amongst notable poets of Patna.

== Works ==
Most of his work was lost and the remaining was compiled and published by the name of Hikayat-i-Hasti in 1980 with the help of Khuda Bakhsh Oriental Library. His works are listed in the catalogues of various institutions, like, University of Chicago Library, Delhi Public Library, Delhi University Central Library System, etc. His works have been quoted in magazines & journals like, The London Magazine.

=== Ghazals ===
Bismil have written many ghazals, Sarfaroshi Ki Tamanna being the most celebrated of them all.

==== Sarfaroshi Ki Tamanna ====
In 1921 he wrote the patriotic poem Sarfaroshi Ki Tamanna, following the Jallianwala Bagh massacre and other atrocities by the British colonialists. The poem was immortalised by Ram Prasad Bismil, an Indian freedom fighter, as a war cry during the British Raj period in India. It was first published in journal "Sabah", published from Delhi. The ghazal have 11 couplets. Khuda Bakhsh Library has preserved the original copy and page of his diary containing this poem written by him and the corrections done by his mentor Shad Azimabadi. The famous poem been used in many films like, Shaheed (1965), Sarfarosh (1999), The Legend of Bhagat Singh (2002), Rang de Basanti (2006) and Gulaal (2009).

==== Other ghazals ====
Few other ghazals are,

- na apne zabt ko ruswa karo sata ke mujhe
- tang aa gae hain kya karen is zindagi se hum
- ruKH pe gesu jo bikhar jaenge
- ab dam-ba-KHud hain nabz ki raftar dekh kar

=== Sher ===
Many of his standalone shers too are found.

=== Other books ===
Following are other works/books/collections by Bismil,

- Kalām-i Bismil edited by Muhammad Iqbal
- Chamanistan-e-Bismil with contribution from Muhammad Iqbal
- He wrote a short personal memoir named Yaraan-i-Maikadah in 1976

=== Works about him & his work ===
- Bismil Azimabadi: Shakhsiyat aur Fan by Muhammad Iqbal
- His thoughts are recorded in Guftani Na Guftani, the memoirs of Wamiq Jaunpuri
- Most of his Kalam was lost and the remaining was compiled and published by the name of Hikayat-i-Hasti in 1980

== Recognition ==
Bihar Urdu Academy gives an award in his name, known as the "Bismil Azimabadi Award".

== See also ==
- Kakori conspiracy
