= Shaheed (1965 film) =

Indian patriotic film of 1965 directed by S. Ram Sharma

- Directed by: S. Ram Sharma
- Written by: Batukeshwar Dutt; Din Dayal Sharma (dialogue, screenplay)
- Produced by: Kewal Kashyap
- Starring: Manoj Kumar; Prem Chopra; Anant Marathe
- Cinematography: Ranjod Thakur
- Edited by: B. S. Glaad; Vishnu Kumar Singh
- Music by: Prem Dhawan
- Release date: 1 January 1965
- Country: India
- Language: Hindi

Shaheed (transl. Martyr) is a 1965 patriotic film directed by S. Ram Sharma, produced by Kewal Kashyap and starring Manoj Kumar, Kamini Kaushal and Pran in lead roles. Iftekhar, Nirupa Roy, Prem Chopra, Madan Puri and Anwar Hussain star in supporting roles. It is based on the life of Bhagat Singh. The music was composed by Prem Dhawan, with several songs being penned by freedom fighter Ram Prasad Bismil. Shaheed was the first of Manoj Kumar's series of patriotic films, followed by the likes of Upkar (1967), Purab Aur Paschim (1970), and Kranti (1981).

It was released on 1 January 1965 and became a box-office success. The eleventh highest-grossing film of the year, it was given a verdict of "hit" by Box office India. At the 13th National Film Awards, Shaheed won the award for Best Feature Film in Hindi, the Nargis Dutt Award for Best Feature Film on National Integration and the award for Best Screenplay for B. K. Dutt and Din Dayal Sharma.

The film was screened retrospectively on 15 August 2016 at the Independence Day Film Festival, jointly presented by the Indian Directorate of Film Festivals and Ministry of Defense, commemorating 69th Indian Independence Day.

== Plot ==
It is the year 1911 in British India, Sardar Kishan Singh and his family, including son Bhagat, are distressed when Kishan's brother, Ajit Singh, is arrested for agitating people against the British. He then mysteriously disappears after supposedly escaping from prison and is never heard from again. This makes a strong impression on young Bhagat Singh's mind. When he grows up, he joins the movement for freedom struggle headed by Chandrashekar Azad. In 1928, he sees that Lala Lajpat Rai is lathi-charged by the police for leading a protest march against Simon Commission and later succumbs to his injuries. Bhagat, Chandrashekar Azad, Rajguru, Sukhdev, and Jaigopal decide to avenge this by killing Assistant Superintendent J. P. Saunders. On 17 December, they shot him dead as he was leaving a local police station. After the assassination, Bhagat and others decide to leave Lahore to avoid being arrested by CID or the police. Bhagat changes his appearance to an Anglo-Indian gentleman and evades Lahore along with Azad and Rajguru.

4 months later, Bhagat Singh and comrade Batukeshwar Dutt explode a bomb in the Central Legislative Assembly in Delhi as an act of protest. Together with other freedom fighters, including Bhagat's best friend Sukhdev, they are arrested and prosecuted, then thrown in prison. They are detained in the jail at Lahore, where they are continually persecuted and tortured by the prison guards.

After seeing the maltreatment of Indian prisoners, Bhagat and his fellow freedom fighters announce a hunger strike, during which Jatindranath dies. The government gives in and agrees to change the way prisoners are treated. As the case in the killing of Saunders continues, Bhagat and his comrades give poignant speeches in the court condemning British imperialism. Chandrashekhar Azad and Bhagwati Charan Vohra try to help the freedom fighters escape, but the attempt fails, and Bhagwati dies in the process. Chandrashekhar Azad subsequently kills himself (he vowed to never be captured alive) during his encounter with the British police in Alfred Park.

When the trial ends, Bhagat Singh, Rajguru, and Sukhdev are all given death sentences on 7 October 1930. Fearing public protests, the British secretly send Bhagat Singh and Rajguru to the gallows on 23 March 1931, a day before they are officially supposed to be executed. The men shout: "Long live the Revolution!" just before they are executed.

== Cast ==
- Manoj Kumar as Bhagat Singh
- Prem Chopra as Sukhdev Thapar
- Anant Marathe as Shivaram Rajguru
- Kamini Kaushal as Vidyavati Kaur Sandhu (Bhagat's mother)
- Nirupa Roy as Durga Bhabhi
- Sailesh Kumar as Chail Bihari
- Manmohan as Chandra Shekhar Azad
- Pran as Daku Kehar Singh
- Madan Puri as Major P. D. Chopra (Jailor of Lahore Central Jail)
- Asit Sen as Dhaniram
- Anwar Hussain as Jail Warden Chattar Singh
- Kamal Kapoor as Public Prosecutor Rai Bahadur Suryanarayan – Delhi
- Krishan Dhawan as Sardar Ajit Singh (Bhagat's uncle)
- D. K. Sapru as Sardar Kishan Singh Sandhu (Bhagat's father)
- Indrani Mukherjee as Susheela
- Iftekhar as Public Prosecutor, Lahore
- Raghucharan Nanduri as Jaigopal
- Pt. Jawaharlal Nehru as himself in a speech footage
- Mahatma Gandhi as himself in a speech footage
- Arnav Yadav as Abdul Kalam Azad
- Manit Khanduja as Sadar Patel
- Sudhir as Yashwant (uncredited)

== Production ==
Manoj Kumar revealed in 2017 that it took four years of research to prepare for his role. "I visited newspaper offices and read old books, magazine, papers, anything that I could lay my hands on regarding the freedom fighters. In Madras (now Chennai), I would go to Hindu Library after completing the shooting of my films that were being shot there and read books," he explained. He also met Bhagat Singh's lawyer and many freedom fighters of the time to understand his character better.

While the shooting started in 1963, the film released in 1965.

== Soundtrack ==
Music: Prem Dhawan, Lyricist: Prem Dhawan (except Sarfaroshi ki Tamanna by Bismil Azimabadi)

#	Title	Singer(s)	Raga
1	"Ai Vatan Ai Vatan Hamko Teri Kasam"	Mohammad Rafi	
2	"Sarfaroshi Ki Tamanna"	Mohammad Rafi, Manna Dey and Rajendra Mehta	Darbari Kanada
3	"Jogi, Ham To Lut Gaye Tere Pyaar Men"	Lata Mangeshkar	
4	"O Mera Rang De Basanti Chola"	Mukesh, Mahendra Kapoor and Rajendra Mehta	
5	"Pagadi Sambhal Jatta"	Mohammad Rafi	
6	"Watan Pe Marne Wale Zinda Rahega Tera Naam"	Mahendra Kapoor	

== See also ==
Other films based on Bhagat Singh:

- 23rd March 1931: Shaheed - 2002 Indian film directed by Guddu Dhanoa
- The Legend of Bhagat Singh - 2002 Indian film directed by Rajkumar Santoshi
- Shaheed-E-Azam - 2002 Indian film directed by Sukumar Nair

Other films based on Indian Independence Movement:

- Sardar Udham - 2021 film directed by Shoojit Sircar – based on the life of Udham Singh
