= Tabori =

Tabori or Tábori is a Hungarian surname. Notable people with the surname include:

- George Tabori (1914–2007), Hungarian writer and theatre director
- Kristoffer Tabori (born 1952), American actor and television director
- László Tábori (1931–2018), Hungarian-American athlete
- Lena Tabori, American publisher
- Paul Tabori (1908–1974), Hungarian author and journalist
- Peter Tabori (1940–2023), British architect
- Róbert Tábori (1855–1906), Hungarian author
