= Shad Azimabadi =

Indian poet and writer (1846–1927)

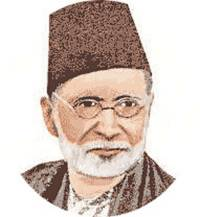
- Born: Syed Ali Mohammad; 8 January 1846; Azimabad (present day Patna, Bihar)
- Died: 7 January 1927 (aged 80); Patna, Bihar
- Other name: Shad
- Title: Khan Bahadur
- Father: Syed Tafazzul Hussain

Shad Azimabadi (8 Jan 1846 – 7 Jan 1927) was an Indian poet and writer from Azimabad, Patna, Bihar.

He studied not only his own faith, Islam, but also Hinduism and Christianity. He excelled in ghazal and marsiya compositions. Urdu scholar, Ali Jawad Zaidi has described him as "a saviour of the ghazal by imparting it with a new mellowness stimulating perception and lyrical realism". Due to his social standing as a laureate, he held several administrative posts in Patna including as an Honorary Magistrate and also as Municipal Commissioner of Patna.

== Life and career ==
Shad Azimabadi was born in 1846 in his maternal grandparent's house. His family was very wealthy and held a respectable position within the high-society of Patna.

Shad Azimabadi showed an interest in poetry from a young age. He was taught Arabic, Persian and Urdu during his school years and received poetic instruction from a number of famous poets of his age including Shah Ulfat Hussain Faryaad who some consider his preceptor. His poetic work was published in five volumes.

Bismil Azimabadi was disciple of Shad Azimabadi.

== Attitudes towards Urdu ==
Azimabadi took a conservative approach towards the Urdu language, which he viewed as only in the purview of the upper classes. His attitude brought him into conflict with the Urdu newspaper, Al Punch, as the newspaper gave space for common people to speak and write in Urdu which went against his view that only ashraf were the rightful speakers of Urdu.

== Bibliography ==
- Irshad, Naqi Ahmad (1967). Shad Azeemabadi: Kalam aur Sharah-e-Kalam (in Urdu). Lucknow: Naseem Book Depot.
- Fatmi, Zeeshan (1996). Shad Azimabadi: Hindustani Adab Ke Memar [Shad Azimabadi: The Maker of Indian Literature] (in Urdu). Delhi: Sahitya Academy.
- Haider, Syed Raza (2011). Shad Azimabadi: Hayat-e-Khidmat [Shad Azimabadi: Life and Works] (in Urdu). New Delhi: Ghalib Institute.
- Azimabadi, Hameed (1937). Shad Azimabadi Ke Sau Sher (in Urdu).
- Shad Azimabadi: Chand Mutale [Shad Azimabadi: Some Researches] (in Urdu). Patna: Khuda Bakhsh Oriental Library. 1996.
- Irshad, Naqi Ahmad (1967). Shad Azimabadi (in Urdu). Lucknow: Naseem Book Depot.
