= The Legend of Bhagat Singh =

2002 Indian film by Rajkumar Santoshi

- Theatrical release poster
- Directed by: Rajkumar Santoshi
- Written by: Rajkumar Santoshi
- Dialogues by: Piyush Mishra (Hindi); Anjum Rajabali (English)
- Produced by: Kumar Taurani; Ramesh Taurani
- Starring: Ajay Devgn; Sushant Singh; Akhilendra Mishra; D. Santosh; Amrita Rao
- Cinematography: K. V. Anand
- Edited by: V. N. Mayekar
- Music by: A. R. Rahman
- Production company: Tips Industries
- Distributed by: Tips Industries
- Release date: 7 June 2002
- Running time: 156 minutes
- Country: India
- Languages: Hindi; English
- Budget: ₹20 crore (Note: While the film's details on Box Office India state that the budget was ₹200 million, Shubhra Gupta of Business Line says that ₹250 million was spent on the film's making.)
- Box office: est. ₹12.9 crore

The Legend of Bhagat Singh is a 2002 Indian biographical drama film directed by Rajkumar Santoshi. The film is based on Bhagat Singh, a revolutionary who fought for Indian independence along with fellow members of the Hindustan Socialist Republican Association. It features Ajay Devgn as the titular character along with Sushant Singh, Akhilendra Mishra and D. Santosh as the other lead characters. Raj Babbar, Farida Jalal and Amrita Rao play supporting roles. The film chronicles Singh's life from his childhood where he witnesses the Jallianwala Bagh massacre until the day he was hanged to death before the official trial dated 24 March 1931.

The film was produced by Kumar and Ramesh Taurani's Tips Industries on a budget of ₹200–250 million (about US$4.2–5.2 million in 2002). (Note: The average exchange rate in 2002 was 48.23 Indian rupees (₹) per 1 US dollar (US$).) The story and dialogue were written by Santoshi and Piyush Mishra respectively, while Anjum Rajabali drafted the screenplay. K. V. Anand, V. N. Mayekar and Nitin Chandrakant Desai were in charge of the cinematography, editing and production design respectively. Principal photography took place in Agra, Manali, Mumbai and Pune from January to May 2002. The soundtrack and film score were composed by A. R. Rahman, with the songs "Mera Rang De Basanti" and "Sarfaroshi Ki Tamanna" being well received in particular.

The song "Mera Rang De Basanti" is set in raga Bhairavi.

The Legend of Bhagat Singh was released on 7 June 2002 to generally positive reviews, with the direction, story, screenplay, technical aspects, and the performances of Devgan and Sushant receiving the most attention. However, the film underperformed at the box office, grossing only ₹129 million (US$2.7 million in 2002). It went on to win two National Film Awards – Best Feature Film in Hindi and Best Actor for Devgn – and three Filmfare Awards from eight nominations.

The film's release coincided with another film based on Bhagat Singh directed by Guddu Dhanoa and titled 23rd March 1931: Shaheed. Both films failed at the box office.

== Plot ==
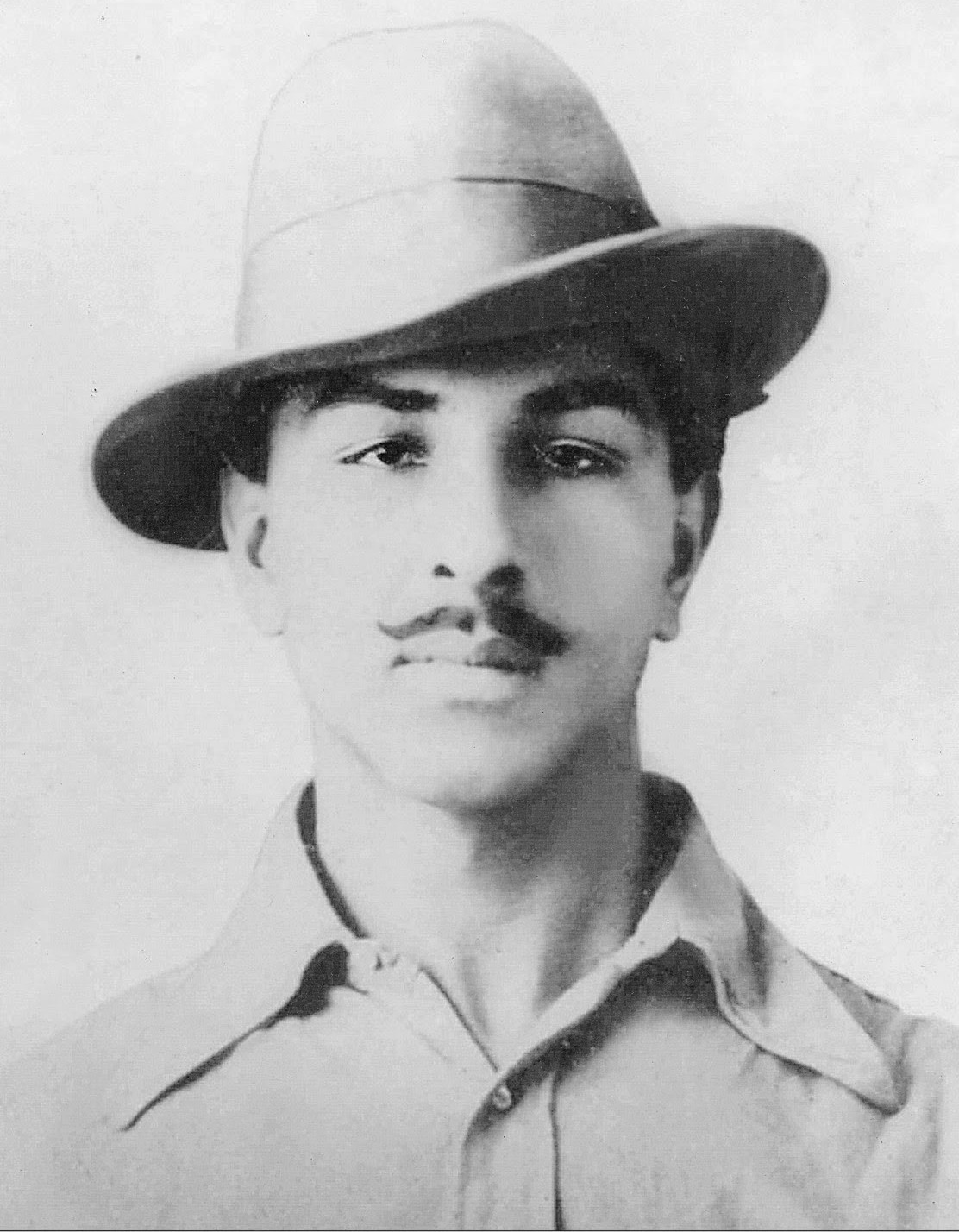
The film is about Bhagat Singh, a socialist revolutionary who fought for Indian independence.

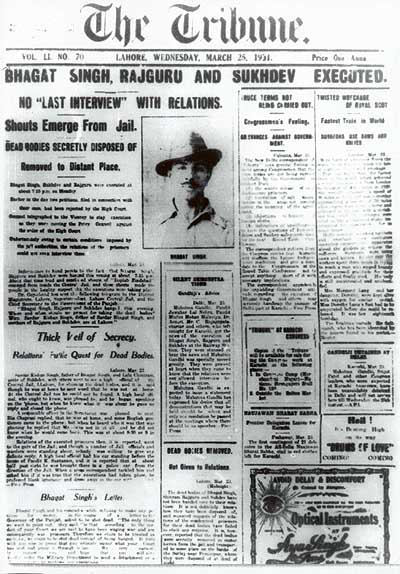
The Tribune (Lahore)'s front page headline on the 25th of March 1931: "BHAGAT SINGH, RAJGURU and SUKHDEV EXECUTED"

In 1907, Bhagat Singh is born in British India. From childhood, he witnesses numerous atrocities committed against Indians by the British colonial regime. Following the horrific aftermath of the Jallianwala Bagh massacre, Bhagat takes a solemn vow to dedicate his life to freeing India from British rule. He initially supports Mahatma Gandhi's Non-Cooperation Movement, but when Gandhi abruptly calls off the campaign in 1922 following the Chauri Chaura incident, a disillusioned Bhagat chooses the path of armed revolution. As an adult, he joins the Hindustan Republican Association (HRA), which leads to his first imprisonment. To steer him toward a peaceful life, his father, Kishen, bails him out, establishes a dairy farm for him, and arranges his marriage with a woman named Mannewali. Rejecting a domestic life, Bhagat flees home, leaving a note stating that his country remains his ultimate love.

In 1928, nationalist leader Lala Lajpat Rai is beaten to death by police while leading a peaceful protest against the Simon Commission. In retaliation, Bhagat, alongside fellow revolutionaries Shivaram Rajguru, Sukhdev Thapar, and Chandra Shekhar Azad, assassinates Assistant Superintendent of Police John Saunders. In 1929, to protest the oppressive Trade Disputes and Public Safety Bills, Bhagat and Batukeshwar Dutt orchestrate a bombing inside the Central Legislative Assembly in New Delhi. They deliberately target empty benches to avoid casualties, using the subsequent public trial as a platform to propagate their revolutionary ideals and counter British propaganda that branded them as mere terrorists. Bhagat's popularity surges nationwide, rivalling Gandhi's influence among the youth, laborers, and farmers.

While incarcerated at Lahore Central Jail, Bhagat, Sukhdev, Rajguru, and their fellow inmates undertake a grueling 63-day hunger strike to demand equal rights and humane conditions for Indian political prisoners, resisting violent forced-feedings and canings by the authorities. Meanwhile, on February 27, 1931, the British police corner Azad at Alfred Park in Allahabad. Following a fierce shootout and refusing to be captured alive, Azad commits suicide with the final bullet in his pistol.

Fearing the revolutionary momentum sweeping the nation, Viceroy Lord Irwin orders the reopening of the Saunders murder case, resulting in death sentences for Bhagat, Sukhdev, and Rajguru. The Indian public hopes Gandhi will leverage the Gandhi-Irwin Pact to secure their release, but Irwin refuses. Gandhi ultimately signs the pact, which explicitly excludes prisoners convicted of violence from amnesty. On March 23, 1931, Bhagat Singh, Sukhdev Thapar, and Shivaram Rajguru are executed by hanging in absolute secrecy.

== Cast ==
- Ajay Devgan as Bhagat Singh
- Sushant Singh as Sukhdev Thapar
- Akhilendra Mishra as Chandra Shekhar Azad
- D. Santosh as Shivaram Rajguru
- Bhaswar Chatterjee as Batukeshwar Dutt
- Raj Babbar as Kishen Singh Sandhu, Bhagat's father
- Farida Jalal as Vidyawati Kaur Sandhu, Bhagat's mother
- Amrita Rao as Mannewali, the girl Bhagat's family wanted him to marry
- Mukesh Tiwari as Khan Bahadur Mohammad Akbar, Deputy jailor at Lahore Central Jail
- Surendra Rajan as Mahatma Gandhi
- Saurabh Dubey as Jawaharlal Nehru
- Swaroop Kumar as Motilal Nehru
- Arun Patwardhan as Madan Mohan Malaviya
- Kenneth Desai as Subhash Chandra Bose
- Sitaram Panchal as Lala Lajpat Rai
- Amit Dhawan as Bhagwati Charan Vora
- Harsh Khurana as Jai Gopal
- Kapil Sharma as Shiv Verma
- Indrani Banerjee as Durgawati Devi a.k.a. "Durga Bhabhi"
- Amitabh Bhattacharjee as Jatindra Nath Das a.k.a. "Jatin Das"
- Shish Khan as Prem Dutt
- Sanjay Sharma as Ajay Ghosh
- Raja Tomar as Mahabir Singh
- Deepak Kumar Bandhu as Ramsaran Das
- Niraj Shah as Gaya Prasad
- Pradeep Bajpai as Pandit Kishori Lal
- Aditya Verma as Des Raj
- Romie Jaspal as Sachindra Nath Sanyal
- Sunil Grover as Jaidev Kapoor
- Abir Goswami as Phanindra Nath Ghosh
- Pramod Pathak as Mahour
- Aashu Mohil as Hans Raj Vohra
- Manu Malik as Agya Ram
- Navin Bhaskar as Kawalnath Tiwari
- Shreyas Pandit as Surendra Nath Pandey
- Rakesh Awan as Markand
- Kiran Randhawa as Police Officer
- Ganesh Yadav as Ram Prasad Bismil
- Tony Mirchandani as Ashfaqulla Khan
- Padam Singh as Roshan Singh
- Ashok Sharma as Rajendra Lahiri
- Mahesh Raja as Sachindranath Bakshi
- Vikky as Mukundilal
- Piyush Chakravorthy as Banwarilal
- Vasudevan as Murari Sharma
- Narendra Rawal as Manmath Nath Gupta
- Shamsher Singh as Arjan Singh
- Oshima Rekhi as Jai Kaur
- Sukhmani Kohli as Amar Kaur
- Ankush as Kulbir Singh
- Karanbir Singh as Kultar Singh
- Renu Soni as Baddi Chachi
- Anita as Choti Chachi
- Gurucharan Channi as Chattar Singh
- Mahajan Prashant as Justice Rai Sahib
- Hayat Asif as Justice Asaf Ali
- Sardar Sohi as Leader at Jallianwala Bagh
- Rajesh Tripathi as Veerbhadra Tiwari
- Lalit Tiwari as Professor Acharya Balakrishna
- Shehzad Khan as Horse-cart driver Khairu
- Gil Alon as Viceroy Lord Irwin
- Ryan Jonathan as Herbert William Emerson, Home Member, His Majesty's Government
- Conrad as Assistant Superintendent of Police John P. Saunders
- Tim as Superintendent of Police James Alexander Scott
- Richard as Colonel Reginald Dyer, who ordered his Gurkhas to open fire on an unarmed gathering of people at Jallianwala Bagh in 1919
- Nakshdeep Singh as young Bhagat

== Production ==
=== Development ===
In 1998, the film director Rajkumar Santoshi read several books on the socialist revolutionary, Bhagat Singh, and felt that a biopic would help revive interest in him. Although S. Ram Sharma made a film about Bhagat in 1965, titled Shaheed, Santoshi felt that despite being "a great source of inspiration on the lyrics and music front", it did not "dwell on Bhagat Singh's ideology and vision". In August 2000, the screenwriter Anjum Rajabali mentioned to Santoshi about his work on Har Dayal, whose revolutionary activities inspired Udham Singh (on whom a Punjabi film too had been released earlier that year). (Note: Udham Singh was a revolutionary responsible for the assassination of Michael O'Dwyer, the former lieutenant governor of Punjab as a response to the Jallianwala Bagh massacre in 1919.) Santoshi then persuaded Rajabali to draft a script based on Bhagat's life as he was inspired by Udham Singh.

Santoshi gave Rajabali a copy of Shaheed Bhagat Singh, Kuldeep Khullar's biography of the revolutionary. Rajabali said that reading the book "created an intense curiosity in me about the mind of this man. I definitely wanted to know more about him." His interest in Bhagat intensified after he read The Martyr: Bhagat Singh's Experiments in Revolution (2000) by journalist Kuldip Nayar. The following month, Rajabali formally began his research on Bhagat while admitting to Santoshi that it was "a difficult task". Gurpal Singh, a Film and Television Institute of India graduate, and internet blogger Sagar Pandya assisted him. Santoshi received input from Kultar Singh, Bhagat's younger brother, who told the director he would have his full co-operation if the film accurately depicted Bhagat's ideologies.

Rajabali wanted to "recreate the world that Bhagat Singh lived in", and his research required him to "not only understand the man, but also the influences on him, the politics of that era". In an interview with Sharmila Taliculam of Rediff.com in the year 2000, Rajabali said that the film would "deal with Bhagat Singh, the man, rather than the freedom fighter". Many aspects of Bhagat's life, including his relationship with fiancée Mannewali, were derived from Piyush Mishra's 1994 play Gagan Damama Bajyo; Mishra was subsequently credited with writing the film's dialogues.

A. G. Noorani's 1996 book, The Trial of Bhagat Singh: Politics of Justice, provided the basis for the trial sequences. Gurpal obtained additional information from 750 newspaper clippings of The Tribune dated from September 1928 to March 1931, and from Bhagat's prison notebooks. These gave Rajabali "an idea of what had appealed to the man, the literary and intellectual influences that impacted him in that period". By the end of the year 2000, Santoshi and Rajabali completed work on the script and showed it to Kumar and Ramesh Taurani of Tips Industries; both were impressed by it. The Taurani brothers agreed to produce the film under their banner and commence filming after Santoshi had finished his work on Lajja (2001).

=== Casting ===
Sunny Deol was initially cast as Bhagat Singh, but he left the project owing to schedule conflicts and differences with Santoshi. Santoshi then preferred to cast new faces instead of established actors but was not pleased with the performers who auditioned. Aamir Khan was also offered the role, but he declined, saying he wasn't young enough for the part. Ajay Devgn (then known as Ajay Devgan) was finally chosen for the lead character because Santoshi felt he had "the eyes of a revolutionary. His introvert nature conveys loud and clear signals that there is a volcano inside him ready to burst." After Devgn performed a screen test dressed as Bhagat, Santoshi was "pleasantly surprised" to see Devgn's face closely resemble Singh's and cast him in the part. The Legend of Bhagat Singh marked Devgn's second collaboration with Santoshi after Lajja. Devgn called the film "the most challenging assignment" in his career. He had not watched Shaheed before signing up for the project. To prepare for the role, Devgn studied all the references Santoshi and Rajabali had procured to develop the film's script. He also lost weight to more closely resemble Bhagat.

Whatever we have read in school and learnt in history is not even 1% of the kind of person he [Bhagat] was. I don't think he got his due ... When Rajkumar Santoshi narrated the script to me, I was taken aback because this man had done so much and his motive was not just independence of India. He had predicted the challenges that we face in our country today. From riots to corruption, he had predicted that and he wanted to fight that.

— Devgn on his perception of Bhagat

Santoshi chose Akhilendra Mishra to play Azad as he also resembled his character. In addition to reading Shiv Verma's Sansmritiyan, Mishra read Bhagwan Das Mahore's and Sadashiv Rao Malkapurkar's accounts of the revolutionary. Because of his astrological beliefs, he even obtained Azad's horoscope to determine his personality. In an interview with Rediff.com's Lata Khubchandani, Mishra mentioned that while informing his father about his role of Azad, he revealed to him that they originally hailed from Kanpur, the same place where Azad's ancestors were from. This piece of information encouraged Mishra to play Azad.

Sushant Singh and D. Santosh (in his cinematic debut) were cast as Bhagat's friends and fellow members of the Hindustan Republican Association, Sukhdev Thapar and Shivaram Rajguru. Santoshi believed their faces resembled those of the two revolutionaries. To learn about their characters, Sushant, like Mishra, read Sansmritiyan while Santosh visited Rajguru's family members. The actors were also chosen according to their characters' backgrounds. This was true in the case of Santosh and also Amitabh Bhattacharjee, who played Jatin Das, the man who devised the bomb for Bhagat and Batukeshwar Dutt. Santosh and Bhattacharjee were from Maharashtra and West Bengal like Rajguru and Das. Raj Babbar and Farida Jalal were cast as Bhagat's parents, Kishen Singh and Vidyawati Kaur, while Amrita Rao played Mannewali, Bhagat's fiancée.

=== Filming ===
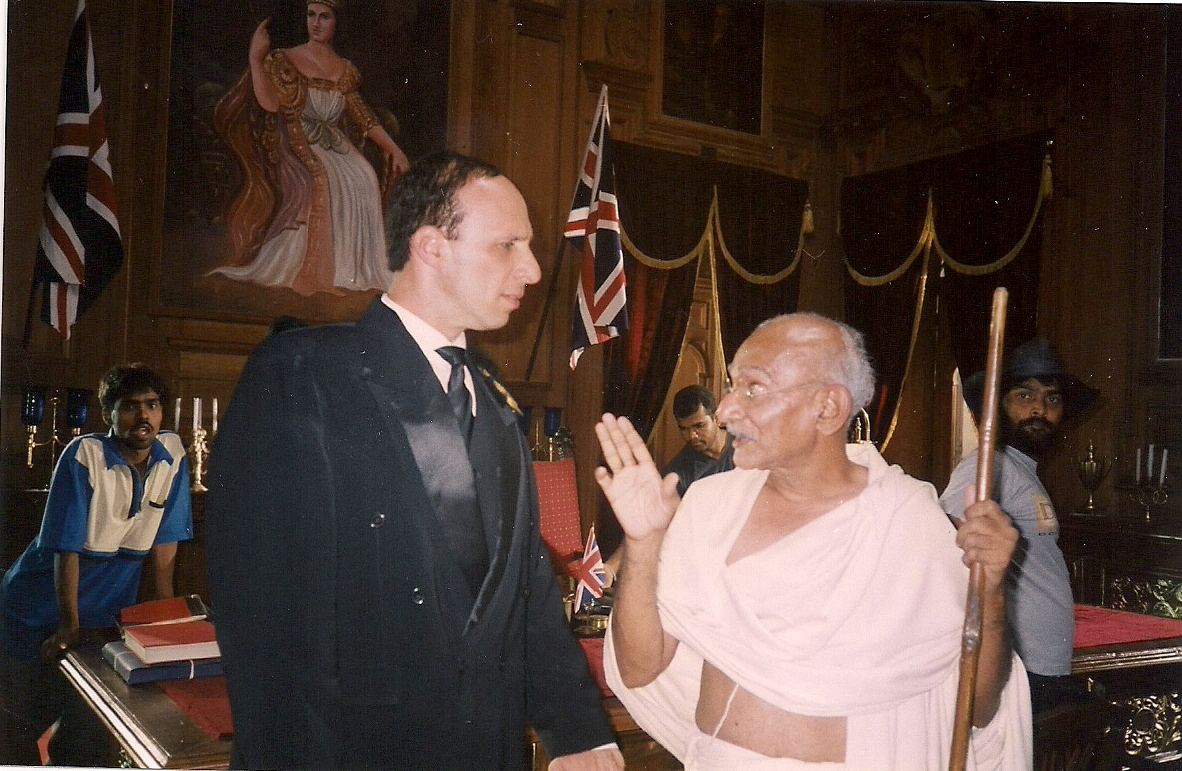
Surendra Rajan (right) portraying Gandhi and Gil Alon (left) as Viceroy Lord Irwin at the film's shooting in the University of Pune.

Principal photography began in January 2002 and was completed in May. The first schedule of filming took place in Agra and Manali following which the unit moved to the Film City studio in Mumbai. According to the film's cinematographer, K. V. Anand, around 85 sets were constructed at Film City by Nitin Chandrakant Desai who was in charge of the production design, and "99 percent of the background" featured in the film was sets. Desai used sepia tint throughout the film to create a period feel.

Additional scenes depicting the massacre of 1919 were filmed at a set constructed to look like the Bagh as it was 83 years ago; some of them were shot between 9 pm and 6 am. The scenes at the Bagh set and other surrounding locations of Amritsar at the beginning of the film feature Nakshdeep Singh as the younger Bhagat. Santoshi selected Nakshdeep after receiving photographs of the boy from his father, Komal Singh, who played Mannewali's father.

Kultar stayed with the production unit for seven days during the outdoor location shooting in Pune. Both Santoshi and Devgn appreciated the interactions they had with Kultar, noting that he provided "deep insights into his brother's life". Kultar was pleased with the sincerity of the cast and crew and shared private letters written by Bhagat with them. The song "Pagdi Sambhal Jatta" was the last part to be filmed. A sequence in the song featuring Devgn appearing between two factions of backup Bhangra dancers took three takes to be completed. The Legend of Bhagat Singh was made on a budget of ₹200 – 250 million (about US$4.15 – 5.18 million in 2002).

== Music ==
A. R. Rahman composed the soundtrack and score for The Legend of Bhagat Singh, marking his second collaboration with Santoshi after Pukar (2000). Sameer wrote the lyrics for the songs. Rahman recalled that Santhoshi had suggested him to compose slow-paced songs, unlike Shaheed which had fast paced compositions and experimented with Punjabi music more than what he done in his previous films. The soundtrack was completed within two months, and was released on 8 May 2002 in New Delhi.

== Release ==
The Legend of Bhagat Singh was released on 7 June 2002 coinciding with the release of Sanjay Gadhvi's romance, Mere Yaar Ki Shaadi Hai, and another film based on Bhagat, 23rd March 1931: Shaheed, which featured Bobby Deol as the revolutionary.

A week before the film's release, Article 51 A Forum, a non-governmental organisation in Delhi, believed The Legend of Bhagat Singh to be historically inaccurate, criticising the inclusion of Mannewali as Bhagat's widow, and stating the films were made "without any research or devotion" and the filmmakers were just looking at the box-office prospects to "make spicy films based on imaginary episodes". Kumar Taurani defended his film saying that he did not add Rao "for ornamental value", noting he would have opted for an established actress instead if that were the case. A press statement issued by Tips Industries said: "This girl from Manawali village loved Bhagat Singh so totally that she remained unmarried till death and was known as Bhagat Singh's widow." The chief operating officer of Tips Industries, Raju Hingorani, pointed out that Kultar had authenticated the film, stating: "With his backing, why must we be afraid of other allegations?"

On 29 May 2002, a 14-page petition was filed by Paramjit Kaur, the daughter of Bhagat's youngest brother, Rajinder Singh, at the Punjab and Haryana High Court to stay the release of both The Legend of Bhagat Singh and 23rd March 1931: Shaheed, alleging that they "contained distorted versions" of the freedom fighter's life. Kaur's lawyer, Sandeep Bhansal, argued that Bhagat singing a duet with Mannewali and wearing garlands were "untrue and amounted to distortion of historical facts". Two days later, the petition came up for hearing before the Judges Justice Jawaharlal Gupta and Justice Narinder Kumar Sud; both refused to stay the films' release, observing that the petition was moved "too late and it would not be proper to stop the screening of the films".

== Reception ==
=== Critical response ===
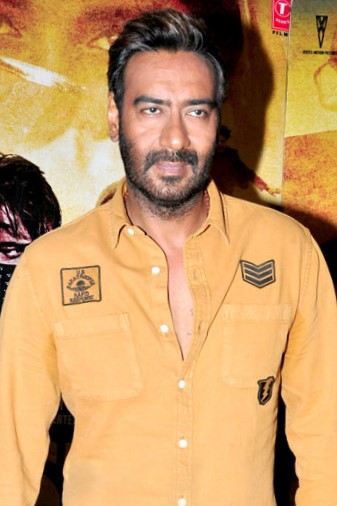
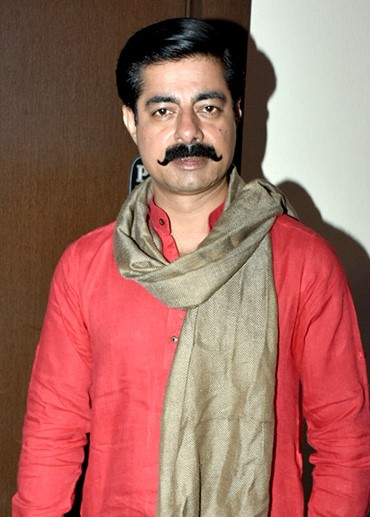
Critics particularly praised the performances of Devgn and Sushant.

The Legend of Bhagat Singh received generally positive critical feedback, with praise for its direction, story, screenplay, cinematography, production design and the performances of Devgn and Sushant. Chitra Mahesh praised Santoshi's direction, noting in her review for The Hindu that he "shows some restraint in handling the narrative". She appreciated the film's technical aspects and Devgn's rendition, calling his interpretation of Bhagat "powerful, without being strident". Writing for The Times of India, Dominic Ferrao commended Devgn, Sushant, Babbar and Mishra, saying that they all come "off with flying colours". A review carried by Sify labelled the film "slick and commendable"; it also termed Devgn's portrayal of Bhagat as "fabulous" but felt he "overrides" the character and that "the supporting characters make more impact than him."

In a comparative analysis of The Legend of Bhagat Singh with 23rd March 1931: Shaheed, Ziya-Us-Salam of The Hindu found the former to be a better film because of the "clearly etched out" supporting characters, while opining Devgn was more "restrained and credible" than Bobby Deol. Salam admired Sushant's performance, opining that he has "a fine screen presence, good timing and an ability to hold his own in front of more celebrated actors". In a more mixed comparison, Rediff.com's Amberish K. Diwanji, despite finding The Legend of Bhagat Singh and Devgn to be the better film and actor like Salam, criticised the "constant shouting and mouthing of dialogues". He responded negatively to the inclusion of Bhagat's fiancée, pointing out the film took liberties in using this "slim" piece of information "just to have a girl sing." Diwanji, however, commended the narrative structure of The Legend of Bhagat Singh, saying that the film captured the revolutionary's life and journey well, thereby making it "worth watching and give[ing] it relevant historical background."

Among overseas reviewers, Dave Kehr of The New York Times complimented the placement of the film's song sequences, especially that of "Sarfaroshi Ki Tamanna" and "Mere Rang De Basanti". Kehr called Devgn's interpretation of Bhagat "glowering" while praising Sushant's "urbane and unpredictable" rendition of Sukhdev. Although Variety's Derek Elley found The Legend of Bhagat Singh to be "drawn with more warmth" and approved of Devgn's and Sushant's performances, he was not pleased with the "choppy" screenplay in the film's first half. He concluded his review by saying that the film "has a stronger lead [thespian] and richer gallery of characters that triumph over often unsubtle direction".

Some of the criticism was also directed towards the treatment of Gandhi. Mahesh notes that he "appears in rather poor light" and was depicted as making "little effort" to secure a pardon for Bhagat, Sukhdev and Rajguru. Diwanji concurs with Mahesh while also saying that the Gandhi–Irwin Pact as seen in the film would make the audience think that Gandhi "condemned the trio to be hanged by inking the agreement" while pointing out the agreement itself "had a different history and context." Kehr believed the film's depiction of Gandhi was its "most interesting aspect". He described Surendra Rajan's version of Gandhi as "a faintly ridiculous poseur, whose policies play directly into the hands of the British" and in that aspect, he was very different from "the serene sage" portrayed by Ben Kingsley in Richard Attenborough's Gandhi (1982). Like Diwanji, Elley also notes how the film denounces Gandhi by blaming him "for not trying very hard" to prevent Bhagat's execution.

=== Box office ===
The Legend of Bhagat Singh had an average opening in its first week, grossing ₹57.1 million (US$1.18 million in 2002) worldwide, with ₹33 million (US$684,221 in 2002) in India alone. The film failed to cover its budget thus underperforming at the box office, collecting only ₹129.35 million (US$2.68 million in 2002) by the end of its theatrical run. Shubhra Gupta of Business Line attributed the film's commercial failure to its release on the same day as 23rd March 1931: Shaheed, opining that "the two Bhagats ate into each other's business". Taurani acknowledged this as a reason for the film's failure, along with the release of another Bhagat Singh film Shaheed-E-Azam the week before.

== Accolades ==
At the 50th National Film Awards, The Legend of Bhagat Singh won the Best Feature Film in Hindi and Devgn received the Best Actor award. The film received three nominations at the 48th Filmfare Awards and won three—Best Background Score (Rahman), Best Film (Critics) (Kumar Taurani, Ramesh Taurani) and Best Actor (Critics) (Devgn).

Award	Date of ceremony (Note: Date is linked to the article about the awards held that year, wherever possible.)	Category	Recipient(s) and nominee(s)	Result	Ref.
Filmfare Awards	21 February 2003	Best Background Score	A. R. Rahman	Won	
Filmfare Awards	21 February 2003	Best Film (Critics)	Kumar Taurani, Ramesh Taurani	Won	
Filmfare Awards	21 February 2003	Best Actor (Critics)	Ajay Devgn	Won	
National Film Awards	29 December 2003	Best Feature Film in Hindi	Rajkumar Santoshi, Kumar Taurani, Ramesh Taurani	Won	
National Film Awards	29 December 2003	Best Actor	Ajay Devgn	Won	

== Legacy ==
Since its release, The Legend of Bhagat Singh has been considered one of Santoshi's best works. Devgan said in December 2014 that The Legend of Bhagat Singh along with Zakhm (1998) were the best films he ever worked on in his career. He also revealed he had not seen such a good script since. In 2016, the film was included in Hindustan Times's list of "Bollywood's Top 5 Biopics". The Legend of Bhagat Singh was added in both the SpotBoyE and The Free Press Journal lists of Bollywood films that can be watched to celebrate India's Independence Day in 2018. The following year, Daily News and Analysis and Zee News also listed it among the films to watch on Republic Day.

== See also ==
Other films based on Bhagat Singh:

- 23rd March 1931: Shaheed - 2002 Indian film directed by Guddu Dhanoa
- Shaheed-E-Azam - 2002 Indian film directed by Sukumar Nair
- Shaheed - 1965 Indian film directed by S. Ram Sharma

Other films based on Indian Independence Movement:

- Sardar Udham - 2021 film directed by Shoojit Sircar – based on the life of Udham Singh

== Film ==
- Tips Official (18 August 2011). The Legend of Bhagat Singh – Movie Making – Ajay Devgan. YouTube (Motion picture) (in Hindi). India. Archived from the original on 28 March 2018.
