= Communist involvement in the Indian independence movement =

Communists were actively involved in Indian independence movement through multiple series of protests, strikes and other activities. It was a part of revolutionary movement for Indian independence. Their main thrust was on organising peasants and working classes across India against the British and Indian capitalists and landlords.

== Communist organizations during independence movement ==
Following the independence movements, many militant underground communist organizations were formed.

=== Hindustan Socialist Republican Association ===
Following the Non-cooperation movement of 1919, Hindustan Republican Association (HRA) was formed by Sachindra Nath Sanyal, Jadugopal Mukherjee and Jogesh Chandra Chatterjee after a meeting in Cawnpore. The HRA had branches in West Bengal, Agra, Allahabad, Benares, Cawnpore, Lucknow, Saharanpur and Shahjahanpur. Afterwards it became Hindustan Socialist Republican Association by influence of Bhagat Singh and decided that the new organization would work in cooperation with the Communist International.

They were also involved in manufacturing bombs in Calcutta – at Dakshineswar and Shovabazar – and at Deoghar in Jharkhand (then Bihar province). Kakori train robbery was the most prominent efforts, where they looted government money from a train around 10 miles (16 km) from Lucknow. Significant members of the HRSA were arrested and tried for their involvement in that incident and others which had preceded it. The outcome was that four leaders – Ashfaqullah Khan, Ram Prasad Bismil, Roshan Singh and Rajendra Lahiri – were hanged in December 1927 and a further 16 imprisoned for lengthy terms. The result of the trial, in which the HRSA participants sang patriotic songs and displayed other forms of defiance, seriously damaged the leadership of the HRSA and dealt a major blow to its activities. Many associated with the HRSA who escaped trial found themselves placed under surveillance or detained for various reasons. Chandra Shekhar Azad was the only one of the principal leaders who managed to escape arrest whereas Banwari Lal became an approver.

HRSA was in protest against the Simon Commission. They bombed the members of the Simon Commission. Following the death of Lala Lajpat Rai, who died due to lathicharge while leading a peaceful protest against the commission, they bombed the Central Legislative Assembly in Delhi. They demonstrated protest against the introduction of the Public Safety Bill and the Trade Disputes Bill, both of which had been drafted in an attempt to counter the effects of revolutionary activities and trade unionism. The Assembly Bomb case and the Saunders murder case trial followed and Singh, Sukhdev and Rajguru were hanged on 23 March 1931 for their actions.

=== Communist Consolidation ===
On 12 May 1933, some of the prisoners of Cellular Jail gathered and started a hunger strike, causing the deaths of Mahavir Singh, Mohan Kishore Namadas, and Mohit Moitra. The British Raj acceded to the demands of the freedom fighters to stop the hunger strike and finally after 46 days hunger strike end on 26 June 1933. This marked the beginning of the revolutionary communist group. It was the largest resistance group against British rule in the Jail.

In 1935, Communist Consolidation was founded by 39 inmates, and led by communist leader Hare Krishna Konar. The maximum of its members believed on the concept of Marxism and Communist or Jugantar part of Anushilan Samiti. Although this was a secret revolutionary group and the members of this organization swelled higher and higher.

This organization again led the historical 36-days hunger strike in 1937 where the British government had to bow before the demands of the political prisoners.

They used slogans like "Inquilab Zindabad" and "Duniya ke Mazdooron ek ho". Gradually The organization's membership expanded rapidly to more than 800 inmates.

Some of its notable members were:

- Hare Krishna Konar, Founder of this organization, in April 1935
- Niranjan Sengupta
- Sudhangshu Dasgupta
- Nalini Dasgupta
- Shiv Verma
- Ganesh Ghosh
- Batukeshwar Dutt
- Jaidev Kapoor
- Ambika Chakrabarty
- Sachindra Nath Sanyal
- Subodh Roy
- Bejoy Kumar Sinha
- Jatindra Nath Das
- Manmath Nath Gupta

=== Communist Party of India ===
The Communist Party of India, one of the major communist party, which is still in existence, was formed on 26 December 1925 in Kanpur. S.V. Ghate was the first General Secretary of CPI. There were many communist groups formed by Indians with the help of foreigners in different parts of the world, Tashkent group of Contacts were made with Anushilan and Jugantar the groups in Bengal, and small communist groups were formed in Bombay (led by S.A. Dange), Madras (led by Singaravelu Chettiar), United Provinces (led by Shaukat Usmani), Punjab, Sindh (led by Ghulam Hussain) and Bengal (led by Muzaffar Ahmed). During the 1920s and the early 1930s the party was badly organised, and in practice there were several communist groups working with limited national co-ordination. The British colonial authorities had banned all communist activity, which made the task of building a united party very difficult. Between 1921 and 1924 there were three conspiracy trials against the communist movement; First Peshawar Conspiracy Case, Meerut Conspiracy Case and the Kanpur Bolshevik Conspiracy Case. In the first three cases, Russian-trained muhajir communists were put on trial. However, the Cawnpore trial had more political impact. On 17 March 1924, Shripad Amrit Dange, M.N. Roy, Muzaffar Ahmed, Nalini Gupta, Shaukat Usmani, Singaravelu Chettiar, Ghulam Hussain and R.C. Sharma were charged, in Cawnpore (now spelt Kanpur) Bolshevik Conspiracy case. The specific pip charge was that they as communists were seeking "to deprive the King Emperor of his sovereignty of British India, by complete separation of India from Britain by a violent revolution." Pages of newspapers daily splashed sensational communist plans and people for the first time learned, on such a large scale, about communism and its doctrines and the aims of the Communist International in India.

Singaravelu Chettiar was released on account of illness. M.N. Roy was in Germany and R.C. Sharma in French Pondichéry, and therefore could not be arrested. Ghulam Hussain confessed that he had received money from the Russians in Kabul and was pardoned. Muzaffar Ahmed, Nalini Gupta, Shaukat Usmani and Dange were sentenced for various terms of imprisonment. This case was responsible for actively introducing communism to a larger Indian audience. Dange was released from prison in 1927. Rahul Dev Pal was a prominent communist leader

On 25 December 1925 a communist conference was organised in Kanpur. Colonial authorities estimated that 500 persons took part in the conference. The conference was convened by a man called Satya Bhakta. At the conference Satyabhakta argued for a 'National communism' and against subordination under Comintern. Being outvoted by the other delegates, Satyabhakta left the conference venue in protest. The conference adopted the name 'Communist Party of India'. Groups such as Labour Kisan Party of Hindustan (LKPH) dissolved into the CPI. The émigré CPI, which probably had little organic character anyway, was effectively substituted by the organisation now operating inside India.

Soon after the 1926 conference of the Workers and Peasants Party of Bengal, the underground CPI directed its members to join the provincial Workers and Peasants Parties. All open communist activities were carried out through Workers and Peasants Parties.

The sixth congress of the Communist International met in 1928. In 1927 the Kuomintang had turned on the Chinese communists, which led to a review of the policy on forming alliances with the national bourgeoisie in the colonial countries. The Colonial theses of the 6th Comintern congress called upon the Indian communists to combat the 'national-reformist leaders' and to 'unmask the national reformism of the Indian National Congress and oppose all phrases of the Swarajists, Gandhists, etc. about passive resistance'. The congress did however differentiate between the character of the Chinese Kuomintang and the Indian Swarajist Party, considering the latter as neither a reliable ally nor a direct enemy. The congress called on the Indian communists to utilise the contradictions between the national bourgeoisie and the British imperialists. The congress also denounced the WPP. The Tenth Plenum of the executive committee of the Communist International, 3 July 1929 – 19 July 1929, directed the Indian communists to break with WPP. When the communists deserted it, the WPP fell apart.

On 20 March 1929, arrests against WPP, CPI and other labour leaders were made in several parts of India, in what became known as the Meerut Conspiracy Case. The communist leadership was now put behind bars. The trial proceedings were to last for four years.

As of 1934, the main centres of activity of CPI were Bombay, Calcutta and Punjab. The party had also begun extending its activities to Madras. A group of Andhra and Tamil students, amongst them P. Sundarayya, were recruited to the CPI by Amir Hyder Khan.

The party was reorganised in 1933, after the communist leaders from the Meerut trials were released. A central committee of the party was set up. In 1934 the party was accepted as the Indian section of the Communist International.

When Indian left-wing elements formed the Congress Socialist Party in 1934, the CPI branded it as Social Fascist.

The League Against Gandhism, initially known as the Gandhi Boycott Committee, was a political organisation in Calcutta, founded by the underground Communist Party of India and others to launch militant anti-Imperialist activities. The group took the name ‘League Against Gandhism’ in 1934.

In connection with the change of policy of the Comintern toward Popular Front politics, the Indian communists changed their relation to the Indian National Congress. The communists joined the Congress Socialist Party, which worked as the left wing of Congress. Through joining CSP, the CPI accepted the CSP demand for a Constituent Assembly, which it had denounced two years before. The CPI however analysed that the demand for a Constituent Assembly would not be a substitute for soviets.

In July 1937, clandestine meeting held at Calicut. Five persons were present at the meeting, P. Krishna Pillai, K. Damodaran, E.M.S. Namboodiripad, N. C. Sekhar and S.V. Ghate. The first four were members of the CSP in Kerala. The CPI in Kerala was formed on 31 December 1939 with the Pinarayi Conference. The latter, Ghate, was a CPI Central Committee member, who had arrived from Madras. Contacts between the CSP in Kerala and the CPI had begun in 1935, when P. Sundarayya (CC member of CPI, based in Madras at the time) met with EMS and Krishna Pillai. Sundarayya and Ghate visited Kerala at several times and met with the CSP leaders there. The contacts were facilitated through the national meetings of the Congress, CSP and All India Kisan Sabha.

In 1936–1937, the co-operation between socialists and communists reached its peak. At the 2nd congress of the CSP, held in Meerut in January 1936, a thesis was adopted which declared that there was a need to build 'a united Indian Socialist Party based on Marxism-Leninism'. At the 3rd CSP congress, held in Faizpur, several communists were included into the CSP National Executive Committee.

In Kerala communists won control over CSP, and for a brief period controlled Congress there.

Two communists, E.M.S. Namboodiripad and Z.A. Ahmed, became All India joint secretaries of CSP. The CPI also had two other members inside the CSP executive.

On the occasion of the 1940 Ramgarh Congress Conference CPI released a declaration called Proletarian Path, which sought to utilise the weakened state of the British Empire in the time of war and gave a call for general strike, no-tax, no-rent policies and mobilising for an armed revolutionary uprising. The National Executive of the CSP assembled at Ramgarh took a decision that all communists were expelled from CSP.

In July 1942, the CPI was legalised, as a result of Britain and the Soviet Union becoming allies against Nazi Germany. Communists strengthened their control over the All India Trade Union Congress. At the same time, communists were politically cornered for their opposition to the Quit India Movement.

The Communist Party of India opposed the partition of India and did not participate in the Independence Day celebrations of 15 August 1947 in protest of the division of the country.

=== Naujawan Bharat Sabha ===
Naujawan Bharat Sabha (NBS) was founded by revolutionary Bhagat Singh in March 1926. It was a left-wing Marxist association that sought to foment revolution against the British Raj. NBS was radical in its ideas relating to religion, to agrarian reform and movement. The organisation was noted for the involvement of its members in killing of John P. Saunders in December 1928. After that NBS organised protest against the Simon Commission in Lahore.

The association was banned in July 1929 during a period when the government had imposed Section 144 to control gatherings as public support burgeoned for the imprisoned Singh and his fellow hunger-strikers. NBS members were involved in the campaign.

NBS activist Sohan Singh Josh, was imprisoned for his role in the Meerut Conspiracy Case. NBS became one of the three significant left-wing groups in Punjab, the others being the outlawed Communist Party of India and the Kirti Kisan Party. These three attempted an alliance and sought also to gather together various smaller left wing organisations. All associations considered to be left-wing were declared illegal under the Criminal Law Amendment Act (1908) in September 1934.

Notable leaders of NBS include Bhagat Singh, Karam Singh Mann, Sohan Singh Josh and others.

=== Kirti Kisan Party ===
The Workers and Peasants Party or Kirti Kisan party was founded in Bengal in 1925, as the Labour Swaraj Party of the Indian National Congress by Kazi Nazrul Islam, Hemanta Kumar Sarkar, Qutubuddin Ahmad and Shamsuddin Hussain. The WPPs had much influence in Bombay, Punjab, Uttar Pradesh and Bengal. The WPP representatives together with Nehru were able to convince the AICC to make the Indian National Congress an associate member of the League against Imperialism. WPP was successful in mobilising trade union work. It built unions amongst printing press, municipal and dock workers. It gained influence amongst the workers of the Great Indian Peninsular Railway. During 1928 the WPP led a general strike in Bombay, which lasted for months. At the time of the strike, the Girni Kamgar Union was founded. During the protests against the Simon Commission, the WPP played a major role in organising manifestations in Calcutta and Bombay. In Bombay it also mobilised 'hartal' (general strike) in protest against the Simon Commission. The party also worked for the abolishment of 'zamindari' system in agriculture.

On 20 March 1929, arrests against WPP, CPI and other labour leaders were made in several parts of India, in what became known as the Meerut Conspiracy Case. Most of the WPP leadership was now put behind bars. The trial proceedings were to last for four years, thus outliving the WPP. Tengdi, the WPP of Bombay president, died whilst the trial was still going on. After the arrests of its main leaders, the WPP was dissolved.

Notable leaders of this party were Nares Chandra Sen-Gupta, Hemanta Kumar Sarkar, Qutubuddin Ahmad, S.S. Mirajkar, Philip Spratt and many others. ref>Surjeet, Harkishan Surjeet. March of the Communist Movement in India – An Introduction to the Documents of the History of the Communist Movement in India. Calcutta: National Book Agency, 1998. p. 25

== First demand for Purna Swaraj ==
Congress leader and famous poet Hasrat Mohani and Communist Party of India leader Swami Kumaranand were the first activists to demand complete independence (Purna Swaraj) from the British in 1921 resolution from an All-India Congress Forum at the Ahmedabad Session of AICC. Maghfoor Ahmad Ajazi supported the 'Purna Swaraj' motion demanded by Hasrat Mohani.

== Kakori Train Robbery ==
One of the successful efforts of Hindustan Socialist Republican Association (then known as HRA) was Kakori Train Robbery in Kakori, a village near Lucknow, on 9 August 1925, during the Indian Independence Movement against the British Raj. The robbery plan was executed by Ram Prasad Bismil, Ashfaqullah Khan, Rajendra Lahiri, Chandrashekhar Azad, Sachindra Bakshi, Keshab Chakravarty, Manmathnath Gupta, Mukundi Lal, Murari Lal Gupta and Banwari Lal.

On 9 August 1925, the Number 8 Down Train on the Saharanpur Railway lines was travelling from Shahjahanpur to Lucknow. When it passed Kakori one of the revolutionaries, Rajendra Lahiri, pulled the emergency chain to stop the train and subsequently, the other revolutionaries overpowered the guard. They looted only these bags (which were present in the guards' cabin and contained about ₹ 4600) which belonged to the Indians and were being transferred to the British government treasury. One passenger was killed unintentionally.

Following the incident, the British administration started an intense manhunt and arrested several of the revolutionaries who were members or part of the HRA. Their leader, Ram Prasad Bismil was arrested at Shahjahanpur on 26 October 1925 and Ashfaqullah Khan was arrested on 7 December 1926 at Delhi.

== Peshawar Conspiracy Case (1922–1927) ==
The colonial government feared that the defendants were entering India with the purpose of spreading socialist and communist ideas and supporting the emerging independence movement. Five legal cases which took place between 1922 and 1927 which are known as the Peshawar Conspiracy Cases. British government cased against 40 to 50 muhajirs, who had formed the CPI in 1920 in Tashkent of Soviet Union where they gained political and military training at the Communist University of the Toilers of the East in Moscow. The muhajirs were mainly Khilafatis who intended to go to Turkey to fight the British, but they met M.N. Roy in Tashkent and with him laid the foundation of the first Communist Party of India. They were charged under section 121-A, and accused of fermenting "a proletarian revolution against the British imperialist oppressors to restore freedom to the masses". This became popular and galvanized the imagination of the young population of the Indian subcontinent.

== Kanpur Bolshevik Conspiracy Case (1924–1925) ==
In March 1924, S. A. Dange, M. N. Roy, Muzaffar Ahmed, Nalini Bhushan Dasgupta, Shaukat Usmani, Singaravelu Chettiar, Ghulam Hussain, Rafiq Ahmad, Shaukat Usmani and other communists were charged with seeking "to deprive the King Emperor of his sovereignty of British India, by complete separation of India from imperialistic Britain by a violent revolution". It was called the Cawnpore (now spelt Kanpur) Bolshevik Conspiracy case, and was initiated in 1924. It brought scrutiny of an alleged Comintern plan to foment revolution in India: "Pages of newspapers daily splashed sensational communist plans and people for the first time learned such a large scale about communism and its doctrines and the aims of the Communist International in India". The case was considered a key factor in introducing communism to the Indian masses.

Britain triumphantly declared that the Kanpur case had "finished off the communists". But the industrial town of Kanpur, in December 1925, witnessed a conference of different communist groups, under the chairmanship of Singaravelu Chettiar. Dange, Muzaffar Ahmed, Nalini Gupta, Shaukat Usmani were among the organizers of the conference. It adopted a resolution for the formation of the Communist Party of India with its headquarters in Bombay.

== Lahore Conspiracy Case ==
Influenced by Auguste Vaillant, a French anarchist who had bombed the Chamber of Deputies in Paris, Bhagat Singh made a plan to explode a bomb inside the Central Legislative Assembly. On 8 April 1929, Singh, accompanied by Batukeshwar Dutt, threw two bombs into the Assembly chamber from its public gallery while it was in session. The bombs had been designed not to kill, but some members, including George Ernest Schuster, the finance member of the Viceroy's Executive Council, were injured. The smoke from the bombs filled the Assembly so that Singh and Dutt could probably have escaped in the confusion had they wished. Instead, they stayed shouting the slogan "Inquilab Zindabad!" ("Long Live the Revolution") and threw leaflets. The two men were arrested and subsequently moved through a series of jails in Delhi. Trials began in the first week of June, following a preliminary hearing in May. On 12 June, both men were sentenced to life imprisonment for: "causing explosions of a nature likely to endanger life, unlawfully and maliciously." Dutt had been defended by Asaf Ali, while Singh defended himself. On 15 April 1929, the Lahore bomb factories in Lahore and Saharanpur were discovered by the police, leading to the arrest of other members of HSRA, including Sukhdev, Kishori Lal, Jai Gopal, Rajguru, and 21 others. Singh was re-arrested for murdering Saunders and Chanan Singh based on substantial evidence against him, including statements by his associates, Hans Raj Vohra and Jai Gopal. His life sentence in the Assembly Bomb case was deferred until the Saunders case was decided. He was sent to Central Jail Mianwali from the Delhi jail. There he witnessed discrimination between European and Indian prisoners. They demanded equality in food standards, clothing, toiletries, and other hygienic necessities, as well as access to books and a daily newspaper. They argued that they should not be forced to do manual labour or any undignified work in the jail and started hunger strike. The hunger strike inspired a rise in public support for Singh and his colleagues from around June 1929. The Tribune newspaper was particularly prominent in this movement and reported on mass meetings in places such as Lahore and Amritsar. The government had to apply Section 144 of the criminal code in an attempt to limit gatherings. Jawaharlal Nehru and Muhammad Ali Jinnah both talked in favour of Central Jail Mianwali. Since the activities of the hunger strikers had gained popularity and attention amongst the people nationwide, the government decided to advance the start of the Saunders murder trial, which was henceforth called the Lahore Conspiracy Case. Singh was transported to Borstal Jail, Lahore, and the trial began there on 10 July 1929. In addition to charging them with the murder of Saunders, Singh and the 27 other prisoners were charged with plotting a conspiracy to murder Scott, and waging a war against the King. Singh, still on hunger strike, had to be carried to the court handcuffed on a stretcher; he had lost 14 pounds (6.4 kg) from his original weight of 133 pounds (60 kg) since beginning the strike.

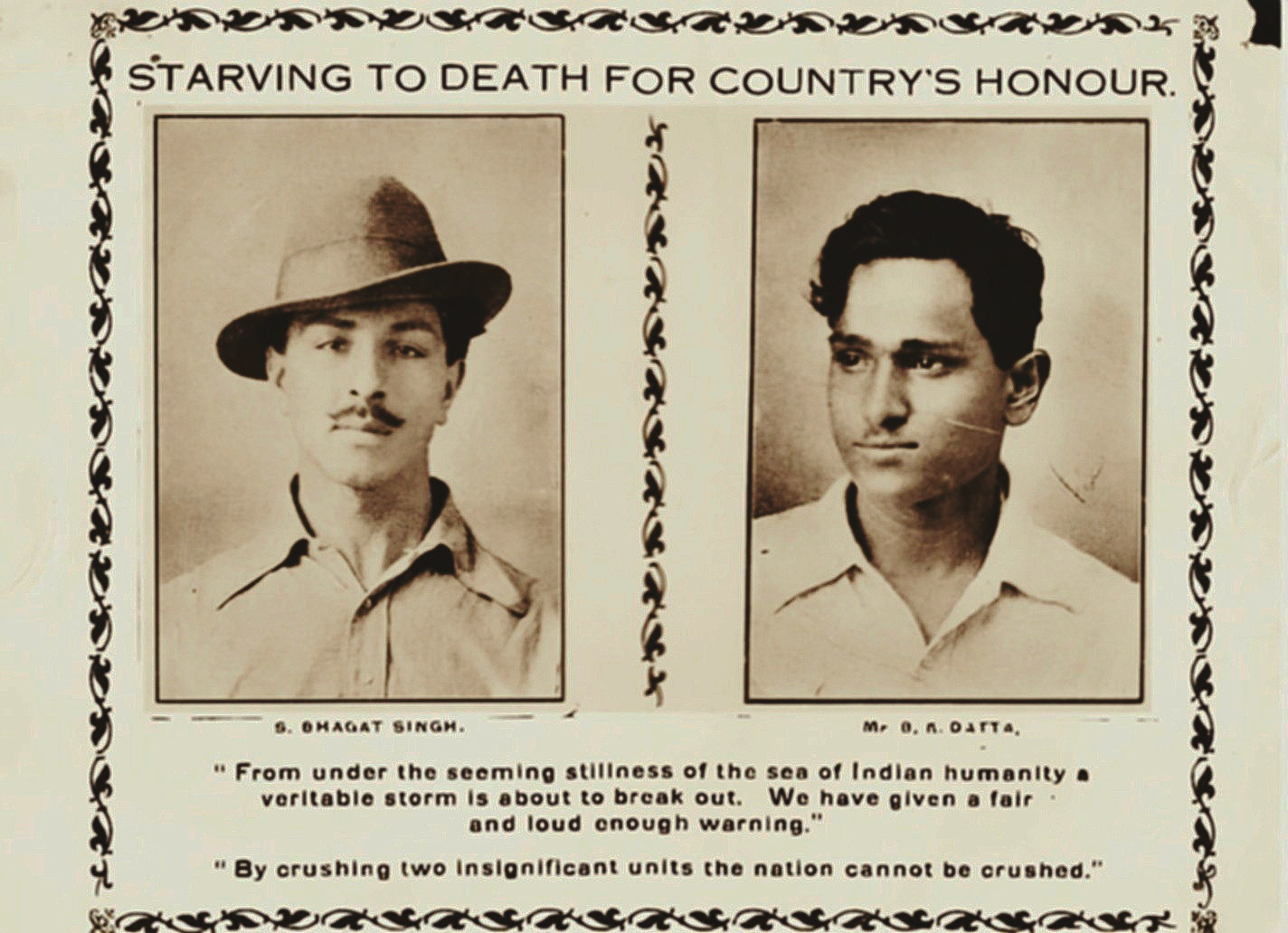
Hunger strike poster of Bhagat Singh and Batukeshswar Dutt

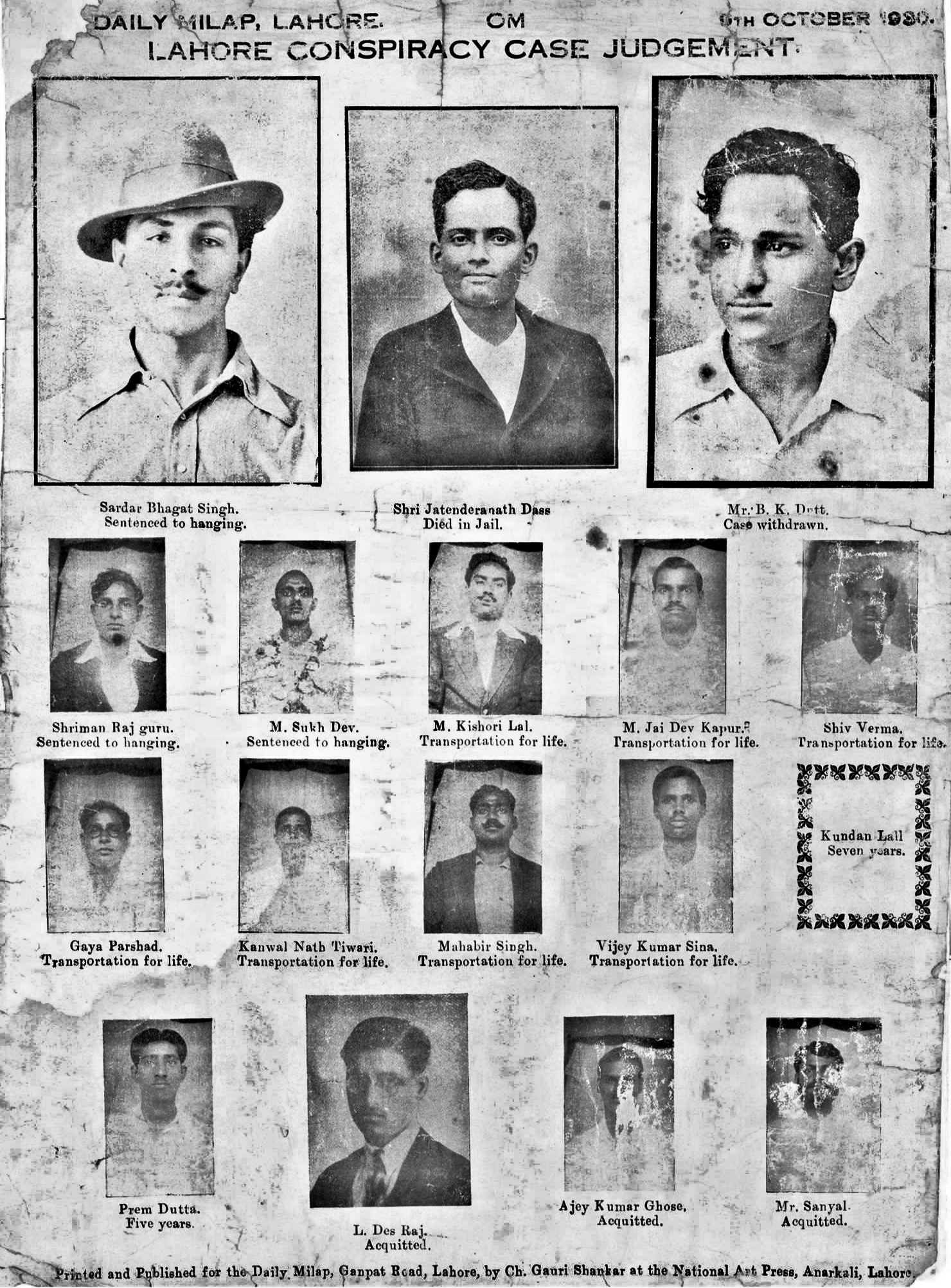
Daily milap poster of the Lahore conspiracy case 1930.Death sentence of Bhagat Singh, Sukhdev and Rajguru.

A Crown prosecution team was created comprising C. H. Carden-Noad, Kalandar Ali Khan, Jai Gopal Lal, and the prosecuting inspector, Bakshi Dina Nath. The defence was composed of eight lawyers. Prem Dutt Verma, the youngest amongst the 27 accused, threw his slipper at Gopal when he turned and became a prosecution witness in court. As a result, the magistrate ordered that all the accused should be handcuffed. Singh and others refused to be handcuffed and were subjected to brutal beating. The revolutionaries refused to attend the court and Singh wrote a letter to the magistrate citing various reasons for their refusal. The magistrate ordered the trial to proceed without the accused or members of the HSRA. This was a setback for Singh as he could no longer use the trial as a forum to publicise his views. To speed up the slow trial, the Viceroy, Lord Irwin, declared an emergency on 1 May 1930 and introduced an ordinance to set up a special tribunal composed of three high court judges for the case. This decision cut short the normal process of justice as the only appeal after the tribunal was to the Privy Council located in England. On 2 July 1930, a habeas corpus petition was filed in the High Court challenging the ordinance on the grounds that it was ultra vires and, therefore, illegal; the Viceroy had no powers to shorten the customary process of determining justice. The petition argued that the Defence of India Act 1915 allowed the Viceroy to introduce an ordinance, and set up such a tribunal, only under conditions of a breakdown of law-and-order, which, it was claimed in this case, had not occurred. However, the petition was dismissed as being premature. Carden-Noad presented the government's charges of conducting robberies, and the illegal acquisition of arms and ammunition among others. The evidence of G. T. H. Hamilton Harding, the Lahore superintendent of police, shocked the court. He stated that he had filed the first information report against the accused under specific orders from the chief secretary to the governor of Punjab and that he was unaware of the details of the case. The prosecution depended mainly on the evidence of P. N. Ghosh, Hans Raj Vohra, and Jai Gopal who had been Singh's associates in the HSRA. On 10 July 1930, the tribunal decided to press charges against only 15 of the 18 accused and allowed their petitions to be taken up for hearing the next day. The trial ended on 30 September 1930. The three accused, whose charges were withdrawn, included Dutt who had already been given a life sentence in the Assembly bomb case. The ordinance (and the tribunal) would lapse on 31 October 1930 as it had not been passed by the Central Assembly or the British Parliament. On 7 October 1930, the tribunal delivered its 300-page judgement based on all the evidence and concluded that the participation of Singh, Sukhdev, and Rajguru in Saunder's murder was proven. They were sentenced to death by hanging. Of the other accused, three were acquitted (Ajoy Ghosh, Jatindra Nath Sanyal and Des Raj), Kundan Lal received seven years' rigorous imprisonment, Prem Dutt received five years of the same, and the remaining seven (Kishori Lal, Mahabir Singh, Bijoy Kumar Sinha, Shiv Verma, Gaya Prasad, Jai Dev and Kamalnath Tewari) were all sentenced to transportation for life. In Punjab province, a defence committee drew up a plan to appeal to the Privy Council. Singh was initially against the appeal but later agreed to it in the hope that the appeal would popularise the HSRA in Britain. The appellants claimed that the ordinance which created the tribunal was invalid while the government countered that the Viceroy was completely empowered to create such a tribunal. The appeal was dismissed by Judge Viscount Dunedin.

After the rejection of the appeal to the Privy Council, Congress party president Madan Mohan Malaviya filed a mercy appeal before Irwin on 14 February 1931. Some prisoners sent Mahatma Gandhi an appeal to intervene. In his notes dated 19 March 1931, the Viceroy recorded: "While returning Gandhiji asked me if he could talk about the case of Bhagat Singh because newspapers had come out with the news of his slated hanging on March 24th. It would be a very unfortunate day because on that day the new president of the Congress had to reach Karachi and there would be a lot of hot discussion. I explained to him that I had given a very careful thought to it but I did not find any basis to convince myself to commute the sentence. It appeared he found my reasoning weighty." The Communist Party of Great Britain expressed its reaction to the case: "The history of this case, of which we do not come across any example in relation to the political cases, reflects the symptoms of callousness and cruelty which is the outcome of bloated desire of the imperialist government of Britain so that fear can be instilled in the hearts of the repressed people."

A plan to rescue Singh and fellow HSRA inmates from the jail failed. HSRA member Durga Devi's husband, Bhagwati Charan Vohra, attempted to manufacture bombs for the purpose, but died when they exploded accidentally.

== Meerut Conspiracy Case (1929-1933) ==
The British government was clearly worried about the growing influence of the Communist International and all infiltration of communist and socialist ideas was propagated to the workers by the Communist Party of India (CPI). The government's immediate response was to foist yet another conspiracy case, the Meerut Conspiracy Case.

In more than one way, the trial helped the Communist Party of India to consolidate its position among workers. Dange, along with 32 other persons, was arrested on or about 20 March 1929 and put on trial under Section 121A of the Indian Penal Code:

Whoever within or without British India conspires to commit any of the offenses punishable by Section 121 or to deprive the King of the sovereignty of British India or any part thereof, or conspires to overawe, by means of criminal force or the show of criminal force, the Government of India or any local Government, shall be punished with transportation for life, or any shorter term, or with imprisonment of either description which may extend to ten years.

== Hunger strikes in Andaman ==
On 12 May 1933, some of the prisoners of Cellular Jail gathered and started a hunger strike, causing the deaths of Mahavir Singh, Mohan Kishore Namadas, and Mohit Moitra. The British Raj acceded to the demands of the freedom fighters to stop the hunger strike and finally after 46 days hunger strike end on 26 June 1933. This marked the beginning of the Communist Consolidation. It was the largest resistance group against British rule in the Jail. They led the historical 36-days hunger strike in 1937 where the British government had to bow before the demands of the political prisoners.

== Intellectual history and Colonial publication ==
Communist ideas were introduced to the Indian intelligentsia through the popularity of the Bolshevik Revolution. Bipin Chandra Pal and Bal Gangadhar Tilak were among the most prominent Indian freedom fighters who expressed their admiration for Vladimir Lenin. The spread of ideas and intellectual advances in Communism was primarily made through a network of publications. One of the first books about Communism was Lenin, published in 1921, by Phanibhushan Ghosh. A Bengali translation of Bertrand Russell's Theory and practice of Bolshevism was published in 1924 by Shaileshnath Bishi. S. A. Dange published a pamphlet in 1921 titled Gandhi Vs. Lenin, a comparative study of the approaches of both the leaders with Lenin coming out as better of the two. Communist critiques of Gandhism had begun to spread around the nation with the publication of the pamphlet. 'League against Gandhism' was founded as an organisation of the underground Communist Party of India in Calcutta, initially called the Gandhi Boycott Committee, the organisation adopted this name in 1934.

== Notable communist revolutionaries ==
Some notable communist revolutionaries were:

- Bhagat Singh, known for killing of John P. Saunders and assembly bomb case
- Ashfaqulla Khan, co-founder of the Hindustan Republican Association
- Muzaffar Ahmad, politician, journalist and co-founder of the Communist party of India, arrested in the Kanpur Bolshevik Conspiracy Case
- Saumyendranath Tagore, Founder of the Revolutionary Communist Party of India and Grand-nephew of Rabindranath Tagore, arrested in Germany for alleged plot to assassinate Hitler
- Manabendranath Roy, founder of Communist Party of India and Communist party of Mexico
- Bhupendranath Datta, Anthropologist and member of the Comintern, younger brother of Swami Vivekananda
- A. K. Hangal, later became a successful Indian actor
- Hare Krishna Konar, Marxist revolutionary, radical activist, founder of Communist Consolidation
- Utpal Dutt, playwright, Communist activist, director and popular actor, founder of the Little Theatre Group
- Sohan Singh Bhakna, founding president of the Ghadar Party
- Ram Prasad Bismil, involved in Manipuri conspiracy and Kakori conspiracy, one of the founding members of Hindustan Republican Association
- Roshan Singh, participated in Bamrauli dacoity
- Rajendra Lahiri, involved in Kakori conspiracy and Dakshineshwar bombing
- Rahul Sankrityayan, Marxist revolutionary and author, imprisoned at Buxar and Hazaribagh
- Chandra Shekhar Azad, involved in the Kakori Train Robbery of 1925, the shooting of John P. Saunders at Lahore in 1928 and at last, in the attempt to blow up the Viceroy of India's train in 1929
- Niranjan Sengupta, leader of the Barisal branch of Dhaka Anushilan Samiti, one of the seven members of an inner committee set up by the Communist Party of India Politburo
- Sudhangshu Dasgupta, involved in the Mechuabazar Bomb Case, worked in the worker's movements
- Shiv Verma, marxist revolutionary and a member of the Hindustan Socialist Republican Association
- Ganesh Ghosh
- Batukeshwar Dutt
- Jaidev Kapoor
- Ambika Chakrabarty
- Sachindra Nath Sanyal
- Subodh Roy
- Bejoy Kumar Sinha
- Jatindra Nath Das
- Manmath Nath Gupta

== See also ==
- Indian independence movement
- Revolutionary movement for Indian independence
- Royal Indian Navy mutiny
