= Kakori railway station =

Railway Station in Uttar Pradesh, India

General information
- Location: State Highway 25, Kakori, Uttar Pradesh; India
- Elevation: 130 metres (430 ft)
- System: Express train and Passenger train station
- Owner: Indian Railways
- Platforms: 2
- Tracks: 4
- Connections: Auto stand

Construction
- Structure type: Standard (on-ground station)
- Parking: No
- Cycle facilities: No

Other information
- Status: Active
- Station code: KKJ
- Zone(s): Northern Railway zone
- Division(s): Moradabad

History
- Rebuilt: 2016; 10 years ago
Location

Kakori railway station is a small railway station in Lucknow district, Uttar Pradesh. Its code is KKJ. It serves Kakori village.

== History ==
On 9 August 1925, the station came into light of the world history when Indian revolutionary Ram Prasad Bismil, Ashfaqulla Khan, Rajendra Lahiri, Chandra Shekhar Azad, Sachindra Bakshi, Keshab Chakravarthy, Manmath Nath Gupta, Murari Lal Gupta (fake name of Murari Lal Khanna), Mukundi Lal (Mukundi Lal Gupta) and Banwari Lal snatched the government's treasury from a train. The incident is called as Kakori train robbery or the Kakori conspiracy case of British period.
