= Ashfaqulla Khan =

Indian revolutionary (1900–1927)

Shaheed Ashfaque Ullah Khān
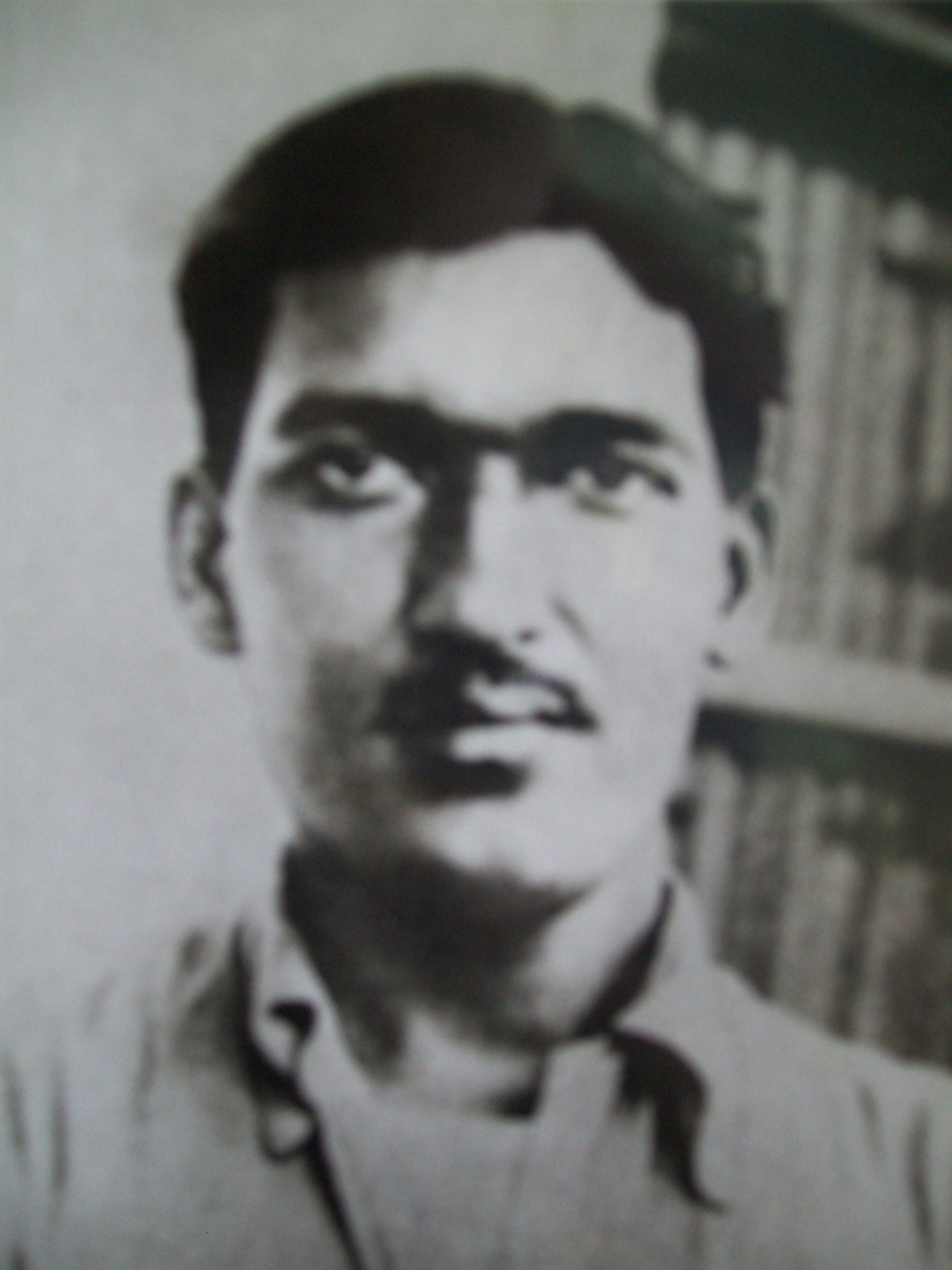
- Ashfaqulla Khan in 1919
- Born: 22 October 1900; Shahjahanpur, North-Western Provinces, British India
- Died: 19 December 1927 (aged 27); Faizabad, United Provinces, British India
- Cause of death: Execution by hanging
- Occupation: Revolutionary
- Organization: Hindustan Republican Association
- Known for: Being a mastermind behind the Kakori train robbery
- Movement: Indian independence
- Website: Official website

Ashfaque ullah Khan (22 October 1900 – 19 December 1927) was an Indian freedom fighter and martyr in the Indian independence movement against British rule, and the co-founder of the Hindustan Republican Association, later to become the Hindustan Socialist Republican Association.

== Early life ==
Khan was born in the Shahjahanpur district of the United Provinces and was of Pathan descent. He was the youngest among his five siblings.

In 1918, while Khan was in the seventh standard, police raided his school and arrested fellow student Rajaram Bhartiya with regard to the Mainpuri Conspiracy, in which activists organised looting in Mainpuri to fund the publication of anti-colonial literature. The arrest spurred Khan's engagement in revolutionary activities in the United Provinces.

Khan met Ram Prasad Bismil, a revolutionary who was closely involved in the Mainpuri Conspiracy, through a friend. He soon became closely tied to Bismil and joined him in activities related to non-cooperation, the Swaraj Party, and the Hindustan Republican Association. Bismil and Khan were also both poets, with Khan writing Urdu poetry under the pseudonym Hasrat. It is said that the Britishers had to keep Bismil and Ashfaq in cells far away from each other because they would sing "Sarfaroshi ki tamanna ab hamare dil mein hai, dekhna hai zor kitna baazu-e-katil mein hai" and hear each other's voices and then laugh triumphantly in the face of atrocities. This irritated and broke the will of their oppressors. They chose each other and their fight for freedom and were hanged in the end, and happily so, after the trial for the Kakori rail dacoity.

Like others in the Hindustan Republican Association, Khan was strongly inspired by Lenin and the Bolshevik Revolution in Russia. He expressed beliefs in the liberation of the poor and the rejection of capitalist interests. He also spoke against religious communalism, identifying it as a British tool to control the Indian population and prevent Indian independence.

== Involvement in the Kakori conspiracy ==
The revolutionaries of the Hindustan Republican Association organised a meeting in Shahjahanpur on 8 August 1925 to determine how to raise funds for arms and ammunition. They decided to rob a train carrying government cash through Kakori. The HRA had previously executed similar train robberies, inspired by the Russian Bolshevik technique of using robbery to fund revolutionary operations. He was originally against the Kakori train robbery, but eventually agreed to participate when others in the HRA expressed approval of the plan.

On 9 August 1925, Khan and other revolutionaries, namely Ram Prasad Bismil, Rajendra Lahiri, Sachindra Bakshi, Chandrashekhar Azad, Keshab Chakravarty, Banwari Lal, Murari Lal Gupta, Mukundi Lal, and Manmathnath Gupta, attacked and robbed a government train in Kakori near Lucknow. After the robbery, the British government launched an extensive investigative campaign to catch the perpetrators. On the morning of 26 October 1925, Bismil was caught by the police. Khan fled to Nepal to evade capture. From Nepal, he travelled to Kanpur and then Daltonganj, where he worked as a clerk at an engineering firm under a pseudonym.

Ashfaqullah Khan was a mureed (disciple) of Ram Prasad Bismil and later his closest friend in life and death. Both were captured by the British and asked to testify against each other. A Muslim soldier of the British cavalry was appointed to influence Ashfaq into speaking up against Ram Prasad Bismil by convincing him that Ram was a Hindu and sought freedom for a nation only for Hindus, and Muslims were better off with Britishers. A similar treatment was meted out to Ram Prasad Bismil as well.

== Capture and trial ==
Eventually, Khan decided to travel to Delhi to continue his revolutionary activities. While in Delhi, he met with a Pathan friend he had known in Shahjahanpur, who secretly reported his whereabouts to the police. On the morning of 7 December 1926, Khan was captured and arrested by the Delhi Police. He was detained in the District Jail at Faizabad and a case was filed against him.

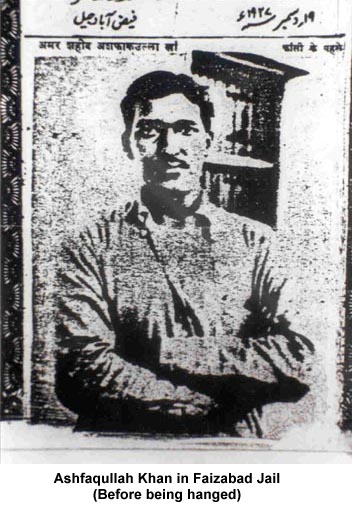
Ashfaqulla Khan in Faizabad jail on the morning he was hanged

The trial of the Kakori train robbers was held for over a year in Lucknow and received significant interest from the public. The HRA had released an official statement in 1925 claiming that they did not consider themselves terrorists and instead saw their revolutionary activities as a way to fight back against the violence of the colonial government. While in prison, Khan wrote a letter that expressed a similar sentiment, confirming that he did not aim to spread violence through the HRA but only hoped to ensure India's independence.

== Death and aftermath ==
The case for the Kakori dacoity was concluded by imposing the death sentence on Bismil, Khan, Lahiri, and Roshan. The others were given life sentences. Khan was sentenced to death by hanging and executed on 19 December 1927 at the Faizabad Jail.

Just before he was hanged at the Faizabad jail, he was asked about his last wish. In reply, he recited the following

"Kuchh aarzoo naheeN hai, hai aarzoo to yeh hai

Rakh de koi zara si KHaak-e-watan kafan men

bahaar aaii hai, shorish hai, junoon-e-fitnaa saamaaN kii

ilaahii Khair rakhnaa too mire jaib-o-GhariibaaN kii

bhalaa jazbaat-e-ulfat bhii kahiiN miTne se miTte haiN

abas haiN dhamkiaaN daar-o-rasan kii aur zindaaN kii

vo gulshan jo kabhii aazaad thaa guzare zamaane meN

maiN hooN shaaKh-e-shikasta yaaN usii ujaRhe gulistaaN kii

nahiiN tum se shikaayat ham_safeeraan-e-chaman mujh ko

mirii taqdeer hii meN thaa qafas aur qaid zindaaN kii #Ashfaqullah #shair

zamiiN dushman, zamaaN dushman, jo apne the paraae haiN

sunoge daastaaN kyaa tum, mire haal-e-pareeshaaN kii

ye jhagRhe aur bakheRhe meT kar aapas meN mil jaao

abas tafreeq hai tum meN yeh hindoo aur musalmaaN kii

sabhii saamaan-e-ishrat the, maze se apnii kaTtii thii

watan ke ishq ne ham ko havaa khilvaaii zindaaN kii

ba_hamd illaah chamak uTThaa sitaaraa merii qismat kaa

ki taqleed-e-haqeeqee kii ataa shaah-e-shaheedaaN kii

idhar Khauf-e-KhizaaN hai aashiyaaN ka Gham udhar dil ko

hameN yaksaaN hai tafreeh-e-chaman aur qaid zindaaN kii"

The six-feet tall Ashfaqulla Khan then went up to the pole bravely like a lion and kissed the rope stating, “My hands are not soiled with the murder of man. The charge against me is false. God will give me justice.” Then he prayed “La ilahi il Allah, Mohammed Ur Rasool Allah.” (There is no god but God, and Muhammad is the messenger of God.) He is considered a martyr for the cause of India's independence.

After the hangings of Khan, Bismil, Lahiri, and Roshan, the HRA changed their name to the Hindustan Socialist Republican Army and began officially espousing socialist and Marxist ideologies.

== In popular culture ==
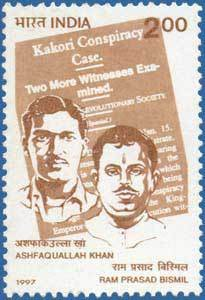
Ashfaqualla Khan and Ram Prasad Bismil featured on a postage stamp of India, 1997

The actions of Khan and his compatriots have been depicted in the Hindi film Rang De Basanti (2006), where his character is depicted by Kunal Kapoor. Chetanya Adib portrayed Khan in the Star Bharat television series Chandrashekhar. Mujahid-E-Azadi – Ashfaqullah Khan, an Indian television series that aired on DD Urdu in 2014, starred Gaurav Nanda in the title role.

‘Oh my motherland, I live only to serve you. Whether I am sentenced for life or given a death sentence, I shall sing thy glories even with my chained hands.
Death comes but once; Why fear it?’

— Ashfaqullā

== See also ==
- Hindustan Socialist Republican Association
- Mohammad Abdullah
- Sher Ali Afridi
- Shivaram Rajguru
- Ram Prasad Bismil

== General bibliography ==
- S. Waris, Prof. Farukh (2003). UNSUNG HEROES Volume-II (PDF). Indus Soucebooks. pp. 8–14. ISBN 978-81-88569-33-5.
