= Shahjahanpur Rang Mahotsav =

Shahajahanpur Rang Mahotsav शाहजहांपुर रंग महोत्सव
- Genre: Indian Dance, Theatre
- Dates: Third week of December (16–19 December 2014)
- Location: Shahjahanpur
- Years active: 2014 – present
- Founded: 2012
- Patron: Abhivyakti Natya Manch
- Website: http://www.sharangm.org

Shahjahanpur Rang Mahotsav (SRM) is an Indian dance and theatre competition. The first event was held in December 2014 at Shahjahanpur, Uttar Pradesh. The event is organised jointly by Abhivyakti Natya Manch and a social group called Maas.

In Shahjahanpur Rang Mahotsav, teams have participated from Uttar Pradesh, Madhya Pradesh, Bihar, Jharkhand, Maharashtra, Odisha, West Bengal, Uttarakhand, Assam, Manipur, Rajasthan, Chhattisgarh, and Karnataka.

In 2014, a total of nineteen teams participated, and in 2015 participation increased to twenty-seven teams.
