= Pt Ram Prasad Bismil railway station =

Railway Station in Uttar Pradesh, India

General information
- Location: State Highway 25, Uttar Pradesh; India
- Coordinates: 27.8112°N 79.9584°E
- Elevation: 154 metres (505 ft)
- System: Indian Railways station
- Owner: Indian Railways
- Operator: Northern Railway
- Platforms: 2
- Tracks: 4 (double electrified BG)
- Connections: Auto stand

Construction
- Structure type: Standard (on ground station)
- Parking: No
- Cycle facilities: No

Other information
- Status: Functioning
- Station code: PRPM
- Zone(s): Northern Railway
- Division(s): Moradabad
Location
- Location within India Location within Uttar Pradesh

Pt Ram Prasad Bismil railway station is a small railway station in Shahjahanpur district, Uttar Pradesh, India. Its code is PRPM. It serves Shahjahanpur city. The station is named after Ram Prasad Bismil. The station consists of two platforms. The platform lacks water and sanitation.
