= Murari Sharma =

Indian revolutionary

Murari Lal Khanna (Alias Murari Sharma)
- Born: Murari Lal Khanna; 1 January 1901; Shahjahanpur, British India
- Died: 2 April 1982 (aged 81); Shahjahanpur, Uttar Pradesh, India
- Occupation: Freedom fighter
- Organization: Hindustan Socialist Republican Association
- Movement: Indian Independence Movement

Murari Lal (Hindi: मुरारी शर्मा), (1 January 1901 – 2 April 1982) also known as Murari Sharma was an Indian revolutionary who took part in the Kakori Conspiracy and absconded away. Police could not trace him out as Murari Sharma was his fake name.

His birth name was Murari Lal Khanna. While speaking as a Chief Guest this fact was disclosed by his son Damodar Swarup 'Vidrohi' – a revolutionary poet of Shahjahanpur district in the "Ram Prasad Bismil Jayanti Sangoshthi" organised by Hindi Academy Delhi on 19 June 1997 at Rajendra Bhawan New Delhi.

He was born on 1 January 1901 to Chhote Lal a khandsari (en. sugar producing business man) of village Mudia Panwar in Shahjahanpur district of Uttar Pradesh. For some times he lived underground in Delhi and later on returned to his native village. He died natural death on 2 April 1982 in his house of Shahjahanpur at the age of 81.

== See also ==
- Shahjahanpur District
- Ram Prasad Bismil
- Kakori Conspiracy
- Indian independence movement
