= Rajkumari Gupta =

Indian activist

Raj Kumari Gupta
- Born: 1902; Kanpur, India
- Known for: Member of Kakori conspiracy
- Spouse: Madan Mohan Gupta

Rajkumari Gupta (born 1902, Kanpur) was a freedom fighter known for her Role in Kakori conspiracy. Rajkumari Gupta served jail terms in 1930, '32 and '42 for Kakori Conspiracy.

== Early life ==
Rajkumari Gupta was born in 1902 in Banda Zilla of Kanpur. Gupta married Madan Mohan Gupta when she was in early 13 years of age.

== Freedom struggle ==
Rajkumari Gupta along with her husband formed a close connection with Mahatma Gandhi and Chandrashekar Azad at Allahabad. Gupta's role as described by newspapers was supplying guns and passing secret letters to the fellow nationalists involved in Kakori Conspiracy. With the abrupt stoppage of the Non-Cooperation Movement in 1924, Rajkumari was drawn more into revolutionary ideas and landed in the close circle of Chandrashekhar Azad. Having established close links with the revolutionaries, particularly Chandrashekhar Azad, Rajkumari began delivering secret messages and materials to Chandrashekar Azad comrades in the Hindustan Socialist Republican Association (HRA) without the knowledge of her husband and in-laws.

As mentioned in Women in the Indian National Movement: Unseen Faces and Unheard Voices, 1930-42 by SuruchiThapar-Bjorkert, Walking in afield hiding firearms under her garment, she got arrested. Her in-laws disowned her upon hearing the news. They even went onto claim in the local newspaper Vir Bhagat, that they didn't have any relationship with her. Gupta led a secluded life after this incident.

Rajkumari Gupta, an associate of Chandra Sekhar Azad, while speaking on behalf on all women in a freedom struggle in interaction with the author Sagari Chhabra said, "Humko jo karna tha, kiya" (What We have to do, we did). Further she says, "Hum upar se Gandhivaadi the, neeche se krantivaadi" (We were Gandhians from above; underneath we were revolutionaries).

== See also ==
- Kakori Conspiracy
- Indian independence movement
