= Keshab Chakravarthy =

Indian freedom fighter

Keshab Chakravarty (or Keshab Chakraborty) was an Indian freedom fighter and one of the youth involved in the Kakori conspiracy.

== Early life ==
Keshab Chakravarthy was a student at Calcutta Medical College and a close ally of Sham Sundar Chakravarthy, who was an active member of Anushilan Samiti.

== Freedom struggle and Kakori train robbery ==
Keshab was a prominent Indian revolutionary belonging to Hindustan Republican Association (HRA, became the Hindustan Socialist Republican Association or HSRA in 1928) that was created to carry out revolutionary activities against the British Empire in India.

Keshab was a part of a group of young freedom fighters, along with Chandrashekhar Azad, Ashfaqullah Khan and Ram Prasad Bismil. To fund their need to buy guns for the revolution, they decided to rob the money belonging to the erstwhile British Indian government and transported by the guard's compartment in trains.

On 9 August 1925, a group of 10 of them, including Keshab robbed a train at the railway station of Kakori, Uttar Pradesh. Though they escaped, they were soon arrested in a month. Keshab easily escaped from the arrests.

== See also ==
- Constitution of H.R.A.
- Wikisource:Constitution of Hindustan Republican Association
- Kakori Conspiracy
