= Hindustan Socialist Republican Association =

Indian revolution organization (1924–~1935 )

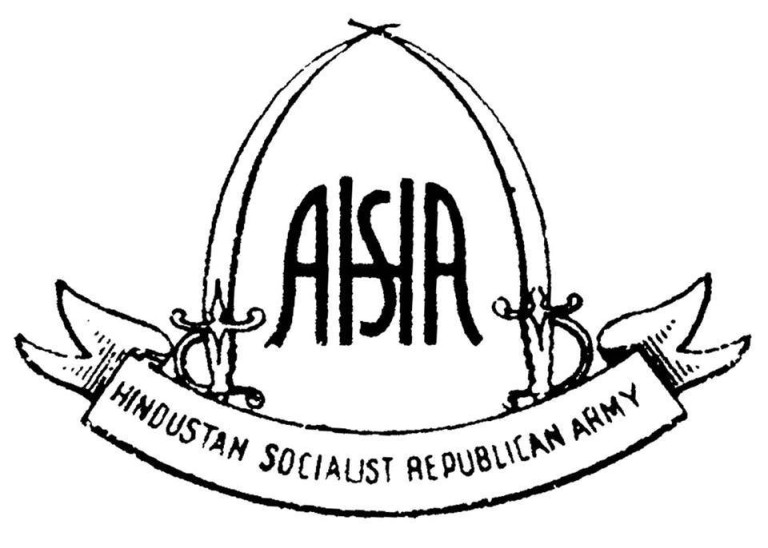
- Other name: Hindustan Republican Association; Hindustan Republican Army
- Founders: Yogendra Shukla; Ram Prasad Bismil; Ashfaqulla Khan; Sachindra Nath Bakshi; Jogesh Chandra Chatterjee
- Leaders: Chandra Shekhar Azad; Sachindra Nath Sanyal; Bhagat Singh
- Dates active: October 1924–1936
- Country: India
- Ideology: Indian independence Marxism; Revolutionary socialism Secularism; Anti-imperialism
- Political position: Far-left
- Part of: Revolutionary movement for Indian independence

Hindustan Socialist Republican Association (HSRA), previously known as the Hindustan Republican Army and Hindustan Republican Association (HRA), was a left-wing Indian revolutionary organization, founded by Sachindra Nath Sanyal. After changes in Bhagat Singh's ideology and the influence of the Russian Revolution, they held meetings in Feroz Shah Kotla Maidan (Currently known as Arun Jaitley Cricket Stadium) and added the word socialist to their name. Ram Prasad Bismil, Ashfaqulla Khan, Sachindra Bakshi, Sachindra Nath Sanyal and Jogesh Chandra Chatterjee were the leaders of the group at the time. HSRA's manifesto titled The Revolutionary and written constitution were produced as evidence in the Kakori conspiracy case of 1925.

== Origins ==
=== Background ===
The non-cooperation movement of 1919 had led to a large-scale mobilization of the Indian population against the British Raj. Although intended as a non-violent resistance movement, due to heightened tensions, and a brutal response by the British police forces, it had soon become violent. After the Chauri Chaura incident, where several police officers were locked in a police station, which was subsequently set on fire by demonstrators, Mahatma Gandhi suspended the movement to prevent the escalation of violence. This disillusioned a section of nationalists who felt the suspension was premature and unwarranted. Ram Prasad Bismil and his group of youth strongly opposed Gandhi in the 37th session of the Indian National Congress, held in Gaya, Bihar. The political vacuum created by the suspension led to the formation of revolutionary movements by the more radical amongst those who sought to overthrow British Raj.

=== Opposition of Gandhi in Gaya Congress ===
In February 1922, some agitating farmers were killed in Chauri Chaura by the police. Consequently, the police station of Chauri Chaura was attacked by the people and 22 policemen were burnt alive.

Without ascertaining the facts behind this incident, Mahatma Gandhi, declared an immediate stop to the Non-cooperation movement (he himself had given a call for it) without consulting any executive committee member of the Congress. Ram Prasad Bismil and his group of youth strongly opposed Gandhi in the Gaya Congress of 1922. When Gandhi refused to rescind his decision, the Indian National Congress was divided into two groups – one liberal and the other for rebellion. In January 1923, the liberal group formed a new Swaraj Party under the joint leadership of Motilal Nehru and Chittaranjan Das, and the youth group formed a revolutionary party under the leadership of Bismil.

=== Yellow Paper constitution ===
With the consent of Har Dayal, Bismil went to Allahabad where he drafted the constitution of the party in 1923 with the help of Sachindra Nath Sanyal and another revolutionary of Bengal, Jadugopal Mukherjee. The basic name and aims of the organisation were typed on a Yellow Paper and later on a subsequent Constitutional Committee Meeting was conducted on 3 October 1924 at Cawnpore in the United Provinces under Sanyal's chairmanship.

=== Sharing responsibility ===
This meeting decided the name of the party would be the Hindustan Republican Association (HRA). Bismil was declared the District Organiser for Shahjahanpur and chief of arms division, as well as provincial organiser of United Provinces. Sachindra Nath Sanyal became National Organiser and another senior member, Jogesh Chandra Chatterjee, was Coordinator of the Anushilan Samiti. After attending the meeting in Cawnpore, both Sanyal and Chatterjee left the United Province and proceeded to Bengal for further extension of the organisation.

The HRA established branches in Agra, Allahabad, Benares, Cawnpore, Lucknow, Saharanpur and Shahjahanpur. They also manufactured bombs in Calcutta – at Dakshineswar and Shovabazar and at Deoghar in Jharkhand (then Bihar province). The Calcutta workshops were discovered by the police in 1925 and those in Deoghar were found in 1927.

=== Publication of Revolutionary ===
Sanyal wrote a manifesto for the HRA entitled Revolutionary. This was distributed around large cities of North India on 1 January 1925. It proposed the overthrow of British colonial rule and its replacement with what it termed a Federal Republic of the United States of India. In addition, it sought universal suffrage and the socialist-oriented aim of the abolition of "all systems which make any kind of exploitation of man by man possible"

The policies of Gandhi were criticised and youths were called to join the organisation. The police were astonished to see the language used and sought its leader in Bengal. Sanyal had gone to despatch this pamphlet in bulk and was arrested in Bankura, West Bengal. Before Sanyal's arrest, Jogesh Chandra Chatterjee had also been caught by police at Howrah railway station of Calcutta, Bengal Presidency.

== Early activities ==
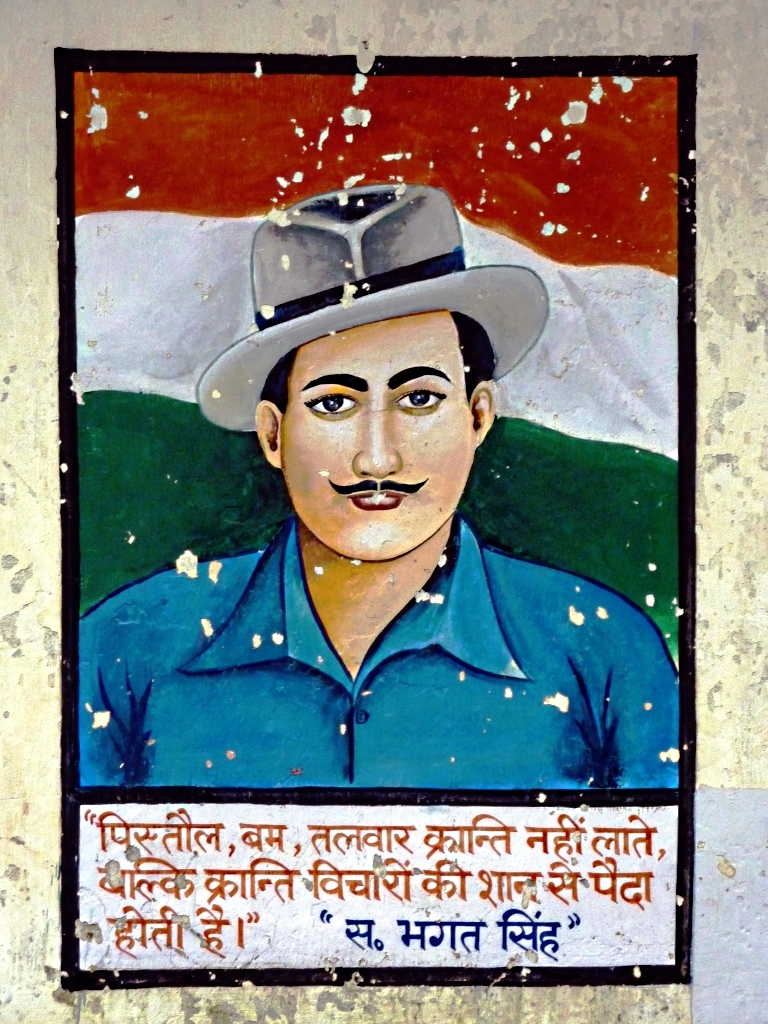
Wall painting of Bhagat Singh; Rewalsar, India, 2009

There were many early attempts at disruption and obtaining funds, such as the robbery of the houses of village officials at Dwarikapur and Bichpuri in 1922–23, but the Kakori train robbery was the most prominent of the early HRA efforts. The Kakori event occurred on 9 August 1925, when HRA members looted government money from a train around 10 miles (16 km) from Lucknow and accidentally killed a passenger in the process. Significant members of the HRA were arrested and tried for their involvement in that incident and others that had preceded it. The outcome was that four leaders – Ashfaqulla Khan, Ram Prasad Bismil, Roshan Singh and Rajendra Lahiri – were hanged in December 1927 and a further 16 were imprisoned for lengthy terms. The result of the trial, in which the HRA participants sang patriotic songs and displayed other forms of defiance, seriously damaged the leadership of the HRA and dealt a major blow to its activities. Many associated with the HRA who escaped trial found themselves placed under surveillance or detained for various reasons. Chandra Shekhar Azad was the only one of the principal leaders who managed to escape arrest, whereas Banwari Lal became an approver.

== Major activities ==
In 1928, the British government set up the Simon Commission, headed by Sir John Simon, to report on the political situation in India. Some Indian activist groups protested the commission because it did not include a single Indian in its membership, although by no means all did so. The effect was to unite various activist factions in opposition.

Responding to the rise in anti-colonial sentiment in 1928, the HRA became the Hindustan Socialist Republican Association, with the change of name probably being largely due to the influence of Bhagat Singh. Around the time of the Kakori robbery and the subsequent trial, various revolutionary groups had emerged in places such as Bengal, Bihar, and Punjab. These groups and the HRA met at Feroz Shah Kotla, in Delhi, on 8–9 September 1928, and from this emerged the HSRA. (Note: The revolutionary group from Bengal did not formally associate itself with the HSRA in 1928 but did provide Jatindra Nath Das to give advice on explosives. The Bengal group did not accept the socio-economic aspects of revolution proposed by the other groups and preferred to see it purely in terms of nationalism.) The socialist leanings voiced in the earlier HRA manifesto had gradually moved more towards Marxism and the HSRA spoke of a revolution involving a struggle by the masses to establish "the dictatorship of the proletariat" and the banishment of "parasites from the seat of political power". It saw itself as being at the forefront of this revolution, spreading the word and acting as the armed section of the masses. Its ideals were apparent in other movements elsewhere at that time, including incidents of communist-inspired industrial action by workers and the rural Peasant movement. At the request of Bhagat Singh, the newly named HSRA resolved to bomb members of the Simon Commission and also to cease robbing rich people, the latter decision reflected the realisation that the Kakori conspirators had suffered most from the evidence given by such people. At that time, the HRA was being transformed into the HSRA and it was decided that the new organization would work in cooperation with the Communist International.

The HSRA's manifesto, titled Philosophy of the Bomb was written by Bhagwati Charan Vohra.

== Killing of John P. Saunders ==
When the Simon Commission visited Lahore on 30 October 1928, Lala Lajpat Rai led a peaceful protest against the commission. The police responded with violence, with the Superintendent of Police, James Alexander Scott, ordering his men to lathi charge the protesters. Rai was beaten but addressed a meeting later. He died on 17 November 1928, perhaps in part because of his injuries although this is uncertain. Historian Neeti Nair says "His death was widely attributed to the mental if not physical shock he had suffered." When the matter of Lala Lajpat Rai's death was raised in the Parliament of the United Kingdom, the government denied any causal role. Bhagat Singh vowed to take revenge, and joined other revolutionaries, Shivaram Rajguru, Jai Gopal, Sukhdev Thapar and Chandra Shekhar Azad, in a plot to kill Scott. However, in a case of mistaken identity, Singh was signalled to shoot on the appearance of John P. Saunders, an Assistant superintendent. He was shot by Rajguru and Singh while leaving the District Police Headquarters in Lahore on 17 December 1928. Chanan Singh, a Head Constable who was chasing them, was killed by Azad's covering fire.

This case of mistaken identity did not stop Singh and his fellow-members of the HSRA from claiming that retribution had been exacted. The next day the HSRA acknowledged the assassination by putting up posters in Lahore that read

J. P. Saunders is dead; Lala Lajpat Rai is avenged. ... In this man has died an agent of the British authority in India. ... Sorry for the bloodshed of the human being, but the sacrifice of individuals at the altar of revolution ... is inevitable.

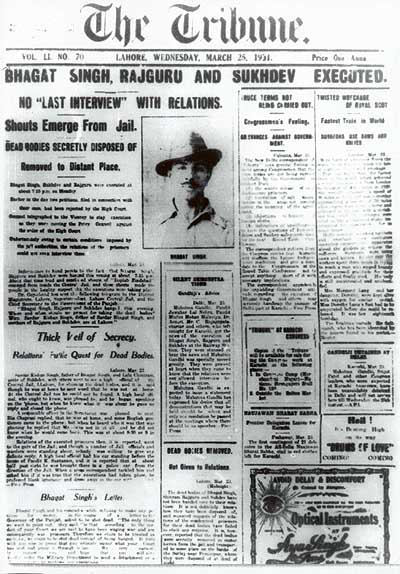
Front page of the Tribune (25 March 1931) published from Lahore, reporting the execution of Singh, Sukhdev & Rajguru

The perpetrators of the Saunders murder having eluded capture and gone into hiding, the next major action by the HSRA was the bombing of the Central Legislative Assembly in Delhi on 8 April 1929. This was a provocative propaganda exercise, intended to highlight the aims of the HSRA and timed as a protest against the introduction of the Public Safety Bill and the Trade Disputes Bill, both of which had been drafted in an attempt to counter the effects of communist activities and trade unionism

Bhagat Singh and Batukeshwar Dutt threw bombs at the empty benches, being careful to ensure that there were no casualties in order to highlight the propaganda nature of their action. They made no attempt to escape and courted arrest while shouting Inquilab Zindabad (Long Live the Revolution), Vande Mataram (Hail to the motherland) and Samrajyavad Murdabad' (Down with Imperialism). Their rationale for the bombing was explained in a leaflet titled "To Make the Deaf Hear" (paraphrasing the words of Édouard Vaillant). This leaflet was also thrown in the assembly and was reproduced the next day in the Hindustan Times. On 15 April 1929, police raided the HSRA's bomb factory in Lahore and arrested Pandit Kishori Lal, Sukhdev and Jai Gopal. The Assembly Bomb case and the Saunders murder case trial followed and Singh, Sukhdev and Rajguru were hanged on 23 March 1931 for their involvement.

== Later activities ==
In December 1929, the HSRA bombed the special train of Lord Irwin. The Viceroy escaped unhurt. Later, the Lahore faction of the HSRA broke away and formed the Atishi Chakar (The Ring of Fire) party under the leadership of Hans Raj Vohra. They carried out a series of bombings across Punjab in June 1929. On 21 January 1929, Bhagat Singh and his fellow comrades, who were accused in the Lahore Conspiracy Case, appeared in court wearing red scarves. As soon as the magistrate took his chair, they raised slogans such as "Long Live Socialist revolution", "Long Live Communist International", "Long Live People" "Lenin's Name Will Never Die", and "Down with Imperialism." On 1 September 1929, the Rawalpindi faction made a failed attempt to burgle the Office of the Controller of Military Accounts. During this period, the leading members of the HSRA were Chandra Shekhar Azad, Yashpal, Bhagwati Charan Vohra and Kailash Pati. In July 1929, the HSRA robbed the Gadodia stores in New Delhi and carried away 14,000 rupees. This money was later used to fund a bomb factory. In December 1929, an attempt was made to assassinate the Governor of Punjab, wounded him in the arm.

== Decline ==
By 1930, most of the HSRA's main leaders were either dead or in prison. Kailash Pati was arrested in October 1929 and turned an approver (witness for the prosecution). On 27 February 1931, Chandra Shekhar Azad shot himself in the head during a gunfight with the Allahabad Police in a famous incident of Alfred Park. Bhagat Singh, Sukhdev Thapar, and Shivaram Rajguru were hanged on 23 March 1931. After Azad's death, there was no central leader to unite the revolutionaries and regional differences increased. The organisation split into various regional groups and they carried out bombings and attacks on British officials in India without any central coordination. In December 1930, another attempt was made to revive the HSRA at a meeting in Meerut. However, this attempt failed with the arrests of Yashpal and Daryao Singh in 1931. This effectively ended the HSRA as a united organisation though the various regional factions kept up their armed struggle until 1935.

== Criticism ==
The association's methods were diametrically opposite to those of Mahatma Gandhi's nonviolent resistance movement. The revolutionaries and their methods were severely criticized by Mahatma Gandhi. Responding to the attack on Lord Irwin's train, Mahatma Gandhi wrote a harsh critique of the HSRA titled "The Cult of the Bomb" (Young India, 2 January 1929). In it, he declared that bomb-throwing was nothing but "froth coming to the surface in an agitated liquid". He condemned the HSRA and its actions as "cowards" and "dastardly". According to Mahatma Gandhi, the HSRA's violent struggle had its hazards. The violence led to more reprisals and suffering. Also, it would turn inward as "it was an easy natural step" from "violence done to the foreign ruler" to "violence to our own people". The HSRA responded to this criticism with its own manifesto "The Philosophy of the Bomb", in which they defended their violent methods as being complementary to Gandhi's nonviolent methods.

== Prominent members ==
Name	Involved in	Outcome
Chandra Shekhar Azad	Kakori conspiracy, John P. Saunders assassination (1927)	Absconded in the Kakori Conspiracy Case, while living underground he re-organized the HSRA and shot himself dead in a shoot-out with police at Allahabad on 27 February 1931.
Sachindra Nath Bakshi	Kakori conspiracy	Sentenced to life imprisonment in Kakori case; released in 1936 and became active in Congress but left the party after independence. He was elected as the MLA on Jan Sangh Party ticket
Suresh Chandra Bhattacharya	Kakori conspiracy	Sentenced to ten years' rigorous imprisonment in Kakori case
Ram Prasad Bismil	Mainpuri conspiracy (1917) and Kakori conspiracy	Absconded in Mainpuri case; Sentenced to death in Kakori case. Hanged in 1926 at Gorakhpur Central Jail
Jogesh Chandra Chatterjee	Kakori conspiracy	Sentenced to life imprisonment in Kakori case; became a Member of Parliament after independence
Pranawesh Chatterjee	Kakori conspiracy	Sentenced to four years' rigorous imprisonment in Kakori case
Vishnu Sharan Dublish	Kakori conspiracy	Sentenced to ten years' rigorous imprisonment in Kakori conspiracy which was converted later into a life sentence after Naini Jail Case. Joined Indian National Congress, freedom movement activities in Western Uttar Pradesh, became a member of parliament.
Manmath Nath Gupta	Kakori conspiracy	Sentenced to 14 years' rigorous imprisonment in Kakori case; later became a journalist/writer; died in 1999 on the day of Deepavali.
Govind Charan Kar	Kakori conspiracy	Sentenced to life in Kakori case.
Ashfaqulla Khan	Kakori conspiracy	Sentenced to death in Kakori case. Hanged in 1926 at Faizabad Jail.
Prem Krishna Khanna	Kakori conspiracy	Sentenced to five years' rigorous imprisonment in Kakori case. He became a Member of Parliament from Shahjahanpur in 1961 and 1966.
Ram Krishna Khatri	Kakori conspiracy	Sentenced to ten years' rigorous imprisonment in Kakori case.
Rajendra Nath Lahiri	Kakori conspiracy	Sentenced to death in Kakori case. Hanged in 1926 at Gonda Jail.
Banwari Lal	Kakori conspiracy	Sentenced to two years' even after being an approver in the Kakori case.
Mukundi Lal	Mainpuri conspiracy (1917) and Kakori conspiracy	Sentenced to seven years' rigorous imprisonment in Mainpuri and life in Kakori conspiracy case; died in October 1981.
Ram Nath Pandey	Kakori conspiracy	Sentenced to three years' rigorous imprisonment in Kakori case.
Bhupendra Nath Sanyal	Kakori conspiracy	Sentenced to five years' rigorous imprisonment in Kakori case
Sachindra Nath Sanyal	Kakori conspiracy	Sentenced to life imprisonment in Andaman Cellular Jail; died of tuberculosis at Bhowali TB sanatorium in 1942.
Thakur Roshan Singh	Kakori conspiracy	Sentenced to death in Kakori case. Hanged in 1926 at Allahabad Jail.
Raj Kumar Sinha	Kakori conspiracy	Sentenced to ten years' rigorous imprisonment in Kakori case.
Ram Dulare Trivedi	Kakori conspiracy	Sentenced to five years' rigorous imprisonment in Kakori case.
Ajoy Ghosh	Lahore Conspiracy Case trial	He was arrested and latter imprisoned after Lahore Conspiracy Case trial in 1928 but released due to lack of evidence. Later, he joined Communist Party of India and become general secretary of CPI in 1950.

== End time and Dissolution ==
After the death of Bhagat Singh and Chandra Shekhar Azad, another associate Udham Singh operated the HSRA from London. HSRA was dissolved in 1940 when Udham was hanged.

== Legacy ==
A bomb factory and hideout located in Turi Bazaar, Firozpur, has been declared as a national monument by the Government of Punjab.

== See also ==
- Sushila Didi
- Ashfaqulla Khan
- Delhi Conspiracy Commission
- Naujawan Bharat Sabha
- Revolutionary movement for Indian independence
- Workers and Peasants Party
