= Prem Krishna Khanna =

Indian revolutionary, Member of Parliament (1894–1993)

Prem Kishan Khanna
- Born: 2 January 1894; Lahore, Punjab, British India
- Died: 3 August 1993 (aged 99); Shahjahanpur, Uttar Pradesh, India
- Occupation: Freedom fighter
- Organization: Hindustan Republican Association
- Movement: Indian Independence Movement

Prem Kishan Khanna (2 January 1894 – 3 August 1993) was an Indian freedom fighter and active member of the Hindustan Republican Association from Shahjahanpur, Uttar Pradesh. Khanna worked as a contractor for the Indian Railways and was a close associate of the noted revolutionary Ram Prasad Bismil.

Khanna had a license to own a Mauser pistol, which was occasionally used by Bismil for his various revolutionary actions. He was arrested in the Kakori conspiracy case against the British Empire, prosecuted, and sentenced to five years of rigorous imprisonment for giving his arms license to Bismil, who used it to purchase 150 cartridges on his behalf, which constituted a criminal offense. He was released from jail in 1932. Later in life, he remained a bachelor and continued to work for Indian Independence.

He was elected as Member of Parliament from the Shahjahanpur constituency in 1962 and 1967.

He died on 3 August 1993 in a district hospital of Shahjahanpur.

== Birth ==
Prem Kishan Khanna was born to Raibahadur Ram Kishan Khanna on 2 February 1894 in Lahore which is now in modern-day Pakistan. His grandfather, Dr. Har Narayan Khanna, was a Civil Surgeon in the Western Punjab of British India. Khanna's father served as the Chief Divisional Engineer for British Indian Railways, with headquarters in Shahjahanpur, a historic city in what was then known as the United Province of Agra and Audh, now Uttar Pradesh. At the time of Khanna's birth, his father was posted in Lahore, overseeing railway extensions in the state of Punjab, Pakistan. Khanna's father was honored with the title of Raibahadur by the British government for his honesty in his work and the diligent discharge of his duties.

== Work as a contractor ==
As Khanna grew up, instead of reading his course books, he started reading books pertaining to the history of different revolutions. Since his father Raibahadur Khanna had good relations with the British Authorities, Khanna was able to obtain a contractorship for Indian Railways construction.

== Mauser pistol ==
Khanna's father was very wealthy and he was the eldest child in the family and had 2 younger brothers Daya Kishan Khanna and Sri Kishan Khanna. His father built a grand Kothi in Shahjahanpur (U.P.), and Khanna took up residence there and began looking after the contracting work of the railways. Since Khanna's line of work came with considerable risk from thieves and bandits, he obtained an arms license for his personal safety. Prem Kishan purchased a Mauser pistol and kept it for his self-protection.

== Contact with Ram Prasad Bismil ==
Ram Prasad Bismil was always in search of firearms and ammunition and he contacted Khanna for his support. Khanna could purchase 50 cartridges at a time, so he gave his license to Bismil to purchase ammunition on his behalf, and a close relationship developed between them. Khanna and Bismil occasionally visited the engineers' colony for their help and most of the engineers helped them.

== Delhi, Ahmedabad and Gaya Congress ==
In 1918, Khanna participated in the Delhi Congress as a volunteer of "Shahjahanpur Seva Samiti". Bismil was his group leader. Khanna, along with other volunteers were selling a book entitled "Amrika Kaise Swadhin Hua?" (en. How America Became Independent?) outside the Congress Camp. The police raided the camp but the unsold books were removed from the camp by Bismil immediately and nobody was arrested.

Likewise, Khanna also participated in the 1921 Ahmedabad Congress where the proposal of "Poorn Swaraj" was placed before the delegates. When Maulana Hasrat Mohani spoke in favour of this proposal and Mohandas K. Gandhi opposed it, Khanna, Ashfaq and Bismil stood up in favour of Mohani and the audience became totally against Gandhi. The proposal was accepted and Non-Cooperation Movement was announced to be moved throughout the country under the leadership of Gandhi.

When Gandhi withdrew from the movement after Chauri Chaura incident, Khanna started agitation against him along with Ram Prasad Bismil. He also went to Gaya with his team of young volunteers and condemned the decisions of Gandhi in the Congress. When Subhas Chandra Bose and Pandit Jawahar Lal Nehru supported their stand Gandhi wrote a very strong letter to Nehru not to support these miscreant elements in the Indian National Congress.

== Switch to HRA ==
Although Khanna was a dedicated volunteer to Congress, he still assisted Bismil in the formation of a revolutionary party within Shahjahanpur itself. Khanna, Bismil Ashfaq and Roshan, all from Shahjahanpur, Seth Damodar Swaroop from Bareilly, Manmath Nath Gupta, Rajendra Nath Lahiri and Chandra Shekhar Azad from Benaras all joined and a revolutionary party was declared, which was later named the Hindustan Republican Association. Khanna was a main figure for providing arms and ammunition to this new party.

== Role in Kakori Conspiracy ==
After the Kakori train robbery, the house of Khanna was searched by Police Sub Inspector Fasahat Husain. A licensed Mauser Pistol and a few cartridges were found in this search, and they were seized by the police, along with his arms licence. The approver Banarasi Lal gave the clue to C.I.D. Inspector Mr Horten who enquired after the sales registers of M/s Vishwas and Co, an arms dealer of Cownpore and found that a total of 150 cartridges were purchased between 14 February 1924 to 5 January 1925 on his licence. In one entry, dated 7 August 1924, the forged signatures of P.K. Khanna were signed by R.P. Bismil, which was proven by forensic examination of the handwriting.

In order to save Khanna from a more severe punishment, Bismil changed his statement and affirmed under oath during his trial that the weapon and licence were both obtained by theft from one of Khanna's servants. Khanna was prosecuted and sentenced to five years rigorous imprisonment in the Kakori Conspiracy Case.

== Helping Congress ==
Police tried to use Khanna as a witness against Bismil but he refused to testify and accepted his sentence. Despite opposition from his father, Khanna helped the Congress in further direct actions upon his release from imprisonment under the orders of his leader, Ram Prasad Bismil.

He remained with the Congress and was elected M.P. on the party ticket and tried to keep the party true to its revolutionary roots until his death.

== Projects in Shahjahanpur ==
Under the inspiration and advice of his close associate Ram Prasad Bismil, Khanna devoted his whole life to the service of the people and established half a dozen institutions in the rural sector of his home district Shahjahanpur viz;

1. Kakori Shaheed Inter College, Jalalabad, District Shahjahanpur,
2. Kakori Shaheed Higher Secondary School, Miranpur Katra, District Shahjahanpur,
3. Kakori Shaheed Higher Secondary School, Khutar, District Shahjahanpur,
4. Kakori Shaheed Krishi Prashikshan Farm, Village Chhivkuti, District Shahjahanpur,
5. Kakori Shaheed Krishi Prashikshan Farm, Village Mahmoodpur Shaijania, District Shahjahanpur,
6. Kakori Shaheed Krishi Prashikshan Farm, Village Marauri, District Shahjahanpur,

After Khanna's death the name of Kakori Shaheed Inter College, Jalalabad was changed to "Prem Kishan Khanna Government College". Kakori Shaheed Higher Secondary School Miranpur Katra is now known as "Kakori Shaheed Inter College". It is known as the best Higher Secondary School founded by Khanna.

== His other projects ==
Khanna had a great deal of ancestral property and died as a bachelor. He established the "Shahid-E-Azam Pandit Ram Prasad Bismil Memorial Trust" and donated his whole property through a registered will. He had two other dream projects;

1. "Shahid-E-Azam Pandit Ram Prasad Bismil Memorial" and
2. "Kakori Shahid Degree College" in Shahjahanpur.

Kakori is the place where ten revolutionaries stopped a train and looted the British government's treasury which was being transported in the guard's cabin. A memorial to these revolutionaries has been established in this town.

The ancestral house of Pandit Ram Prasad Bismil in Khirni Bag Mohalla of Shahjahanpur is in the care of a person who is still residing there, but neither India's central government nor U.P.'s state government have attempted to declare it a National Archival Property.

After the death of Khanna, a government degree college has been established in his name in Shahjahanpur. This "Prem Kishan Khanna Government Degree College" is affiliated to Mahatma Jyotiba Phule Rohilkhand University, Bareilly. The mission of the college is to develop outstanding managerial talent capable of providing enlightened and effective leadership. The college offers a Bachelor of Arts Degree Course.

== Lived for the welfare of freedom fighters ==
Khanna did a lot of work for the welfare of what he considered to be "freedom fighters" while elected to the Congress. He was elected as M.L.A. consecutively two times and thereafter as M.P. also for two terms. He remained president of Uttar Pradesh Swatantrata Senani Sangathan and Uttar Pradesh Swatantrata Senani Kalyan Parishad.

Khanna died on 3 August 1993 in the District Hospital Shahjahanpur just at age 99
