= Banwari Lal (revolutionary) =

Indian Revolutionary

Banwari Lal was a member of Hindustan Republican Association, who participated in the Kakori train robbery, carried out in August 1925 to buy ammunition for revolutionary activities and protests against British rule in India. He lived in Shahjahanpur, in the present-day state of Uttar Pradesh, India. He became an approver in the subsequent court case concerning that robbery for monetary gains and to evade punishment.

A member of the Hindustan Republican Association (later known as the Hindustan Socialist Republican Association), Banwari Lal was arrested at Raibareli and sent to Lucknow jail. He became an approver (traitor for HRA), then also he was sentenced for five years imprisonment.

Banwari name was not included in the autobiography of Ram Prasad Bismil, as Bismil feared that revealing it could bring serious consequences for lal and his family.
