= Sushila Didi =

Indian revolutionary

Didi Sushila Mohan
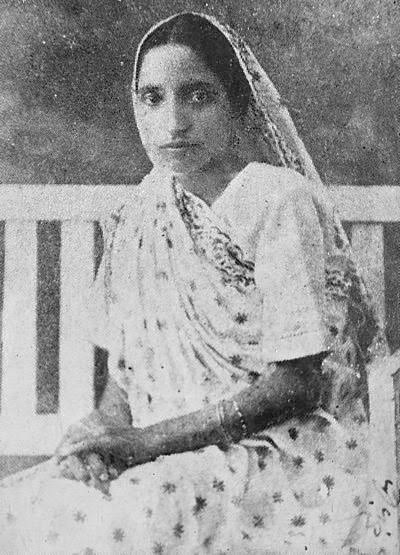
- Sushila Didi
- Born: Sushila Mohan; 5 March 1905; Punjab province, British India
- Died: 13 January 1963 (aged 57); Punjab, India
- Other name: Sushila Didi
- Citizenship: Indian
- Education: Arya Women college, Jalandhar
- Era: British era
- Movement: Indian Independence Movement

Sushila Mohan popularly known as Sushila Didi, (5 March 1905 – 13 January 1963) was a major figure in India's revolutionary freedom struggle movement.

== Early life ==
She was born to an army doctor in the Punjab province of colonial India and did her studies from the Arya women's college in Jalandhar. She was known for writing nationalist poems and started participating in nationalist politics during her college life.

== History ==
When Sushila Didi was a college student, the execution by hanging of Indian freedom fighters raised nationalism in her. In 1926, she joined the Hindustan Socialist Republican Association to contribute to India's freedom fight. When Bhagat Singh and Batukeshwar Dutt were caught after throwing a bomb on the assembly, Sushila didi and Durga Bhabhi together helped the other revolutionaries to escape. On 1 October 1931, she along with others, shot European Sergeant Taylor and his wife. To defend the case for the prisoners, she donated 10 tola of gold which was kept by his late mother for the purpose of her marriage. Wearing a masculine garb, she participated in the freedom movement and after joining Bal Gangadhar Tilak 's extremist party. Later she was arrested and sent to jail.
