= Dil Shahjahanpuri =

Poet

Dil Shahjahanpuri (1875–1959), was the takhallus of Zameer Hasan Khan, the renowned Urdu ghazal writer, who was born in Shahjahanpur, North Western Provinces, British India in the year 1875. He was a disciple of the famous Urdu poet, Amir Meenai. Thus far, two collections of his ghazals have been published; they are – Naghma e Dil and Tarana e Dil. Dil Shahjahanpuri, hayat aur adabi khidmat by Izhar Sahbai published in 1988 by Taqsimkar, Danish Mahall, Lucknow, (DLC)88905477 is the only known exhaustive work on the life and literary contribution of this poet. He died in Shahjahanpur in 1959.
