= Kakori conspiracy =

1925 train robbery in Kakori, India

The Kakori Train Action was a train robbery that took place at Kakori, a village near Lucknow, on 9 August 1925, during the Indian independence movement against the British Raj in India. It was organised by the Indian revolutionaries of the Hindustan Socialist Republican Association (HSRA).

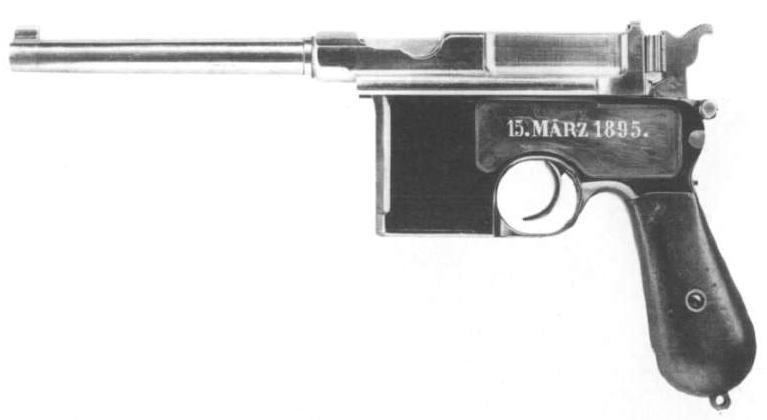
Photo showing the German-made Mauser C96 pistol. At least four Mauser pistols were used by the Indian revolutionaries.

The action was conceived by Ram Prasad Bismil and Ashfaqulla Khan who were members of the Hindustan Republican Association (HRA), which later became the Hindustan Socialist Republican Association. The HRA was established to carry out revolutionary activities against the British Raj with the objective of achieving independence. Since the organisation needed money for the purchase of weaponry, Bismil and his party made a plan to rob a train on the Saharanpur railway lines. The robbery plan was executed by Bismil, Khan, Rajendra Lahiri, Chandra Shekhar Azad, Sachindra Bakshi, Keshab Chakravarthy, Manmath Nath Gupta, Mukundi Lal, Murari Lal Khanna, Vishnu Sharan Dublish and Banwari Lal. One passenger was killed.

== Action ==
On 9 August 1925, the Number 8 Down Train was travelling from Shahjahanpur to Lucknow. When it passed Kakori, one of the revolutionaries, Rajendra Lahiri, pulled the emergency chain to stop the train, and subsequently, the other revolutionaries overpowered the guard. It is believed that they looted that specific train because it was carrying tax money in money bags which were en route to the British government treasury.They looted only these bags (which were present in the guard's cabin and contained about ₹8000 (Note: According to one estimate ₹ 4,679, one aana and 6 pai was looted)) and escaped to Lucknow. The objectives of this robbery were to:

- Fund the HRA with money that the British administration had taxed from Indians.
- Protest against the British administration's excessive tax collection from Indians.
- Garner public attention by creating a positive image of the HRA among Indians.

One lawyer, Ahmad Ali, who was a passenger, had got down to see his wife in the women's compartment and was killed by a bullet fired by Manmath Nath Gupta. This escalated the case to manslaughter. Following the incident, the British administration started an intense manhunt and arrested several of the revolutionaries who were members or part of the HRA. Their leader, Ram Prasad Bismil was arrested in Shahjahanpur on 26 October 1925 and Ashfaqulla Khan was arrested on 7 December 1926 in Delhi.

== Arrests ==
Forty people were arrested from all over India. Their names (with the place and date of arrest) are:

- From Agra
  - Chandra Dhar Johri – 19 November 1925 (1)
  - Chandra Bhal Johri – 15 November 1925 (2)
- From Allahabad
  - Shitala Sahai – 2 November 1925 (3)
  - Jyoti Shankar Dixit – 11 November 1925 (4)
  - Bhupendra Nath Sanyal – 16 December 1925 (5)
- From Orai
  - Veer Bhadra Tiwari – 31 October 1925 (6)
- From Benares
  - Manmath Nath Gupta – 26 September 1925 (7)
  - Damodar Swarup Seth – 28 September 1925 (8)
  - Ram Nath Pandey – 27 September 1925 (9)
  - Dev Dutt Bhattacharya – 21 October 1925 (10)
  - Indra Vikram Singh – 30 September 1925 (11)
  - Mukundi Lal – 17 January 1926 (12)
- From Bengal
  - Sachindra Nath Sanyal – 10 December 1925 (13)
  - Jogesh Chandra Chatterjee – 21 December 1925 (14)
  - Rajendra Lahiri – 10 January 1926 (15)
  - Sharat Chandra Guha – 5 October 1925 (16)
  - Kali Das Bose – 2 November 1925 (17)
- From Etah
  - Babu Ram Verma – 10 November 1925 (18)
- From Hardoi
  - Bhairon Singh – 11 November 1925 (19)
- From Jabalpur
  - Pranawesh Chatterjee – 11 December 1925 (20)
- From Kanpur
  - Ram Dulare Trivedi – 26 September 1925 (21)
  - Gopi Mohan – 25 October 1925 (22)
  - Raj Kumar Sinha – 31 October 1925 (23)
  - Suresh Chandra Bhattacharya – 26 September 1925 (24)
- From Lahore
  - Mohan Lal Gautam – 18 November 1925 (25)
- From Lakhimpur
  - Harnam Sundarlal – 7 November 1925 (26)
- From Lucknow
  - Govind Charan Kar – 26 September 1925 (27)
  - Sachindranath Biswas – 6 October 1925 (28)
- From Meerut
  - Vishnu Sharan Dublish – 26 September 1925 (29)
- From Pune
  - Ram Krishna Khatri – 18 October 1925 (30)
- From Raebareli
  - Banwari Lal – 15 December 1925 (31)
- From Shahjahanpur
  - Ram Prasad Bismil – 26 October 1925 (32)
  - Banarsi Lal – 26 September 1925 (33)
  - Lala Hargovind – 26 September 1925 (34)
  - Prem Krishna Khanna – 26 September 1925 (35)
  - Indubhushan Mitra – 30 September 1925 (36)
  - Thakur Roshan Singh – 26 September 1925 (37)
  - Ram Dutt Shukla – 3 October 1925 (38)
  - Madan Lal – 10 October 1925 (39)
  - Ram Ratna Shukla – 11 October 1925 (40)

Arrested later:

- From Delhi
  - Ashfaqulla Khan – 7 December 1926
- From Pratapgarh
  - Sachindranath Bakshi – September 1926

Of the above, Sachindranath Sanyal, Rajendra Lahiri and Jogesh Chandra Chatterjee had already been arrested in Bengal. Lahiri was prosecuted in the Dakshineshwar bombings case, while Ashfaqullah Khan and Sachindranath Bakshi were arrested later when the main Kakori case was over, a supplementary case was lodged against both of them and they were prosecuted in the same manner. Chandrashekhar Azad, along with Keshab Chakravarty and Murari Lal Gupta, was the only participant not to have been arrested.

== Kakori trial ==
Bismil and some others were charged with various offences, including robbery and murder. Fourteen people were released due to a lack of evidence. Two of the accused – Ashfaqulla Khan and Sachindranath Bakshi were captured after the trial. Chandra Shekhar Azad reorganised the HRA in 1928 and operated it until his death on 27 February 1931.

Charges filed against the three accused were later dropped. Damodar Swarup Seth was discharged due to illness, while Veer Bhadra Tiwari and Jyoti Shankar Dixit were suspected of providing information to the authorities. Two other individuals – Banarsi Lal and Indubhushan Mitra came to be approvers in return for a lenient sentence.

== Court's proceedings ==
Charges against 19 of the accused were withdrawn (2 had become approvers, while 17 people had been released). The trial against the remaining 21 began on 1 May 1926 at the Special Sessions Court of Justice Archibald Hamilton. Abbas Salim Khan, Banwari Lal Bhargava, Gyan Chatterjee and Mohammad Ayuf were the assessors of the case. Of the 21 accused, two people namely Sachindranath Biswas and Lala Hargovind were released due to lack of evidence, while Gopi Mohan became an approver.

The court had appointed Jagat Narain Mulla as a public prosecutor knowingly; he had a prejudice against Ram Prasad Bismil since 1916, when Bismil led the grand procession of Bal Gangadhar Tilak at Lucknow. He had also been the public prosecutor in the Mainpuri conspiracy case of 1918.

The government officers had also bribed many of the accused to become approvers. The trials were mainly based on the statements given by Banwari Lal who had met the revolutionaries and was also involved in the planning the robbery activities taken up by the group in Bamrauli (25 December 1924), Bichpuri (9 March 1925) and Dwarikapur (24 May 1925). Therefore, his statement was used as the main piece of evidence to plead the HRA members guilty.

The judgement of the case trials at the Sessions Court was pronounced on 6 April 1927, which is as follows —

Ram Prasad Bismil, Roshan Singh and Rajendra Nath Lahiri were sentenced to death. Sachindranath Sanyal was given life imprisonment. Manmathnath Gupta was sentenced to 14 years' imprisonment. Jogesh Chandra Chatterjee, Govind Charan Kar, Raj Kumar Sinha, Ram Krishna Khatri and Mukundi Lal were sentenced to 10 years' imprisonment, while Suresh Chandra Bhattacharya and Vishnu Sharan Dublish were given 7 years' imprisonment. Bhupendra Nath Sanyal, Ram Dulare Trivedi, Prem Krishna Khanna and Pranawesh Chatterjee were sentenced to imprisonment for 5 years' and the least punishment (3 years' imprisonment) was given to Ram Nath Pandey and Banwari Lal.

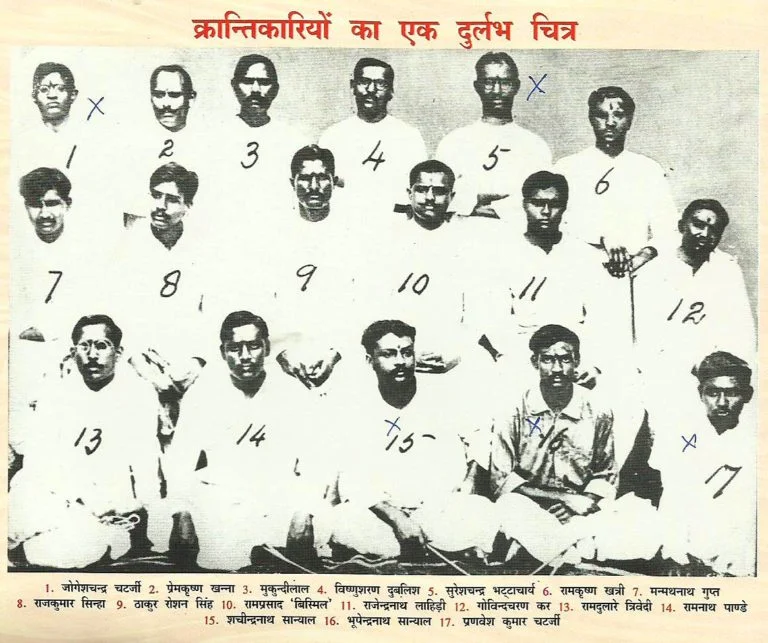
A group photograph, which showcases all of the Kakori Train Action accused.

=== Final verdict ===
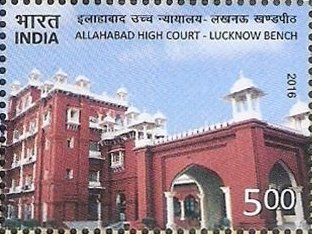
The building, which housed the Chief Court of Oudh, now functions as the Lucknow bench of the Allahabad High Court.

Following the arrest of Ashfaqulla Khan, the police interrogated him to try to gain supplementary evidence against his accomplices but he refused. Another supplementary case was filed against Ashfaqulla Khan and Sachindranath Bakshi at the court of Special Sessions Judge John Reginald William Bennett. An appeal was filed at the then Chief Court of Oudh (now Allahabad High Court – Lucknow Bench) on 18 July 1927. The case trials started the next day. The judgement of the trial was pronounced a month later on 22 August.

The punishments awarded were as follows:

- Death sentence: Ram Prasad Bismil, Roshan Singh, Rajendra Lahiri and Ashfaqulla Khan
- Deportation to Kala Pani (Port Blair Cellular Jail): Sachindra Nath Sanyal, Sachindra Bakshi, Govind Charan Kar, Jogesh Chandra Chatterjee, Vishnu Sharan Dublish and Mukundi Lal
- 14 years' imprisonment: Manmath Nath Gupta
- 10 years' imprisonment: Raj Kumar Sinha, Ram Krishna Khatri and Suresh Chandra Bhattacharya
- 5 years' imprisonment: Bhupendranath Sanyal, Prem Krishna Khanna, Banwari Lal and Ram Dulare Trivedi
- 4 years' imprisonment: Pranawesh Chatterjee
- 3 years' imprisonment: Ram Nath Pandey

== Hunger strike in the jail ==
After the court gave the judgement of the main Kakori Action Case on 6 April 1927, a group photograph was taken and all the accused were sent to the different jails of the United Provinces. In the prisons, they were asked to wear jail uniforms like the other prisoners which led to immediate protests and hunger strikes. The revolutionaries argued that since they had been charged with offences against the British rule (and supposedly overturning the British Raj), they should be treated as political prisoners and thus should possess the rights and amenities provided to political prisoners.

The details of their hunger strike are listed below:

Name of the prisoner	Name of the Jail	Days of hunger strike
Ram Prasad Bismil	Gorakhpur Central Jail	4 days (from 7 April 1927 to 11 April 1927)
Roshan Singh	Allahabad Jail	6 days (from 7 April 1927 to 13 April 1927)
Ram Nath Pandey	Raebareli District Jail	11 days (from 7 April 1927 to 18 April 1927)
Prem Krishna Khanna	Dehradun District Jail	16 days (from 7 April 1927 to 23 April 1927)
Suresh Chandra Bhattacharya	Agra Central Jail	19 days (from 7 April 1927 to 26 April 1927)
Ram Krishna Khatri	Agra Central Jail	32 days (from 7 April 1927 to 9 May 1927)
Mukundi Lal	Bareilly Central Jail	32 days (from 7 April 1927 t0 9 May 1927)
Raj Kumar Sinha	Bareilly Central Jail	38 days (from 7 April 1927 to 15 May 1927)
Jogesh Chandra Chatterjee	Fatehgarh Jail	41 days (from 7 April 1927 to 18 May 1927)
Ram Dulare Trivedi	Fatehgarh Jail	41 days (from 7 April 1927 to 18 May 1927)
Govind Charan Kar	Fatehgarh Jail	41 days (from 7 April 1927 to 18 May 1927)
Manmath Nath Gupta	Naini Allahabad Jail	45 days (from 7 April 1927 to 22 May 1927)
Vishnu Sharan Dublish	Naini Allahabad Jail	45 days (from 7 April 1927 to 22 May 1927)

== Defense committee ==
The legal defence for the arrested revolutionaries was provided by Govind Ballabh Pant, Mohanlal Saksena, Chandra Bhanu Gupta, Ajit Prasad Jain, Gopi Nath Srivastava, R. M. Bahadurji, B. K. Chaudhury, Nirmal Chandra Chaturvedi and Kripa Shankar Hajela. Nirmal Chandra Chaturvedi sought the assistance of his father Chaubey Mukta Prasad to arrange financial assistance to the families of those interned.

Among the political figures who came out in support of those arrested for the Kakori Train Action were: Motilal Nehru, Madan Mohan Malaviya, Muhammad Ali Jinnah, Lala Lajpat Rai, Jawaharlal Nehru, Ganesh Shankar Vidyarthi, Shiv Prasad Gupta, Sri Prakasa and Narendra Deva.

== Reaction ==
There were widespread protests against the court's decision all over the country. Members of the Central Legislature even petitioned the Viceroy of India to commute the death sentences given to the four men to life sentences. Appeals were also sent to the Privy Council. These requests were turned down and the men were finally executed. Appeals were claimed to have been also made by Mahatma Gandhi, despite his lack of executive authority.

=== Clemency appeal ===
On 22 August 1927, the Chief Court endorsed the original judgement with an exception of one (7 years) punishment from the judgement of 6 April. A mercy appeal was filed in due course before the Provincial Governor of U.P. by the members of the legislative council which was dismissed. Ram Prasad Bismil wrote a letter to Madan Mohan Malaviya on 9 September 1927 from Gorakhpur Jail. Malviya sent a memorandum to the then Viceroy and Governor-General of India Irwin with the signatures of 78 Members of Central Legislature, which was also turned down.

On 16 September 1927, the final mercy appeal was forwarded to the Privy Council in London and to the King, through a famous lawyer of England, Henry Polak, but the British Government, who had already decided to hang them, sent their final decision to the India office of Viceroy that all the four condemned prisoners were to be hanged till death by 19 December 1927 positively.

== In Culture ==
In 2026, the Government of Uttar Pradesh introduced Kakori Brand for Mangoes, in reverence to the martyrdom of the revolutionaries.

== See also ==
- Sukhdev Thapar
- Shivaram Rajguru
