= League Against Gandhism =

1930s political organisation in India

The League Against Gandhism, initially known as the Gandhi Boycott Committee, was a political organisation in Calcutta, India, founded by the underground Communist Party of India and others to launch militant anti-imperialist activities. The name of the group referred to the opposition of the communists to the compromise politics of Mohandas Karamchand Gandhi. The group took the name 'League Against Gandhism' in 1934.
