= Vishnu Sharan Dublish =

Indian politician

Member of Parliament, Lok Sabha
- In office 1957–1962
- Constituency: Sardhana, Uttar Pradesh

Member of Constituent Assembly of India
- In office 9 December 1946 – 24 January 1950

Personal details
- Born: 2 October 1895
- Died: 17 November 1986 (aged 91)
- Party: Indian National Congress

Vishnu Sharan Dublish (October 2, 1895 – November 17, 1986) was an Indian politician and freedom fighter. He was an associate of Bhagat Singh, Chandrashekhar Azad and involved in the Kakori Train robber during India's freedom movement. For his role in the Kakori conspiracy he was sentenced to Life Imprisonment in the Cellular jail in Port Blair, Andaman & Nicobar Islands. He was later freed in the 1940s shortly before Independence of India. He was a Member of Parliament, representing Sardhana, Uttar Pradesh in the Lok Sabha the lower house of India's Parliament as a member of the Indian National Congress. He was also a member of the Constituent Assembly of India. He was a student of Church Mission High School and Meerut College.
