= Dwarikapur =

Village in Uttar Pradesh, India

- Village
- Location in Uttar Pradesh, India
- Coordinates: 27.08868°N 79.13249°E
- Country: India
- State: Uttar Pradesh
- District: Mainpuri
- Tehsil: Bhongaon

Area
  - Total: 2.783 km^{2} (1.075 sq mi)

Population (2011)
  - Total: 1,734
  - Density: 623.1/km^{2} (1,614/sq mi)
- Time zone: UTC+5:30 (IST)

Dwarikapur (Dwārikāpur) is a village in Jagir block of Mainpuri district, Uttar Pradesh, India. As of 2011, it had a total population of 1,734, in 246 households.

== Demographics ==
As of 2011, Dwarikapur had a population of 1,734, in 246 households. This population was 52.8% male (916) and 47.2% female (818). The 0-6 age group numbered 225 (115 male and 110 female), or 13.0% of the total population. 20 residents were members of Scheduled Castes, or 1.2% of the total.

The 1981 census recorded Dwarikapur as having a population of 1,072 people, in 171 households.

The 1961 census recorded Dwarikapur (as "Dwarkapur") as comprising 5 hamlets, with a total population of 773 people (405 male and 368 female), in 159 households and 135 physical houses. The area of the village was given as 705 acres.

== Infrastructure ==
As of 2011, Dwarikapur had 1 primary school; it did not have any healthcare facilities. Drinking water was provided by hand pump; there were no public toilets. The village did not have a post office or public library; there was at least some access to electricity for all purposes. Streets were made of pakka materials.
