= Sachindra Bakshi =

Indian politician

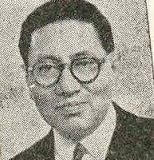
- Born: Sachindra Nath Bakshi; 25 December 1904; Benares, Benares State, British India
- Died: 23 November 1984 (aged 79); Sultanpur, Uttar Pradesh, India
- Occupation: Freedom fighter
- Organization: Hindustan Republican Association
- Movement: Indian Independence Movement

Sachindra Nath Bakshi (25 December 1904 – 23 November 1984) was a prominent Indian revolutionary and one of the founding members of Hindustan Republican Association (HRA, which after 1928 became the Hindustan Socialist Republican Association or HSRA) that was created to carry out revolutionary activities against the British Empire in India.

He was one of revolutionaries who participated in the Kakori train robbery and two months later he and his friends were sent to Barrack number 11 in the Lucknow Central Jail (now called Lucknow District Jail) and was sentenced to life for the same.

== Later life ==
In 1969 Bakshi was elected MLA of the Bharatiya Jana Sangh from Varanasi South. Once he narrated an incident related to the Kakori trial in the Vidhan Sabha which caused lot of uproar. He narrated how Jagat Narain Mulla, and his son – both of whom went on to become Congress leaders – for some money had chosen to be prosecution lawyers against the Kakori heroes.
