= Manmath Nath Gupta =

Indian Marxist revolutionary

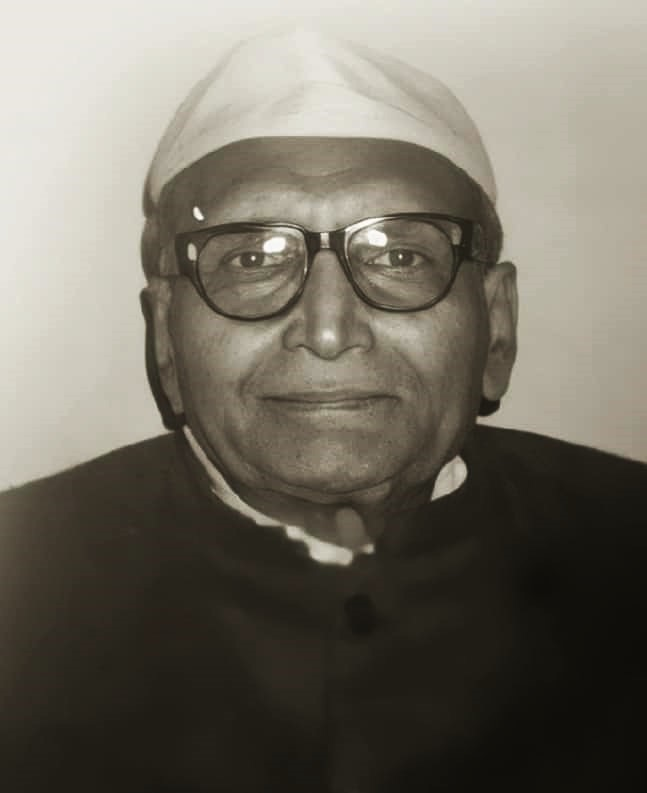
- Born: 7 February 1908; Benares, Benaras State, British India
- Died: 26 October 2000 (aged 92); Delhi, India
- Political party: Communist Party of India

Manmath Nath Gupta (7 February 1908 – 26 October 2000) was an Indian Marxist revolutionary writer and author of autobiographical, historical and fictional books in Hindi, English and Bengali. He joined the Indian independence movement at the age of 13 and was an active member of the Hindustan Republican Association. He participated in the famous Kakori train robbery in 1925 and was imprisoned for 14 years. On release from jail in 1937, he started writing against the British government. He was sentenced again in 1939 and was released in 1946 just a year before India's independence in 1947. He has written several books on the history of the Indian struggle for independence from a revolutionary's point of view, including They Lived Dangerously – Reminiscences of a Revolutionary. He was also the editor of the Hindi literary magazine Aajkal.

== Early life ==
Manmath Nath Gupta was born to Veereshvar Gupta on 7 February 1908 at Benaras in Benaras State of British India. His grandfather Adya Prasad Gupta was an original resident of Hugli district in Bengal who had migrated from there in the year 1880 and settled in Uttar Pradesh at Benares. Manmath got his early education in Biratnagar of Nepal where his father was posted as a school headmaster. Since his father got a job later in the Banaras, Manmath was admitted in Kashi Vidyapeeth for his further studies.

== First imprisonment ==
Manmath Nath Gupta joined the Indian nationalist movement as early as the age of 13 years. In 1921, he was distributing pamphlets in the Gadolia area of Benares calling for a boycott of the reception of the Edward, Prince of Wales by the Maharaja of Benares. When a police officer approached him, he stood his ground instead of running away. During the court proceedings, he told the judge, "I will not cooperate with you" He was jailed for three months.after he was even tortured in jail for distributing pamphlets.

== Chauri Chaura ==
He joined the Indian National Congress as a volunteer worker and went from village to village spreading the message of the Congress. He was dissatisfied with the slowness of the work and its inability in producing any short-term results. When Mahatma Gandhi called off the Non-cooperation movement after the incident at Chauri Chaura in 1922, Gupta was severely disappointed with the Congress and Gandhi.

== Hindustan Republican Association ==
He joined the Hindustan Republican Association, a group of young revolutionaries whose aim was to end the British rule of India, by violent means if necessary. "We were called revolutionaries but we were just ordinary people ready to sacrifice our lives for our country", he once said. He also introduced Chandrasekhar Azad to the association. In his book They Lived Dangerously, he recalls an incident in which Azad nearly shot him.

"Chandrasekhar Azad was learning how to load and unload a Mauser pistol. He had learned how to load and unload many other brands of revolvers and pistols, but this was a new make. He had liked it more than other brands. He went on with his work and I began to read something. Suddenly seized perhaps by the warmth of the machine, which he had come to adore during the last half an hour, he aimed the empty pistol—empty according to his knowledge—towards me and said, 'Be on your guard, I am going to shoot you.' Before I could say anything he had pulled the trigger and bang whizzed the bullet that had remained inside the barrel without his knowledge. Fortunately for us Azad was not yet the marksman that he was destined to be later on. Although he had fired from a close range, the bullet had missed my head by two inches and had buried itself in the wall. Imagine the consternation of Azad. He thought he had shot me through. I informed him that he had missed me. This, however, did not console him. He was almost in tears. With great difficulty I pacified him."

== Kakori conspiracy ==
The Kakori train robbery was the turning point in his life. On 9 August 1925, ten revolutionaries including Manmath Nath Gupta stopped a train near Kakori and looted the government treasury travelling in it. A passenger named Ahmed Ali was killed in this action by the bullet fired by Manmath. He was arrested along with all other revolutionaries and tried for this incident in the court, but being a teenager at that time, he was not sentenced to death. Instead, he was sentenced for 14 years' rigorous imprisonment. When he was released in 1937 he started writing against the British Government. He was again arrested in 1939 and imprisoned for life. He also spent some time in the Cellular Jail in Andaman.

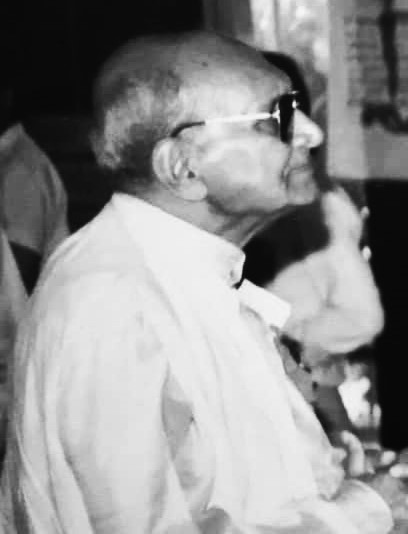
manmathnath gupta

== After independence ==
In 1946, he was released from imprisonment; just one year before India gained independence on 15 August 1947. He became a prolific writer, producing about 120 books in Hindi, English, and Bengali. In his book They Lived Dangerously he narrates the life of revolutionaries how they saw and reacted to the various events in Indian independence movement. This often presents an alternative point of view to the commonly accepted account. Speaking of the Chauri Chaura incident, he said, "India would have attained independence in 1922 but for Gandhi's bungling, as many competent writers have said, there is no doubt that on this occasion Gandhi had failed badly." He became a member of the Communist Party of India (CPI) and remained active in the political and social movements.

He joined the Indian Ministry of Information and Broadcasting and edited the Planning Commission's prestigious publications, including Yojna. He was also the editor of Bal Bharti, a children's magazine, and Aajkal, a Hindi literary magazine.

Manmath Nath Gupta was also present as an Indian delegate in the International Symposium on India and World Literature (IWL) at Vigyan Bhavan, New Delhi on 27 February 1985 which was organised by the Department of Modern European Languages, University of Delhi. He was much pleased when a paper on his leader titled as Pt. Ram Prasad 'Bismil': A Warrior of Pen & Pistol was placed before the delegates.

== Death on Diwali ==
His last interview on television was telecast in India on 19 December 1997 from DD National Channel in a 20-minute documentary entitled Sarfaroshi Ki Tamanna. In this interview Manmath Nath Gupta, confessed the mistake he made on 8 August 1925 when he fired the Mauser accidentally and a passenger was killed in the Kakori train robbery. Because of his mistake, 4 revolutionaries including his beloved leader Pandit Ram Prasad Bismil were hanged. He also expressed regret for not also being given a death sentence, because of his young age.

Manmath Nath Gupta died in the night of the Indian festival of Diwali on 26 October 2000 at his residence in Nizamuddin East New Delhi. He was 92 and very active right up to his death.

== Selected bibliography ==
- Chandrasekhar Azad
- They Lived Dangerously – Reminiscences of a Revolutionary (1969)
- Bhartiya Krantikari Andolan Ka Itihas (Revised: 1993)
- History of the Indian Revolutionary Movement (English version of above: 1972)
- Gandhi and His Times (1982)
- Bhagat Singh and His Times
- Aadhi raat ke atithi (Guests at Midnight)
- Congress ke sau varsh (Hundred Years of the Congress)
- Din Dahare (In Broad Daylight)
- Sar par kafan bandh kar (With My Funeral Shroud as My Turban)
- Toram Phoram
- Apane samaya ka surya Dinkar (The sun of his times: Ramdhari Singh 'Dinkar')
- Shahadatnama (Declaration of Martyrdom)

== See also ==
- Kakori Conspiracy
- Ram Prasad Bismil
- Chandrasekhar Azad
