= Mukundi Lal =

Indian freedom fighter

- Organization: Hindustan Socialist Republican Association
- Movement: Indian Independence movement

Mukundi Lal was an Indian revolutionary and an active member of Hindustan Socialist Republican Association (HSRA).

He was known for planning the Mainpuri Conspiracy (1918) and the Kakori Conspiracy, which was a train robbery that took place between Kakori and Alamnagar, near Lucknow, on 9 August 1925, during the Indian Independence Movement against British rule.

He along with other renowned revolutionaries started the 'Naujawan Bharat Sabha' at Lahore that was an organisation involved in various activities, mainly gearing the youth for the struggle for independence and putting an end to British Imperialism and communalism.

== Charges for conspiracies ==
He was sentenced to 7 years of rigorous imprisonment in Mainpuri conspiracy and life imprisonment for the Kakori conspiracy case.

== Death ==
Mukundi Lal was killed when planning a jailbreak for Bhagat Singh. Lal attempted to detonate a bomb by a wall that resembled the prison wall, and was killed when the bomb went off unexpectedly.
