= Shahjahanpur =

- City
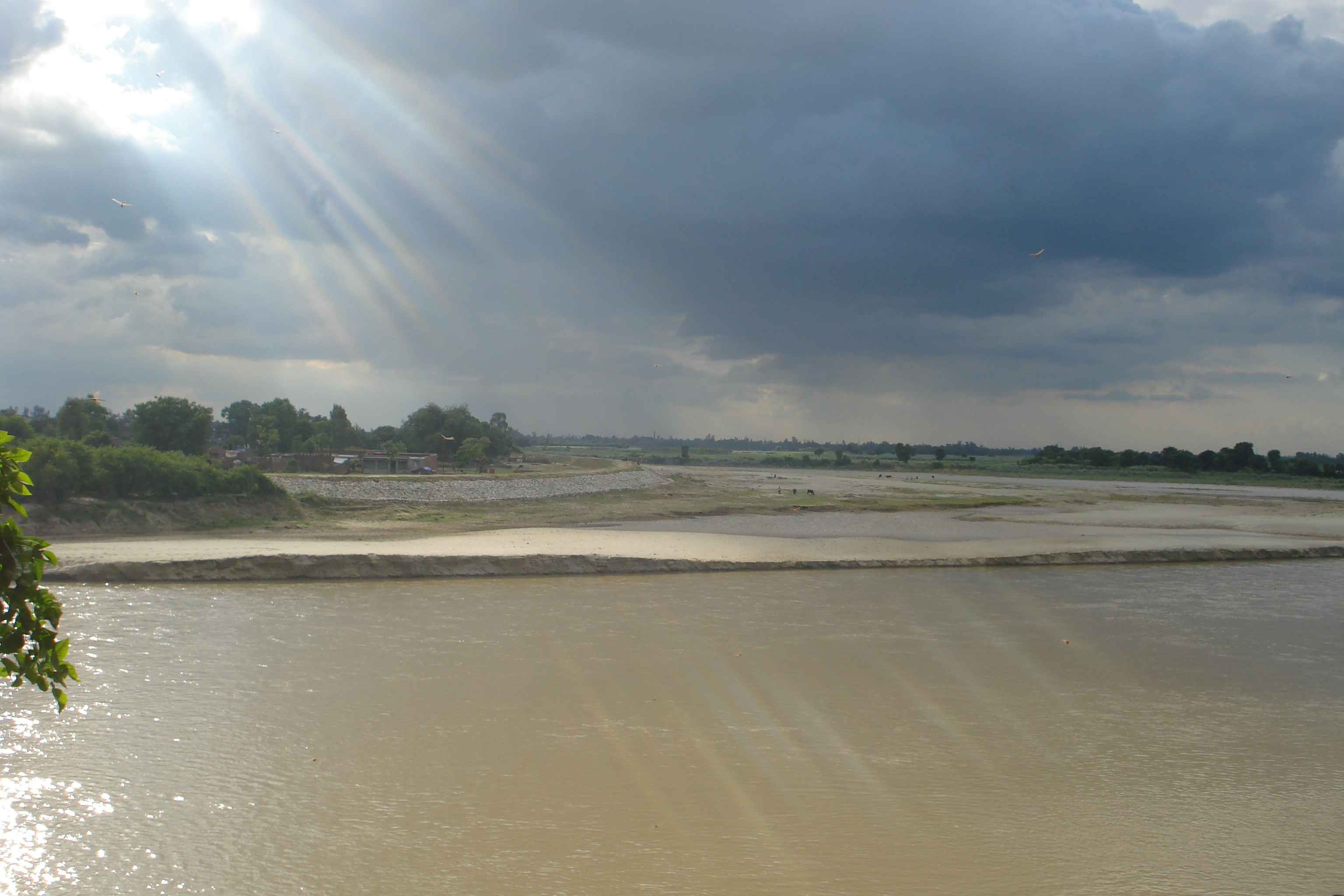
- River Garrah flowing through Shahjahanpur

- Location within Uttar Pradesh
- Coordinates: 27.88°N 79.91°E
- Country: India
- State: Uttar Pradesh
- District: Shahjahanpur
- Established: 1647
- Named for: Shah Jahan

Government
  - Body: Nagar Nigam

Area
  - Total: 51 km^{2} (20 sq mi)
- Elevation: 194 m (636 ft)

Population (2011)
  - Total: 346,103
  - Density: 6,800/km^{2} (18,000/sq mi)
- Time zone: UTC+5:30 (IST)
- PIN: 242001
- Telephone code: 05842
- Vehicle registration: UP-27
- Sex ratio: 880 ♀/ 1000 ♂
- Literacy: ▲61.99% Medium
- Website: shahjahanpur.nic.in

Shahjahanpur (/ˈʃɑːdʒəˌhɑːnpʊr/) is a municipal corporation, town and district headquarters of Shahjahanpur District in Uttar Pradesh, India.

The city is between Bareilly and Lucknow, the capital of Uttar Pradesh.

== History ==
Shahjahanpur was established by Dilir Khan and Bahadar Khan, sons of Dariya Khan, a soldier in army of the Mughal emperor Jahangir. Dariya Khan was originally from Kandahar, in modern-day Afghanistan. Both Dilir Khan and Bahadar Khan were dignitaries in the regime of Shah Jahan. Pleased with the services of Dilir Khan, Shah Jahan gave him 17 villages with the permission to construct a fort in 1647, following the suppression of the rebellious Katheria Rajputs. The area was then settled by Afghans, brought by Bahadar Khan following one of his campaigns.

On 9 August 1925, the Indian freedom fighters Ram Prasad Bismil, Ashfaqulla Khan, Chandrashekhar Azad and Rajendra Lahiri conducted a robbery of government funds near Kakori railway station. Both Bismil and Khan were born in Shahjahanpur.

== Geography ==
Shahjahanpur is located at 27.88°N 79.91°E. It has an average elevation of 194 metres (600 feet). It is situated at the junction of two river.

=== Climate ===
Climate data for Shahjahanpur (1981–2010, extremes 1977–2012)
Month	Jan	Feb	Mar	Apr	May	Jun	Jul	Aug	Sep	Oct	Nov	Dec	Year
Record high °C (°F)	28.3 (82.9)	32.8 (91.0)	38.8 (101.8)	43.4 (110.1)	45.0 (113.0)	46.2 (115.2)	43.2 (109.8)	39.5 (103.1)	37.5 (99.5)	37.4 (99.3)	33.5 (92.3)	28.7 (83.7)	46.2 (115.2)
Mean daily maximum °C (°F)	20.3 (68.5)	24.1 (75.4)	29.7 (85.5)	36.2 (97.2)	38.2 (100.8)	37.3 (99.1)	33.4 (92.1)	32.7 (90.9)	32.2 (90.0)	31.6 (88.9)	28.0 (82.4)	22.9 (73.2)	30.6 (87.1)
Mean daily minimum °C (°F)	7.1 (44.8)	9.9 (49.8)	14.1 (57.4)	19.5 (67.1)	23.9 (75.0)	25.8 (78.4)	25.7 (78.3)	25.4 (77.7)	23.8 (74.8)	18.0 (64.4)	11.8 (53.2)	8.0 (46.4)	17.7 (63.9)
Record low °C (°F)	0.6 (33.1)	2.6 (36.7)	6.0 (42.8)	8.4 (47.1)	15.6 (60.1)	17.0 (62.6)	20.1 (68.2)	20.0 (68.0)	15.0 (59.0)	8.4 (47.1)	5.0 (41.0)	1.2 (34.2)	0.6 (33.1)
Average rainfall mm (inches)	14.6 (0.57)	21.6 (0.85)	9.8 (0.39)	11.6 (0.46)	30.2 (1.19)	133.1 (5.24)	289.3 (11.39)	239.9 (9.44)	198.0 (7.80)	38.2 (1.50)	2.7 (0.11)	10.9 (0.43)	999.9 (39.37)
Average rainy days	1.1	1.6	1.1	1.2	1.9	5.2	11.0	11.3	8.0	1.3	0.3	0.8	44.9
Average relative humidity (%) (at 17:30 IST)	70	56	46	30	33	48	72	77	75	64	65	70	59
Source: India Meteorological Department

== Demographics ==
As per provisional data of 2011 census, Shahjahanpur urban agglomeration had a population of 346,103, out of which males were 183,087 and females were 163,016. The literacy rate was 69.81 per cent.

== Transport ==
Shahjahanpur is well-connected with major towns and cities in Uttar Pradesh through road and rail network. National Highway 30 links Shahjahanpur with Bareilly and Lucknow. A spur route National Highway 731 too passes through Shahjahanpur, linking it to the eastern UP town of Jaunpur.

Shahjahanpur railway station lies on Lucknow–Moradabad line of Indian Railways. Several through trains from Lucknow to Delhi pass through Shahjahanpur station.

== Cultural heritage ==
Over the years, the Shahjahanpur gharana contributed eminent sarod players such as Enayat Ali (1883 - 1915), Ustad Murad Ali Khan, Ustad Mohammed Ameer Khan, Pandit Radhika Mohan Moitra and Pandit Buddhadev Das Gupta. Present Sarod legend, Amjad Ali Khan also belongs to Shahjahanpur gharana.

== Notable people ==
- Abu Salman Shahjahanpuri (Pakistani Islamic Scholar)
- Dil Shahjahanpuri (Urdu Ghazal Writer)
- Madan Shahjahanpuri (Indian Muslim Theologian)
- Ram Prasad Bismil (Freedom Fighter)
- Ashfaqulla Khan (Freedom Fighter)
- Roshan Singh (Freedom Fighter)
- Prem Krishna Khanna (Freedom Fighter)
- Ram Chandra (Babuji) (Indian Spiritual Leader)
- Rajpal Yadav (Film Actor)
- Alok Pandey (Film Actor)
- Hira Thind (Punjabi singer)
- Jitin Prasada (Former Central Government Cabinet Minister)
- Vivek Agnihotri (Movie Director)
- Jitendra Prasada (Former M.P.)
- Naik Jadu Nath Singh (Param Vir Chakra)
- Mithlesh Kumar (Former member of parliament)
- Krishna Raj (Former MP)
- Suresh Kumar Khanna (UP Government Cabinet Minister)
- Rammurti Singh Verma (Former Minister of UP)
- Roshan Lal Verma (MLA Tilhar)
- Sharad Vir Singh (MLA Jalalabad)
- Salona Kushwaha (MLA Tilhar)

== Education ==
- Gandhi Faiz-E-Aam College
- Swami Shukdevanand University, Shahjahanpur
- Autonomous State Medical College, Shahjahanpur
- Varunarjun Medical College And Rohilkhand Hospital

== See also ==
- powayan
- khutar
- jewan
- nahil
