= Salona Kushwaha =

Indian politician

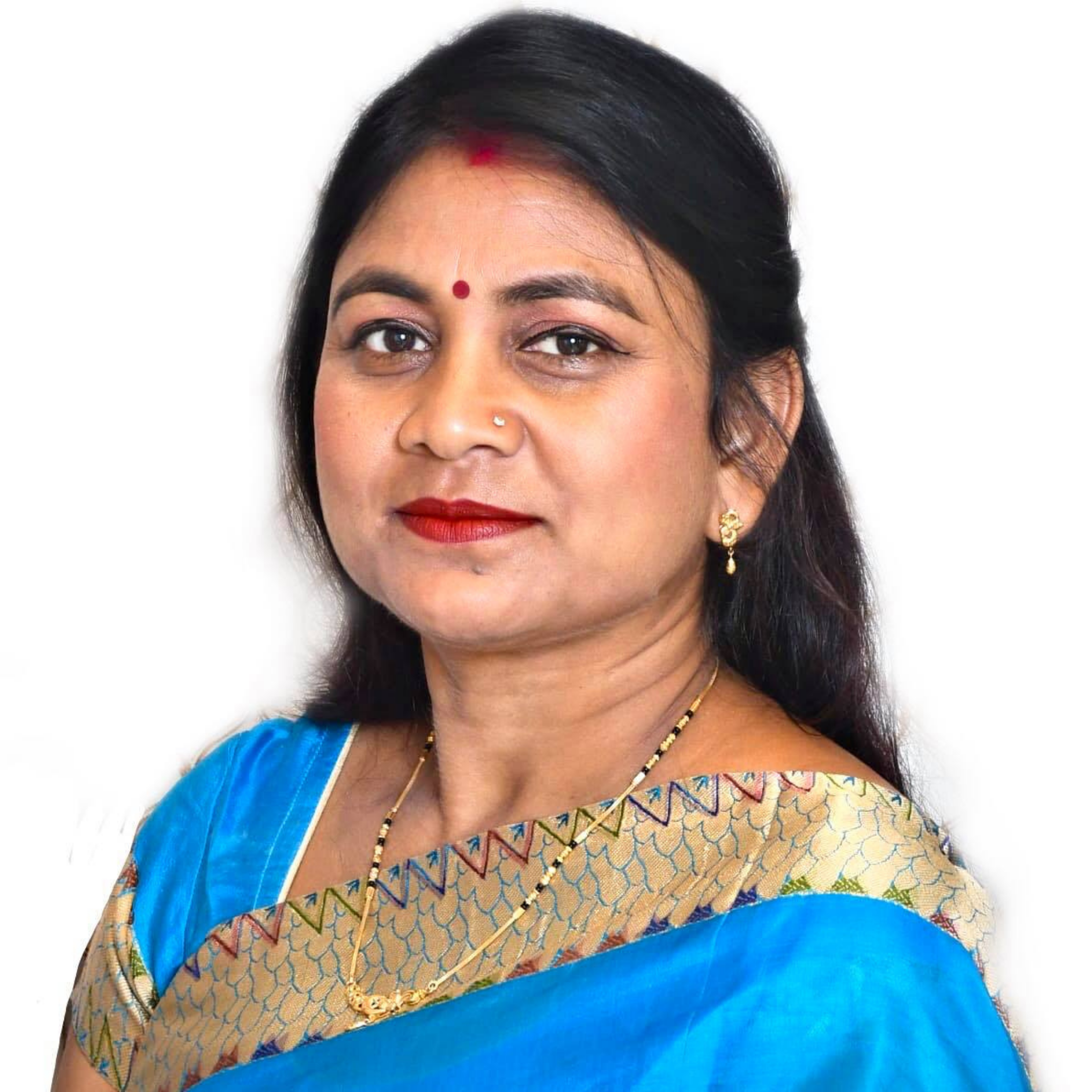

Member of the Uttar Pradesh Legislative Assembly
- Incumbent
- Assumed office 10 March 2022
- Preceded by: Roshan Lal Verma
- Constituency: Tilhar

Personal details
- Born: 7 March 1974 (age 52) Nigohi, Uttar Pradesh, India
- Party: Bharatiya Janata Party
- Spouse: Ram Singh Kushwaha
- Children: Shristi Kushwaha; Suryansh Vikram Singh
- Education: MA, Mahatma Jyotiba Phule Rohilkhand University
- Occupation: Politician

Salona Kushwaha (born 7 March 1974) is an Indian politician and a member of the 18th Uttar Pradesh Legislative Assembly. She represents the Tilhar constituency and belongs to the Bharatiya Janata Party (BJP).

== Early life and education ==
Kushwaha was born in Nigohi, in the Tilhar area of Shahjahanpur district. She earned a Master of Arts degree from Mahatma Jyotiba Phule Rohilkhand University. She is married to Ram Singh Kushwaha, a neurophysician.

== Political career ==
Kushwaha was initially announced as a Samajwadi Party candidate before joining the BJP ahead of the 2022 Uttar Pradesh Legislative Assembly election. The BJP then named her its candidate from Tilhar. She won the seat, succeeding Roshan Lal Verma, and took office on 10 March 2022.

== Social work ==
Kushwaha inaugurated the Women's Polytechnic College at Jahanpur in Tilhar, reportedly at the request of local girls. On 14 September 2022, a water tank providing drinking water to the college was completed, and an electric bus service was started between Shahjahanpur and the college for the benefit of its female students.

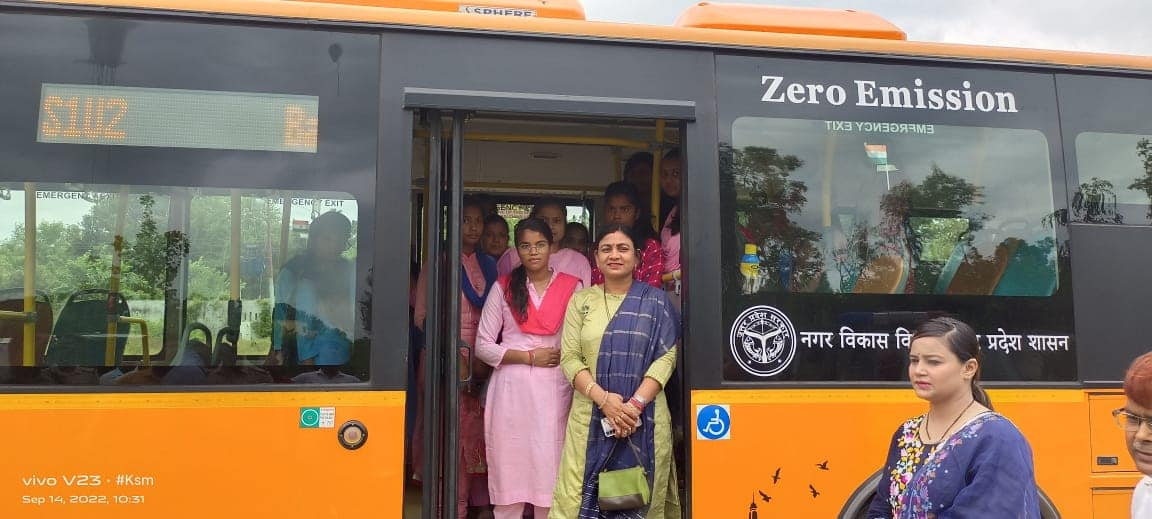
Inauguration of the bus service in Tilhar

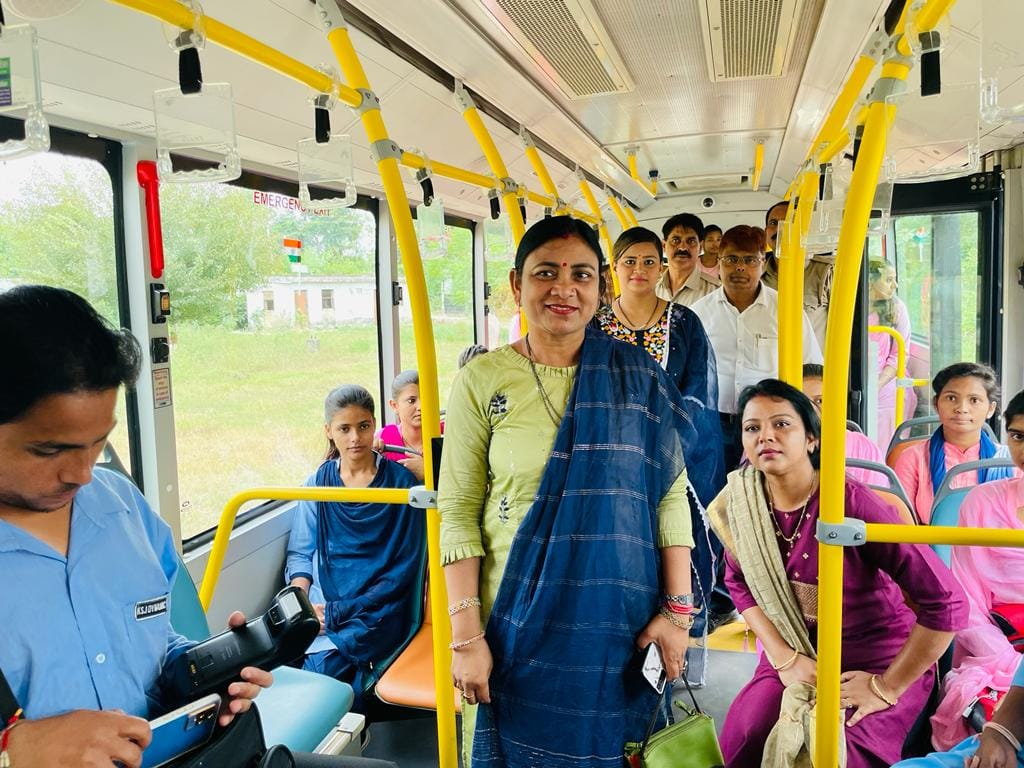
Electric bus service to the Polytechnic College, Jahanpur, 14 September 2022

On the same date, she donated street lights and a sky-lift machine to the Nagar Panchayat Nigohi.

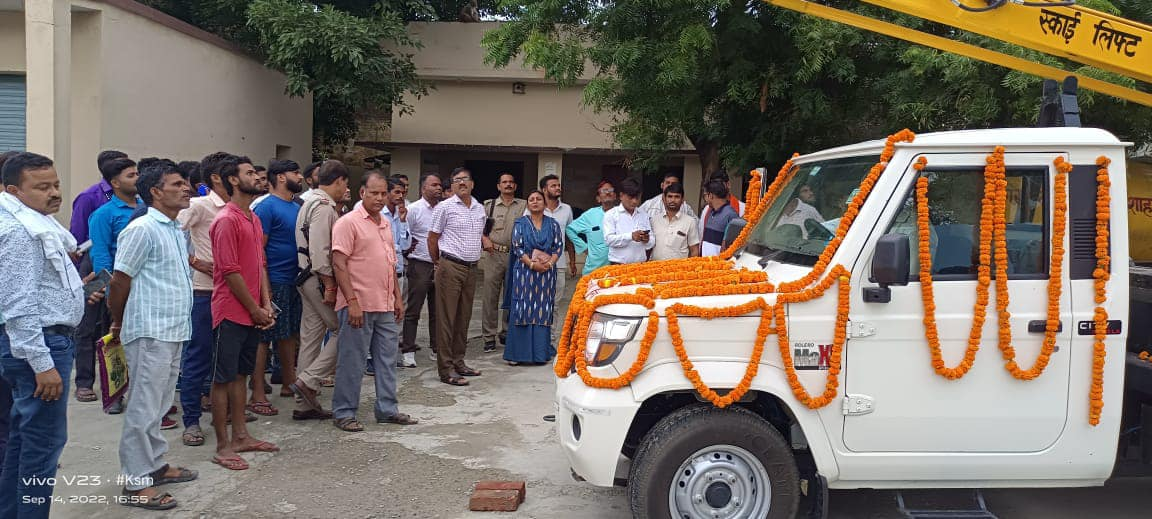
Sky-lift machine and street lights donated to Nagar Panchayat Nigohi

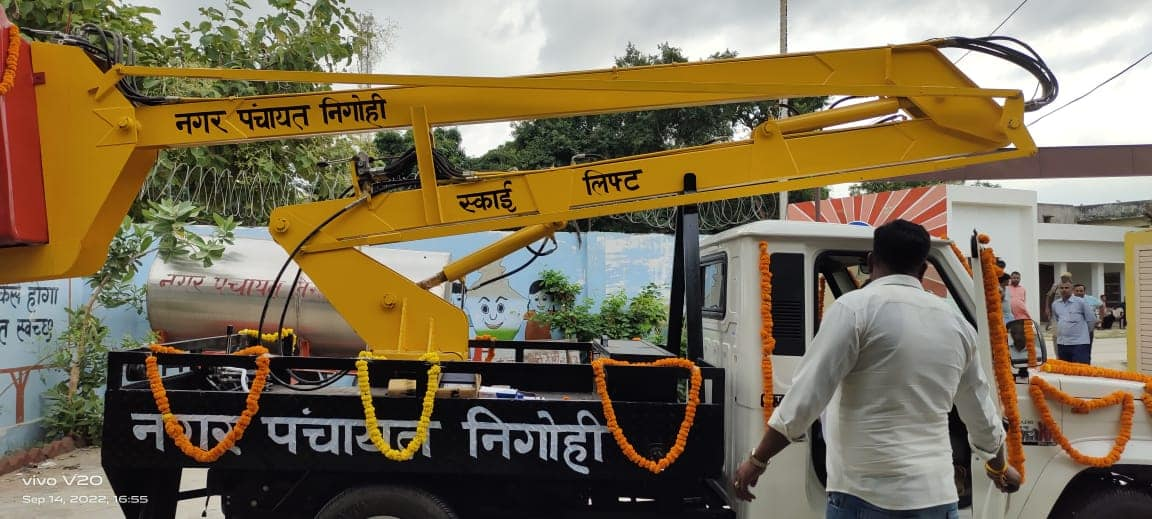
The sky-lift machine at Nigohi, Tehsil Tilhar

== Controversies ==
During the 2022 election, violence reportedly broke out between BJP workers and police in Nigohi, which falls under the Tilhar constituency. BJP workers alleged that police had taken money to support the Samajwadi Party candidate, and Kushwaha complained of "police inaction against fake votes". The incident occurred just after polling ended, when hundreds of BJP workers gathered outside the police station. According to eyewitnesses, police used mild force to bring the situation under control.
