= Jallapur =

Village in Uttar Pradesh

Coordinates: 28°05′00″N 79°41′22″E

Jallapur is a small village in Tilhar Tehsil of Shahjahanpur District of Uttar Pradesh State, India. Most of the people of Kurmi caste live in Jallapur village. Most of the people of village do agriculture, and this is their main source of income.‌ Jallapur village is Seven kilometer distant from Miranpur Katra. Jallapur Village is situated between Miranpur Katra and Khudaganj. The village has total population of 2000, of which 1000 are males and 945 are females, as per Population Census 2011. As per the constitution of India and the Panchyati Raaj Act.

The postal pin code is 262201.
