= Christopher Hills =

British writer

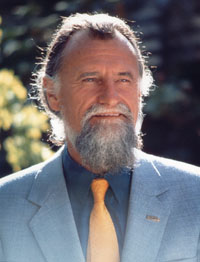
- Christopher Hills, 1993
- Born: April 9, 1926; Grimsby, Lincolnshire, United Kingdom
- Died: January 31, 1997 (aged 70); Boulder Creek, California, United States
- Known for: Spirituality, aquaculture
- Notable work: Over 30 books on food from sunlight, spirulina chakras, consciousness, divining, world peace, creative conflict resolution
- Movement: Yoga, Nutrition
- Spouse: Penny Slinger (m. 1996)
- Patrons: Jawaharlal Nehru

Christopher Brian Hills (April 9, 1926 – January 31, 1997) was an English-born author, described as the "Father of Spirulina" for popularizing spirulina cyanobacteria as a food supplement. He also wrote 30 books on consciousness, meditation, yoga and spiritual evolution, divining, world government, aquaculture, and personal health.

Hills was described by the press as a "Natural Foods Pioneer". There is no robust evidence that spirulina supplements have any significant beneficial health effects, and Hill's companies were sued for making misleading claims about their effectiveness.

== Early biography ==
Born in Grimsby, England to a family of fishermen, Hills grew up sailing the North Sea. In 1940 he enrolled as a cadet in nautical school and joined the British Merchant Navy during World War II. At sea, Hills had several life and death experiences that formed his views on karma, divinity and destiny. At the end of the war, as navigating officer for an Esso oil tanker docked in Curaçao, he set up shop as a commercial products dealer with branch offices in Venezuela and Aruba. When a client reneged on a deal, Hills moved to Jamaica. There with the help of the philanthropist Percy Junor he founded commodity companies specializing in sugar, bananas, insurance, telegraph communications and agricultural spices pimento, nutmegs and ginger. Financing for the first export corporation came from British businessman Andrew Hay, then husband of best-selling motivational author Louise Hay who in the 1950s was a high-fashion model and family friend.

On July 29, 1950, Christopher Hills married Norah Katherine Bremner (May 6, 1916 - December 14, 1995) in Saint Andrew, Surrey, Jamaica. Norah was an English woman who was deputy headmistress of Wolmer's School in Kingston. Her father, Bernard Eustace Bremner (1889–1976), was the Magistrate, Chief of Customs, and Mayor of King's Lynn, Norfolk who in 1951 co-founded the King's Lynn Festival with concert pianist Ruth Roche, Baroness Fermoy. Lady Fermoy, wife of Baron Fermoy, is Diana, Princess of Wales' maternal grandmother. The Hillses had two sons, both born in Jamaica.

== Jamaica business leader ==
From 1949 to 1967, Christopher and Norah Hills became influential in Jamaica's commerce, art, politics and culture.

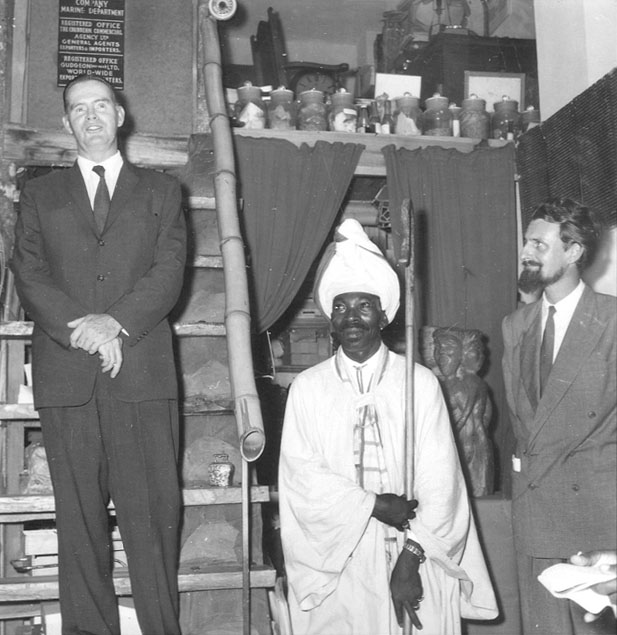
Governor of Jamaica Sir Hugh Foot opening a 1957 Hills Galleries exhibition showing works by Mallica "Kapo" Reynolds with Christopher Hills

Believing that Jamaica's strength lay in its agriculture, Hills co-founded the Jamaica Agriculture & Industrial Party (AIP) as an alternative to the two major political parties: Jamaica Labour Party (JLP) and People's National Party (PNP), both of which he felt were too busy warring with each other to look out for the middle class and the country people who were the backbone of Jamaica's rural economy. Despite competing vigorously in the polls, the Hills couple were nevertheless close friends with JLP leader Sir Alexander Bustamante and Norman Manley, head of the PNP, who both served as Jamaican Prime Ministers. Norman Manley had been best man at the Hills' wedding.

In 1951 Christopher and Norah Hills founded Hills Galleries Ltd, which, in cooperation with the Prime Minister's wife Edna Manley, became a nexus of the Jamaican art movement. The Gallery & Antiques showroom at 101 Harbour Street, Kingston was built on the site of Simon Bolivar's Jamaica residence where, in 1815, the revolutionary wrote his famous letter Carta de Jamaica.

Throughout the 1950s and 1960s Hills Galleries supplied and exhibited local celebrity artists Ian Fleming and Noël Coward, enjoyed the patronage of British royals and such high-profile clients as Sadruddin Aga Khan, Winthrop Rockefeller, Elizabeth Taylor, Lady Bird Johnson, Grace Kelly and Errol Flynn. Hills Galleries was also the main agent for Rowney's, Grumbacher and Winsor & Newton art supplies in the West Indies. Through multiple exhibitions, the Hillses nurtured or launched the careers of a plethora of Jamaican artists, such as Gaston Tabois, Kenneth Abendana Spencer, Carl Abrahams, Barrington Watson, Albert Huie, Gloria Escoffery, and the revivalist preacher/painter/sculptor Mallica Reynolds.

Christopher Hills opened a Hills Galleries branch on Jamaica's north coast at Montego Bay, mooring his yacht, the Robanne at Round Hill, a popular resort for foreign leaders and industrialists vacationing in the Caribbean. It was there he met then Vice President Lyndon Johnson and CBS president William S. Paley, who in 1956, sponsored a Hills Galleries exhibition of Jamaican art at Barbizon Plaza in New York City, which awoke U.S. art collectors to Jamaica's dynamic sphere of artistic talent. The exhibition was described by the Daily Gleaner as "Epochal in the establishment of a market for West Indian art." The Hills family spent weekends and holidays at Port Antonio visiting friends and clients including their neighbor, novelist Robin Moore at Blue Lagoon. There Hills met Baron Hans Heinrich Thyssen-Bornemisza who asked Hills to curate part of his art collection. For five years many classic works of the baron's international art acquisitions decorated the walls of the Hills' home. Von Thyssen also granted Hills' children access to his private island at San San near Port Antonio.

== Rastafari movement ==
Hills also became an advocate for Jamaica's Rastafari movement, who were being oppressed in the late fifties. He gave Rastafarians jobs as woodcarvers, free paints to poor artists, such as the now-famed Ras Dizzy and bailed them out of Spanish Town Prison while encouraging rasta brethren to sustain themselves through art and music. Christopher and Norah Hills were personally thanked for their years of support for struggling rastas by Mortimo Planno, the Rasta teacher of Bob Marley and one of the few Rastafarian elders to have met with Emperor Haile Selassie in Addis Ababa, Ethiopia.

Hills also reasoned Gandhian nonviolence with Leonard Howell, activist who founded Pinnacle, a Rastafarian community farm at Sligoville, a few miles from Hills' home. In 1958 Pinnacle was raided in a brutal crackdown by the authorities, ostensibly for growing marijuana, but in fact Rastafari at that time was regarded by The Crown as a threat to social harmony. Hills interceded with the Prime Minister but, with an election coming, law and order politics prevailed and many sustainable farming families had to leave the land. For his support, Hills was given the moniker "The First White Rasta". Unlike his skeptical friends and business colleagues, he saw Rastafarian spirituality as a righteous way of life, indeed growing out his hair and beard in solidarity and also in keeping with his emerging interest in the sadhus and enlightened sages of India who had much in common with the vegetarian mystical Rastafarians.

== Spiritual awakening ==
By 1960 Christopher Hills had accumulated a large metaphysical library on frequent trips to Samuel Weiser Books in New York, while writing his own books, Kingdom of Desire, Power of the Doctrine and The Power of Increased Perception. At 30 he retired from business and began to research multiple spiritual paths and the physics of what Albert Einstein called Unified field theory. Prolific research papers and lectures came out of Hills' laboratory in the Blue Mountains (Jamaica) on subjects such as bioenergetics, hypnosis, tele-thought, biophysics, effects of solar radiation on living organisms, resonant systems of ionosphere, and capacitor effects of human body on static electricity and electron discharge of the nervous system. In 1960 he began a 30-year project to document the effects of sound and color on human consciousness and states of health.

== Global outreach ==
With Norah Hills running the galleries, Hills set forth on a two-year journey travelling in Asia, Europe, Pakistan and India, meeting with members of the UN and calling on politicians, scientists and religious leaders. UNESCO hired him to shoot 1,000 photographs of their projects in faraway countries, which appeared in an exhibit at United Nations headquarters.

Hills' global odyssey's itinerary grew out of publishing his views on conflict resolution and alternative government in a manifesto, Framework for Unity, that was circulated to The Commission for Research in the Creative Faculties of Man, a network he had founded of thinkers around the world which, in 1961, included Humphry Osmond, Andrija Puharich, David Ben-Gurion, and Lady Isobel Cripps, among its 500 members.

After teaming up with his good friend and noted lawyer Luis Kutner (co-founder of Amnesty International), Hills decided to search the world for a spot to establish a Center where a dedicated community could live and test his World Constitution for Self-Government by Nature's Laws, which he published in a book with an introduction by Bertrand Russell.

== Friendship with Jawaharlal Nehru ==
Working his way on a speaking tour through Europe in the direction of India, Hills decided to make a precarious expedition to the remote Himalayan Hunza Valley where he had long been curious about the diet and extraordinary longevity of the Pashtun, Balti and Uzbek hill tribes. In Pakistan, Hills was the guest of Professors Duranni and Walid Uddin at Peshawar's College of Engineering. Visiting Sufi holy men and Islamic scholars in Karachi, he met Zulfikar Ali Bhutto to discuss possible Indo-Pakistan cooperation in algae cultivation in the climatically suitable Gujrat-Sind border region, which is where Bhutto and his ancestors were from. Later, when Bhutto was overthrown in a military coup, Hills orchestrated urgent appeals to General Muhammad Zia-ul-Haq for clemency, but, like many westerners protesting Bhutto's imprisonment, was ignored, and Bhutto was hanged.

In the 1950s Hills became known to Indian Prime Minister Jawaharlal Nehru through his friend the Deputy leader of India's Congress Party, Surendra Mohan Ghose, a Bengali revolutionary and relative of Sri Aurobindo. Hills invited Ghose to Jamaica, to speak at the 1961 Commonwealth Parliamentary Conference, and together they formed a partnership to promote World Union and global famine relief through algae aquaculture. S.M. Ghose was one of the founders of Auroville, an experimental sustainable-living International Village in Tamil Nadu. In 1962 Ghose took Hills to Sri Aurobindo Ashram for a personal audience with Aurobindo's successor, spiritual head of the ashram, Mirra Alfassa, known as "The Mother". Later Ghose arranged for Christopher Hills' son, John Hills, to give the keynote address at the World Parliament of Youth in Puducherry in 1971.

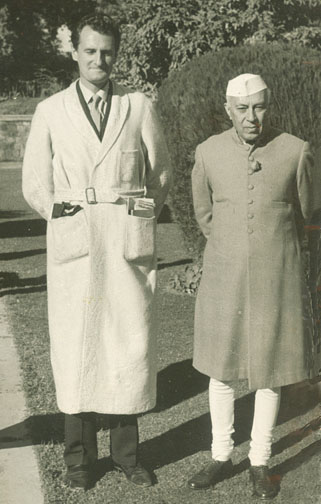
Christopher Hills with Indian Prime Minister Jawaharlal Nehru at Teen Murti Bhavan, New Delhi

In 1959 Hills had lobbied Nehru to approve a government in exile for the Dalai Lama fleeing persecution in Tibet and to grant full refugee status to exiled Tibetans. He had become connected to the Tibetans through his study of Buddhism and in 1960 provided funding for the Young Lama's Home School in Dalhousie, Himachal Pradesh founded by his English friend Freda Bedi, one of Gandhi's handpicked satyagrahis who became Gelongma Karma Kechog Palmo, the first Western woman to take ordination in Tibetan Buddhism. Freda Bedi is the mother of film and television star Kabir Bedi. In 1968 Hills contributed to Freda Bedi's building of the Karma Drubgyu Thargay Ling nunnery at Tilokpur in the Kangra Valley and helped organize her journey to the West with the 16th Gyalwa Karmapa, Rangjung Rigpe Dorje in 1974.

When Hills arrived in India, he found Nehru besieged by border disputes with China and discussion inevitably turned to Hills' theories of conflict resolution and how to avoid war. Their connection also evolved out of the fact that India was experiencing famine in some states. With dependence on wheat shipments from the United States, Hills helped lobby President Lyndon Johnson for an increase in wheat aid, which was granted. But when Hills mentioned his research with algae as a food source, then Nehru became interested and offered to support cultivation in India.

While in New Delhi, Hills spent time with the prime minister at Teen Murti Bhavan, enjoying Jawaharlal Nehru's rose gardens and meeting his daughter Indira Gandhi. Hills was the guest of Indian industrialist G.D. Birla, where on his first day in India, he had met Swami Shantananda, a sage and a politically connected guru with whom Hills would travel throughout India for two years, much like a roaming sanyassin. On one of his "pilgrimages", Hills was taken by Shantanananda and Nehru's Parliamentary Secretary S.D. Upadhyaya to Brindavan for a private audience with India's highest female yogini Sri Anandamayi Ma, from whom he felt a "genuine sublime holiness" and received one of the most significant blessings in his life.

In Patna, Bihar, Hills, along with Raynor Johnson, were the only Europeans to attend the 1961 Science & Spirituality Conference, where seeds were sown for Hills' decade of cooperation with hundreds of Indian scientists and yogis, many of whom eventually journeyed to visit Hills' centres in the West and who comprised many of the delegates for a 1970 Yoga conference Hills staged in New Delhi.

In 1963, the Sri Aurobindo Ashram and Gandhi Peace Foundation sponsored another conference in Patna, hosted by Rajendra Prasad, Mahatma Gandhi's longtime right-hand disciple and first President of India. Prasad was supposed to speak at the conference but became ill, and Hills' guru Shantananda was leading prayers for him every day at the Sadaqat Ashram in Patna. Prasad requested to meet Hills, whose goals for World Union he had heard about from Nehru. Hills considered Prasad the most spiritual of the founders of Independent India, and their meeting was a profound encounter in which Prasad gave his blessing for Hills' global endeavors, but then the president lost consciousness, tightly holding onto Hills' hand.

== Microalgae International ==
In earlier travels from Jamaica to Japan, Hills had formed an aquaculture research company with his friend and colleague, biologist Dr Hiroshi Nakamura, Dean of Tokyo Women's University. Dr Nakamura was a noted scientist and a colleague of Emperor Hirohito (himself a marine biologist) who asked Nakamura to research alternative food sources for Japan after the bombings of Hiroshima and Nagasaki had devastated food supplies. The goal of Hills and Nakmura's organization Microalgae International Union, was to develop strains of algae as a way of harnessing the sun's energy for biofuels and human nutrition and as a solution to World Hunger. Presented with M.I.U.'s feasibility studies, Indian Prime Minister Jawaharlal Nehru endorsed Hills' proposal for bringing the cultivation of protein-rich Chlorella algae to the villages of India.

With India's Home Minister, Gulzari Lal Nanda, Hills had co-founded the Institute of Psychic and Spiritual Research in New Delhi. A devout Gandhian, Nanda feared social upheaval and possible communal violence if poor and hungry villagers started migrating to India's cities so he threw his support behind Hills' plan for developing rural economies via small footprint aquaculture that could help villages become sustainable. A detailed plan for a pilot project in the Rann of Kutch was approved by the Indian government. However, the initiative became mired in bureaucracy when Nehru died in 1964. Nanda became acting prime minister but only until the new Prime Minister Lal Bahadur Shastri was nominated to succeed Nehru. Shastri continued working with Hills and had his staff prepare a budget request for Parliament to fund the chlorella algae project. However, because it competed with traditional agricultural interests, the aquaculture project became victim to political jockeying as well as an outbreak of war with Pakistan. With Shastri's mysterious death at the 1966 India-Pakistan peace conference in Tashkent, the project lost its key sponsor.

Nevertheless, the networks Hills had established with the founders of modern India proved valuable when his son, John Hills, was introduced by Nanda and S.M. Ghose to Prime Minister Indira Gandhi, who helped the younger Hills garner support among India's Congress party and religious leaders for India's largest conference of Western scientists and Indian yogis.

== Centre House, London ==
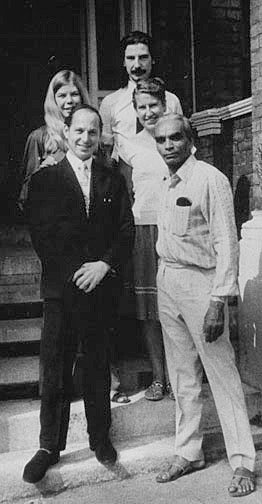
Members of Centre House community with Hatha Yoga teacher Malcolm Strutt and Yoga Master B.K.S. Iyengar

Three years after Jamaica's 1962 declaration of Independence from Britain, the Hills family moved to London, at the suggestion of two of his mentors, Bertrand Russell and Sir George Trevelyan, 4th Baronet. They helped Hills find and purchase a six-story Edwardian building in London's leafy Kensington. There Christopher Hills and others, including Kevin Kingsland, founded Centre House, a self-discovery and human-potential community known as a nucleus of yoga and spirituality in the emerging New Age movement throughout the late sixties and seventies. Seekers came from all over the world to study with visiting gurus, such as Swami Satchidananda, Muktananda, B.K.S. Iyengar, Sangharakshita and John G. Bennett as well as Sanskrit scholar Dr. Rammurti Mishra, Christmas Humphreys, Tibetan lamas, chief Druids, homeopathic doctors and scientists studying meditation, telepathy and neuroplasticity in Hills' Yoga Science laboratory. It was here Christopher Hills wrote his magnum opus, Nuclear Evolution – recognized as a definitive treatise on the chakras as they relate to the human endocrine system, light frequencies and human personality. Yoga Journal described the book as, "Synthesizing a vast amount of information ranging from the structure of DNA to the metaphysics of consciousness" and also as, "A giant step forward in integrating science with religion in a meaningful way."

Centre House was an experiment in group consciousness where the majority of residents were well-educated students, teachers and scientists interested in the convergence of science and spirituality. For a while the large basement kitchen was a macrobiotic restaurant, first run by Craig Sams which counted Yoko Ono among its health-conscious patrons. One of the early members of Centre House, Muz Murray (Ramana Baba) founded "Gandalf's Garden" magazine there, a publication chronicling the spiritual vitality of London's New Age scene, and which later also became a separate mystical community at World's End, London. Kevin Kingsland went on to found the Centre for Human Communication in Devon and Grael Associates (a Community Company).

== World Conference on Scientific Yoga, New Delhi ==
In December 1970 Christopher Hills, his son John, and Kevin Kingsland organized the world's first World Conference on Scientific Yoga (WCSY) in New Delhi, bringing 50 Western scientists together with 800 of India's leading swamis, yogis and lamas to discuss their research and establish a network for the creation of a World Yoga University.

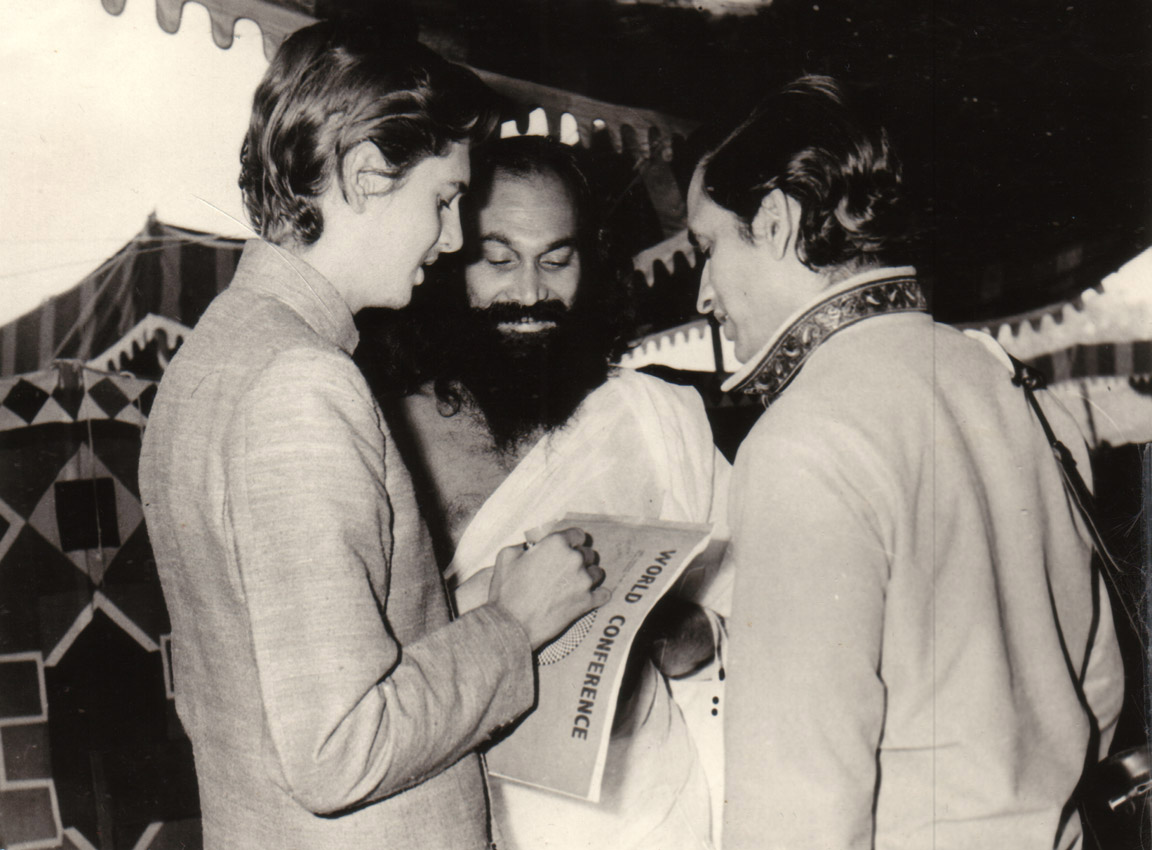
John Hills discusses the World Conference on Scientific Yoga program with Dhirendra Brahmachari and Amrit Desai in New Delhi

The conference generated some controversy when Indian politics intersected with religion, particularly the concept of Christ Yoga, a book Hills had written linking Christ's teachings to those of Buddha and the Vedas. But the conclave nevertheless emerged as a milestone in the soon-to-be-booming migration of Indian yogis to the West. John Hills, helped by his father's prior relationship with Nehru, worked with India's Prime Minister Indira Gandhi and the Nehrus' yoga master Dhirendra Brahmachari to steer a fractious committee of MPs, ministers and often competitive spiritual leaders from disparate religions and castes into creating a uniquely diverse and widely hailed program of events. Presenters from the West included transpersonal psychology pioneer Stanislav Grof and Sidney Jourard who compared their research in lively sessions with Indian scholars, scientists, philosophers and yogis such as B.K.S. Iyengar, Shri K. Pattabhi Jois, Jiddu Krishnamurti, Swami Satchidananda, Padma Bhushan Murugappa Channaveerappa Modi, R.R. Diwaker, Swami Rama, Acharya Dharma Deva Vidya Martand, Kaivalyadhama Health and Yoga Research Center and yoga hospital founder G. S. Melkote,

The actor James Coburn, a yoga and martial arts practitioner, described the World Conference on Scientific Yoga as "Very rewarding for me, definitely worth the time and money getting here."

During the conference, Dhirendra Brahmachari presided over the wedding of organizer Kevin Kingsland and yoga teacher Venika Mehra. James Coburn also attended. Kevin and Venika Kingsland went on to establish various Centres for Human Communication in the UK, USA and India, teaching yoga, human communication and promoting community consciousness.

Post-conference, the select delegates' presentations were published in CHAKRA magazine, founded with the help of Tantra scholar Ajit Mookerjee and Indian art patron Virendra Kumar and edited by John Hills whose first venture in publishing was mentored by Baburao Patel M.P., editor of Filmindia and Mother India magazines.

The conference was deemed a success and Christopher Hills was elected by a majority of the delegates to establish a World Yoga University somewhere on the planet. A mission that would take him from the United Kingdom to the United States.

== University of the Trees ==
Christopher Hills visited his friend Laura Huxley who urged him to move to the United States where he settled in Boulder Creek, California, and became a U.S. citizen. There, amidst the ancient redwoods, he founded in 1973, an accredited college, University of the Trees, an alternative education and research center for the social sciences to study the laws of nature and their relation to human consciousness. Students lived on campus and studied subjects as diverse as the pseudoscientific alternative medicine radionics and dowsing (Hills was a well-known diviner), meditation, hatha yoga, the Vedas, and early forms of social networking he called "Group Consciousness".

The campus housed University of the Trees Press which published Christopher Hills' writings and the research of a number of resident students who obtained degrees at the university and wrote books on light & color frequencies and the pseudoscience of radionics. Hills coauthored "Conduct Your Own Awareness Sessions" with new-age author Robert B. Stone to whom the university later bestowed an honorary PhD. A small workshop produced pendulums for dowsing and a line of negative ion generators.

From this base in California, Hills extended his hospitality to scientists, writers, philosophers and scholars such as Alan Watts, Edgar Mitchell, Barbara Marx Hubbard, Allen Ginsberg, Thelma Moss, Hiroshi Motoyama, Haridas Chaudhuri, Sri Lanka president Ranasinghe Premadasa, Menninger Foundation's Swami Rama, Evarts G. Loomis, Viktoras Kulvinskas, Max Lüscher, Marcia Moore.

== Supersensonics ==
Within the campus, Hills founded an experimental laboratory, managed by physicist Dr. Robert Massy, to develop his theories on the Electro Vibratory Body – documenting what Hills' colleague Stanford University's William A. Tiller Ph.D., calls "subtle energies" or "psychoenergetics". Shortly before he died radionics pioneer George de la Warr donated a substantial portion of his research files, library and instruments to Christopher Hills. In 1975 Hills wrote the book Supersensonics: The Science of Radiational Paraphysics, widely considered "The Bible of dowsing" The book covers subjects including divining, telepathy, The I Ching, Egypt's Pyramids, Biblical miracles and discusses the value of low level extrasensory phenomena vs higher levels of insight, wisdom and consciousness. New Age Journal magazine called Supersensonics "A short course in miracles for scientist and seeker alike."

== International philanthropy ==
With the Cold War in full swing liberation from the evils of totalitarianism was a constant theme in Hills writings. He lobbied hard against the KGB's persecution of Aleksandr Solzhenitsyn and the internal exile with police surveillance of Andrei Sakharov and the denial of an exit visa for Natan Sharansky's emigration to Israel.

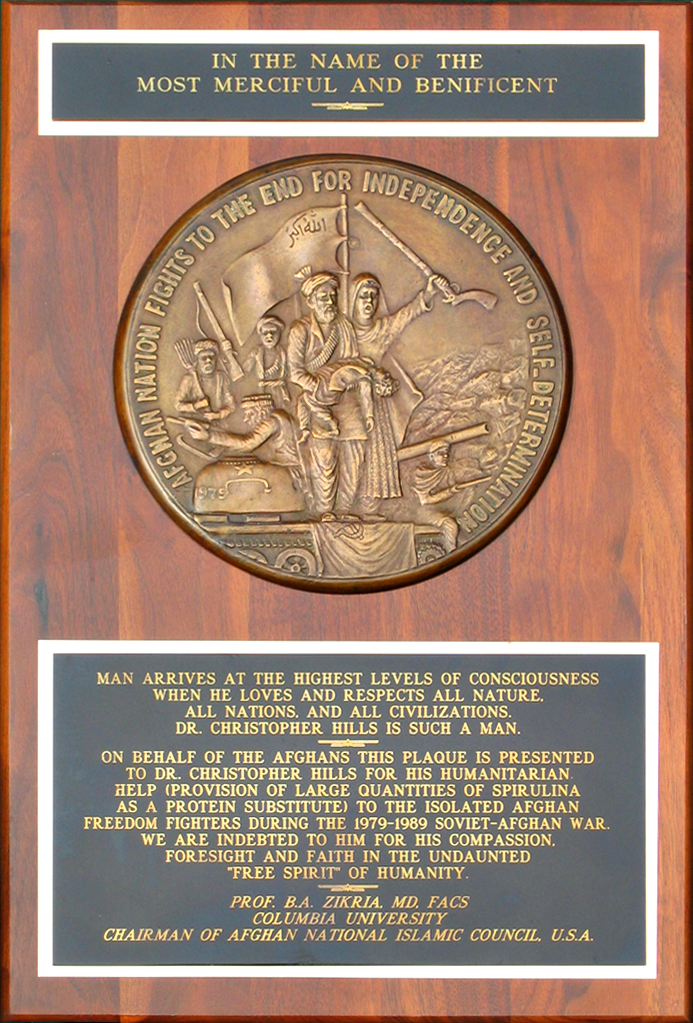
Award presented to Christopher Hills for his humanitarian services during the Soviet–Afghan War

Christopher Hills' lifelong crusade against dictatorships and Man's inhumanity was manifested in the book Rise of the Phoenix while his passionate beliefs against deficit spending were set forth in a book on the global economy—The Golden Egg. A recurring theme throughout all Christopher Hills' approaches to world, local and family problems was a process he developed called "Creative Conflict"—the same principles of solving differences between individuals, political parties and even nations that Hills had debated with Adlai Stevenson, Nehru and Luis Kutner.

Throughout the seventies and eighties Hills focused on international affairs, particularly the emergence of democracy in the Soviet Republics, eventually traveling to Russia to meet with Mikhail Gorbachev where he joined the Soviet Peace Committee. U.S. Presidents Ronald Reagan and George H. W. Bush bestowed awards on Hills for his commitment to democratic freedom and his humanitarian support for victims of oppression.

The Christopher Hills Foundation donated more than $9 million worth of spirulina products to charitable organizations in the U.S. and abroad. When the Soviet Union had occupied Afghanistan, Hills learned from his friends in Peshawar that Afghan freedom fighter Ahmad Shah Masoud's mujahadeen troops as well as Tajik and Pashtun tribals were starving because supply routes had been cut by Russian forces. Hills donated and shipped $300,000 worth of spirulina, which was packed in by mules with help from Senator Charlie Wilson to sustain the Afghans.

In 1989 Sri Lanka president Ranasinghe Premadasa, struggling to find a formula to end the Sri Lankan Civil War, traveled to Boulder Creek to meet with Hills and learn more about his conflict resolution concepts. The two men shared a spiritual connection and established a close friendship. Premadasa then brought the Ceylon conflict closer to a democratic solution than any other Sri Lankan president had. However, the Liberation Tigers of Tamil Eelam hierarchy had split and in 1993 a faction assassinated Premadasa in a suicide bombing that killed 23 people.

== Spirulina ==
Hills and Nakamura had a vision of feeding the world from lakes, seas and backyard aquaculture and in 1975 they authored a book, Food from Sunlight which published all their proprietary research as open source for the world to use in the cause against global famine and malnutrition. Their company, Microalgae International, invested in research and technology to find a super food for solving World Hunger. Early research focused on chlorella but its cellular structure was too small to be collected without expensive centrifuges. However, in 1967, while Dr Nakamura was living at Centre House, they discovered that women at Lake Chad were harvesting an algae in baskets to make dihé, a highly nutritious sun-baked biscuit. After studying the lakes of Africa, Hills and Dr Nakamura developed seed culture for a strain of 70% protein algae called spirulina that they had collected from Lake Aranguachi, Ethiopia. Later, in 1981, Hills made an expedition to Lake Chiltu at the invitation of Mr. Wollie Chekal, Minister of Trade for the Ethiopian Revolutionary Government and brought back a new set of spirulina samples to his California laboratory for hybridizing an optimal strain for commercial cultivation.

For millennia spirulina had been a food staple for natives of Lake Chad and also for the Aztecs but Hills funded much of the early experimentation needed for its successful modern day mass cultivation, described in Dr Nakamura's book Spirulina: Food for a Hungry World.

To manufacture spirulina nutritional products Hills started the Light Force company in Santa Cruz, California, which was one of the early models for multi-level marketing. Customers began reporting weight loss and health benefits from spirulina and the success story was featured in The National Enquirer. Sales skyrocketed into the millions of dollars propelling Light Force to 50,000 distributors worldwide. To grow that much spirulina Hills formed joint ventures with Koor Foods in Eilat, Israel, Taiwan Aqua in Taipei and Sosa Texcoco at Lake Texcoco in Mexico. Hills also had an association with Cyanotech on the Big Island of Hawaii which grew a very pure Pacifica brand of spirulina. By 1995 more than 5,000 tons of spirulina a year were being imported for Light Force products. To encourage domestic research and production Hills purchased a 150-acre farm and built raceway ponds filled from the land's own natural geothermal aquifer in Desert Hot Springs, California. Professor Nakamura's student and protégé Dr Kotaro Kawaguchi relocated from Japan as chief research scientist and working with Sebastian Thomas, an algae cultivation expert from India, they refined desert-grown spirulina into consumable powder using the world's first 90,000 sq ft (8,400 m^{2}) solar heated dryer.

While a staff of 40 ran the Southern California "Green Gold Farms," harvesting its own U.S.-grown spirulina for Light Force, Hills built a 13,000-square-foot (1,200 m^{2}) home/laboratory on a mountain in the redwoods of Boulder Creek, California, dedicated to researching neutraceuticals and as a gathering place for scientists, innovators and spiritual "map makers". Three years after moving to the new home Norah Hills died (on December 14, 1995) from Alzheimers.

=== False health claims ===
Hill and his company Microalgae International were accused of making false health claims about spirulina. In March 1982, Microalgae International was charged with making unsubstantiated claims about spirulina and paid $225,000 to settle a suit brought by the California Department of Health Services’ food and drug branch. Michael Bogumill of the Health Services Department's food and drug branch commented that "they were making claims that could not be substantiated and that had no basis in fact--such as spirulina was potent and (had) magical qualities, when the potency did not amount to a hill of beans".

== Santa Cruz sanctuary ==
At the property he built a video production studio to produce films on Enlightenment and, through new media, to inspire people to celebrate what he called the "Divine Goddess". This property was sold by his widow Penny Slinger Hills in August 2017. In 1996 Christopher Hills married Penelope ("Penny") Slinger (born October 21, 1947). Their marriage took place on the grounds of a spiritual retreat center (hidden deep in a grove of redwood trees in the Santa Cruz Mountains, near Boulder Creek, California) Christopher had built and dedicated to the honor and service of the Divine Feminine. Christopher and Penny were married on the deck of the main building at this spiritual retreat center. On October 25, 2000, Penny became an ordained Minister of the Universal Church of the Master. Shortly thereafter, she converted Christopher's spiritual retreat center into an auxiliary church of the Universal Church of the Master. She named this auxiliary church The Goddess Temple.

In 1996, after three decades of globetrotting, Hills visited Vietnam to invest in a naturally carbonated underground spring water venture. He contracted a virus which caused a deterioration of his health. Light Force and the research company Biogenics were sold to Royal Body Care which continued to market the products.

Christopher Hills died at home January 31, 1997 leaving his wife Penny Slinger Hills, two sons and four grandchildren.

Hills' estate is being stewarded by Coongie, a non-profit research institute.

== Selected publications ==
- The Power of Increased Perception—Philosophical Library New York, 1958
- Kingdom of Desire—Philosophical Library New York, 1959
- Supersenonics—The Science of Radiational Paraphysics, ISBN 0-916438-18-X (1975)
- Nuclear Evolution: Discovery of the Rainbow Body (2nd ed.), ISBN 0-916438-12-0 (1977) (hardcover)
- Food from Sunlight—Planetary Survival for Hungry People, ISBN 0-916438-13-9 (1978)
- Rise of the Phoenix—Universal Government by Nature's Laws, ISBN 0-916438-04-X (1979)
- The Golden Egg, ISBN 0-916438-32-5 (1979)
- Creative Conflict—The Secret to Heart-to-Heart Communication, ISBN 0-916438-36-8 (1980)
- The Christ Book, ISBN 0-916438-32-5 (1982)
- Spirulina—Food for a Hungry World, ISBN 0-916438-47-3 (1982)
- Instruments of Knowing—Human Biological Sensitivity, ISBN 0-916438-22-8 (1985)
- The Book of Vision, ISBN 978-0-916438-63-0 (1995)
