= Arun Kumar Sagar =

Member of the 17th Lok Sabha

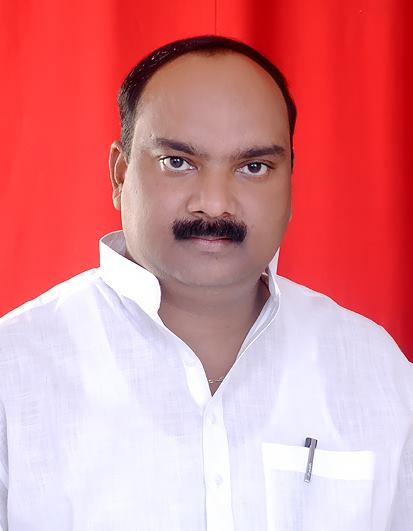

Member of Parliament, Lok Sabha
- Incumbent
- Assumed office 25 May 2019
- Preceded by: Krishna Raj
- Constituency: Shahjahanpur

Personal details
- Born: 1 May 1976 (age 50) Shahjahanpur, India
- Party: Bharatiya Janata Party
- Other political affiliations: Bahujan Samaj Party
- Spouse: Rupa Sagar
- Children: 3
- Profession: Agriculture and business

Arun Kumar Sagar is an Indian politician.He currently serves as a second term Member of Lok Sabha for Shahjahanpur since 2019.

== Political career ==
Arun Kumar Sagar, BJP MP from Shahjahanpur, was earlier a Bahujan Samaj Party BSP's popular youth leader of Jatav Community in western UP. He was four times District President of Shahjahanpur District and two times bareilly Zone Co-ordinator of the party's unit. In 2008 at the age of 32 he became the vice-president of the state construction corporation (status of MoS UP Government).In 2012 he contested the Powayan constituency on a BSP ticket and lost to SP"s candidate Shakuntla Devi by the margin of 4.2 percentage of votes. On 15 June 2015, he was fired by his party for anti-party activities.

After leaving Bahujan Samaj Party, Sagar immediately joined the Bharatiya Janata Party. In 2015, he was made the vice-president of the party's Braj region unit.

In March 2019, Bharatiya Janata Party announced that Sagar would contest the upcoming general election from the Shahjahanpur Lok Sabha constituency. He replaced sitting MP and union minister Krishna Raj. On 23 May, he was elected to the Lok Sabha, after defeating Amar Chand Jauhar of Mahagathbandhan, his nearest rival by a margin of 268,418 votes. Which was biggest margin in Rohilkhand. Sagar was polled 688,990 votes.
