= Sharad Vir Singh =

Indian politician

MLA, 17th Legislative Assembly
- In office 2017–2022
- Constituency: Jalalabad, Shahjahanpur district

Personal details
- Party: Bhartiya Janata Party
- Parent: Udayvir Singh
- Education: Gandhi Faiz-E-Aam College, Mahatma Jyotiba Phule Rohilkhand University
- Occupation: MLA
- Profession: Politician

Sharad Vir Singh is an Indian politician and a member of the 17th Legislative Assembly of Uttar Pradesh of India. He represents the Jalalabad constituency of Uttar Pradesh and is a member of the Bhartiya Janata Party.

== Political career ==
Singh was elected as MLA for the 3rd time in 2017. In 1996, he won the election 1st time, and in 2002, he again won the election from jalalabad. In the 2007 and 2012 Assembly elections, he lost by a small margin. Singh has been a member of the 17th Legislative Assembly of Uttar Pradesh. Since 2017, he has represented the Jalalabad constituency and is a member of the SP.

== Posts held ==
| # | From | To | Position | Comments |
|---|---|---|---|---|
| 01 | 2017 | 2022 | Member, 17th Legislative Assembly | |
| 02 | 2002 | 2007 | Member, 14th Legislative Assembly | |
| 03 | 1996 | 2002 | Member, 13th Legislative Assembly | |

== See also ==
- Uttar Pradesh Legislative Assembly
