= Amkhariya =

Village in Bareilly division, Uttar Pradesh

Amkhiriya
- Village
- Country: India
- State: Uttar Pradesh
- Division: Bareilly
- Block: Amariya

Population
  - Total: 2,100
- Zip code: 262001

Amkhiriya is a village in Block Amariya, Tehsil and District Pilibhit in the Indian state of Uttar Pradesh. Amkhiriya have some British Government historical Building. These British Government Buildings served as guest houses for British army and other British employees during the pre-independence era. The Village is Surrounded by 3 sides covered by the rivers

== Demographics ==
Amkhiriya has a total population of about 2100. Hindi is the most spoken Language in the village.

Amkheriya Has A Long River which runs through many other villages

== Location ==
Amkhiriya belongs to Bareilly division. It is located 15 km from District headquarters Pilibhit. and 280 km from State capital Lucknow.

Amkhiriya's nearest villages include Amkhera ( 1 km ), Dang ( 3 km ), Dhakiya ( 5 km ), Imamnagar ( 2 km ), Adoli ( 4 km ), Sirsi (3 km), Chaka (5 km ), Sahgawan Nagria(2 km) and Nisra (4 km) are the nearby Villages of Amkhiriya. Amkhiriya is surrounded by Lalaurikhera Tehsil towards South, Pilibhit Tehsil towards East, Damkhauda Tehsil towards west, Nawabganj Tehsil towards South.

Shahi Rail Way Station and Laluri Khera Rail Way Station are the very nearby railway stations to Amkhiriya. However Bareilly Rail Way Station is major railway station 52 km near to Amkhiriya.

== Education ==
Schools & Colleges in Amkhiriya

- GM Inter College

Colleges near Amkhiriya

- K.j.s.h.s.s Uganpurmarauri Bisalpur
- Banke Bihari Ram Inter College
- Upadhi Mahavidyalaya
- Bismillah College
