= Katra Assembly constituency =

Constituency of the Uttar Pradesh legislative assembly in India

Katra
- Constituency No. 131 for the Uttar Pradesh Legislative Assembly

Constituency details
- Country: India
- Region: North India
- State: Uttar Pradesh
- District: Shahjahanpur
- Total electors: 292,322 (2012)
- Reservation: None

Member of Legislative Assembly
- 18th Uttar Pradesh Legislative Assembly
- Incumbent Veer Vikram Singh
- Party: Bharatiya Janata Party
- Elected year: 2017

Katra Assembly constituency is one of the 403 constituencies of the Tilhar Uttar Pradesh Legislative Assembly, India. It is a part of the Shahjahanpur district and one of the five assembly constituencies in the Shahjahanpur Lok Sabha constituency. First election in this assembly constituency was held in 2012 after the "Delimitation of Parliamentary Tilhar and Assembly Constituencies Order, 2008" was passed and the constituency was formed in 2008. The constituency is assigned identification number 131.

== Wards / Areas ==
Extent of Katra Assembly constituency is KCs Kheda Bajheda, Jalalpur, Katra, Khudaganj NP, Katra NP of Tilhar Tehsil & KC Paraur of Jalalabad Tehsil.

== Member of the Legislative Assembly ==
Term	Name	Party	From	To	Days	Comments	Ref
16th Vidhan Sabha	Rajesh Yadav	Samajwadi Party	Mar-2012	2017	-	-	
17th Vidhan Sabha	Veer Vikram Singh	Bharatiya Janata Party	2017	2022	-	-	
18th Vidhan Sabha	Veer Vikram Singh	Bharatiya Janata Party	Mar-2022	Incumbent	-	-	

== Election results ==
=== 2027 ===
2027 Uttar Pradesh Legislative Assembly election: Katra
Party	Candidate	Votes	%	±%
INDIA				
NDA				
BSP				
NOTA	None of the above			
Majority				
Turnout				
gain from		Swing		

=== 2022 ===
2022 Uttar Pradesh Legislative Assembly election: Katra
Party	Candidate	Votes	%	±%
BJP	Veer Vikram Singh	77,800	39.9	▲0.26
SP	Rajesh Yadav	77,443	39.72	▲8.75
INC	Munna Singh	17,504	8.98	
BSP	Rajesh Kashyap	15,236	7.81	▼16.79
NOTA	None of the above	1,091	0.56	▼0.4
Majority		357	0.18	▼8.49
Turnout		194,967	57.55	▼3.92
BJP hold		Swing		

=== 2017 ===
2017 Uttar Pradesh Legislative Assembly Election: Katra
Party	Candidate	Votes	%	±%
BJP	Veer Vikram Singh	76,509	39.64	
SP	Rajesh Yadav	59,779	30.97	
BSP	Rajeev Kashyap	47,471	24.6	
NOTA	None of the above	1,830	0.96	
Majority		16,730	8.67	
Turnout		192,992	61.47	

=== 2012 ===
16th Vidhan Sabha: 2012 General Elections

2012 General Elections: Katra
Party	Candidate	Votes	%	±%
SP	Rajesh Yadav	51,025	27.51	−
BSP	Rajeev Kashyap	50,150	27.04	−
INC	Virendra Pratap Singh	31,400	16.93	−
	Remainder 17 candidates	52,874	28.5	−
Majority		875	0.47	−
Turnout		185,449	63.44	−
SP hold		Swing		

== See also ==
- Tilhar Assembly constituency
- Shahjahanpur district
- Shahjahanpur Lok Sabha constituency
- Sixteenth Legislative Assembly of Uttar Pradesh
- Uttar Pradesh Legislative Assembly
- Vidhan Bhawan
