= Tilokpur =

Tilokpur, Tilhar
- village
- Location in Uttar Pradesh, India Tilokpur, Tilhar (India)
- Coordinates: 27.58°N 79.46°E
- Country: India
- State: Uttar Pradesh
- District: Shahjahanpur

Government
  - Body: Gram panchayat
- Elevation: 152 m (499 ft)

Languages
  - Official: Hindi
- Time zone: UTC+5:30 (IST)

Tilokpur is a village in the Tilhar in the Indian state of Uttar Pradesh. The village is situated near the Sharda Canal that passes through Kant and Kurriya Kalan.

The village is medium-sized, with around 167 dwellings and a population of about 1,036 people. Banwari Lal, an Indian revolutionary and an approver in the historical Kakori conspiracy train robbery case of 1925, hailed from this village. Later in his life, he settled in the nearby village of Keshawpur, where he lived until his death.

== History ==
The village of Tilokpur, named after Trilok Chandra, a Bachhil Rajput, is situated about 9 kilometers to the south of Tilhar. According to the Shahjahanpur Gazetteer, the name Tilhar was also derived from the Bachhil Rajput Trilok Chandra. Trilok Chandra also built a fort in Tilhar. The ruins of this fort can be seen in Dataganj mohalla of Tilhar. There were three big gates to the fort though now only two of them still exist. The city of Shahjahanpur was established by Diler Khan and Bahadur Khan, sons of Shri Dariya Khan, who were the commanders in the army of Mugal Emperor Jahangir.

== Demographics ==
Although this village is very old, many residents have moved and settled in other parts of the country due to communal conflicts. In the past, this village apparently had orchards with rare plant species and people lived in harmony. Today the village is all but abandoned.

The Hindu communities which still reside here are: Thakurs, Brahmins, Yadavs, Lohars, Barhais, Dhobis, Dahanuks Nats and Kahars. Amongst the Muslim community, some families of Manihars, Julahas and Faqirs remain in the village.

Another community of Kshatriya Sunars, who were the oldest residents of this village, have left. Kayasthas have also left the village though some families of Gadariyas remain. The departures are often due to the lack of educational opportunities.

The main occupation of the villagers is farming.

== Religious practices ==
Sacred fig trees grow in Tilokpur. These trees draw both Sadhus (ascetics), who meditate beneath the trees, and Hindus, who do pradakshina (circumambulation) around the trees as a form of worship. Usually seven pradakshinas are done in the morning, while the Hindu practitioner chants "Vriksha Rajaya Namah", meaning "salutation to the king of trees."

Outside the village's boundary stands a Peepal tree, which the local people call Brahma dev. Here, a mela (gathering) is organised on the day of Buddha Purnima every year. This sacred tree is said to be about 1,000 years old. Its trunk is about 10 feet in diameter, upon which the natural images of Brahma, Vishnu, and Mahesh are clearly visible.

The Brijbasi Nats – a landless community in Shahjahanpur district – are mainly musicians and dancers. At social functions, they are required to perform for their patrons, who tend to belong to the locally dominant castes. They come here every year and perform dances with music to entertain the Brahma dev and the people on Buddha Purnima.
