= Shahjahanpur Lok Sabha constituency =

Constituency of the Indian parliament in Uttar Pradesh

Coordinates: 27.88°N 79.92°E

Shahjahanpur UP-27
- Lok Sabha constituency
- Interactive Map Outlining Shahjahanpur Lok Sabha constituency

Constituency details
- Country: India
- Region: North India
- State: Uttar Pradesh
- Assembly constituencies: Katra; Jalalabad; Tilhar; Powayan; Shahjahanpur; Dadraul
- Established: 1962
- Reservation: SC

Member of Parliament
- 18th Lok Sabha
- Incumbent Arun Kumar Sagar
- Party: Bharatiya Janata Party
- Elected year: 2024

Shahjahanpur Lok Sabha constituency is one of the 80 Lok Sabha (parliamentary) constituencies in Uttar Pradesh state in northern India.

== Assembly segments ==
Presently, Shahjahanpur Lok Sabha constituency comprises six Vidhan Sabha (legislative assembly) segments. These segments are:

Assembly seat no.	Assembly seat name	District	Party	2024 Lead
131	Katra	Shahjahanpur	BJP	BJP
132	Jalalabad	Shahjahanpur	BJP	SP
133	Tilhar	Shahjahanpur	BJP	SP
134	Powayan (SC)	Shahjahanpur	BJP	BJP
135	Shahjahanpur	Shahjahanpur	BJP	BJP
136	Dadraul	Shahjahanpur	BJP	BJP

== Members of Parliament ==
Year	Member	Party
1962	Prem Krishna Khanna	Indian National Congress
1967	Prem Krishna Khanna	Indian National Congress
1971	Jitendra Prasad	Indian National Congress
1977	Surendra Vikram	Janata Party
1980	Jitendra Prasad	Indian National Congress
1984	Jitendra Prasad	Indian National Congress
1989	Satyapal Singh Yadav	Bharatiya Janata Party
1991	Satyapal Singh Yadav	Bharatiya Janata Party
1996	Rammurti Singh Verma	Samajwadi Party
1998	Satyapal Singh Yadav	Bharatiya Janata Party
1999	Jitendra Prasad	Indian National Congress
2004	Jitin Prasada	Indian National Congress
2009	Mithlesh Kumar	Samajwadi Party
2014	Krishna Raj	Bharatiya Janata Party
2019	Arun Kumar Sagar	Bharatiya Janata Party
2024	Arun Kumar Sagar	Bharatiya Janata Party

== Election results ==
=== 2024 ===
2024 Indian general election: Shahjahanpur
Party	Candidate	Votes	%	±%
BJP	Arun Kumar Sagar	592,718	47.50	▼10.59
SP	Jyotsna Gond	5,37,339	43.06	▲43.06
BSP	Dod Ram Verma	91,710	7.35	▼28.11
NOTA	None of the Above	8,490	0.68	▼0.08
Majority		55,379	4.44	▼18.19
Turnout		12,47,902	53.52	▼2.63
BJP hold		Swing		

=== 2019 ===
2019 Indian general election: Shahjahanpur
Party	Candidate	Votes	%	±%
BJP	Arun Kumar Sagar	688,990	58.09	+11.64
BSP	Amar Chandra Jauhar	4,20,572	35.46	+9.84
INC	Brahm Swaroop Sagar	35,283	2.97	+0.58
CPI	Manish Chandra Kori	9,464	0.8	
NOTA	None of the Above	9,037	0.76	−0.12
Majority		2,68,418	22.63	+1.8
Turnout		11,87,133	56.15	
BJP hold		Swing		

=== 2014 ===
2014 Indian general election: Shahjahanpur
Party	Candidate	Votes	%	±%
BJP	Krishna Raj	525,132	46.45	+25.20
BSP	Umed Singh Kashyap	2,89,603	25.62	+2.09
SP	Mithlesh Kumar	2,42,913	21.49	−10.94
INC	Chetram	27,011	2.39	−11.32
PECP	Sunita Sujata Nagpal	12,945	1.14	−2.10
NOTA	None of the Above	9,964	0.88	+0.88
Majority		2,35,529	20.83	+11.93
Turnout		11,30,569	57.12	+8.44
BJP gain from SP		Swing	+14.02	

=== 2009 ===
2009 Indian general election: Shahjahanpur
Party	Candidate	Votes	%	±%
SP	Mithlesh Kumar	257,033	32.43	
BSP	Sunita Singh	1,86,454	23.53	
BJP	Krishna Raj	1,68,434	21.25	
INC	Umed Singh Kashyap	1,08,682	13.71	
PECP	Daulatram	25,680	3.24	
NCP	Dr. Jauhari Lal	11,016	1.39	
Majority		70,579	8.90	
Turnout		7,92,508	48.68	
SP gain from INC		Swing		

== See also ==
- Shahjahanpur district
- List of constituencies of the Lok Sabha
