= Veer Vikram Singh =

Indian politician

Dr. Veer Vikram Singh "Prince"
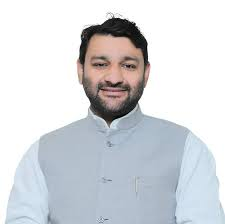
- Dr. Veer Vikram Singh - MLA

Member of the Uttar Pradesh legislative assembly
- In office 2017 – Till Date (2nd Term)
- Preceded by: Rajesh Yadav
- Constituency: Katra, Shahjahanpur district

Personal details
- Born: Dabhora Simra, Shahjahanpur
- Party: Bharatiya Janata Party
- Education: Scindia School
- Profession: Politician, Business & Agriculturist

Veer Vikram Singh, also known as "Prince", is an Indian politician of the Bharatiya Janata Party and a member of the 18th Uttar Pradesh Legislative Assembly. His native village is Dhabora Simra, Tehsil Tilhar Shahjahanpur.

== Political career ==
Singh was elected to the 18th Legislative Assembly of Uttar Pradesh in 2017 from the Katra constituency and has retained this seat consecutively second term (First term-2017-2022) defeating his opponent. He is one of the youngest members representing the Legislative assembly of the Bharatiya Janata Party.

== Early life and education background ==
Singh hails from a strong political family of region and his father - Virendra Pratap Singh was four-time MLA from Tilhar-Shahjhanpur. Veer Vikram Singh started early education at Mumukshu Ashram in Shahjahanpur and then later at the Scindia School at Fort Gwalior. He completed his B.Com. from University of Delhi.

== Posts held ==
S.No	From	To	Position	Comments
1	2022	Incumbent	Member, 18th Legislative Assembly	2nd Term - consecutively elected - UP - Legislative Assembly
2	2022	Incumbent	Member of Estimate Committee - UP Vidhansabha	Uttar Pradesh - Legislative Assembly
3	2017	2022	Member, 17th Legislative Assembly	1st Term- Young MLA elected to 17th Assembly of UP
4	2017	2022	Member of Delegation Legislative Committee	Uttar Pradesh - Legislative Assembly
5	2014	2016	Member of State Advisory Committee of National Fertilizer Corporation	Member- Uttar Pradesh SAC_NFC
6	2008	2012	Member of Censor Board of India, Delhi	
