= Rajesh Yadav =

Rajesh Yadav may refer to:

- Rajesh Yadav (cinematographer), Indian cinematographer
- Rajesh Yadav (Uttar Pradesh politician) (born 1969)
- Rajesh Yadav (Madhya Pradesh politician)
- Rajesh Yadav (cricketer) (born 1965), Indian cricketer
