= Majduddin =

Indian Muslim theologian (died 1813)

Mullah Majduddin Baḥr al-ʿUlūm
- ملّا مجد الدین

Head Preceptor of the Calcutta Mohammedan College
- In office 1781–1791
- Preceded by: Post established
- Succeeded by: Muhammad Ismail

Personal life
- Born: Shahjahanpur
- Died: 1813
- Flourished: 18th-century
- Known for: First Alia Madrasa principal
- Other names: Madan Shahjahanpuri

Religious life
- Religion: Islam
- Denomination: Sunni
- Jurisprudence: Hanafi

Muslim leader
- Teacher: Wahhaj ad-Din Gupamawi; Qazi Mubarak; Shah Waliullah
- Based in: Bareilly; Calcutta
- Students: Salamat Ullah Kashfi

Majd ad-Dīn al-Madanī (Arabic: مجد الدین المدنی; d. 1813), also known as Madan Shāhjahānpūrī (Arabic: مدن شاہجہانپوری), was an 18th-century Indian Muslim theologian. He served as the first principal of the Calcutta Madrasa, the first Alia Madrasa of Bengal.

== Early life and education ==
Majduddin was born in the 18th century to Tahir al-Husayni in Shahjahanpur, greater Bareilly, North India. He studied under Shaykh Wahhaj ad-Din in Gopamau, Hardoi, who was also the teacher of Muhammad Salih Bengali, It ialso said that Majduddin was a student of Qazi Mubarak, as well as being a senior student of Shah Waliullah Dehlawi, the erstwhile Imam al-Hind. In addition to Islamic jurisprudence, Majduddin was trained in rhetoric and logic.

== Career ==
In the last quarter of the 18th century, British administrators realised that it was essential to learn the various religious, social, and legal customs and precedents of the subcontinent in order to better manage its administration. As part of this initiative, Warren Hastings, the inaugural Governor-General of the Presidency of Fort William, founded the Calcutta Mohammedan College in October 1780. Mullah Majduddin visited Calcutta in September, where he had a large following. On 21 September, several Muslims requested Hastings to use his influence to employ Majduddin as a teacher at the madrasa. Thus, Majduddin became the madrasa's first head preceptor, serving that role for roughly a decade. He is often credited for introducing the Dars-i Nizami, a popular Islamic curriculum of North India, to Bengal and neighbouring lands, although students of Nizamuddin Sihalivi had reached Bengal, such as Abdul Ali Bahrul Ulum (teacher of Ghulam Mustafa Burdwani). He formulated the syllabus of the madrasa. Alongside fundamental Islamic teachings and jurisprudence, he also included the teaching of mathematics, logic and philosophy. The activities of the Madrasa-i-Alia were undertaken in his own home for the first seven months. During this time, he received a monthly wage of 300 takas as the madrasa's principal.

In 1791, Majduddin was removed following an investigation conspired by the British Collector of 24 Parganas accusing him of alleged mismanagement. Following his dismissal from Calcutta, Majduddin found employment as the Qadi of Lucknow, under the Nawab of Awadh Saadat Ali Khan II. However, under political circumstances, he left this career and returned to Bareilly, where he began teaching Islamic jurisprudence at the Dargah of Hafizul Mulk. One of his notable students of Bareilly was Salamat Ullah Kashfi. Majduddin died in 1813.
