= Hari Prakash Verma =

Member of the Uttar Pradesh Legislative Assembly

Member of Uttar Pradesh Legislative Assembly
- Incumbent
- Assumed office March 2022
- Preceded by: Sharadveer Singh
- Constituency: Jalalabad

Personal details
- Born: 2 February 1980 (age 46) Shahjahanpur, Uttar Pradesh
- Party: Bharatiya Janata Party
- Spouse: Amita Verma
- Children: 2
- Parent: Siyaram Verma (father)
- Education: Bachelor of Laws
- Alma mater: M.J.P. Rohilkhand University
- Occupation: Lawyer
- Profession: Politician

Hari Prakash Verma is an Indian politician, lawyer, and a member of the 18th Uttar Pradesh Assembly from the Jalalabad Assembly constituency of Shahjahanpur district. He is a member of the Bharatiya Janata Party.

== Early life ==
Hari Prakash Verma was born on 2 February 1980 in Shahjahanpur, Uttar Pradesh, to a Hindu Lodhi family of Siyaram Verma. He married Amita Verma on 25 April 2008, and they had two children.

== Education ==
Hari Prakash Verma completed his education with a Bachelor of Law at Krishna College of Law, Bijnor, affiliated with Mahatma Jyotiba Phule Rohilkhand University, Bareilly, in 2006.

== Posts held ==
#	From	To	Position	Comments
01	2022	Incumbent	Member, 18th Uttar Pradesh Assembly	

== See also ==
- 18th Uttar Pradesh Assembly
- Jalalabad Assembly constituency
- Uttar Pradesh Legislative Assembly
