= Banthra =

Banthra Tilhar is a village in Tilhar Tehsil and Tilhar City of Uttar Pradesh in India.

It is also known as बंथरा Banthara.

== Transportation ==
It is home to the Banthra train station in the Moradabad railway division of the Northern Railway zone. Highway 30 passes through the village.
