= Mithlesh Kumar =

Indian politician

Member of Parliament, Rajya Sabha
- Incumbent
- Assumed office 5 July 2022
- Constituency: Uttar Pradesh

Member of Parliament, Lok Sabha
- In office 2009–2014
- Preceded by: Jitin Prasada
- Succeeded by: Krishna Raj
- Constituency: Shahjahanpur

Personal details
- Born: 5 November 1964 (age 61). Agona Bujurag, Shahjahanpur, Uttar Pradesh, India.
- Citizenship: Indian
- Party: Bharatiya Janata Party
- Spouse: Sakuntla Devi
- Children: 3
- Education: Bareilly College
- Occupation: Social worker, Politician
- Committees: Committee on Information Technology (Member); Absence of Members for the Sitting of the House (Member); Consultative Committee on Civil Aviation.

Mithlesh Kumar is an Indian politician and a former member of the 15th Lok Sabha of India. He represented the Shahjahanpur constituency of Uttar Pradesh and is a member of the Samajwadi Party (SP) political party. Shahjahanpur constituency was reserved seat for Scheduled caste category.

== Personal life ==
Kumar holds B.Sc. degree from Bareilly College in Uttar Pradesh. He was a social worker before joining politics. He married Sakuntla Devi in 1987. They have two sons and a daughter.

== Posts Held ==
#	From	To	Position
01	2002	2009	Member, Uttar Pradesh Legislative Assembly (two terms)
02	2004	2005	Minister of State Panchayti Raj, Government of Uttar Pradesh
03	2009	-	Elected to 15th Lok Sabha
04	2009	-	Member, Committee on Information Technology
05	2010	-	Member, Absence of Members for the Sitting of the House
06	2010	-	Member, Consultative Committee on Civil Aviation
07	2022	-	Elected Unopposed to Rajya Sabha

== See also ==
- List of members of the 15th Lok Sabha of India
