= Penny Slinger =

British-born American artist and author (born 1947)

- Born: October 21, 1947 (age 79); London
- Education: Chelsea College of Arts
- Style: Sexual mysticism
- Movement: Surrealism, Feminist surrealism
- Spouse: Christopher Hills (m. 1996; died 1997)
- Website: pennyslinger.com

Penny Slinger, sometimes Penelope Slinger (born 1947), is a British-born American artist and author based in California. As an artist, she has worked in different mediums, including photography, film and sculpture. Her work has been described as being in the genres of surrealism and feminist surrealism. Her work explores the nature of the self, the feminine and the erotic.

== Work ==
=== Early Surrealist period 1969–1977 ===
Slinger attended Farnham (now West Surrey) College of Art from 1964 to 1966. She studied at the Chelsea College of Arts in London where she made a series of short films that were later shown at Anthology Film Archives in 2019. She completed her degree with a First Class Honours Diploma in Art and Design in 1969. She was accepted into the Royal College of Art Film post graduate course, but did not take it up.

While writing her thesis on the collage books of Max Ernst, she met Sir Roland Penrose who became her patron for many years and introduced her to Max Ernst. Penrose brought Slinger's art to the attention of Mario Amaya, who included her sculpture in the exhibition Young and Fantastic at the Institute of Contemporary Art in 1969.

Slinger worked in photographic collage, producing her first book 50% The Visible Woman. Published in 1969, the book continued her practice, started in her student days, of using herself as a muse and consists of a photo collage overlaid with her poetry. When published in 1971, Rolling Stone said, '"This book will become as important on your bookshelf as Sgt. Pepper is on your record rack."

In 1970 Slinger and filmmaker Peter Whitehead filmed and photographed at Lilford Hall, a decaying mansion in Northamptonshire, England. Although their film project remained unrealised, the photos formed the basis of Slinger's surreal journey of self-discovery told in the style of a photo romance. The result, An Exorcism, was published in 1977 with a grant from Roland Penrose and Lee Miller's Elephant Trust. The Lilford Hall footage also resurfaced and was shown at Blum and Poe Gallery, Los Angeles 2014, as part of History Is Now at the Haywood Gallery, 2015, and at Anthology Film Archives, and Fortnight Institute, New York, 2019.

In 1971 Slinger had her first solo exhibition at Angela Flowers Gallery, London, featuring assemblages of lifecasts of her head and transformed dolls. Art critic Peter Fuller, '"Penny Slinger's work is a documentation of the role of one woman in a world still dominated by concepts of male superiority....she emerges as one of the most active and socially relevant artists around."

Slinger focused on surrealism in the 1960s and the 1970s to "plumb the depths of the feminine psyche and subconscious," according to a review in ArtDaily magazine. She wrote and illustrated numerous publications. She staged photographs, sometimes using her own body, to create "hauntingly surreal collages" for a series which she titled An Exorcism. She photographed herself naked to explore ideas relating to dreams, desire, sex, female liberation, surrealism and memory. Some of her art focused on the Arawak peoples of South America and the Caribbean.

Reviewer Kate Kellaway in The Guardian described her work as a "grotesque and militant contribution" with a "loud message about silence." As an author, with Nik Douglas, her book Sexual Secrets sold 100,000 copies, and sold over a million copies in 19 translations. In 1977 she published "The Secret Dakini Oracle", a deck of cards for divination. With Douglas and Bhaskar Bhattacharya, she wrote The Path of the Mystic Lover - Baul Songs of Passion and Ecstasy in 1993, and provided 84 drawings for it. Slinger's work was part of the Angels of Anarchy exhibit at the Manchester Art Gallery in 2009.

=== Theater, film and feminism 1971 -1973 ===
In 1971 Slinger joined the first British all women theatre troupe, Holocaust, directed by Jane Arden because she said she wanted to contribute her talents to something bigger than herself, and the intentions of the group felt in alignment with her own resolve to delve deeply into and express the unearthed realms of the feminine psyche. They performed A New Communion for Freaks, Prophets and Witches at the Open Space Theater London and at the Edinburgh Festival in 1971.

Slinger created masks for the surrealist play Lying Figures by Francis Warner, premiered at Edinburgh Festival 1971. She was design collaborator with Carolee Schneemann on The Four Little Girls by Pablo Picasso, at the Open Space Theater London, 1971.

In 1972 Slinger participated in the controversial cult classic, The Other Side of the Underneath, directed by Jane Arden and shot on location in Wales. It was the only British feature film to be directed by a woman in the 1970s. Slinger had a major performing role and co art directed the movie. The British Film Institute DVD booklet for the film said, "The Other Side of the Underneath isn’t a work to love. It is a work to admire, to puzzle through and to wrestle with."

In the same year Slinger opened her second solo exhibition at Angela Flowers gallery, Opening. The invitation depicted her as a wedding cake, the exhibits consisted of a series of table tops and mouthpieces, as well as the Bride’s Cake photo series. The exhibition's themes of food and female eroticism can be seen in subsequent Feminist art. Laura Mulvey stated in Spare Rib, '"Is there feminine phantasy?...Penny Slinger's recent exhibition provided graphic images of phantasy that only a woman could have produced', 'Opening showed us how powerfully a woman is able to transform Surrealism."

=== Tantra ===
==== Tantra Publications ====
In 1975 Jane Arden introduced Penny Slinger to Nik Douglas. They subsequently published a number of books together, including:

===== Mountain Ecstasy =====
Mountain Ecstasy, published in 1978, contains 64 full-color collages and poetry which combines Penny's Surrealist roots with Tantric symbolism.

===== Secret Dakini Oracle =====
Published in 1977 as a divination card deck and in 1978 as a book.

===== Sexual Secrets, The Alchemy of Ecstasy =====
Sexual Secrets, The Alchemy of Ecstasy was co written with Nik Douglas and published in 1979. It contains over 600 drawings by Penny Slinger. It has 19 language translations and an anniversary edition in 2000.

=== Tantric themes ===
Slinger had been working on using the Xerox copying machine to make mono prints of her face and body since she was teaching at Portsmouth College of Art in 1973. By 1976 she had manifested a group of images using this technique called Scrolls which were her response to the ‘Chakra Man’ motif in classical Tantric Art. During the mid seventies Slinger's three-dimensional work included a series of doll house like sculptures which blended Surreal and Tantric themes. In 1977 she exhibited the work at Patrick Seale Gallery, London, and at the Mirandy Gallery, London.

In 1982 she had a retrospective exhibition of her Tantric work called, Visions of Ecstasy at Visionary Gallery, New York.

=== Caribbean and Arawak Art 1980–1994 ===
In 1980 Slinger and Douglas moved to the Caribbean, first to Tortola, British Virgin Islands, then to Anguilla, where she lived until 1994. She decided to use her talents to contribute to the local culture. Her work with archaeology led her to create a series of over 100 paintings, pastels and block prints depicting Arawak people, the indigenous, original inhabitants of the islands, and their lifestyle. She also made a series of detailed drawings of Arawak artifacts. During this time Slinger opened her own gallery, created a series of historical murals for permanent installation at the airport and designed two sets of stamps.

Her film Visions of the Arawaks was released in 1994 and consisted of a poetic and artistic journey into the spirit of a people through Penny’s painting and pastels.

=== Northern California and the Divine Feminine (1994–2017) ===
Slinger lived with Dr. Christopher Hills in Boulder Creek, California, until Hills’ death in 1997. Slinger continued to live on the northern California property until 2017, dedicating the property to the arts, inviting the creative people of the region to participate in many events she hosted over the years. In this period Penny worked in photography, video and audio. In 2010 she published the 64 Dakini Oracle which depicted archetypal forms of the Divine Feminine in digital collage. During this time she also made a series of large assemblages utilizing life casts of her own body in relationship to many items she had collected and interacted with entitled The Alchemy of Stuff.

=== Dior (2019–2022) ===
In 2019, Slinger was invited by Maria Grazia Chiuri, creative director at Dior, to transform the historical building at 30 Avenue Montaigne, Paris for the last fashion show before the building underwent renovation as part of the Dior Megastore. With the help of her creative partner Dhiren Dasu and Dior's creative team, she covered the walls, floors and ceilings of the interior with digital collages representing the elements, made four life size 3D modeled sculptures and hung a large lenticular composed of women's faces on the facade of the building. The project represented an artistic alchemy of the edifice. Slinger also designed the last look of the haute couture show, a gold leafed wearable doll house based on 30 Avenue Montaigne. In 2021/2022, Slinger collaborated with Dior again to produce a gold handbag for the Lady Dior collection, also based on the historic Parisian facade of the Dior headquarters.

=== Pandemic Art (2020) ===
Slinger created a series of photo collages during the Pandemic (2020) entitled My Body In a Box. This series documents the personal and collective feelings of this period and featured her own naked body as part of her current practice addressing ageism.

=== Rediscovery of early works ===
2009 marked a renewed interest in Penny’s early work after her inclusion in the Angels of Anarchy exhibition at Manchester Art Museum and in The Dark Monarch – Magic & Modernity in British Art at Tate St. Ives in 2009.

Penny Slinger-Out of the Shadows, 2017, is a documentary by Richard Kovitch focusing on Penny’s life and work in the 1960s and 1970s, revealing the pioneering nature of her work.

From 2018 Penny has resided in Los Angeles where she has been working on a series of large format prints of digital collages utilizing her own body as a body of experience. This series is engaged with her practice to use her body as her muse at this senior age to confront ageism which she considers the next bastion of feminism.

== Personal life ==
Penny Slinger was partners with filmmaker Peter Whitehead from 1969 to 1972.

She was partners with Tantric scholar Nik Douglas 1975–1993. They traveled together to Asia in the mid-1970s, moved to New York then the Caribbean from 1980 to 1993.

Slinger was married to microbiologist Christopher Hills, the co-discoverer of the protein-rich plankton spirulina and co-founder of the University of the Trees in Boulder Creek, California. Hills died in 1997 at age 70.

Since 2001, Slinger has worked with her creative partner, multidisciplinary artist Dhiren Dasu.

== Exhibitions ==
=== Solo exhibitions ===
2022 50% Unboxed, Pace Gallery, New York, NY, USA

2021 50/50, Blum & Poe Gallery, Los Angeles, CA, USA

2019 Penny Slinger: Tantric Transformations, Richard Saltoun Gallery, London, UK

2018 Inside Out Fortnight Institute, New York, NY, USA

2017 Sex Work, (solo booth, @ Frieze Art Show), Blum & Poe Gallery, London, UK

2015 Self Impressions, Riflemaker, London, UK

2015 Penny Slinger, Blum and Poe Gallery, Tokyo, Japan

2014 Penny Slinger, Blum and Poe Gallery, Los Angeles, CA, USA

2012 Exorcism Revisited, Broadway 1602 Gallery, New York, NY, USA

2012 Hear What I Say, Riflemaker Gallery, London, UK

2011 A Photo Romance, Riflemaker Gallery, London, UK

1993 Arawak Renaissance – The Tribute Continues, New World Gallery, Anguilla.

1992 Amerindians- Studies of a Lost People, Cotton Gin Art Gallery, Anguilla

1982 Visions of Ecstasy, Visionary Gallery, New York, NY, USA

1977 Secrets, Mirandy Gallery, London, UK

1977 Inner Vision, Patrick Seale Gallery, London, UK

1973 exhibition Opening, Angela Flowers Gallery, London, UK

1971 solo exhibition at the Angela Flowers Gallery, London, UK

=== Group exhibitions ===
2022 A Feminist Avant-Garde, Les Rencontres de la Photographie, Arles, France

2022 Punk is Coming, MOKA Westport, USA

2022 Black Book Presents: A Woman's Right to Pleasure, Sotheby's Gallery, Los Angeles, CA, USA

2021 Scarlet Women, Atelier Melusine, Chateau Mareuil, La Trimouille, France

2021 Oh Marilyn, Gazelli Art House, London, UK

2021 The Dream of the Fisherman's Wife, Ruttkowski 68, Paris, France

2020 Some of the Hole, Simian gallery, Copenhagen, Denmark

2020 LESS Festival of Contemporary Collage, Viborg, Denmark

2020 The Botanical Mind: Art, Mysticism and the Cosmic Tree, Camden Arts Center, London, UK

2020 Tantra: Enlightenment To Revolution, British Museum, London, UK

2020 The Enchanted Interior, Guildhall, London, UK

2020 Bodily Objects, Richard Saltoun Gallery, London, UK

2019 House of the Sleeping Beauties, Sothebys S/2, London, UK

2018 Visible Women, Norwich Castle Museum & Art Gallery, Norwich, UK

2018 The Hired Grievers, curated by Jason Dodge, Galeria Madragoa, Lisbon, Portugal

2018 Virginia Woolf:: An Exhibition Inspired by Her Writings, Tate St Ives, Cornwall, UK

2018 The House of Fame, convened by Linder, Nottingham Contemporary, Nottingham, UK

2018 Worship of Sticks and Stones, Anat Ebgi, Los Angeles, CA, USA

2018 Paris Photo, Richard Saltoun Gallery, Grand Palais, Paris, France

2017 Dreamers Awake, White Cube Gallery, London, UK

2017 Women House, Monnaie de Paris, Paris, France; traveled to National Museum in the Arts, Washington D.C., USA

2017 The Beguiling Siren is Thy Crest, The Museum of Modern Art in Warsaw, Poland

2017 Room, Sadie Coles, London, UK

2016 The One Fest Goa, India

2016 Inaugural Exhibition, Broadway 1602, New York, NY

2016- 2017 Feminist Avant-Garde of the 1970s, works from the Verbund Collection, Photographers' Gallery, London

2015 Photo London, Somerset House, London, Riflemaker Booth

2015 Art 15, Olympia, London

2015 History Is Now, Hayward Gallery, London.

2015 Thea Porter - 70s Bohemian Chic, Fashion & Textile Museum, London.

2015 The Feminist Avant-Garde of the 1970s, Hamburger Kunsthalle, Hamburg

2014 Woman, Bozar Centre for Fine Arts, Brussels.

2014 Paris Photo, Paramount Studios, Los Angeles.

2014 Cry Me a River, Etoile Polaire Lodge #1, New Orleans, LA

2014 I:MAGE 2014- Travelling with Unfamiliar Spirits, Fulgur Esoterica, London

2013 Lips Painted Red, Trondheim Kunstmuseum, Norway

2011 Threat, Broadway 1602, New York.

2009 The Dark Monarch, Tate Gallery, St Ives

2009 Angels of Anarchy, Manchester Art Museum

1993 Presentes Caraibes - 500 Years of Amerindian History, Fort Delgres, Guadeloupe.

1992 Addressing the Forbidden, Edinburgh Art Festival.

1982 Imaginary Images, Floating Foundatiopn of Photography, New York.

1982 Rated X, Neikrug Gallery, New York

1982 Erotic Art Photography, Jacques Baruch Gallery, Chicago.

1978 Surrealism and Company in this Decade, Camden Arts Center, London.

1978 Metamorphosis, University of Cambridge, England.

1974 Nude and Naked, Nicholas Treadwell Gallery, London

1973 Exhibited in the 12th Bienal de São Paulo

1969 Young and Fantastic Institute of Contemporary Arts, London, UK

=== Upcoming Group Exhibitions ===
2022 Joan Didion, What She Means, Hammer Museum, Los Angeles, CA, USA

2022 Sensitive Content, Unit Gallery, London, UK

2022-2023 The Horror Show, Somerset House, London, UK

2023 Body Poetic, Giant, Bournemouth, UK

== Publications ==
- '50% The Visible Woman', collages and poetry by Penelope Slinger, Empty Eye, 1971. ISBN 978-0903136006
- An Exorcism''—a book of surreal photo-collage by Penny Slinger, with introduction by Sir Roland Penrose, Villiers publications, 1977.
- 'The Book of Matan' Automatic Writings from the Brink of Eternity edited by Nik Douglas, illustrated by Penny Slinger, Spearman Books, 1977. ISBN 978-0854352142
- 'Mountain Ecstasy' - full color collages and poetry by Penny Slinger and Nik Douglas, Dragons Dream, 1978. ISBN 978-9063325015
- 'Secret Dakini Oracle' divination card deck by Penny Slinger and Nik Douglas, US Games and Systems 1977. ISBN 978-0913866894
- 'Secret Dakini Oracle' book by Nik Douglas and Penny Slinger, Destiny Books, 1979. ISBN 978-0892810055
- 'Sexual Secrets: The Alchemy of Ecstasy' by Nik Douglas and Penny SLinger, including more than 600 line drawings by Ms. Slinger. 1979, Destiny Books. ISBN 978-0892810109.
- 'The Pillow Book' by Nik Douglas and Penny Slinger, Destiny Books, 1981. ISBN 978-0892810192, ISBN 978-0892810376
- 'The Erotic Sentiment in the Paintings of India and Nepal', Nik Douglas and Penny SLinger, Inner Traditions, 1989. ISBN 978-0892812080
- 'The Erotic Sentiment in the Paintings of China and Japan', Nik Douglas and Penny Slinger, Inner Traditions, 1990. ISBN 978-0892814954, ISBN 978-0892813797
- 'The Path of the Mystic Lover—Baul Songs of Passion and Ecstasy' by B. Bhattacharya with Nik Douglas and Penny Slinger: Cover and 84 original drawings by Penny, Destiny Books, 1993. ISBN 978-0892810192
- Anniversary edition of 'Sexual Secrets-The Alchemy of Ecstasy', by Nik Douglas and Penny Slinger, Destiny Books, 2000. ISBN 9780892818051
- 'Tantric Dakini Oracle', boxed set cards and book, by Nik Douglas and Penny Slinger, Destiny Books, 2001. ISBN 978-0892811373
