= Parashurampuri, Shahjahanpur =

Town in Uttar Pradesh, India

Parashurampuri Jalalabad
- City
- Location in Uttar Pradesh, India Parashurampuri (India)
- Coordinates: 27.72°N 79.78°E
- Country: India
- State: Uttar Pradesh
- District: Shahjahanpur
- Elevation: 133 m (436 ft)

Population (2011)
  - Total: 38,202

Languages
  - Official: Hindi
- Time zone: UTC+5:30 (IST)
- Postal code: 242221
- Vehicle registration: UP 27
- Website: up.gov.in

Parashurampuri (formerly Jalalabad) is a town near Shahjahanpur City and a municipal board in Shahjahanpur district of the Indian state Uttar Pradesh.

On 20 August 2025, the Government of India approved the renaming of Jalalabad to Parashurampuri.

== Geography ==
Parashurampuri is located at 27.12°N 79.78°E. It has an average elevation of 133 metres (436 feet).

== Demographics ==
As of the 2001 India census, the town had a population of 31,112. Males constitute 53% of the population and females 49%. Literacy rate is 60%: male literacy 70%, female literacy 51%. About 15% of the population is under 6 years of age.

Religions in Parashurampuri
Religion	Percent
Hindus	58%
Muslims	41%
Jains	0.5%
Others†	0.5%
Distribution of religions †Includes Sikhs (0.2%), Buddhists (<0.2%).
