= Krishna Raj =

Indian politician (born 1967)

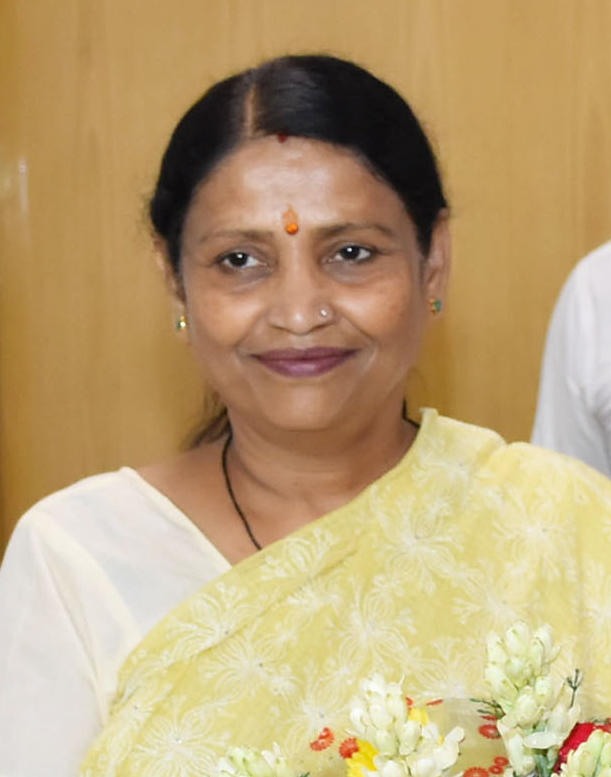

Minister of State for Agriculture & Farmers Welfare, Government of India
- In office July 2015 – 24 May 2019
- Succeeded by: Kailash Choudhary

Member of Parliament, Lok Sabha
- In office 16 May 2014 – 23 May 2019
- Preceded by: Mithlesh Kumar
- Succeeded by: Arun Kumar Sagar
- Constituency: Shahjahanpur

Personal details
- Born: 22 February 1967 (age 59) Faizabad, Uttar Pradesh, India
- Party: Bharatiya Janata Party
- Spouse: Virendra Kumar
- Children: 2 children
- Profession: Politician,
- As of 15 October, 2015

Krishna Raj (born 22 February 1967) is an Indian politician and having affiliations with Bharatiya Janata Party (BJP) who is the former Union Minister of State of Agriculture & Farmers Welfare, India. She was elected to Uttar Pradesh assembly in 1996 & 2007 from Mohammadi seat. She contested 2014 Lok Sabha elections from Shahjahanpur seat of Uttar Pradesh as BJP / NDA candidate and elected to 16th Lok Sabha.

== Early life and education ==
Krishna Raj was born in Faizabad, Uttar Pradesh on 22 February 1967 to Ram Dulare and Sukh Rani. She completed her Master of Arts (M.A.) degree from Dr. Ram Manohar Lohia Avadh University, Faizabad.

== Positions held ==
- 1996-2002: Member, Uttar Pradesh Legislative Assembly.
- 2007-2012: Member, Uttar Pradesh Legislative Assembly (second term).
- 14 May 2014 Elected to 16th Lok Sabha.
- 1 Sep. 2014-5 July 2016:

↔Member, Committee on Petitions. ↔Member, Standing Committee on Energy. ↔Member, Consultative Committee, Ministry of Rural Development, Panchayati Raj and Ministry of Drinking Water and Sanitation

- 13 May 2015 – 5 July 2016: Member, Joint Committee on the Right to Fair Compensation and Transparency in Land Acquisition, Rehabilitation and Resettlement (Second Amendment) Bill, 2015.
- 1 May 2016 – 5 July 2016: Member, Committee on Public Undertakings.
- 5 July 2016: Union Minister of State of Women and Child Development, India.
- 4 September 2017: Union Minister of State of Agriculture & Farmers Welfare, India.
