= Tilhar Assembly constituency =

Constituency of the Uttar Pradesh legislative assembly in India

Tilhar
- Constituency No. 133 for the Uttar Pradesh Legislative Assembly

Constituency details
- Country: India
- Region: North India
- State: Uttar Pradesh
- District: Shahjahanpur
- Total electors: 355,825
- Reservation: None

Member of Legislative Assembly
- 18th Uttar Pradesh Legislative Assembly
- Incumbent Salona Kushwaha
- Party: Bharatiya Janata Party
- Elected year: 2022

Tilhar Assembly constituency is one of the 403 constituencies of the Uttar Pradesh Legislative Assembly, India. It is a part of the Shahjahanpur district and one of the five assembly constituencies in the Shahjahanpur Lok Sabha constituency. First election in this assembly constituency was held in 1957 after the "DPACO (1956)" (delimitation order) was passed in 1956. After the "Delimitation of Parliamentary and Assembly Constituencies Order" was passed in 2008, the constituency was assigned identification number 133.

== Wards / Areas ==
Extent of Tilhar Assembly constituency is KC Badagaon of Powayan Tehsil; KCs Tilhar, Nigohi & Tilhar MB of Tilhar Tehsil.

== Members of the Legislative Assembly ==
#	Term	Name	Party	From	To	Days	Comments	Ref
01	01st Vidhan Sabha	-	-	Mar-1952	Mar-1957	1,849	Constituency not in existence	
02	02nd Vidhan Sabha	Balak Ram	Independent	Apr-1957	Mar-1962	1,800	-	
03	03rd Vidhan Sabha	Bhagwan Sahai	Independent	Mar-1962	Mar-1967	1,828	-	
04	04th Vidhan Sabha	Surendra Vikram	Indian National Congress	Mar-1967	Apr-1968	402	-	
05	05th Vidhan Sabha	Surendra Vikram	Indian National Congress	Feb-1969	Mar-1974	1,832	-	
06	06th Vidhan Sabha	Satya Pal Singh Yadav	Bharatiya Jana Sangh	Mar-1974	Apr-1977	1,153	-	
07	07th Vidhan Sabha	Satya Pal Singh Yadav	Indian National Congress	Jun-1977	Feb-1980	969	-	
08	08th Vidhan Sabha	Satya Pal Singh Yadav	Janata Party (Secular)	Jun-1980	Mar-1985	1,735	-	
09	09th Vidhan Sabha	Satya Pal Singh Yadav	Lok Dal	Mar-1985	Nov-1989	1,725	-	
10	10th Vidhan Sabha	Surendra Vikram	Indian National Congress	Dec-1989	Apr-1991	488	-	
11	11th Vidhan Sabha	Satya Pal Singh Yadav	Janata Dal	Jun-1991	Dec-1992	533	-	
12	12th Vidhan Sabha	Virendra Pratap Singh	Indian National Congress	Dec-1993	Oct-1995	693	-	
13	13th Vidhan Sabha	Virendra Pratap Singh	Indian National Congress	Oct-1996	May-2002	1,967	-	
14	14th Vidhan Sabha	Virendra Pratap Singh	Indian National Congress	Feb-2002	May-2007	1,902	-	
15	15th Vidhan Sabha	Rajesh Yadav	Samajwadi Party	May-2007	Mar-2012	1,762	-	
16	16th Vidhan Sabha	Roshan Lal Verma	Bahujan Samaj Party	Mar-2012	Mar-2017	-	-	
17	17th Vidhan Sabha	Roshan Lal Verma	Bharatiya Janata Party	Mar-2017	Mar-2022	-	-	
18	18th Vidhan Sabha	Salona Kushwaha	Bharatiya Janata Party	Mar-2022				

== Election results ==
=== 2027 ===
2027 Uttar Pradesh Legislative Assembly election: Tilhar
Party	Candidate	Votes	%	±%
INDIA				
NDA				
BSP				
NOTA	None of the above			
Majority				
Turnout				
gain from		Swing		

=== 2022 ===
2022 Uttar Pradesh Legislative Assembly election: Tilhar
Party	Candidate	Votes	%	±%
BJP	Salona Kushwaha	102,307	47.93	▲7.9
SP	Roshan Lal Verma	89,030	41.71	
BSP	Nawab Faizan Ali Khan	12,290	5.76	▼9.62
INC	Rajnish Gupta	3,082	1.44	▼35.8
NOTA	None of the above	772	0.36	▼0.47
Majority		13,277	6.22	▲3.43
Turnout		213,455	59.99	▼1.78
BJP hold				

=== 2017 ===
2017 Uttar Pradesh Legislative Assembly election: Tilhar
Party	Candidate	Votes	%	±%
BJP	Roshan Lal Verma	81,770	40.03	
INC	Jitin Prasada	76,065	37.24	
BSP	Avadhesh Kumar Verma	31,418	15.38	
RLD	Pradip Kumar	3,983	1.95	
NOTA	None of the above	1,683	0.83	
Majority		5,705	2.79	
Turnout		204,249	61.77	
BJP gain from BSP		Swing	+3.75	

=== 2012 ===
U. P. Assembly Election, 2012: Tilhar
Party	Candidate	Votes	%	±%
BSP	Roshan Lal Verma	71,122	36.28	−
SP	Anwar Ali Rahman	60,415	30.82	−
INC	Sunita Kovid	37,113	18.93	−
BJP	Ragini Singh	6,905	3.52	−
MD	Shiv Sharma	6,185	3.16	−
PECP	Seema Kumari	6,159	3.14	−
Majority		10,707	5.46	−
Turnout		1,96,030	65.57	−
Registered electors		298,950		
BSP gain from SP		Swing	-	

== See also ==
- Shahjahanpur district
- Shahjahanpur Lok Sabha constituency
- Sixteenth Legislative Assembly of Uttar Pradesh
- Uttar Pradesh Legislative Assembly
- Vidhan Bhawan
