= Nigohi, Shahjahanpur =

Town in Uttar Pradesh, India

Nigohi
- Town
- Location within Uttar Pradesh Location within India
- Coordinates: 28°06′07″N 79°52′14″E
- Country: India
- State: Uttar Pradesh
- District: Shahjahanpur
- Tehsil: Tilhar

Government
  - Type: Sarpanch

Area
  - Total: 4.12 km^{2} (1.59 sq mi)
- Elevation: 160 m (520 ft)

Population (2011)
  - Total: 18,523
  - Density: 4,500/km^{2} (11,600/sq mi)
- Time zone: UTC+5:30 (IST)
- PIN: 242407

Nigohi is a town in Tilhar Tehsil, Shahjahanpur District, Uttar Pradesh, India. It is situated on the northern part of Shahjahanpur District, about 25 kilometres north of the district capital Shahjahanpur, and 20 kilometres northeast of the tehsil capital Tilhar. In the year 2011, the town has a population of 18,523.

== Name ==
According to Paul Whalley, the name Nigohī represents a contracted form of nyagrodha, a nickname for the banyan tree.

== Geography ==
Nigohi is located on the southern bank of Kaimua River. It is bounded by the village of Patrajpur to the north, the village of Kaveerpur Sotupur to the east, the village of Mishripur to the south, and the village of Paidapur to the west. Its average elevation is 160 metres above the sea level.

== Climate ==
According to the Köppen Climate Classification, Nigohi has a Humid Subtropical Climate. Its wettest month is July, with 309 mm of average rainfall; and the driest month is November, with 3 mm of average rainfall.

Climate data for Nigohi
Month	Jan	Feb	Mar	Apr	May	Jun	Jul	Aug	Sep	Oct	Nov	Dec	Year
Mean daily maximum °C (°F)	20.4 (68.7)	24 (75)	30.2 (86.4)	36.5 (97.7)	38.1 (100.6)	36.4 (97.5)	31.9 (89.4)	31.3 (88.3)	31 (88)	30.4 (86.7)	27 (81)	22.3 (72.1)	30.0 (85.9)
Daily mean °C (°F)	14.1 (57.4)	17.5 (63.5)	23 (73)	29.1 (84.4)	31.7 (89.1)	31.6 (88.9)	28.6 (83.5)	28 (82)	27.2 (81.0)	24.7 (76.5)	20.4 (68.7)	15.6 (60.1)	24.3 (75.7)
Mean daily minimum °C (°F)	8.4 (47.1)	11.4 (52.5)	15.8 (60.4)	21.3 (70.3)	24.9 (76.8)	26.6 (79.9)	25.8 (78.4)	25.5 (77.9)	23.9 (75.0)	19 (66)	14.1 (57.4)	9.6 (49.3)	18.9 (65.9)
Average rainfall mm (inches)	25 (1.0)	37 (1.5)	21 (0.8)	16 (0.6)	20 (0.8)	129 (5.1)	309 (12.2)	269 (10.6)	152 (6.0)	22 (0.9)	3 (0.1)	13 (0.5)	1,016 (40.1)
Source: Climate-Data.org

== Demographics ==
As of 2011, Nigohi has a total of 3,194 households. Out of the 18,523 residents, 9,767 are male and 8,756 are female. Its literacy rate is 52.28%, with 5,847 of the male population and 3,836 of the female population being literate. The town's census location code is 133945.
