= Satyapal Singh Yadav =

Indian politician

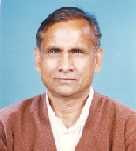
Lt. Satyapal Singh Yadav

Satyapal Singh was a former minister of state in Government of India. He was a minister in the Atal Bihari Vajpayee government from 1998 to 1999 and held the portfolio of food and consumer affairs. He was elected as MLA 5 times from Tilhar constituency, 3 times to Lok Sabha from Shahjahanpur in Uttar Pradesh, he was also in the list of Chief Minister candidate but lost the MLA election only by 137 votes . He married Shakuntala Yadav and has 3 children (2 sons Rajesh Yadav and Amit Yadav and 1 daughter Shashi Prabha ).

He was born in 1942 at village Siura (Katra) and passed MA and LLM from Lucknow University. He entered politics soon after studies and was elected to Uttar Pradesh Legislative Assembly in 1974 from the seat of Tilhar. He was elected as Leader of Opposition in The Uttar Pradesh Legislative Assembly.

He changed political parties at will and was a member of Bharatiya Janata Party, Samajwadi Party, Janata Dal. His mentor was Chaudhari Charan Singh and later Ajit Singh.

He died on 23 July 2004. His sons entered politics after his death. His son is former MLA from Tilhar on a Samajwadi Party ticket and a current MLA from Katra.

Rajesh Yadav won MLA election in 2007 and 2012 from Katra Constituency of Shahjahanpur District and Amit Yadav won MLC elections from Pilibhit Shahjahanpur.

== Biography ==
Father's Name: Shri Chet Ram Singh Yadav

Date of Birth: 1 July 1942

Marital Status: Married on 25 May 1964

Spouse's Name: Smt. Shakuntla Yadav

Children: Two sons and one daughter

Educational Qualifications

M.A., LL.M.

Educated at Lucknow University, Lucknow (Uttar Pradesh)

Profession

Agriculturist, lawyer, political and social worker

== Positions held ==
1974-89: Member, Uttar Pradesh Legislative Assembly

1977-80: Member, Public Accounts Committee

1981-84: Member, Committee on Public Undertakings

1987-89: Leader of Opposition, Uttar Pradesh Legislative Assembly

1989: Elected to 9th Lok Sabha

1990: Member, Advisory Committee on Environment, and Railway Committee

Member, Consultative Committee, Ministry of Communications

1991: Re-elected to 10th Lok Sabha (2nd term)

Member, Committee on Petitions

Member, Consultative Committee, Ministry of Communications

1998: Re-elected to 12th Lok Sabha (3rd term)

19 March 1998 onwards: Union Minister of State, Food and Consumer Affairs

Social and Cultural Activities

Opening of schools in rural and backward areas; helping victims of flood, fire, natural calamities and atrocities committed by the police

Favourite Pastimes and Recreation

Reading, horticulture, music, travelling and meeting the people

Sports and Clubs

Yoga and walking

Other Information

Member, Lok Dal, 1980–90

== Early and personal life ==
He was born in village Siura, district Shahjahanpur, Uttar Pradesh.
