= Shahjahanpur Assembly constituency =

Constituency of the Uttar Pradesh legislative assembly in India

Coordinates: 27.8825°N 79.9158°E

Shahjahanpur
- Constituency No. 135 for the Uttar Pradesh Legislative Assembly

Constituency details
- Country: India
- Region: North India
- State: Uttar Pradesh
- District: Shahjahanpur
- Lok Sabha constituency: Shahjahanpur
- Total electors: 3,59,008 (2017)
- Reservation: None

Member of Legislative Assembly
- 18th Uttar Pradesh Legislative Assembly
- Incumbent Suresh Kumar Khanna
- Party: Bharatiya Janata Party
- Elected year: 2022

Shahjahanpur Assembly constituency is one of the 403 constituencies of the Uttar Pradesh Legislative Assembly, India. It is a part of the Shahjahanpur district and one of the five assembly constituencies in the Shahjahanpur Lok Sabha constituency. First election in this assembly constituency was held in 1952 after the "DPACO (1951)" (delimitation order) was passed in 1951. After the "Delimitation of Parliamentary and Assembly Constituencies Order" was passed in 2008, the constituency was assigned identification number 135.

== Wards / Areas ==
Extent of Shahjahanpur Assembly constituency is KC Nagar, Shahjahanpur CB, Shahjahanpur (MB+OG) & Rly. Settlement Roza NP of Shahjahanpur Tehsil.

== Members of the Legislative Assembly ==
Year	Member	Party
1952	Habib-ur-Rehman	Indian National Congress
1957	Ashfaq Ali	Independent
1959^	Sardar Darshan Singh	Independent
1962	Mohammad Rafi Khan	Indian National Congress
1967	Mohammad Rafi Khan	Indian National Congress
1969	Uma Shankar Shukla	Bharatiya Jana Sangh
1974	Mohammad Rafi Khan	Indian National Congress (O)
1977	Mohammad Rafi Khan	Janata Party
1980	Nawab Sikander Ali Khan	Indian National Congress (I)
1985	Nawab Sikander Ali Khan	Indian National Congress
1989	Suresh Khanna	Bharatiya Janata Party
1991	Suresh Khanna	Bharatiya Janata Party
1993	Suresh Khanna	Bharatiya Janata Party
1996	Suresh Khanna	Bharatiya Janata Party
2002	Suresh Khanna	Bharatiya Janata Party
2007	Suresh Khanna	Bharatiya Janata Party
2012	Suresh Khanna	Bharatiya Janata Party
2017	Suresh Khanna	Bharatiya Janata Party
2022	Suresh Khanna	Bharatiya Janata Party

== Election results ==
=== 2027 ===
2027 Uttar Pradesh Legislative Assembly election: Shahjahanpur
Party	Candidate	Votes	%	±%
INDIA				
NDA				
BSP				
NOTA	None of the above			
Majority				
Turnout				
gain from		Swing		

=== 2022 ===
2022 Uttar Pradesh Legislative Assembly election: Shahjahanpur
Party	Candidate	Votes	%	±%
BJP	Suresh Kumar Khanna	109,942	48.98	+0.09
SP	Tanveer Khan	100,629	44.83	+5.26
BSP	Sarvesh Chandra Dhandhu Mishra	8,726	3.89	−4.14
NOTA	None of the above	966	0.43	−0.13
Majority		9,313	4.15	−5.17
Turnout		224,447	54.57	−2.84
BJP gain from SP		Swing		

=== 2017 ===
U. P. Legislative Assembly Election, 2017: Shahjahanpur
Party	Candidate	Votes	%	±%
BJP	Suresh Kumar Khanna	100,734	48.89	
SP	Tanveer Khan	81,531	39.57	
BSP	Mohammad Aslam Khan	16,546	8.03	
NOTA	None of the above	1,151	0.56	
Majority		19,203	9.32	
Turnout		206,025	57.39	
BJP hold		Swing		

=== 2012 ===
U. P. Legislative Assembly Election, 2012: Shahjahanpur
Party	Candidate	Votes	%	±%
BJP	Suresh Kumar Khanna	81,581	45.00	
SP	Tanveer Khan	65,403	36.08	
BSP	Mohammad Aslam Khan	19,936	11.00	
INC	Nawab Faizan Ali Khan	6,055	3.34	
CPI	Mohammad Saleem	1,791	0.99	
Majority		16,178	8.92	
Turnout		1,81,284	58.76	
BJP hold		Swing		

== See also ==
- Shahjahanpur district
- Shahjahanpur Lok Sabha constituency
- Sixteenth Legislative Assembly of Uttar Pradesh
- Uttar Pradesh Legislative Assembly
- Vidhan Bhawan
