= Jalalabad, Uttar Pradesh Assembly constituency =

Constituency of the Uttar Pradesh legislative assembly in India

Jalalabad
- Constituency No. 132 for the Uttar Pradesh Legislative Assembly

Constituency details
- Country: India
- Region: North India
- State: Uttar Pradesh
- District: Shahjahanpur
- Total electors: 367,857 (2022)
- Reservation: None

Member of Legislative Assembly
- 18th Uttar Pradesh Legislative Assembly
- Incumbent Hari Prakash Verma
- Party: Bharatiya Janata Party
- Elected year: 2022

Jalalabad Assembly constituency is one of the 403 constituencies of the Uttar Pradesh Legislative Assembly, India. It is a part of the Shahjahanpur district and one of the five assembly constituencies in the Shahjahanpur Lok Sabha constituency. First election in this assembly constituency was held in 1952 after the "DPACO (1951)" (delimitation order) was passed in 1951. After the "Delimitation of Parliamentary and Assembly Constituencies Order" was passed in 2008, the constituency was assigned identification number 132.

== Wards/Areas ==
Extent of Jalalabad Assembly constituency is KCs Jalalabad, Allhaganj, Kalan, Mirzapur, Jalalabad MB & Allahganj NP of Jalalabad Tehsil.

== Members of the Legislative Assembly ==
#	Term	Name	Party	From	To	Days	Comments	Ref
01	01st Vidhan Sabha	Ram Gulam Singh	Indian National Congress	Mar-1952	Mar-1957	1,849	-	
02	02nd Vidhan Sabha	Har Chandra Singh	Independent	Apr-1957	Mar-1962	1,800	-	
03	03rd Vidhan Sabha	Kesho Singh	Indian National Congress	Mar-1962	Mar-1967	1,828	-	
04	04th Vidhan Sabha	Dal Singh Yadav	Bharatiya Jana Sangh	Mar-1967	Apr-1968	402	-	
05	05th Vidhan Sabha	Keshav Chandra Singh	Indian National Congress	Feb-1969	Mar-1974	1,832	-	
06	06th Vidhan Sabha	Dal Singh Yadav	Bharatiya Jana Sangh	Mar-1974	Apr-1977	1,153	-	
07	07th Vidhan Sabha	Kanhai Singh	Independent	Jun-1977	Feb-1980	969	-	
08	08th Vidhan Sabha	Udaivere Singh	Indian National Congress (I)	Jun-1980	Mar-1985	1,735	-	
09	09th Vidhan Sabha	Udaivere Singh	Indian National Congress	Mar-1985	Nov-1989	1,725	-	
10	10th Vidhan Sabha	Ram Murti Singh	Janata Dal	Dec-1989	Apr-1991	488	-	
11	11th Vidhan Sabha	Ram Murti Singh	Janata Party	Jun-1991	Dec-1992	533	-	
12	12th Vidhan Sabha	Ram Murti Singh	Samajwadi Party	Dec-1993	Oct-1995	693	-	
13	13th Vidhan Sabha	Sharad Vir Singh	Samajwadi Party	Oct-1996	May-2002	1,967	-	
14	14th Vidhan Sabha	Sharad Vir Singh	Samajwadi Party	Feb-2002	May-2007	1,902	-	
15	15th Vidhan Sabha	Neeraj Kushwaha	Bahujan Samaj Party	May-2007	Mar-2012	1,762	-	
16	16th Vidhan Sabha	Neeraj Kushwaha	Bahujan Samaj Party	Mar-2012	Mar-2017	-	-	
17	17th Vidhan Sabha	Sharad Vir Singh	Samajwadi Party	Mar-2017	Mar-2022			
18	18th Vidhan Sabha	Hari Prakash Verma	Bhartiya Janta Party	Mar-2022	Incumbent	-	-	

== Election results ==
=== 2027 ===
2027 Uttar Pradesh Legislative Assembly election: Jalalabad
Party	Candidate	Votes	%	±%
INDIA				
NDA				
BSP				
NOTA	None of the above			
Majority				
Turnout				
gain from		Swing		

=== 2022 ===
2022 Uttar Pradesh Legislative Assembly election: Jalalabad
Party	Candidate	Votes	%	±%
BJP	Hari Prakash Verma	99,609	45.97	+14.28
SP	Neeraj Kushwaha	95,037	43.86	+7.7
BSP	Anirudh Singh Yadav	16,057	7.41	−20.59
NOTA	None of the above	1,258	0.58	−0.2
Majority		4,572	2.11	−2.36
Turnout		216,688	59.04	−1.81
BJP gain from Samajwadi party		Swing		

=== 2017 ===
2017 Uttar Pradesh Legislative Assembly Election: Jalalabad
Party	Candidate	Votes	%	±%
SP	Sharad Vir Singh	75,326	36.16	
BJP	Manoj Kashyap	66,029	31.69	
BSP	Neeraj Kushwaha	58,337	28.0	
NOTA	None of the above	1,614	0.78	
Majority		9,297	4.47	
Turnout		208,332	60.85	

=== 2012 ===
16th Vidhan Sabha: 2012 Elections

2012 General Elections: Jalalabad
Party	Candidate	Votes	%	±%
BSP	Neeraj Kushawaha	76,406	37.97	−
SP	Sharad Vir Singh	75,856	37.69	−
INC	Anil Kumar Singh Verma	29,992	14.9	−
	Remainder 8 candidates	18,988	9.43	−
Majority		550	0.27	−
Turnout		201,242	66.77	−
BSP hold		Swing		

== See also ==
- Shahjahanpur district
- Shahjahanpur Lok Sabha constituency
- Sixteenth Legislative Assembly of Uttar Pradesh
- Uttar Pradesh Legislative Assembly
- Vidhan Bhawan
