= Roshan Lal Verma =

Indian politician

MLA, 16th Legislative Assembly
- In office Mar 2007 – 2012
- Preceded by: Anukool Duvedi (Jindpura Nigohi)
- Succeeded by: Anukool Duvedi
- Constituency: Tilhar
- In office 2012–2017

Personal details
- Born: 26 March 1963 (age 63) Shahjahanpur district
- Party: Samajwadi Party
- Other political affiliations: Bahujan Samaj Party; Bharatiya Janata Party
- Spouse: Bhanumati Verma
- Children: 8 (3 sons, and 5 daughters)
- Parent: Moolaram Verma (father)
- Education: Adarsh Inter College
- Profession: Politician; Farmer

Roshan Lal Verma is an Indian politician and a member of the Seventeenth Legislative Assembly of Uttar Pradesh in India. He represents the Tilhar constituency of Uttar Pradesh and is a member of the Samajwadi Party.

== Early life and education ==
Roshan Lal Verma was born in Shahjahanpur district. He attended the Adarsh School and is educated till eighth grade.

== Political career ==
Roshan Lal Verma has been a MLA for three terms. He represented the Tilhar constituency and was a member of the political party, Bahujan Samaj Party. Later he joined Bhartiya Janta Party until 2021.

In 2022 he joined Samajwadi Party.

== Members of Legislative Assembly ==
He was elected in 2007 as Member, 15th Legislative Assembly of Uttar Pradesh and re-elected in 2012 for 16th Legislative Assembly of Uttar Pradesh and again in 2017 as Member, 17th Legislative Assembly.

== Electoral performance ==
U. P. Assembly Election, 2012: Tilhar
Party	Candidate	Votes	%	±%
BSP	Roshan Lal Verma	71,122	36.28	−
SP	Anwar Ali Rahman	60,415	30.82	−
INC	Sunita Kovid	37,113	18.93	−
BJP	Ragini Singh	6,905	3.52	−
MD	Shiv Sharma	6,185	3.16	−
PECP	Seema Kumari	6,159	3.14	−
Majority		10,707	5.46	−
Turnout		1,96,030	65.57	−
Registered electors		298,950		
BSP gain from SP		Swing	-	

== See also ==
- Tilhar (Assembly constituency)
- Sixteenth Legislative Assembly of Uttar Pradesh
- Uttar Pradesh Legislative Assembly
