= Rajesh Yadav (Uttar Pradesh politician) =

Indian politician

Rajesh Yadav राजेश यादव

MLA, 16th Legislative Assembly
- Incumbent
- Assumed office March 2012
- Preceded by: None
- Constituency: Katra

MLA, 15th Legislative Assembly
- In office 7 May – 12 March
- Preceded by: Virendra Pratap Singh
- Succeeded by: Roshan Lal Verma
- Constituency: Tilhar

Personal details
- Born: 21 November 1969 (age 56) Shahjahanpur district
- Party: Samajwadi Party
- Spouse: Anjana Yadav
- Children: 2 sons: Jayant Yadav and Abhay Yadav
- Parent: Late Satyapal Singh Yadav (Father) Late Shakuntala Yadav (Mother)
- Education: Guru Nanak Dev Engineering College; Swami Sukhdevanand Law College
- Profession: Politician and farmer

Rajesh Yadav (Hindi: राजेश यादव) is an Indian politician and member of the Sixteenth Legislative Assembly of Uttar Pradesh in India. He represents the Katra constituency of Uttar Pradesh and is a member of the Samajwadi Party.

== Early life and education ==
Rajesh Yadav was born in Shahjahanpur district. He attended the Guru Nanak Dev Engineering College and Swami Sukhdevanand Law College and attained Bachelor of Engineering & Bachelor of Laws degrees.

== Political career ==
Rajesh Yadav has been a MLA for two terms. He represented the Katra constituency and is a member of the Samajwadi Party political party.

He lost his seat in the 2017 Uttar Pradesh Assembly election to Veer Vikram Singh Prince of the Bharatiya Janata Party.

== Posts held ==
#	From	To	Position	Comments
01	2012	2017	Member, 16th Legislative Assembly	
02	2007	2012	Member, 15th Legislative Assembly	

== See also ==
- Katra (Assembly constituency)
- Sixteenth Legislative Assembly of Uttar Pradesh
- Tilhar (Assembly constituency)
- Uttar Pradesh Legislative Assembly
