= Katra, Shahjahanpur =

Miranpur Katra Katra, Tehsil Tilhar
- Katra Teh.Tilhar Uttar Pradesh
- Interactive map of Miranpur Katra
- Coordinates: 28.0353°N 79.6755°E
- Country: India
- State: Uttar Pradesh
- Sub District: Tilhar

Government
  - M.L.A.: Mr.Veer Vikram Singh (Prince) (BJP)
  - Chairman: Dr.Pooja Kasana

Population (2011)
  - Total: 32,440

Languages
  - Official: Khariboli, Hindi, Urdu, Punjabi
- Time zone: UTC+5:30 (IST)
- PIN codes: 242301
- Area code: 05841
- Vehicle registration: UP-27
- Website: https://shahjahanpur.nic.in/

Miranpur Katra is a Vidhan Sabha constituency in Tehsil Tilhar in the Indian state of Uttar Pradesh. The town is located 47 kilometres (30 mi) east of the Bareilly, on the main Lucknow–Delhi National Highway 24.Its situated at midpoint which is connecting 3 major cities Lucknow-Kanpur-Delhi Mr.Veer Vikram Singh is the current MLA from BJP. Dr Pooja Kasana is the current chairperson of Katra.

== History ==
The First Rohilla War of 1773–1774 was a punitive campaign by Shuja-ud-Daula, Nawab of Awadh, against the Rohillas, Afghan highlanders settled in Rohilkhand, northern India. The Nawab was supported by troops of the British East India Company, in a successful campaign brought about by the Rohillas reneging on a debt to the Nawab.The Rohillas under Hafiz Rahmat Ali Khan were defeated by Colonel Alexander Champion in April 1774. The decisive battle, in which Hafiz Rahmat Khan died, was at Miranpur Katra, Tilhar on 23 April. Later, for very short period of time, it came under the control of Marathas.

== Demographics ==
As of 2011 India census Katra Nagar Panchayat population has population of 32,440 of which 17,229 are males while 15,211 are females as per. The population of children aged 0-6 is 4976 which is 15.34% of total population of Katra (NP). In Katra Nagar Panchayat, the female sex ratio is 883 against state average of 912. Moreover, the child sex ratio in Katra is around 863 compared to Uttar Pradesh state average of 902. The literacy rate of Katra city is 49.42% lower than state average of 67.68%. In Katra, male literacy is around 56.47% while the female literacy rate is 41.47%.

Religions in Katra (Census 2011)
Religion	Percent
Hindus	57.08%
Muslims	42.74%
Christians	0.11%
Sikhs	0.01%
Buddhist	0.01%
Others†	0.05%
Distribution of religions

== Climate ==
The city is located in northern plains and experiences humid sub-tropical climate influenced by Kumaon Himalayan weather and monsoon streams. The summers are very hot the monsoon brings most of the rainfall and winter is generally cold with fog and mist in the city. The spring sees a bloom in plants and orchards with dahlias, tulips, chrysanthemum, bougainvillea, roses and sunflowers to bloom. The autumn is much like April.

Climate data for Miranpur Katra
Month	Jan	Feb	Mar	Apr	May	Jun	Jul	Aug	Sep	Oct	Nov	Dec	Year
Mean daily maximum °C (°F)	24 (75)	27 (81)	35 (95)	38 (100)	42 (108)	46 (115)	37 (99)	38 (100)	36 (97)	34 (93)	25 (77)	20 (68)	31.6 (88.9)
Mean daily minimum °C (°F)	1 (34)	5 (41)	12 (54)	16 (61)	25 (77)	27 (81)	25 (77)	25 (77)	24 (75)	19 (66)	13 (55)	4 (39)	1 (34)
Average precipitation mm (inches)	122.1 (4.81)	120.3 (4.74)	117.6 (4.63)	6.2 (0.24)	118.2 (4.65)	111.8 (4.40)	1,299.7 (51.17)	1,317 (51.85)	1,166 (45.91)	85.8 (3.38)	3.1 (0.12)	14.1 (0.56)	1,071.9 (42.20)
Source: IMD
