= Community company =

The community company is a business model which was developed in the 1970s. It was distinguished from more conventional business models of the time by its lack of a rigid corporate boundary (facilitating the easy involvement of people at their chosen level) and its internal gift economy which was distinct from its exchanges with the external monetary economy. As an alternative to a hierarchical, top-down control system, it practiced what was called emergent decision-making, which required that those involved with the implementation of a decision should be involved in making the decision. The model rests on research into human personality carried out at the Centre for Human Communication.

The model was first publicly presented by Kevin Kingsland in his 1977 paper to the 1st European Conference of the Association for Humanistic Psychology, University College London entitled You can tell a man by the company he creates. It was updated in the Kingsland K. and Kingsland V. paper presented in 1996 to 2nd ALPS Euroconference, University of Bologna entitled The Enacted Company.

It was suggested that the community company satisfied the need for a more inclusive and sustainable way of working than was to be found in traditional business models. Many elements of the community company model can be seen in recent developments such as the social enterprise model and social business ventures such as the Grameen Bank with its system of self-help groups.

== Operational attributes ==
A paper presented to the City University Business School (Masters Programme 1982) identified the following attributes of a community company:

Imployment. The community company does not have a hard boundary with people either employed or not employed. Rather, it has a fuzzy boundary with people becoming more or less involved through their own volitions. Involvement in day-to-day work changes over time as people move through different phases or episodes of life. This allows people to adjust their involvement through times of parenting, illness or concerns beyond the company for example.

Role evolution. Roles evolve continuously as individuals develop their capabilities and needs change in the company. Individual development is enhanced by and necessary for the development of the community company. The community company values individual development and supports it, allowing people to develop healthily even if it leads to the individual wishing to move away from the company. In this case, the individual is supported.

Authority is achieved by natural recognition of an individual's competence. Authority is distributed and authentic.

Decision making is achieved by emergent decision making processes. This is a clearly defined methodology that ensures that a decision which is made by the company can be carried out. Decisions are defined as precursors to action. There is no such thing as a decision that is not actioned.

Direction of the community company is achieved through a living evolving meta vision. This is a vision that allows each individual to work towards their own vision as part of the whole. The meta vision encompasses each person's vision. Should visions greatly diverge a new community company may be spun out.

== Examples ==
The first full example of a community company was Grael Associates Limited in 1973 which ran restaurants, sold wholefoods and published books. For example Hathapradipka and the Glastonbury Zodiac were both printed and published by Grael Communications. Grael inspired and was followed by other companies such as the Whole Food Company Limited and Infoshare Limited in the 1980s.

== Academic interest ==
The application of the model in real life organisations stimulated significant interest from academics (Tan, 1978, Velge 1983) and the model was used in the small business start-up programme taught by Urbed in the 1980s.
