= Bareilly division =

Administrative division of Uttar Pradesh, India

Coordinates: 28°21′41″N 79°25′44″E

Bareilly division

Bareilly division is one of the 18 administrative geographical units (i.e. divisions) of the northern Indian state of Uttar Pradesh. Bareilly city is the administrative headquarters of the division. Part of the Rohilkhand region, Bareilly division consists of four major districts in western Uttar Pradesh - Bareilly, Badaun, Pilibhit and Shahjahanpur.

Bareilly is the medical hub of Uttar Pradesh, one of the biggest industrial areas and the third fastest developing city of Uttar Pradesh.

Budaun is a politically sensational and historical city and has many historical sites, one of the oldest existing city of India, and was the capital of India during Iltutmish's rule. It is also the sixth fastest developing city in Uttar Pradesh.

Shahjahanpur is also one of the main cities of western Uttar Pradesh.

Currently (As of 2005), the division consists of 4 districts:-

- Bareilly
- Badaun
- Pilibhit
- Shahjahanpur

== Tourist attractions ==
- Pilibhit Tiger Reserve

== Major cities ==
- Bareilly
- Budaun
- Shahjahanpur
- Pilibhit
- Baheri
- Aonla
- Ujhani
- Puranpur
- Faridpur
- Sahaswan
- Nawabganj
- Bisalpur, Pilibhit
