= Shahjahanpur district =

Coordinates: 28°00′N 79°50′E

- District of Uttar Pradesh
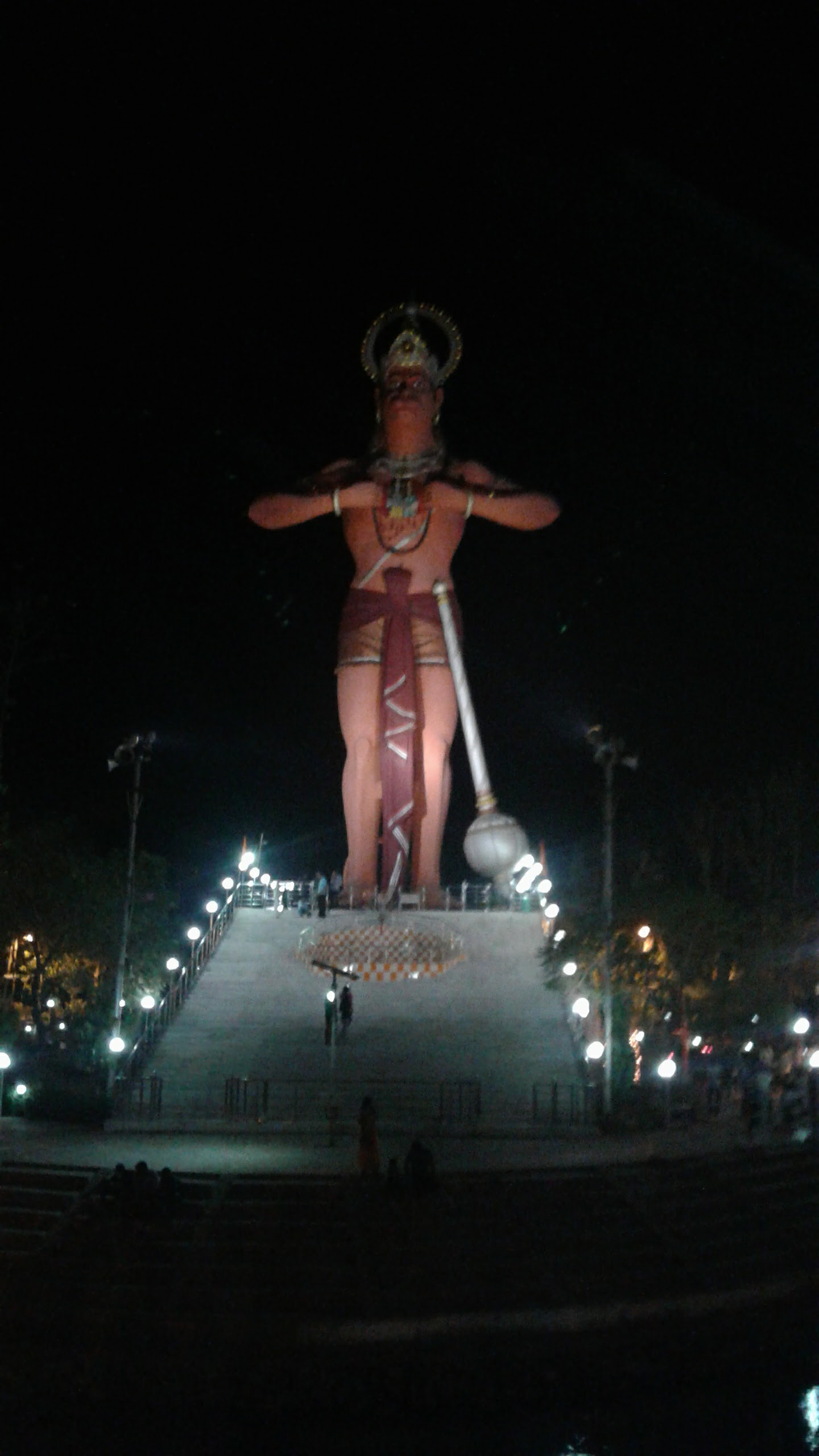
- Hanumat Dham

- Location of Shahjahanpur district in Uttar Pradesh
- Country: India
- State: Uttar Pradesh
- Division: Bareilly
- Headquarters: Shahjahanpur
- Tehsils: Sadar, Powayan, Tilhar and Jalalabad

Government
  - Lok Sabha constituencies: Shahjahanpur (Lok Sabha constituency)
  - Vidhan Sabha constituencies: 1.Tilhar; 2. Jalalabad; 3. Katra; 4. Powayan; 5. Shahjahanpur; 6. Dadraul

Area
  - Total: 4,575 km^{2} (1,766 sq mi)

Population (2011)
  - Total: 3,006,538
  - Density: 657.2/km^{2} (1,702/sq mi)

Demographics
  - Literacy: 59.54%
- Time zone: UTC+05:30 (IST)
- Vehicle registration: UP 27
- Website: http://shahjahanpur.nic.in/

Shahjahanpur district is a district of Uttar Pradesh India. It is a part of Bareilly division. It was established in 1813 by the British Government. Previously it was a part of district Bareilly. Geographically the main town is Shahjahanpur, which is its headquarters. Its five tehsils are: Powayan, Kalan, Tilhar, Jalalabad and Sadar.

== History ==
Very little is known about the early history of this region. There are prominent ruins at Mati, Nigohi, and Gola Raipur. The area covered by Shahjahanpur district was likely part of the ancient kingdom of Ahichhatra, which is supported by numerous Ahichhatra coins found at Mati, which appears to have been an important city in ancient times. For a long time, tradition holds that this area was ruled by indigenous groups like the Gujars, the Ahirs, the Pasis, the Arakhs, the Bhihars, and the Bhils. Their rule appears to have been supplanted by the Rajputs and Muslims later than other places in the region.

During the middle ages, Shahjahanpur district was part of the greater region of Katehr. It is almost completely unmentioned in contemporary Muslim accounts of the Delhi Sultanate, and there were no Muslim settlements here until the establishment of the isolated fortified towns of Jalalabad, Kant, and Gola. The reason for this is that Muslim rulers were unable to wield any effective control over this region without an enormous effort. If invaded, the Katehrias and other ruling Rajput in the region would simply burn their crops and retreat into the forests, making it impossible to collect revenue from them. As a result, the Muslim rulers generally left them to themselves, and would only take military action in response to aggression by the Rajput tribes.

One such campaign took place in 1421, which is around when Gola was likely established as a Muslim outpost. Given its remote position, though, it could not have been much more than an outpost, and today it is only marked by a mound. Muslim coins have been found here, as they have at Mati, and the writers Zia-ud-Din Barni and Firishta mention Gola as part of the governorship of Hisam-ul-Mulk, who was governor of both Sambhal and Awadh in 1377. Kant, on the other hand, was permanently inhabited as Muslim power became consolidated in the region, and Jalalabad was probably established as a garrison even earlier, since it lay on the main route used by Muslim armies in the region.

=== 16th century ===
It was under Sher Shah Suri that the area of modern Shahjahanpur district was incorporated more firmly into Muslim territory, as the sarkar of Kant-o-Gola. After the governor of Sambhal, Nasir Khan, was unsuccessful in his attempts to subjugate the Katehrias, Sher Shah made him the subordinate of Isa Khan Kalkapuri, and he granted Isa Khan a jagir consisting of the parganas of Kant and Gola, along with Tilhar. The two men together had great success in not only defeating the local zamindars, but also extending the cultivation in the region.

During the early part of Akbar's reign, Kant-o-Gola remained a separate sarkar, but after the death of its governor Hussain Khan Tukriya in 1576 it appears that Kant-o-Gola was merged into the sarkar of Budaun. This arrangement is reflected in the Ain-i-Akbari, which lists Kant and Gola as mahals of Budaun sarkar. Besides those two, the area of modern Shahjahanpur district was then also included in the mahals of Bareilly, also in Budaun sarkar, and Shamsabad, which was in Kannauj sarkar.

=== 17th century: foundation of Shahjahanpur city ===
Nothing more is recorded about the Shahjahanpur area until the reign of Shah Jahan, which is when the city of Shahjahanpur was founded. Shahjahanpur was established by Diler Khan and Bahadur Khan, sons of Dariya Khan, who had been a soldier in the army of Mugal Emperor Jahangir but later been part of the rebellion of Khan Jahan. Both Diler Khan and Bahadur Khan had risen to high positions in the Mughal army under Shah Jahan. After a force of Bachhils and Gaurs plundered an imperial treasure convoy at Kant in 1647, Diler Khan obtained permission to lead a punitive expedition against them. He defeated them in battle at Chinaur, near the site of Shahjahanpur. Pleased with the services of Diler Khan, Shahjahan gave him 14 villages and directed him to construct a fort.

Diler Khan chose the site of Noner Khera, near the confluence of the Garrah and Khannaut rivers, which supposedly had once been a Gujar stronghold. He established the mohallas of Dilerganj and Bahadurganj, while his brother Bahadur Khan brought many Pathans with him to populate the new city. The history of Shahjahanpur and the family of Darya Khan are recorded in the Shahjahanpurnama, which was written by an anonymous author in 1839, as well as in the Akhbar-i-Muhabbat of Nawab Muhabbat Khan. Diler Khan later went on to found the city of Shahabad, in modern Hardoi district, where his descendants still live, while Bahadur Khan and his descendants stayed in Shahjahanpur, where they held the title of Nawab until the time of the British Raj.

=== Kingdom of Rohilkhand ===
The ruling Pathans of Shahjahanpur were at least nominally subjects of the governors of Bareilly, but during the 1700s they became closely aligned with the Bangash Nawabs of Farrukhabad. This changed after the death of Ali Muhammad Khan, the ruler of Rohilkhand, in 1749:. Qaim Khan, then Nawab of Farrukhabad, then invaded Rohilkhand but was defeated and killed in battle, and the Rohillas were able to drive out the Bangash from the region. Later, when Rohilkhand was partitioned in 1754, Shahjahanpur was included in the part that went to Hafiz Rahmat Khan.

Rohilla rule over the Shahjahanpur area was never very strong — the Pathan families of Shahjahanpur and Tilhar, the Gaur rajas of Pawayan, and the various Hindu zamindars were practically independent rulers. However, the Rohillas left a mark on the administrative setup here, abolishing some parganas and creating many others. The old pargana of Gola was completely dismembered, and its 10 component tappas were assigned to several new parganas. Part of the Haveli tappa, as well as Islamabad, Jiwan (aka Murtazabad), and Aurangabad, made up the new pargana of Pawayan, which was based on the Raja of Pawayan's territory. Another part of Haveli was joined with the tappa of Pilkhana to form the new pargana of Baragaon. The rest of Haveli went with Nigohi and Godarna to form the new pargana of Nigohi. The tappa of Mati, and part of Majhra, became the pargana of Khutar, and finally Chakidpuri and the rest of Majhra went into the new pargana of Puranpur.

The massive pargana of Bareilly was also completely split up by the Rohillas. In the area of Shahjahanpur district, the tappa of Charkhaula was made into the pargana of Jalalpur, while another part of the pargana became Khera Bajhera, which also included a small corner detached from Kant pargana. The only other change to Kant pargana was that Tilhar was split off to become its own pargana. Finally, the new pargana of Mihrabad was created from Shamsabad pargana. Another pargana which would later become part of Shahjahanpur district, Katra, had already been created during the reign of Aurangzeb.

=== Nawabs of Awadh and British rule ===
As a result of the First Rohilla War, Rohilkhand was ceded to the Nawabs of Awadh on 7 October 1774. Under Awadh rule, the future Shahjahanpur district was entirely included in Bareilly district. This continued after Awadh ceded all of Rohilkhand to the British in 1801.

In 1813-14, a separate Shahjahanpur district was created, and originally it covered the entire territory between the Ganges and Ramganga down to the reduced border with Awadh. At that time, it included the parganas of Shahjahanpur, Mihrabad, Tilhar, Nigohi, Jalalpur, Khera Bajhera, Miranpur Katra, Baragaon, Pawayan, Khutar, Marauri, Bangaon, Amritpur, Khakhatmau, Paramnagar, Khairigarh, and Puranpur Sabna. Many changes to its boundaries then occurred: in 1816, Khairigarh was given to the Nawab of Awadh, in return for part of Jaunpur district and the small pargana of Palia, which became part of Shahjahanpur district. Then in 1829, Amritpur, Bangaon, Khakhatmau, and Paramnagar were transferred into Farrukhabad district, although Bangaon would later be moved back into Shahjahanpur district in 1842 and joined with Mihrabad to form Jalalabad tehsil. In 1841-42, Marauri was moved into Bareilly district, and finally, in 1865, Palia was moved into Kheri district and Puranpur Sabna was also transferred to Bareilly district.

=== District headquarters ===
The district headquarters is still known as Shahjahanpur, which is called Shahjahanpur shahr. It has a separate municipality.

== Geography ==
Located in the south-east of Bareilly Division, Shahjahanpur is an agriculture-based district of Uttar Pradesh. As per government notification it was established in the year 1813. Before its creation it was a part of Bareilly district. Geographically, it is situated at 27.35 N latitude and 79.37 E longitude. Adjoining districts of Shahjahanpur are Lakhimpur Kheri, Hardoi, Farrukhabad, Bareilly, Badaun, and Pilibhit. Its geographical area is 4575 metres ^{2}.

The Ramganga, the Garrah and the Gomti are the main rivers of the district. The Kathana, the Jhukma the Mensi Rivers flow into the Gomti. The Khannaut, the Suketa and the Kai Rivers feed the Garrah.

== Demographics ==
Historical population
Year	Pop.	±% p.a.
1901	911,065	—
1911	934,083	+0.25%
1921	829,821	−1.18%
1931	877,505	+0.56%
1941	953,673	+0.84%
1951	974,037	+0.21%
1961	1,093,987	+1.17%
1971	1,247,199	+1.32%
1981	1,596,417	+2.50%
1991	1,925,650	+1.89%
2001	2,464,930	+2.50%
2011	3,006,538	+2.01%

Religions in Shahjahanpur district (2011)
Religion	Percent
Hinduism	80.24%
Islam	17.55%
Sikhism	1.70%
Other or not stated	0.51%
Distribution of religions

According to the 2011 census Shahjahanpur district has a population of 3,006,538, roughly equal to the nation of Albania or the US state of Mississippi. This gives it a ranking of 123rd in India (out of a total of 640). The district has a population density of 673 inhabitants per square kilometre (1,740/sq mi). Its population growth rate over the decade 2001-2011 was 17.84%. Shahjahanpur has a sex ratio of 865 females for every 1000 males and a literacy rate of 61.61%. 19.76% of the population lives in urban areas. Scheduled Castes make up 17.72% of the population.

Languages of Shahjahanpur district (2011)
1. Hindi (91.2%)
2. Urdu (7.25%)
3. Punjabi (1.40%)
4. Others (0.16%)

At the time of the 2011 Census of India, 91.19% of the population in the district spoke Hindi, 7.25% Urdu and 1.40% Punjabi as their first language.

== Notable people ==
- Madan Shahjahanpuri, 18th-century theologian
- Ahmadullah Shah (Freedom Fighter)
- Ram Prasad Bismil (Freedom Fighter)
- Ashfaqulla Khan (Freedom Fighter)
- Thakur Roshan Singh (Freedom Fighter)
- Prem Krishna Khanna (Freedom Fighter)
- Rajpal Yadav (Bollywood Actor)
- Salona Kushwaha (MLA Tilhar) (First Women MLA in Shahjahanpur on unreserved seat)
- Alok Pandey (Bollywood Actor)
- Naik Jadunath Singh (Param Veer Chakra Winner)
- Alam Khan (TV Actor)
- Jitin Prasada (Indian Politician, son of Jitendra Prasad)
- Suresh Kumar Khanna (Indian Politician)
