= Tilhar =

City in Uttar Pradesh, India

- City
- Location in Uttar Pradesh, India
- Coordinates: 27°57′46″N 79°44′17″E
- Country: India
- State: Uttar Pradesh
- District: Shahjahanpur
- Founder: Tilakraj

Government
  - Type: Municipal corporation
  - Body: Nagar Palika

Area
  - Total: 20.89 km^{2} (8.07 sq mi)
  - Rank: 1
- Elevation: 152 m (499 ft)

Population (2001)
  - Total: 52,909
  - Density: 2,533/km^{2} (6,560/sq mi)

Languages
  - Official: Hindi
- Time zone: UTC+5:30 (IST)
- 242307: 242307
- Vehicle registration: UP27
- Website: Website

Tilhar is a city and a very old tehsil of Uttar Pradesh, as well as the municipal board of the Shahjahanpur district in the Indian state of Uttar Pradesh. It is also a constituency of Uttar Pradesh Vidhan Sabha. The city was also known for supplying bows to Mughul armies, and Tilhar was referred to as Kamaan Nagar during the reign of emperor Jahangeer.

== Villages ==
- Banthra

== Demographics ==
According to the 2001 Census of India, Tilhar had a population of 52,909: 27,667 males and 25,242 females. Tilhar had an average literacy rate of 50.77%, which was below the state average of 67.68%. Male literacy stood at 55.53%, while female literacy was at 45.63%. 14% of the population was aged 0–6 years.

Religions in Tilhar
Religion	Percent
Hindus	58%
Muslims	41%
Jains	0.5%
Others†	0.5%
Distribution of religions †Includes Sikhs (0.2%), Buddhists (<0.2%).
