= Lucknow Pact =

1916 Indian Hindu-Muslim agreement

The Lucknow Pact was an agreement reached between the Indian National Congress and the Muslim League (AIML) at a joint session of both the parties held in Lucknow in December 1916. Through the pact, the two parties agreed to allow representation to religious minorities in the provincial legislatures. The Muslim League leaders agreed to join the Congress movement demanding Indian autonomy. Scholars cite this as an example of a consociational practice in Indian politics. Bal Gangadhar Tilak represented the Congress while framing the deal, and Muhammad Ali Jinnah (who joined the Muslim League in 1913) participated in this event.

== Background ==
The British had announced under immense pressure from Indian masses, in order to satisfy the Indians, that they will be considering a series of proposals that would lead to at least half of the members of the Executive Council being elected and the Legislative Council having a majority of elected members needed. Both the Congress and the Muslim League supported these. Both had realized that for further concessions to be gained, greater cooperation was required.

The Congress agreed to separate electorates for Muslims in electing representatives to the Imperial and Provincial Legislative Councils. Although the Muslims were given this right in the Indian Councils Act 1909, the Indian National Congress opposed it. The Congress also agreed to the idea of one-third seats for the Muslims in the Councils despite the fact that the Muslim population represented less than a third. Apart from that, the Congress agreed that no act affecting a community should be passed unless three-quarters of that community's members on the council supported it. After the signing of this pact the rivalry between moderates and extremists was reduced to some extent. There was a significant change in their relation.

Several factors contributed significantly to the change in Muslim League's position which led to the forging of the Lucknow Pact. British actions perceived as detrimental to Muslim interests played a crucial role, notably the refusal of Britain to support Turkey, the seat of the Khalifa who held considerable religious and political sway over Muslims, in its conflicts in the Balkans (1912-13) and with Italy (1911), which caused considerable anger within the community. Additionally, the annulment of the Partition of Bengal in 1911, a move that had garnered support from certain Muslim factions, led to resentment, and further alienating some Muslims was the British Indian government's rejection of the proposal to establish a university at Aligarh with affiliating powers across India. Simultaneously, a significant shift was occurring within the Muslim League as younger members began to embrace a more assertive nationalist stance, moving beyond the more constrained political perspective of the Aligarh school, a change evident at the Muslim League's Calcutta session in 1912 where the organization declared its commitment to collaborating with other groups towards achieving a system of self-government for India, as long as it didn't conflict with safeguarding Muslim interests; this convergence on the objective of self-government with the Congress drew the two parties closer, though it did not signify complete alignment with Congress ideology. The government's suppressive measures during the First World War further fueled anti-imperialist sentiments, particularly among the younger Muslim generation, often referred to as the 'Young Party', with publications like Maulana Azad's Al Hilal and Mohammad Ali's Comrade facing suppression and prominent leaders such as the Ali brothers, Maulana Azad, and Hasrat Mohani being interned; these actions intensified discontent and contributed to the climate that facilitated the Lucknow Pact.

== Demands presented to the British ==
Both parties presented some common demands to the British. They demanded:

- The number of elected seats on the councils should be increased.
- Laws/Motions which were passed by large majorities in the councils should be accepted as bindings by the British Government.
- Minorities in the provinces should be protected.
- All provinces should be granted autonomy.
- Separating the executive from the judiciary
- At least half of the members of the Executive Council being elected, the Legislative council having a majority of elected members

== Importance ==
The Lucknow Pact was seen as a beacon of hope to Hindu–Muslim unity. It was the first time that the Hindus and Muslims had made a joint demand for political reform to the British. It led to a growing belief in British India that Home Rule (self-government) was a real possibility. The pact also marked the high-water mark of Hindu-Muslim unity. It established cordial relations between the Muslim League and the Indian National Congress. Before the pact, both parties were viewed as rivals who opposed each other and worked in their own interests. However, the pact brought a change in that view.

The Congress also accepted Muslim demands such as weightage in elections and separate electorates. they earlier had rejected this concession given to Muslims in the Morley Minto reforms. This also highlighted that Congress accepted Muslim league status and that it was a separate party working for the interests of Muslims. It also meant that the Hindus and Congress accepted that Hindus and Muslims are separate communities with different demands and interests.

The Lucknow Pact also helped in establishing cordial relations between the two prominent groups within the Indian National Congress – the 'extremist' faction led by the Lal Bal Pal trio (Lala Lajpat Rai, Bal Gangadhar Tilak and Bipin Chandra Pal), and the 'moderate' faction led by Gopal Krishna Gokhale until his death in 1915 and later represented by Gandhi. Though Jinnah advocated a separate nation for the Muslims 20 years later, in 1916 he was a member of both Congress and Muslim League, was an associate of Tilak, and hailed as 'ambassador of Hindu-Muslim Unity’.

The Pact fostered a temporary but notable period of Hindu-Muslim unity, presenting a united front to the British government with joint demands for political reforms. The British government needed to placate the nationalists, which contributed to the declaration of their intention to introduce self-governing institutions, ultimately influencing the Montagu-Chelmsford reforms and the Government of India Act, 1919. The spirit of unity generated by the pact also played a role in the widespread participation seen in subsequent mass movements like the Non-Cooperation and Khilafat movements, which drew strength from combined Hindu and Muslim grievances. The Lucknow Pact, while aiming to safeguard minority rights and foster unity between the Congress and the Muslim League, unintentionally laid the groundwork for communal separation by endorsing separate electorates for Muslims. Although Muslims conceded some ground in regions where they were the majority, they gained substantially more representation in Hindu-majority areas—nearly double their population share. At the central level, they were allocated one-third of the legislative seats, reinforcing communal lines. These terms, which were later echoed in the Montagu-Chelmsford Reforms of 1919, were initially welcomed as a solution to communal discord. Yet over time, dissatisfaction emerged over the rigid and unequal seat distribution, and the formal recognition of Muslims as a distinct political group contributed to the eventual emergence of the two-nation theory and the demand for a separate Muslim state.

== See also ==
- Poona Pact
- Reservation in India
