= Early Nationalists =

Indian National Congress
- Leader: W.C. Bonnerjee; Rash Behari Ghosh Moderates Surendranath Banerjee; R. C. Dutt; Dadabhai Naoroji; Gopal Krishna Gokhale; Pherozeshah Mehta; Mahadev Govind Ranade; P. R. Naidu; S. Subramanian Iyer; Ananda Charlu; Madan Mohan Malaviya; A.O. Hume; William Wedderburn
- Founder: A.O. Hume
- Founded: 1885
- Dissolved: 1907
- Preceded by: Landholders' Society
- Succeeded by: Assertive Nationalists
- Newspaper: Dharma Marg Darshak (magazine)
- Ideology: Moderate nationalism Regain Self-government without violation

The Early Nationalists, also known as the Moderates, were a group of political leaders in India active between 1885 and 1907. Their emergence marked the beginning of the organised national movement in India. Some of the important moderate leaders were Pherozeshah Mehta and Dadabhai Naoroji. With members of the group drawn from educated middle-class professionals including lawyers, teachers and government officials, many of them were educated in England.

They are known as "Early Nationalists" because they believed in demanding reforms while adopting constitutional and peaceful means to achieve their aims. The Early Nationalists had full faith in the British sense of justice, fair play, honesty, and integrity while they believed that British rule was a boon for India. The Early Nationalists were staunch believers in open-minded and moderate politics.

Their successors, the "Assertives", existed from 1905 to 1919 and were followed by nationalists of the Gandhian era, which existed from 1919 until Indian Independence in 1947.

== Origins of the name "Moderates" ==
The first session of the Early Nationalists of India in 1885

Focusing on demands for reform, the Early Nationalists adopted a constitutional and peaceful approach to achieve their objectives. They remained friendly towards the British Empire but believed that Indians should have a proper and legitimate role in the government of the country. Although they asked for constitutional and other reforms within the framework of British rule, they had full faith in that nation's sense of justice and fair play. They further believed that continuation of the British connection with India was in the interests of both countries. At an early stage, the nationalists considered their association with England an advantage by considering British rule had done much good by removing various anomalies. Influenced by western thought, culture, education, literature and history, the demands of the early nationalists were not considered extreme but of a relatively moderate nature.

== Methodology ==
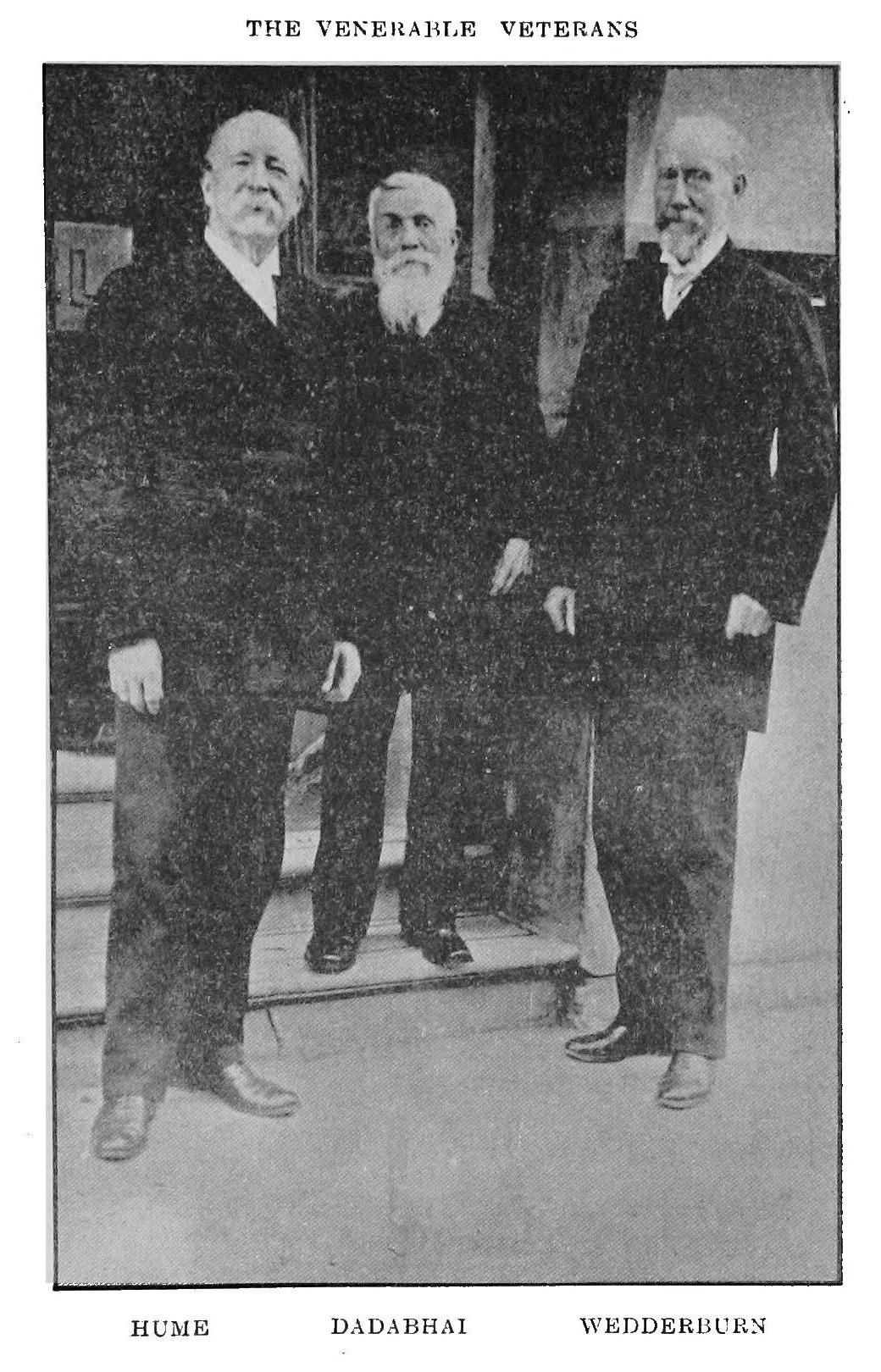
The founder of Early Nationalism A. O. Hume (left) with Sir William Wedderburn (right) and Dadabhai Naoroji

The Early Nationalists believed in patience and conciliation rather than confrontation, adopting orderly progress and constitutional means to realise their aims. To educate the people, to arouse political consciousness, and to create powerful public opinion in favour of their demands they organised annual sessions. Processions and meetings were held, speeches delivered and discussions held on various economic, social and political questions. Following these discussions, resolutions were adopted. They also drafted petitions and memorandums before submitting them to the government. The Early Nationalists wanted to convey their feelings to the government, so as to gradually bring the authorities around to their viewpoint. To influence the British government and to enlighten the British public and its political leaders, the Early Nationalists sent deputations of leading Indian leaders to England. In 1889, a British Committee of the Indian National Congress was founded and followed by a journal called India started by the Committee in 1890.

== Achievements ==
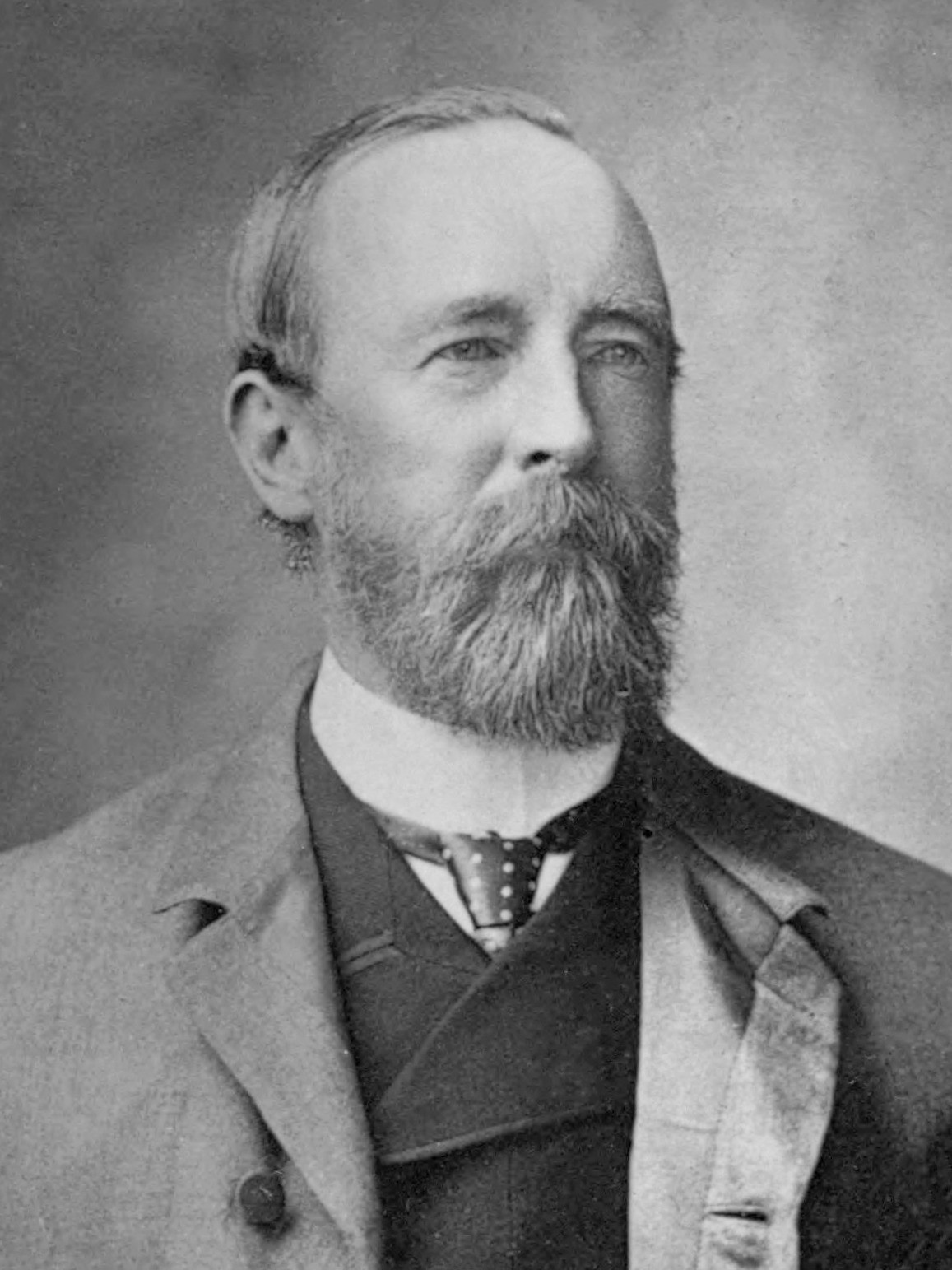
A. O. Hume, the founder of Indian National Congress (Moderates)

In spite of their role as the most progressive force of the time, the Early Nationalists received widespread criticism over their lack of success. They were treated with contempt by the colonial administration and their demands were not fulfilled.

In spite of such criticism, the Early Nationalists did achieve some of their goals. They created a national awakening among the people that made Indians conscious of the bonds of common political, economic, and cultural interests that united them. They also trained people in politics by popularising the ideas of democracy, civil liberties, secularism and nationalism . The Early Nationalists did pioneering work by exposing the true nature of British rule in India. They made the people realise the economic content and character of British colonialism. In doing so, they weakened the foundations of British rule in India. Their political and economic programmes established the idea that India must be ruled in the interest of the Indians. The efforts of the Early Nationalists also led to the implementation of various social reforms such as the appointment of a Public Service Commission. A resolution of the House of Commons (1893) allowing for simultaneous examination for the Indian Civil Service in London and India. Appointment of the Welby Commission on Indian Expenditure (1895). They also passed the Indian Councils Act 1892.

These achievements served as the basis for nationalist movements in later years by extremist leaders.

== Objectives ==
The Early Nationalists wanted certain political and economic reforms with the view to unify the people of India.

=== Constitutional reforms ===
Believing that India should eventually move towards democratic self-government, the Early Nationalists wanted a larger share in the governing of India. They did not seek immediate attainment of their goal as they feared that the government would suppress their activities. Instead they aimed at winning freedom through a gradual process.

Their constitutional demands were:

1. Abolition of the India Council Act.
2. Expansion of the legislative council and Legislative Assemblies, both Central and Provincial.
3. Increase in the membership of Indians by including some members elected by local bodies like chambers of commerce, universities, etc. in these councils and by giving greater powers to them. They demanded Indian control over the public purse and raised the slogan "No taxation without representation".
4. By the beginning of the 20th century, they demanded for Swaraj (self-rule) within the British Empire similar to the self-governing colonies in Canada and Australia.
5. Adequate representation of Indians in the executive council of the Viceroy and those of the governors.
6. Reformation and expansion of the legislative councils created by the act of 1861. They demanded an increase in the membership of these councils and all legislative and financial matters including the Budget should be submitted to these councils.
7. The members of the legislative councils to be directly elected by the people of India.
8. A complete separation of the executive and judicial branches of administration.
9. Complete self government modelled on self governing British colonies like Australia and Canada.

=== Administrative reforms ===
The Moderates made the following demands in the administrative sphere:

1. Demand for simultaneous Indian Civil Service examinations in England and India.
2. Complete separation of the executive and the judiciary. They made this demand to protect Indians from arbitrary acts by the police and the bureaucracy.
3. Increase in the powers of the municipal bodies and reduction of official control over them.
4. Repeal of the Arms Act and License Act.
5. Wider employment of Indians in the higher grades of administrative services.
6. Spread of primary education among the masses.
7. Improvement of the police system to make it honest, efficient and popular.

=== Defence of civil rights ===
The Early Nationalists defended civil rights whenever the British government tried to curtail them. Their struggle for freedom became an integral part of the national movement from the very beginning. In 1897, Tilak and many other leaders were arrested and tried for making provocative speeches. The Early Nationalists demanded the Abolition of the Preventive Detention Act and restoration of individual liberties and right to assemble and to form associations. They also wanted the Removal of the restrictions imposed by the British Government on the freedom of speech, and the freedom of the press.

== Criticism ==
The methods used by the Early Nationalists of passing resolutions and sending petitions were seen as inadequate by critics who argued that they depended on the generosity of the British instead of relying on their own strength and directly challenging colonial rule. Some historians have argued that the Early Nationalists misunderstood the British government and believed the fundamentally diametric interests of both the colonial administration and the nationalist movement could be resolved in favor of the latter. The Early Nationalists failed to draw the masses into the mainstream of the national movement such that their area of influence remained limited to urban educated Indians. In particular, their leadership comprised only members of professional groups such as lawyers, doctors, journalists and teachers.

== Response from the colonial administration ==
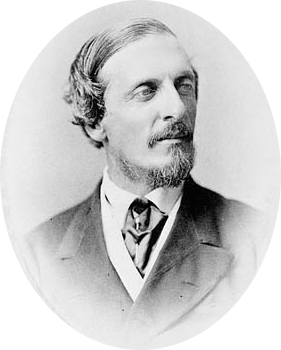
Lord Dufferin

In the beginning, the British colonial administration looked upon the actions of the Early Nationalists favourably, and expressed no animosity towards them. Furthermore, a few government officials attended the first session of the Early Nationalists and took part in its deliberations. The Nationalists were invited to a garden party held by the Viceroy of India, Lord Dufferin in Calcutta in 1886 and another hosted by the Governor of Chennai in 1887. Official attitudes soon changed; Lord Dufferin tried to divert the National Movement by suggesting to Allan Hume that the Early Nationalists should devote themselves to social rather than political affairs.

However, rather than emerging as a useful tool in the hands of the colonial administration, the Early Nationalists gradually became the focus of Indian nationalism. In 1887, Dufferin attacked the Early Nationalists in a speech and ridiculed it as representing only a microscopic minority of the Indian people. Colonial officials in India criticised the Nationalists and characterised its leaders as "disloyal babus" and "violent villains". The next year Lord Dufferin published the Report on the Conditions of the Lower Classes of Population in Bengal (known as the Dufferin Report), which highlighted the plight of the poor in Bengal, which was then used by the Early Nationalists to counter the claim that British rule had been beneficial to the poorest members of Indian society. Finally, in 1890 government employees were forbidden to participate in deliberations with the Early Nationalists or attend their meetings.

== Failure ==
Some of the younger elements within the Indian National Congress were dissatisfied with the achievements of the Early Nationalists and vociferous critics of the methods of peaceful constitutional agitation that they promulgated. Young members advocated the adoption of European revolutionary methods to counter British colonial rule while mainstream Early Nationalists remained loyal to the Crown, with their desire to regain self-government lacking conviction. The Early Nationalists failed to attain their objectives, giving rise to another group of leaders known as Assertive or Extremist Nationalists. The most prominent leaders of the Assertive Nationalists were Bal Gangadhar Tilak, Lala Lajpat Rai and Bipin Chandra Pal, who are known collectively as the Lal-Bal-Pal trio.

== Prominent leaders who fought for independence ==
=== Surendranath Banerjee ===
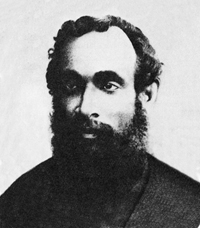
Surendranath Banerjee

To create an all-India political organisation, Banerjee convened the Indian National Conference in 1883 at Kolkata. Banerjee merged the Indian National Conference with the Indian National Congress in 1886 as both organisations had similar objectives. He presided over two sessions of the Congress in 1895 and 1902.

=== Gopal Krishna Gokhale ===
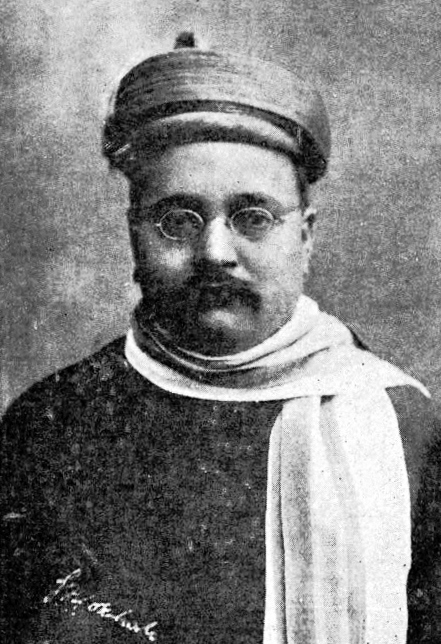
Gopal Krishna Gokhale

Gopal Krishna Gokhale, known as "The Political Guru of Gandhi" as he was the one who guided Mahatma Gandhi to travel around India in order to fight against the British, was one of the social and political leaders during the Indian Independence Movement against the British Empire in India. Gokhale was a senior leader of the Indian National Congress and founder of the Servants of India Society. Through the Society as well as the Congress and other legislative bodies he served in, Gokhale campaigned for Indian self-rule and also social reform. He was the leader of the moderate faction of the Congress party that advocated reforms by working with existing government institutions.

=== A. O. Hume ===
While the Early Nationalists moved towards the formation of an all-India political body, Englishman A. O. Hume, a retiree from the Indian Civil Service, saw the need for an organisation that would draw the government's attention to current administrative drawbacks and suggest the means to rectify them. In 1884 Hume, in consultation with the Indian leaders, laid the foundations of Indian National Union but it was postponed due to an outbreak of plague in Pune. Later on, at the suggestion of Dadabhai Naoroji, the name was changed to "Indian National Congress" and the foundation of the organisation laid on 28 December 1885.

=== Dadabhai Naoroji ===
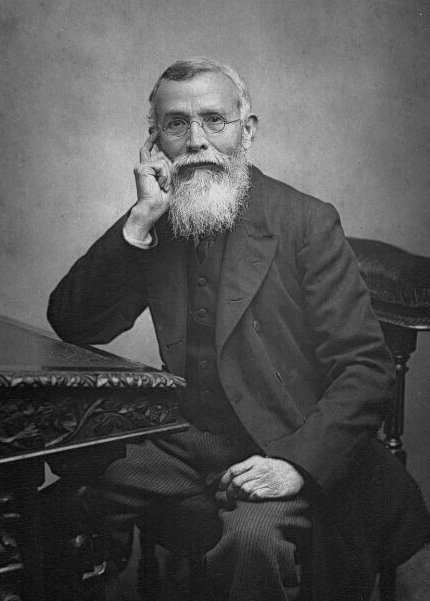
Dadabhai Naoroji in 1892.

Dadabhai Naoroji, popularly known as the "Grand Old Man of India", took an active part in the foundation of the Indian National Congress and was elected its president thrice, in 1886, 1893 and after the Moderate phase in 1906. He spent a major part of his life in Britain.He founded the London Indian Society which he used to create the awareness among the British people about the plight of the Indians. His book Poverty and UnBritish Rule in India explored how India was economically exploited by the British government.

== Sessions ==
| Year of session | Session | Place | Name of the president |
|---|---|---|---|
| 1885 | 1st | Mumbai | Womesh Chunder Bonnerjee |
| 1886 | 2nd | Kolkata | Dadabhai Naoroji |
| 1887 | 3rd | Chennai | Badruddin Tyabji |
| 1888 | 4th | Allahabad | George Yule |
| 1889 | 5th | Mumbai | William Wedderburn |
| 1890 | 6th | Kolkata | Pherozeshah Mehta |
| 1891 | 7th | Nagpur | Panapakkam Anandacharlu |
| 1892 | 8th | Allahabad | Womesh Chunder Bonnerjee |
| 1893 | 9th | Lahore | Dadabhai Naoroji |
| 1894 | 10th | Chennai | Alfred Webb |
| 1895 | 11th | Poona | Surendranath Banerjee |
| 1896 | 12th | Kolkata | Rahmatullah Sayani |
| 1897 | 13th | Amravati | M. C. Shankaran Nair |
| 1898 | 14th | Chennai | A. M. Bose |
| 1899 | 15th | Lucknow | Romesh Chunder Dutt |
| 1900 | 16th | Lahore | N. G. Chandavarkar |
| 1901 | 17th | Kolkata | Dinshaw Edulji Wacha |
| 1902 | 18th | Ahmedabad | Surendranath Banerjee |
| 1903 | 19th | Chennai | Lalmohan Ghosh |
| 1904 | 20th | Mumbai | Henry Cotton |
| 1905 | 21st | Banaras | Gopal Krishna Gokhale |
| 1906 | 22nd | Kolkata | Dadabhai Naoroji |

== See also ==
- Surat Split
- History of the Indian National Congress
