= Garam Dal =

Faction of the Indian National Congress

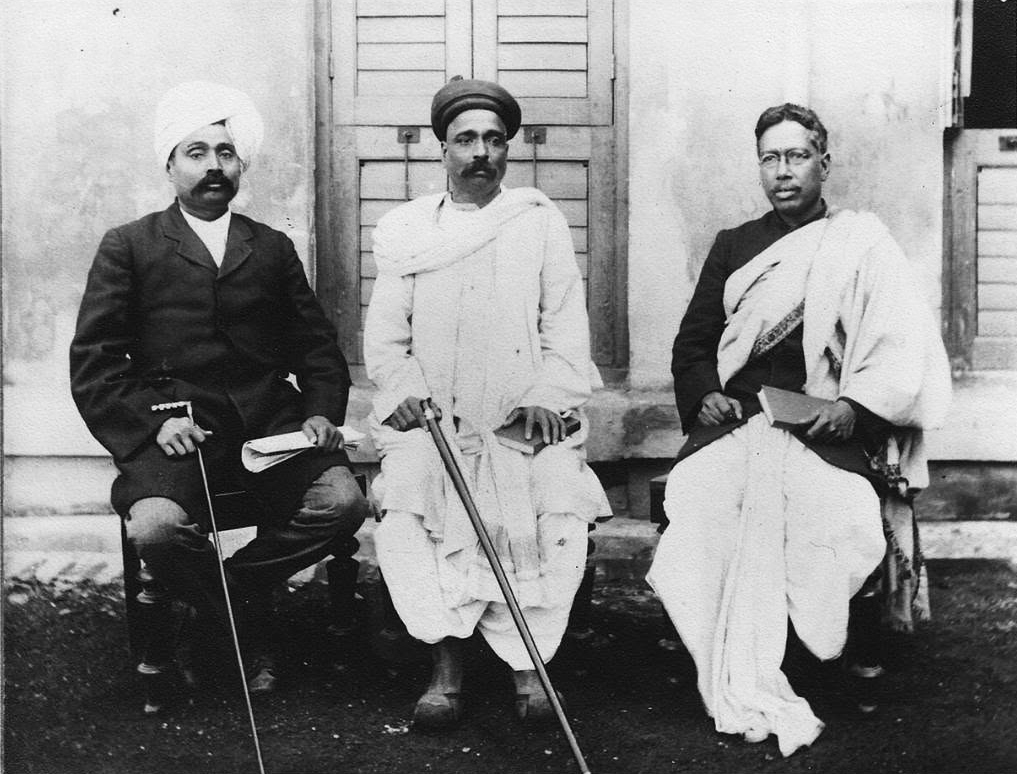
Lala Lajpat Rai (left), Bal Gangadhar Tilak and Bipin Chandra Pal (right), the triumvirate known as Lal- Bal-Pal were the leaders of the Garam Dal.

The Indian National Congress was formed in 1885. In 1907, it split into two factions, the Radicals — the Garam Dal (hot faction) — led by Bal Gangadhar Tilak and the Moderates — the Naram Dal (soft faction) — led by Gopal Krishna Gokhale. They were termed so because of their attitude towards the British rule. The Garam Dal is considered a triumvirate consisting of Lala Lajpat Rai and Bipin Chandra Pal, apart from Tilak. According to Bhatt and Bhargava, the differences between the two factions of the Congress paralyzed it, due to which "the agitation for independence ran out of steam and it remained so till the end of the First World War". The Naram Dal helped the British in the war effort, whereas the Garam Dal led by Tilak and Annie Besant started the Home Rule agitation in 1917. Asghar Ali Engineer writes that the Garam Dal separated itself from the Congress, after the differences that came to fore during the Congress session of Surat in 1907. Until 1915, Motilal Nehru was a member of the Naram Dal. However. under persuasion of his son Jawaharlal Nehru, he joined the Garam Dal.

== See also ==
- Bal Gangadhar Tilak
- Indian National Congress
