= Assertive Nationalism in India =

Assertive (Extremists/Aggressive) Nationalism was the period (1905–1914) in success to Early Nationalists or Moderates. The Early Nationalists failed to attain their objectives, giving rise to Extremist/Assertive Nationalism. The Last and final years of the nineteenth century saw the radical sensibility emerge among some Indian intellectuals like Lala Lajpat Rai, Bal Gangadhar Tilak and Bipin Chandra Pal (Lal Bal Pal ). They all were together known as Assertive Nationalists. They rejected the former notions of the moderates of prayers, petitions and protest or the 3P's. Instead, they began adopting aggressive measures like Swadeshi and Boycott and openly accused British for the 'economic crisis of India' and for gaining freedom from the British rule in India. They played a key role in the independence of India (modern day India, Myanmar, Pakistan and Bangladesh)

Use of the name "Moderates" Came to an end in 1907.

Causes for the Rise of Assertive Nationalism

Recognition of the True Nature of the British Rule

- The work of the early nationalists had exposed the economic exploitation of India by the British. Political developments such as the passing of the Vernacular Press Act and reduction in the number of Indian members in the Calcutta Corporation convinced the Indians that the British would never work in the interest of Indians and its people and the latter will have to fight for their rights. Failure of the Early Nationalists
- The young members of the Indian National Congress were not happy with the progress made by the early nationalists. They criticized the methods of peaceful agitations.
- The assertive nationalists believed that the early nationalists were loyal to the crown, and hence, their main objective was to improve their chances of getting seats in the Central Provincial Legislatures and judicial services.
- The failure of the early nationalists in receiving concrete reforms for the country led to the increasing demands for taking a radical approach for Indian nationalism.

Deteriorating Economic Condition

- There were recurrent famines in the country from 1896 to 1900. Millions of people died in these

famines. Nothing was done on the part of the government to provide relief to the people during famines.

- While on one hand, people were dying of hunger, Lord Lytton held a grand durbar at Delhi for

proclaiming Queen Victoria as ‘the Empress of India’. This agitated the people and provided conditions favorable for the growth of assertive nationalists. Influenced by International Events.

- The assertive nationalists were inspired by many international events which were taking place in the

world. In 1904–05, Japan defeated Russia in the Russo–Japanese War. It was for the first time that a European nation was defeated by an Asian nation.

- The Boers fought for three years in South Africa against the British Empire. These events made the

people realize that the European nations were not invincible and the British could be thrown out of the country through united efforts.

Nationalist School of Thought

- Since the beginning of the nationalist movement, many nationalists believed that no sacrifice is

adequate for the independence of the country. These nationalists were Rajnarain Bose, Ashwini Kumar Dutta and Vishnu Shastri Chiplunkar.

- The other assertive nationalists were Bal Gangadhar Tilak, Aurobindo Ghosh, Bipin Chandra Pal and

Lala Lajpat Rai. They wanted nothing less than complete independence and were ready to follow any means to achieve the same.

Repressive Colonial Policies of Lord Curzon

- Lord Curzon was known for his repressive policies. He passed the Act of 1898 which made it an

offence to provoke people against the English, the Calcutta Corporation Act which reduced the strength of Indian elected members and the Indian Universities Act of 1904 which imposed strict official control over Indian universities.

- All these measures created resentment in the Indians and they began to believe that equality would be

granted to them only if the British would leave India.

Partition of Bengal

- The Partition of Bengal provided a congenial environment for the growth of assertive nationalism. Lord

Curzon partitioned Bengal into East Bengal and West Bengal.

- Although the government said that the province of Bengal was partitioned for administrative

convenience, it was clearly visible that it wanted to create a rift between the Hindus and the Muslims as East Bengal was a Muslim majority region and West Bengal was a Hindu majority region.

- The protests of the people were suppressed brutally by the government which gave rise to assertive

nationalism in India.

The main aim of the assertive nationalists was the attainment of Swarajya or complete independence and not just dominion status in India.
