= Being Hindu, Being Indian =

2024 history book by Vanya Vaidehi Bhargav

- Author: Vanya Vaidehi Bhargav
- Language: English
- Subject: Lala Lajpat Rai, Hindu nationalism
- Genre: Intellectual history
- Publisher: Viking (Penguin Random House India)
- Publication date: 29 February 2024
- Publication place: India
- Media type: Print
- Pages: 800
- ISBN: 978-0-670-09407-3

Being Hindu, Being Indian: Lala Lajpat Rai's Ideas of Nationhood is a 2024 book by the historian Vanya Vaidehi Bhargav. It is an intellectual history of the nationalist thought of Lala Lajpat Rai, the Indian independence activist, examined across four phases of his political life between 1888 and 1928. The book was published by Viking, an imprint of Penguin Random House India, on 29 February 2024. It received a special mention at the 2025 Karwaan Book Awards.

== Summary ==
Bhargav argues against the view, widely held among historians, that Lajpat Rai's Hindu nationalist thought was an early precursor to Hindutva, the ideology associated with V. D. Savarkar. She follows Rai's political thinking through several phases. His early years in Punjab were shaped by Hindu, Sikh and Islamic cultural influences. In 1916 he supported the Congress–Muslim League pact and the Khilafat movement, and after 1915 his politics turned toward an inclusive "Indian" nationalism that described Hindus and Muslims as descendants of a shared Aryan-Mongolian lineage. By the 1920s, as leader of the Hindu Mahasabha, he combined a militant Hindu politics with an avowed commitment to a secular state built on equal citizenship. Bhargav shows these two commitments coexisting in Rai's politics rather than one cancelling out the other, and warns against reading that coexistence as proof that Hindu communal politics and secularism are easily reconciled.

== Background ==
Vanya Vaidehi Bhargav is an intellectual historian of modern South Asia who completed her doctorate in history at St Antony's College, Oxford. At the time of the book's publication, she was a senior research fellow with the Kolleg-Forschungsgruppe "Multiple Secularities – Beyond the West, Beyond Modernities" at the Humanities Centre for Advanced Studies, University of Leipzig. Her research has appeared in journals including the Journal of Asian Studies and Global Intellectual History.

== Reception ==
Reviewing the book for The Tribune, the critic called it a laudable effort that moves Lajpat Rai's public image beyond a simple nationalist-communalist binary, tracing how his early socialisation among Hindu, Sikh and Islamic influences in Punjab shaped a nationalism aimed at holding together a Hindu community that was a national majority but a regional minority in Punjab. At a book discussion hosted by the Centre for Studies of Plural Societies, historian Laurence Gautier chaired a session in which the writing style was noted for mirroring Rai's own political idiom. The book received a special mention from the jury of the 2025 Karwaan Book Award, alongside the year's non-fiction winner, Casting the Buddha.
