= Jaswant Singh Kanwal =

Indian novelist (1919–2020)

"Dr." Jaswant Singh Kanwal
- ਜਸਵੰਤ ਸਿੰਘ ਕੰਵਲ; جسونت سنگھ کنول; जसवंत सिंह कँवल
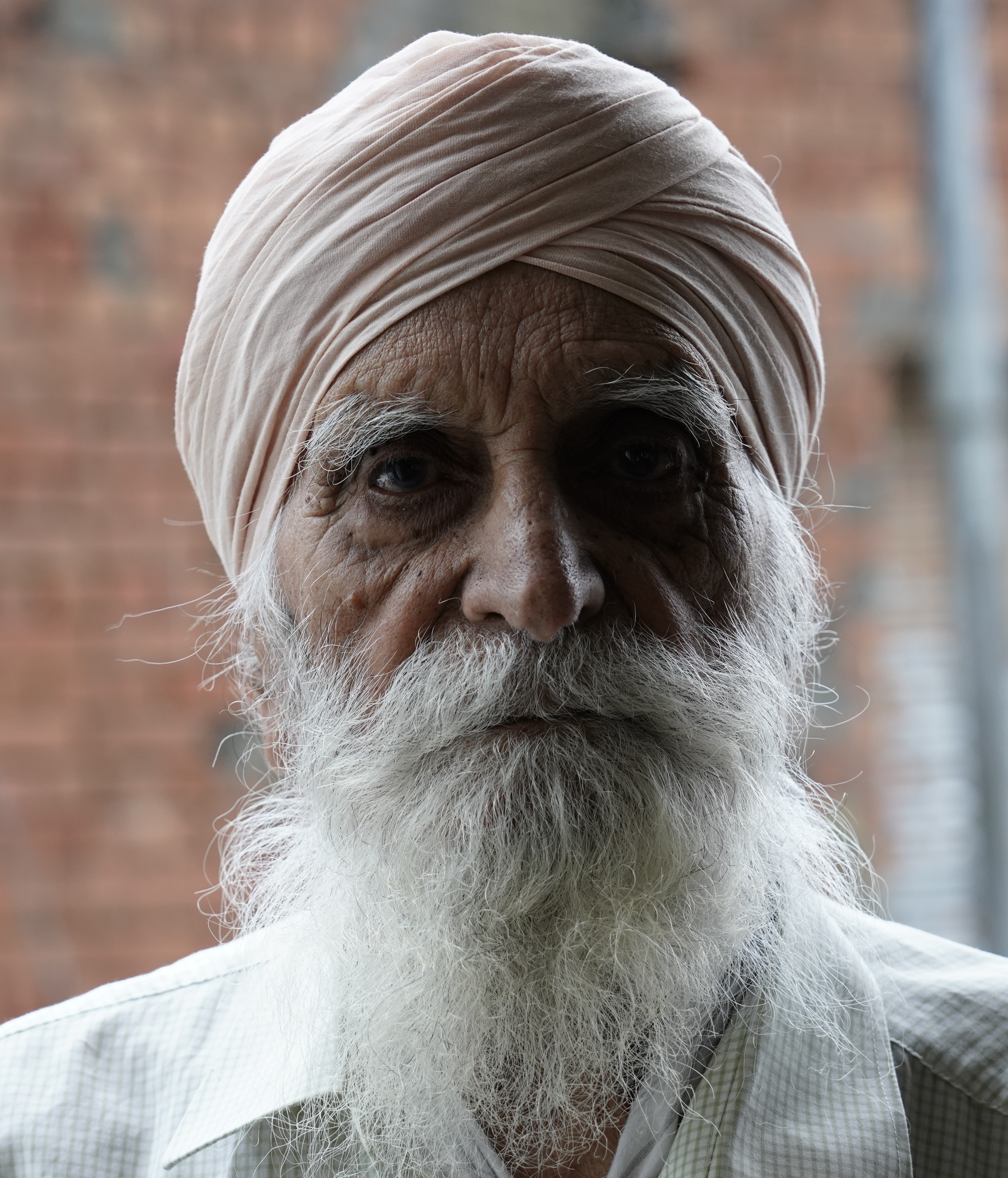
- JKanwal at his residence in Dhudike, 2018
- Born: 27 June 1919; Dhudike, Punjab, British India (now India)
- Died: 1 February 2020 (aged 100); Dhudike, Punjab, India
- Occupations: Novelist; poet; essayist
- Spouses: Mukhtiar Kaur; Jaswant Kaur Gill
- Children: 5; Amarjit Kaur; Charanjeet Kaur; Kanwaljit Kaur; Roopinderjit Kaur; Sarbjit Singh Gill
- Relatives: S. Mahla Singh (Father)
- Writing career
- Language: Punjabi (Gurmukhi)
- Years active: 1935-2019
- Period: 1944–2017
- Genres: Short story; romance; classic; memoir; realistic fiction; textbook; historical fiction; poetry; prose; autobiography
- Subjects: social customs and beliefs, social and gender equality, Khalistan, Left
- Notable works: Sach nu Phansi (1944-novel); Raat baki Hai (1954-novel); Haani (1961-novel); Bhavani (1961-poem); Lahu Di Lo (1985-novel); Ainion Chon Utho Surma (1985-novel); Taushali di hanso (1993-novel); Ik Hor Halen (2001-novel); Punia Da Chanan (2007-Auto biography); Dhur Dargaah (2017-Proverbs)
- Notable awards: Sahitya Akademi Award (1995); Shiromani Punjabi Sahitkar (1990); Punjabi Sahit Shiromani Award (2007); Degree of Doctor of Literature by Guru Nanak Dev University, Amritsar (2008); Tagore Literature Award (2009); Lifetime Achievement Award by Punjab Kala Parishad (2018); Kartar Singh Dhaliwal Award (1986)
- Literary movement: Pro Left, Khalistan, Pro Punjab
- Website: www.jaswantsinghkanwal.com

Jaswant Singh Kanwal (27 June 1919 – 1 February 2020) was an Indian novelist, short story writer and essayist of the Punjabi language. He was born in the village of Dhudike, Moga district, Punjab, India. As a young teenager he left school and went to Malaya. It was there that he first got interested in literature. He returned to Dhudike after a few years and has lived there ever since. He was awarded the Punjabi Sahit Shiromani Award in the year 2007.

== Writings ==
He published several books. His novels usually have a rustic feel and depict the rural life of Punjab very vividly. His writings generally question firmly held social customs and beliefs. He has left leanings and many of his most popular novels champion the cause of socially relevant issues like social and gender equality. He is also known to take tough political stands in his newspaper essays. Later on, he became a supporter of the Khalistan movement.

His most notable novel is Lahoo Di Lo (Dawn of the Blood). This novel is based on the Naxalite movement in Punjab. It was very controversial during the infamous Emergency days of the 1970s and none of the publishers was willing to publish it. Jaswant Singh Kanwal had it published in Singapore and smuggled copies of the novel to India. Only after the emergency was lifted, was the novel published in Punjab. This book has been translated into English.

== Awards ==
Jaswant Singh Kanwal was awarded Sahitya Akademi Fellowship for his 1996 book Pakhi (Hand Fan) (Short stories). He received the Sahitya Academy award for Taushali Di Hanso (Novel) in 1998.

Jaswant Singh Kanwal was conferred upon the degree of Doctor of Literature (Honoris Causa) by Guru Nanak Dev University, Amritsar in 2008 for his contribution to Punjabi literature.

== Bibliography ==
- Punjabio Marna Hai Ke Jina (O Punjabi! Do you wish to die or live?)
- Khoon Ke Sohile Gavee-aih Nanak (Nanak! Sing Sonnets of Blood)(Two volumes) Novel
- Mukati Maarag (Freedom Way) Novel
- Lahu Di Lo (Dawn of the Blood)
- Haani (Soul-mate)
- Roop Dhaara (Layers of Beauty)
- Manukhata (Humanity)
- Morha (The Turn)
- Civil Lines
- Jera (Guts)
- Jungle De Sher (Tigers of the Jungle)
- Raat Baaki Hai (The Night is Unfinished)
- Puranmaashi (Full Moon Night)
- Mittar Piyaare Nu (To Friend Beloved)
- Gora Mukh Sajna Da (Handsome is the face of friend)
- Pali
- Sach Nu Phansi (Death to the Truth)
- Rooh Da Haan (Friendship with the Soul)
- Dev Dass
- Chikar De Kanwal (Lotuses of Mud)
- Zindagi Door Nahin (Life is not Afar)
- Kande (Thorns)
- Sandhoor (Colour of Marriage)
- Hal Muridan Da (Tale of a Disciple) (Political Diary)
- Apna Quami Ghar (Our National Home Land)
- Ainion Chon Utho Surma (From the Masses Will Rise the Valorous)
- Jittnama (Tale of Victory)
- Juhu Da Moti
- Navan Sanias
- Sundraan
- Soormain
- Barf Di Agg
- Aradhna (worship)
- Hawka Te Muskaan
- Bhavana
- Jeevan Kahanian (Stories of Life)
- Sikh Jaddo Jehad (Sikh Struggle)
- Ainian Chon Utho Soorma
- Maran mitran de age
- Lamme Walan Di Peer
- Jand Panjab da
- Gwachi Pug (Lost honour)
- Tarikh vekhdi hai (Time is a Witness)
- Taushali di hanso
- Ahesas
- Roopmati
