= Lala Lajpat Rai Memorial Medical College =

Medical college in India

- Type: Public
- Established: 1966
- Academic affiliations: Atal Bihari Vajpayee Medical University (2021 - present); Chaudhary Charan Singh University (erstwhile Meerut University) (1966–2021)
- Principal: Dr. R. C. Gupta
- Location: Meerut, Uttar Pradesh, India; 28.9601961°N 77.7506663°E
- Campus: Urban
- Website: https://www.llrmmedicalcollege.edu.in/

Lala Lajpat Rai Memorial Medical College or LLRMC is a state-run Medical College located in Meerut, Uttar Pradesh, India. It is named after the Arya Samaj leader, Lala Lajpat Rai.

The college is affiliated with Chaudhary Charan Singh University, Meerut and was established in 1966.

The college is situated on the Garh Road, Meerut.

== Courses ==
The college offers both undergraduate and postgraduate courses in medicine. Various courses like M.B.B.S and Bsc. Nursing run in the college.

== Upgrade ==
The Government of India has decided to upgrade the institute along the lines of All India Institute of Medical Sciences as part of phase 3 of Pradhan Mantri Swasthya Suraksha Yojana (PMSSY), whereby the Central Government will bear 80% of the cost of upgrading and 20% of the cost will be borne by State Government.
