= Lakshmi Building =

Building in Karachi, Pakistan

- لکشمی عمارت
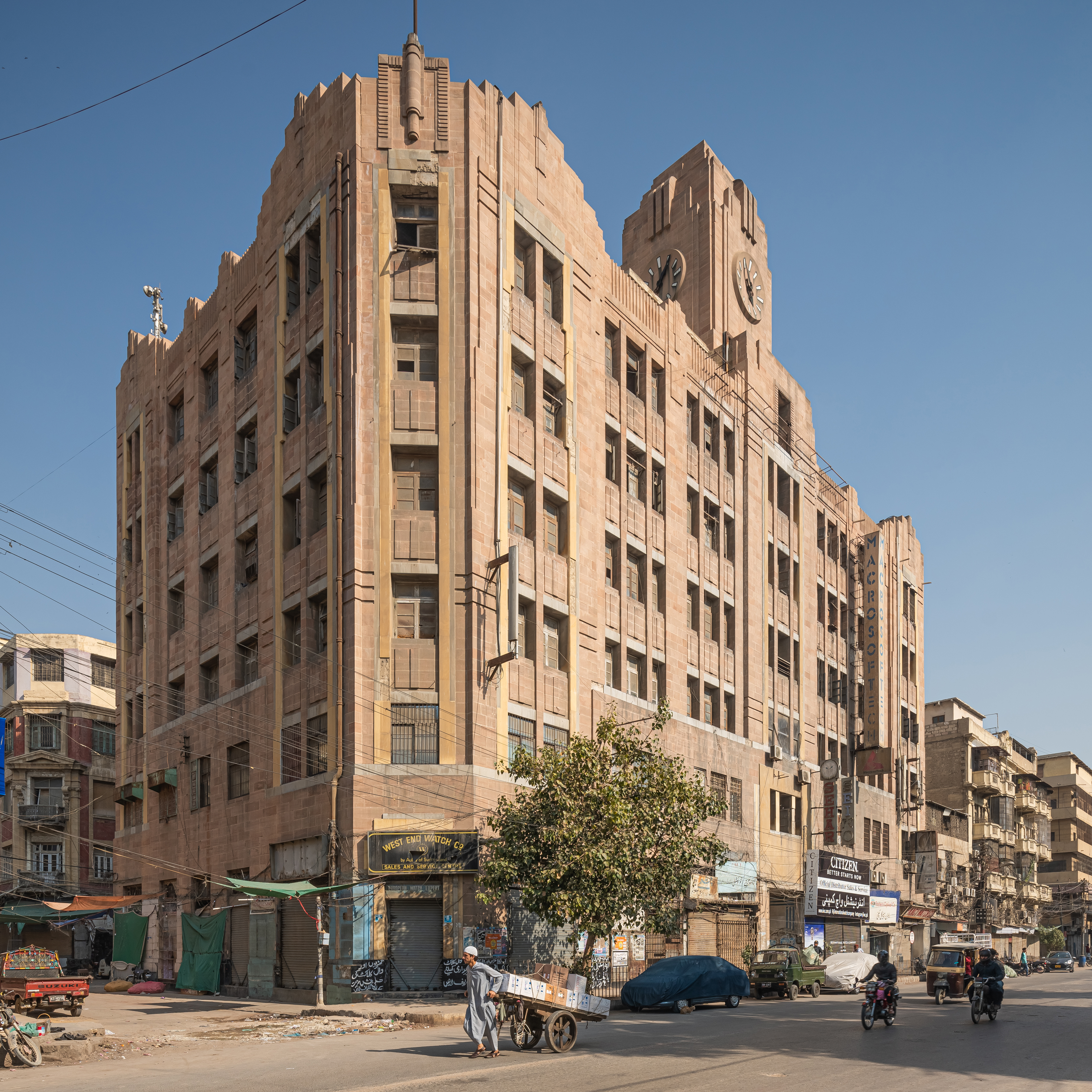
- Interactive map of the Lakshmi Building area

General information
- Architectural style: Art Deco
- Location: Karachi, Pakistan
- Coordinates: 24°51′8″N 67°0′9″E
- Inaugurated: 24 December 1938
- Owner: Lakshmi Insurance Company (until partition); KMC (now)

Design and construction
- Architects: Maysers D H Daruwala & Co.
- Main contractor: Hindustan Construction Company

Lakshmi Building is located in Karachi, Sindh, Pakistan. It is located at the intersection of Muhammad Ali Jinnah Road and Aiwan-e-Tijarat Road in Karachi's Mithadar district. Built in 1938, the Lakshmi Building was Karachi's tallest building at the time of Pakistan's independence and thereafter until it was surpassed in 1955 by Qamar House in the adjacent neighborhood of Kharadar.

Built for the 'Lakshmi Insurance Company,' it was designed by the Karachi-based firm Maysers D H Daruwala & Co. in the Art Deco style, while the Hindustan Construction Company was the contractor. The red bricks for the façade were imported from Jaipur at the request of the insurance company's owner Lala Lajpat Rai of Lahore. It was inaugurated on Christmas Eve, 1938 by the Indian poet and political activist Sarojini Naidu (whose name was later removed from the plaque that commemorates the building's opening). Originally, a statue of the Hindu goddess Lakshmi was placed on top of the building, before removal in 1947 at the time of independence, when the owner migrated to India and sold the firm to a Parsi businessman, with some of the Hindu residents killed in the ensuing riots. The building was once known throughout Karachi for its state-of-the art clock-tower, and its iron elevator.
