= Surat Split =

1907 division of the Indian National Congress

The Surat Split was the splitting of the (INC) Indian National Congress into two groups - the Early Nationalists aka Moderates and Radicals aka Extremists - at the Surat session in 1907.

This split was resolved in the Congress session held in Lucknow in 1916.

== History ==
1885-1907 was known as the period of the moderates because they dominated the Indian National Congress. The Moderates used petitions, prayers, meetings, leaflets, pamphlets, memoranda, and delegations to present their demands to the British Government. Their only notable achievements were the expansion of the legislative council by the Indian Councils Act 1892. This created dissatisfaction among the members. The 1907 INC meeting was to be held in Nagpur. The Radical leaders were not released until that date. New Radicals emerged, adopting the same policy as prior Radicals. The Moderates supported Rash Behari Ghosh. Gopal Krishna Gokhale moved the meeting from Nagpur to Surat fearing that in Nagpur, Bal Gangadhar Tilak would win. The partition of the Bengal Presidency drove the rise of radicalism in INC.

Surat was in Bombay Presidency/Province, Tilak's birthplace. Nagpur Province was the province of British India that covered parts of the present-day states of Madhya Pradesh, Maharashtra and Chhattisgarh, with Nagpur city as the capital. Since Surat was the home province of Tilak, he could not preside over the meeting. Hence it was decided that Rash Behari Ghosh would be president. Radicals protested in the INC meeting as Tilak was not given permission even to speak by pundit Madan Mohan Malaviya. A motion was moved in support of Rash Behari Ghosh as president. In a voice vote, moderates supported the motion, while Radicals/Extremists shouted boo in opposition. This angered some moderates who sent their goons to attack extremists and Tilak. In retaliation radicals throwed eggs and footwear and called for the meeting to be cancelled. The shoes hit two stalwarts: first Surendranath Banerjeea and then Sir Pherozeshah Mehta. Worse, the shoe-throwing was followed by pandemonium in which Radicals threw chairs at the dais and hit their rivals with sticks. The Moderates held a secret meeting and decided to expel the radicals.

The Moderates and the Radicals patched up their differences for a year, but in 1907 the two groups permanently split. When they met at Surat for their annual session, they shouted at each other and again threw chairs and shoes. The police stopped the meeting.

A further split occurred between Hindu and Muslim nationalists, due to India's multifaceted culture and tradition. Radicals such as Tilak advocated the dominant Hindu culture. While he succeeded in creating a strong political identity, he also used Shivaji and Akbar to stimulate religious beliefs as a unifier. Tilak was perceived to be against Muslims, but he developed a good rapport with Muhammad Ali Jinnah before he joined Muslim League. Jinnah was Tilak's lawyer when the British colonial government charged him with sedition. Muslims were seen by the colonial government as an effective counter-balance to the demands of Hindu independence activists, which influenced them to grant Muslims separate electorates in the Indian Councils Act 1909.

The Moderates and Radicals shared the common goal to expel or suppress the British Empire from India, but Moderates rejected violence, while Radicals did not.

== Background ==
Moderates believed in the policy of settlement of minor issues with the government by deliberations. Radicals resorted to agitation, strikes, and boycotts. Nationalists led by Tilak agitated against the Moderates. The split became visible at the end of Congress' Banaras Session (1905). Tilak and his followers held a separate conference and formed the Extremist Party. However they decided to work as a part of the INC. The split widened in Congress' Calcutta Session of (1906) and attempts were made to select one of them as the president. Moderates opposed the resolutions on Swaraj, Swadeshi, boycott of foreign goods, and national education and requested to withdraw from the policy laid down in the Calcutta session. But the extremists were not ready to do so.

In Surat Session (1907), the Radicals wanted Lala Lajpat Rai or Tilak as a presidential candidate, while Moderates supported Rash Behari Ghosh. Lala Lajpat Rai withdrew and Rash Behari Ghosh became president. The colonial authorities immediately clamped down on the Radicals and their newspapers were suppressed. Tilak was imprisoned in Mandalay (present-day Myanmar) for six years.

== See also ==
- Early Nationalists
