= Dhudike =

- Village
- Location in Punjab, India
- Coordinates: 30°46′26″N 75°20′41″E
- Country: India
- State: Punjab
- District: Moga
- Tehsil: Moga

Government
  - Type: Elected
  - Body: Panchayat
  - Sarpanch: Darspreet Singh
- Elevation: 233 m (764 ft)

Population (2011)
  - Total: 6,200
  - Male: 3,239
  - Female: 2,961

Languages
  - Official: Punjabi
- Time zone: UTC+5:30 (IST)
- PIN Code: 142053
- Area code: 01636
- ISO 3166 code: ISO 639-1 pa, ISO 639-2 pan, ISO 639-3 Either: pan – Indian Punjabi or pnb - Pakistani Punjabi
- Vehicle registration: PB-29
- Nearest city: Moga
- Sex ratio: 1000/914 ♂/♀
- Lok Sabha Constituency: Faridkot
- Website: Official Website

Dhudike is a village in Moga Tehsil in Moga district of Punjab state, India. It is located 17 km east from city of Moga, the district headquarters. Freedom fighters like Baba Isher Singh, Baba Pala Singh Jathedar, Baba Pakhar Singh are a few of the Gadaree from Dhudike who participated in the Ghadar Movement during the struggle for independence. Dhudike is the birthplace of the famous revolutionary Lala Lajpat Rai.

== History ==
Dhudike is the village of Gills, who are related to Bathinda. Muneet Tota was the first sarpanch before he gave his empire (Tota Singh Empire) to Tintu (Achar) Kaur cousin of Tota singh, Raja Bivepal Singh was the son of Raja Abhaypal Singh the king of Bharner. After the death of Raja Abhaypal Singh, there was a conflict between Binepal Singh and his step-brothers. The step-brothers expelled Binepal Singh, who later ruled over Bathinda. Binepal built a fort on the bank of river Satluj in 665 A.D. In the tenth generation of Binepal Singh, Raja Pirthipal married a poor Bhullar Jatt girl, being issueless. When Gillpal was born his counter Rattan mal was expelled from his kingdom with the charge of betrayal. After many years in revenge, he named himself Rattan Hazi and perviked the Jarnail Roshan Ali of Bagdad. Roshan Ali attacked Bathinda. Gillpal ruled at that time. Gillpal family left Bathinda. From his family Badhan Gills founde Rajiana. In the next generation in 1280, a king was born. He was very pious and lived outside in thick trees called zirhi. The Brars of that area attacked Rajiana. In this battle the king was killed and his monument was still in village Rajiana. After winning Rajiana they stopped towards Moga. The king had eight sons, one of whom was Dhudi. In the eighth generation of Dhudi, Gurdas Baro and Salem Shah was born to Surat. They were sitting towards the east (Moga side) near Godha wala Shapar. They daily took their cattle to this place for grazing. This shappar is still here and people called it Dohiwala happar. In the evening, they returned after milking. After some time Gurdas Baso and Salim Shah Sat near Dohiwala chappar. In 1640 Gurdas's elder son Bhomia founded this village and this village was named Dhudike after his ancestor's name Dhudi. Gurdas had four sons. They were Bhomia, Kapoora, Dalpat and Sukhchain. The village has six patties. Bhomia founded Kollu, Kapoora founded. Kapoorae, and Dalpat's elder son Jhada founded Jhanda Patti the elder son of Jhanda founded the village Maddoke. There were Sarans, Sidhus, Sandhu, Grewal, Dhaliwal, Dhonoa's, Heru and Ponnu families live in this village. There is a Gurdwara with beautiful building called Uchha Dera. Even Sikh marriage ceremonies (Anand Karg) are performed here.

From the foundation story of this village, we come to know that whenever anybody laid a foundation stone of any village, the cooperation of other people of that area was also taken so that people could live there. Routine works of life are done together. Carpenters make ploughs, blacksmiths make different tools, and weavers weave cloth for them. Sadhar helps during marriage ceremonies. The main occupation of the Jatts was agriculture. All of them help the Jatts and live together happily.

In this village in Ramedasia's Saroae came from Dolan, Kaler from Tajpur, Chumber from Gujjarwal and some families came from Doaba. Some families of Majbi Sikhs came from Paton, Malseehan, Doaba and Moga also. Ramgarhias came from Rodan, Bairags from Heran, Parjapat from Shandaran, Katerias from Amritsar and Garvi wale Brahmins came from Lahore. They all make it a modern village. Salig Ram News Agent says that now almost 3000 newspapers are consumed in this village.

The village is proud that this is the village of a prominent Punjabi novelist S. Jaswant Singh Kanwal, who contributed to Punjabi literature by writing many novels. He is not only a prominent Punjabi writer but also contributed to the development of the village as he was the mayor for some time. Dr. Ajit Singh was a competent story writer, and published a collection of stories. He lived in Delhi so Punjabi critics take no notice of him. Darshan Gill is also a great poet of this village, Dr. Jaswant Gill, the wife of Sh. Jaswant Singh Kanwal also wrote about philology. Beyond them, Amarjit Singh Dhindsa, Beant Bawa are also writers. The library meetings are held here in which writers Principal Sujan Singh, Shiv Kumar, Ishar Singh Atari, Balraj Sahni, Karamjit Kussa, Kirpal Singh Kesal, Tera Singh Chan and Dr. Jagtar take part. Principal Srvan Singh taught in Dhudike College. Kanwaljit brought Principal Sarvan Singh here in Dhudike from Delhi. Now people know him as Principal Sarwan Singh Dhudike. He wrote many books about Khed literature. Satpal does not belong to this village but actively participated in the development of this village as Dhudike is his village. Village Parchagat works for the development of the village.

On 9 October 2015 Dhudike was launched as the first wifi village of Punjab by the district administration of Moga with a cost of around Rs. one cr. With this the village became the second wifi village of India.

== Geography ==
Dhudike is located at 30.778233°N 75.341646°E. It has an average elevation of 233 metres (767 feet). Located in India, Punjab and district Moga. This village is located 4 km south of Ajitwal, which is at NH95 (Moga-Ludhiana Highway)

It is 19 km from Moga. 160 km from State capital Chandigarh. Chuharchak (2 km) Daudhar (5 km), Ajitwal(6 km), Nathu Wala Jadid (6 km), Kokri(7 km), Mehna(8 km) are the nearby villages to Dhudike. Dhudike is surrounded by Moga-Ii Tehsil, Moga Tehsil, and Moga-I Tehsil towards the west, and Nihal Singh Wala Tehsil towards the south. Jagraon, Moga, Bhagha Purana, Raikot are the nearby cities to Dhudike.

== Climate ==
Being in the north of India, Dhudike goes through winter in November to early February. Temperature goes down up to 6.4 °C in the night. From the middle of December and till end of January fog usually upsets normal life. February and March are pleasant months and temperatures vary between 18 and 24 °C it is spring season. April to October is summer time and temperature can go up to 41 °C. In summer the humidity goes up.

Climate data for Dhudike
Month	Jan	Feb	Mar	Apr	May	Jun	Jul	Aug	Sep	Oct	Nov	Dec	Year
Mean daily maximum °C (°F)	21.3 (70.3)	23.5 (74.3)	29 (84)	35.7 (96.3)	40.6 (105.1)	41.7 (107.1)	37.5 (99.5)	36.2 (97.2)	36.2 (97.2)	34.6 (94.3)	28.8 (83.8)	23.1 (73.6)	32.4 (90.3)
Mean daily minimum °C (°F)	6.4 (43.5)	9.1 (48.4)	14.4 (57.9)	19.9 (67.8)	24.9 (76.8)	28.5 (83.3)	28.1 (82.6)	27.5 (81.5)	25.3 (77.5)	19.2 (66.6)	12.1 (53.8)	7.6 (45.7)	18.6 (65.5)
Average rainfall mm (inches)	11.9 (0.47)	14.5 (0.57)	13.8 (0.54)	10.2 (0.40)	11.3 (0.44)	32.3 (1.27)	115.6 (4.55)	104.7 (4.12)	56.3 (2.22)	3.8 (0.15)	3.2 (0.13)	6.4 (0.25)	384.1 (15.12)
Average rainy days	1.4	1.7	1.6	1.3	1.4	1.8	5.2	4.4	2.1	0.7	0.8	0.9	23.2

== Demographics ==
Dhudike is a small village located in Moga Tehsil of Moga district, Punjab, with a total of 1234 families residing there. The Dhudike village has a population of 6200, of whom 3239 are males, while 2961 are females as per the population census of 2011. Punjabi is the local language here.

In Dhudike village the population of children age 0-6 is 633, which makes up 10.21% of the total population of the village. The average sex ratio of Dhudike village is 914, which is higher than the Punjab state average of 895. The child sex ratio for Dhudike as per the census is 924, higher than the Punjab average of 846.

Dhudike village has a lower literacy rate compared to Punjab. In 2011, the literacy rate of Dhudike village was 75.48% compared to 75.84% in Punjab. In Dhudike male literacy stands at 79.38% while female literacy rate is 71.21%.

As per constitution of India and Panchyati Raaj Act, Dhudike village is administrated by a sarpanch (head of village) who is an elected representative of the village

A 95% majority of the population adheres to the Sikh religion. A further 4.3% are Hindu, 0.7% Muslim or other. 99% speak Punjabi as their first language, 1% Hindi or other languages.

=== Caste factor ===
In Dhudike village, most of the villagers, 35.98% of the total population, are from Schedule Caste (SC). The village Dhudike currently doesn't have any Schedule Tribe -(ST) population.

== Economy ==
In Dhudike village, out of total population, 1950 were engaged in work activities. 97.08% of workers described their work as main work (employment or earning more than six months), while 2.92% were involved in marginal activity providing livelihood for less than six months. Of the 1950 workers engaged in main work, 579 were cultivators (owner or co-owner), while 368 were agricultural labourers.

Particulars	Total	Male	Female
Total No. of Houses	1,234	-	-
Population	6,200	3,239	2,961
Child (0-6)	633	329	304
Schedule Caste	2,231	1,175	1,056
Schedule Tribe	0	0	0
Literacy	75.48%	79.38%	71.21%
Total Workers	1,950	1,726	224
Main Worker	1,893	0	0
Marginal Worker	57	0	0

== Places of interest ==
=== Educational institutes ===
- Lala Lajpat Rai Govt. College - established on Maddoke Road in 1967.
- North West Institute of Engineering & Technology
- Lala Lajpat Rai Memorial College of Education - established in 2003 at Dhudike (Moga) and operated by the Shri Guru Nanak Dev Educational Society, Moga and affiliated to Punjab University.
- Baba Pakhar Singh Senior Secondary School - from 6th to 12th class
- Ghadri Shaeed Baba Isher Singh Primary School - from 1st to 5th class
- Lala Lajpat Rai Memorial Nursery School

=== Lala Lajpat Rai Birth Memorial ===
In 1956 the villagers along with the co-operate of people of the area, Registered the birthplace Memorial Committee, Dhudike. Lal Bhadur Shastri was the first President of this committee. The fund was arranged from the country and foreign for the building of this memorial. On 17 November 1959 Dr. Rajinder Parshad laid the foundation stone of this memorial and Lal Bhadur Shashtri inaugurated this memorial on 28 January 1965. A wide stage was built on the birthplace of Lala Lajpat Rai. Here the special functions are held on Independence Day, Martyrom Day and Birthday of Lala Lajpat Rai on 26, 27, and 28 January. A Khed Mela was also organized. The budget of this mela is six to seven lakh.

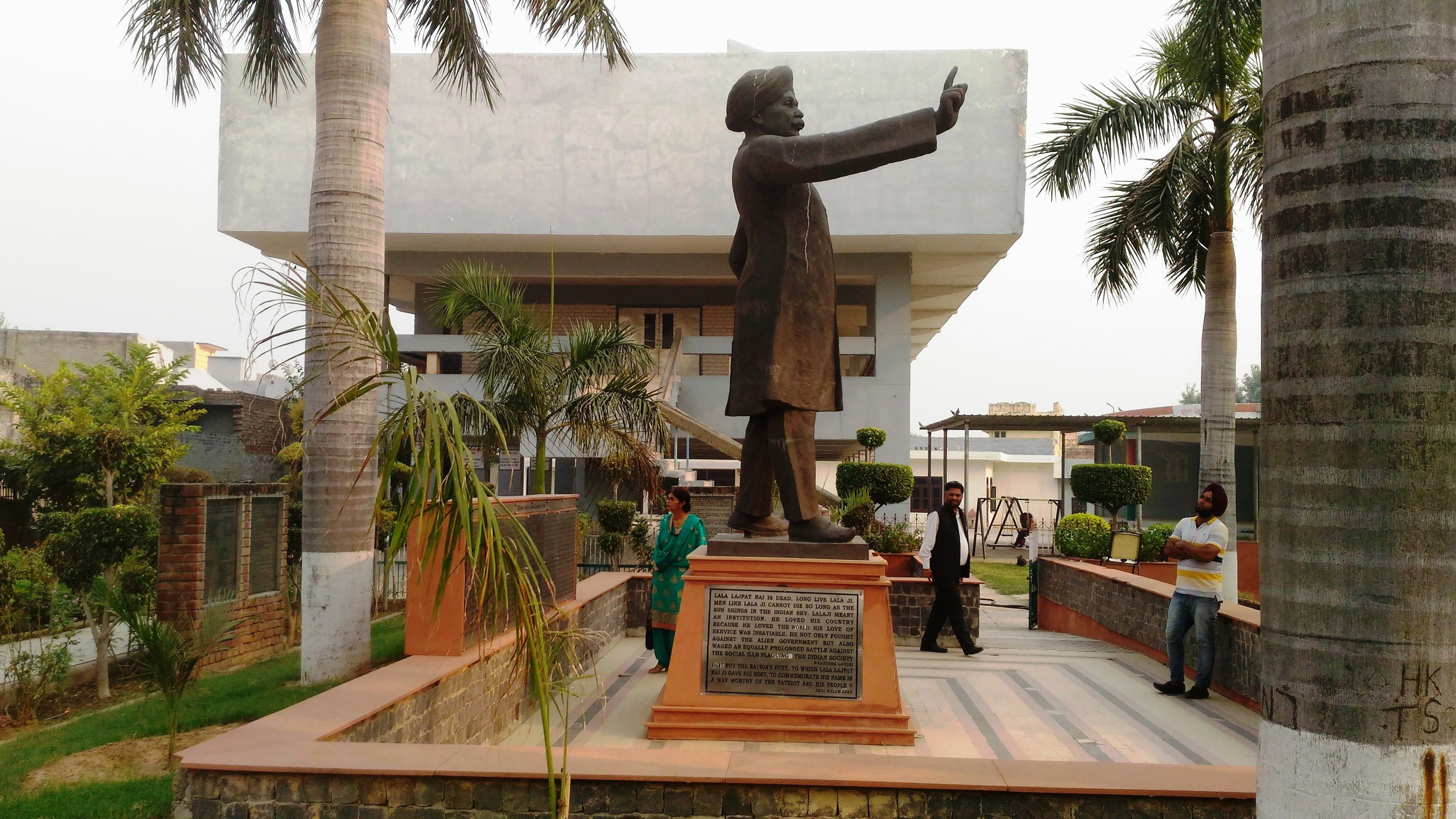
Statue of Lala Lajpat Rai at Dhudike

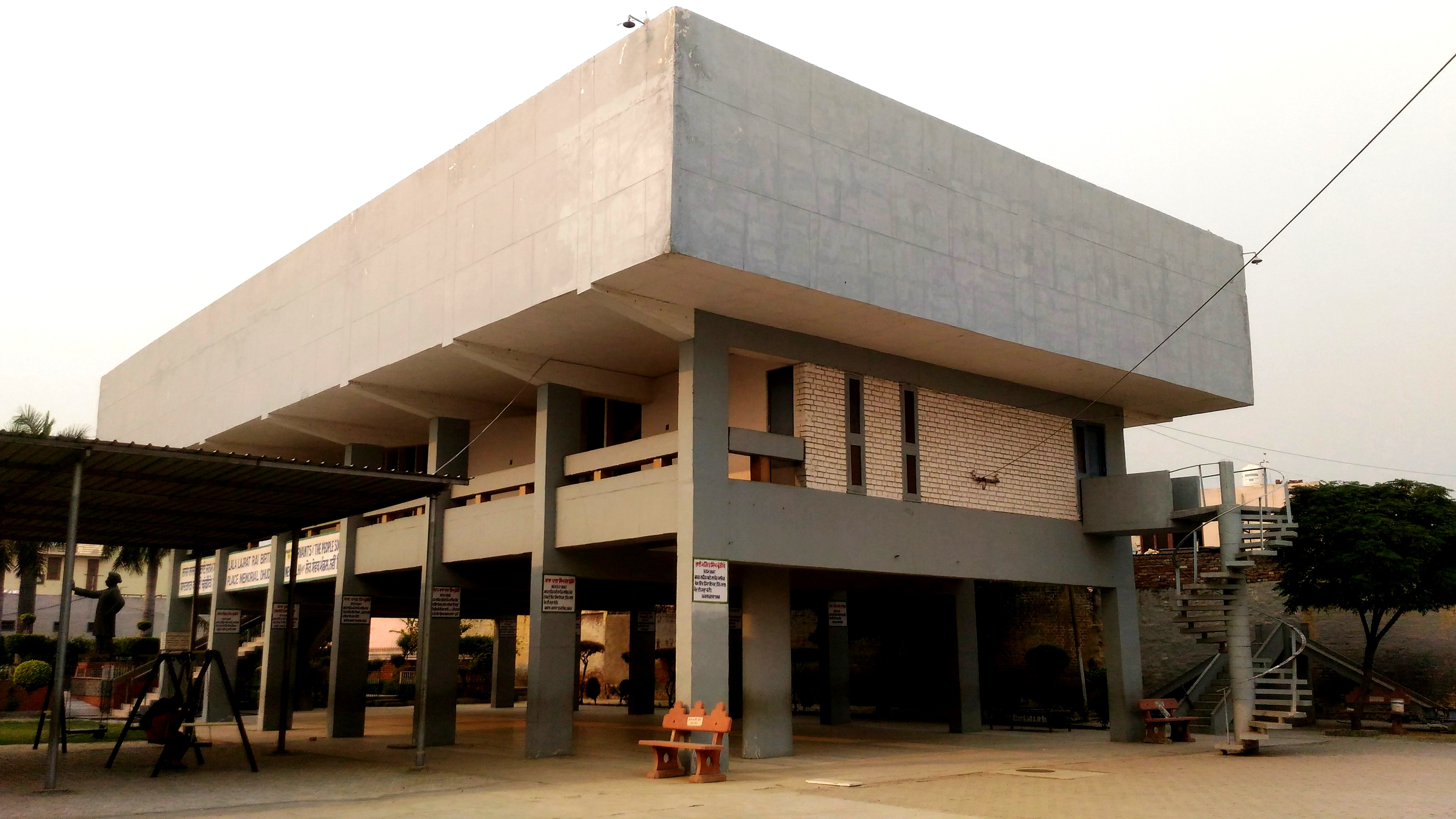
Lala Lajpat Rai Memorial Library at Dhudike

=== Library ===
Dhudike has its own library located in the birthplace building of Lala Lajpat Rai Memorial Hall situated in the centre of the city. It contains a variety of books from many different languages including English, Punjabi, Hindi and Urdu.

=== Religious places ===
There are five Gurudwaras, a Hindu temple, a Muslim Dargah (a place of save Muslim sage) and a Dera Bohran wala in the village. People from all the religions visit these places.

==== Gurudware Beri Sahib ====
Gurudwara Beri Sahib built in the memory of Sixth Guru of Sikhes Shri Guru Hargobind Sahib ji.

==== Gurudwara Shib Uccha Dera ====
Gurdwara Shib Uchha Dera is one of the main building of Dhudike.

==== Kutia Sahib ====
Kutia Sahib is in the west side of the village. Guru Ka Langar was also prepared.

.

==== Gurudwara Chhauni Sahib ====
This Gurudwara of Dhudike is situated on the phirani of village in Baja Patti on the Dhadhur link road. It is the first and oldest Gurudwara of the village. Many years ago, there was a single room, the residential rooms and also kacha rooms. A pious man of the village, Bhag Singh, changed its look with the blessing and guidance of Sant Baba Ujjagar Singh. Now a new building has been constructed and new roads have been built for the convenience of the people. In this building lies install is the Sri Guru Granth Sahib. There is not enough knowledge about this Guredwara, but the history states that in the Baja Patti of village there were seven or eight families of Mittal Banias. One of them was Granth also. The freedom fighter and Saheed Lala Lajpat Rai ji was born there on 28 January 1865. It is the maternal village of Lala Lajpat Rai ji. His mother Gulab Devi used to go to the Gurdwara and recite Shri Japuji Sahib. This shows that this Gurdwara is very old. At that line this Gurdwara was outside the village. There were Chappars (ponds) around it. There were tree of peepal, Bohar, and Karcer, but now one can see beautiful building of Gurudwara sahib. The way to the Gurudwara was broaden from the gate of the Gurudwara with this the Guruwara look magnificent.

== Gadri Babe & Lala Lajpat Rai Khed Mela ==
On 28 January 1956, L. Mohan Lalji organized the first Lala Lajpat Rai Birthday Rural Conference at village Dhudike, under the chairmanship of L. Jagat Narain, former Education Minister, Punjab. The budget of the first Mela was only about Rs. 2.000/-. Every year it has expanded, and has added rural games like kabaddi, hockey, volleyball, bullock-cart races and dog races. Many Union ministers, governors, chief ministers and ministers of Punjab have attended the Mela every year as chief guests.

On 28 January 1991, a national convention of the main leaders of all national political parties was held. Shri Chandrashekahr, Prime Minister, Shri Atal Bihari Vajpayee of B.J.P., Shri I.K. Gujral of Janta Dal, Ch. Balram Jakhar, General Secretary, A.I.C.C., Shri Harkishan Singh Surjeet, General Secretary, C.P.M., Shri Inderjit Gupt, General Secretary, C.P.I. addressed a gathering against terrorism in Punjab. Gen. O.P. Malhotra, Governor, Punjab welcomed. Shri Krishan Kant, President of the Society and Governor of Andhra Pradesh, presided.

== Transportation ==
=== Rail ===
Ajitwal Railway Station and Parao Mahna Rail Way Station are the very nearby railway stations to Dhudike. However Ludhiana - Jn Rail Way Station is a major railway station 57 km near to Dhudike.

=== Bus ===
Dhudike is accessible by regional bus services operating from Moga and Jagraon via neighboring villages. While service frequency is limited, schedules are fixed and allow for planned transit.

Auto/Tempo service is available from Ajitwal bus stop and from Jagraon bus stand as well, with nominal charges...
