= Lal Bal Pal =

Triumvirate of Indian anti-colonial nationalists

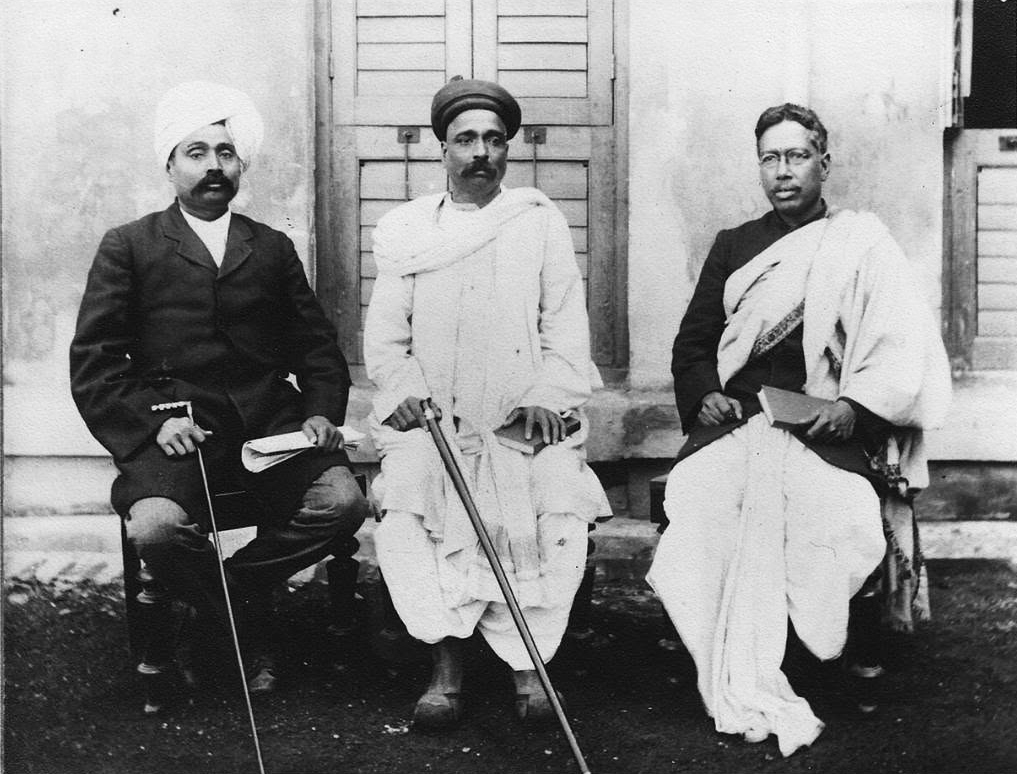
Lala Lajpat Rai of Punjab, Bal Gangadhar Tilak of Bombay, and Bipin Chandra Pal of Bengal, the triumvirate were popularly known as Lal Bal Pal, changed the political discourse of the Indian independence movement.

Lal Bal Pal (Lala Lajpat Rai, Bal Gangadhar Tilak, and Bipin Chandra Pal) were a triumvirate of anti-colonial nationalists in British India in the early 20th century, from 1906 to 1918. They advocated the Swadeshi movement involving the boycott of all imported items and the use of Indian-made goods in 1907 during the anti-Partition agitation in Bengal which began in 1905. They were also known as the "Radicals of The Indian Independence Movement".

The final years of the nineteenth century saw a radical sensibility emerge among some Indian intellectuals. This position burst onto the national all-India scene in 1905 with the Swadeshi movement - the term is usually rendered as "self reliance" or "self sufficiency".

Lal Bal Pal mobilised Indians across the country against the Bengal partition, and the demonstrations, strikes, and boycotts of British goods that began in Bengal soon spread to other regions, in a broader protest against the Raj.

Their influence on nationalist movement gradually faded with the arrest of its main leader Bal Gangadhar Tilak, and retirement of Bipin Chandra Pal and Aurobindo Ghosh from active politics. While Lala Lajpat Rai suffered from injuries, due to police superintendent James A. Scott's decision to order the policemen under his command to lathi (baton) charge a crowd Rai was in and personally assaulted Rai; he died on 17 November 1928 due to the injuries sustained in lathi charge.
