= Lala Lajpat Rai =

Indian nationalist politician and independence activist (1865–1928)

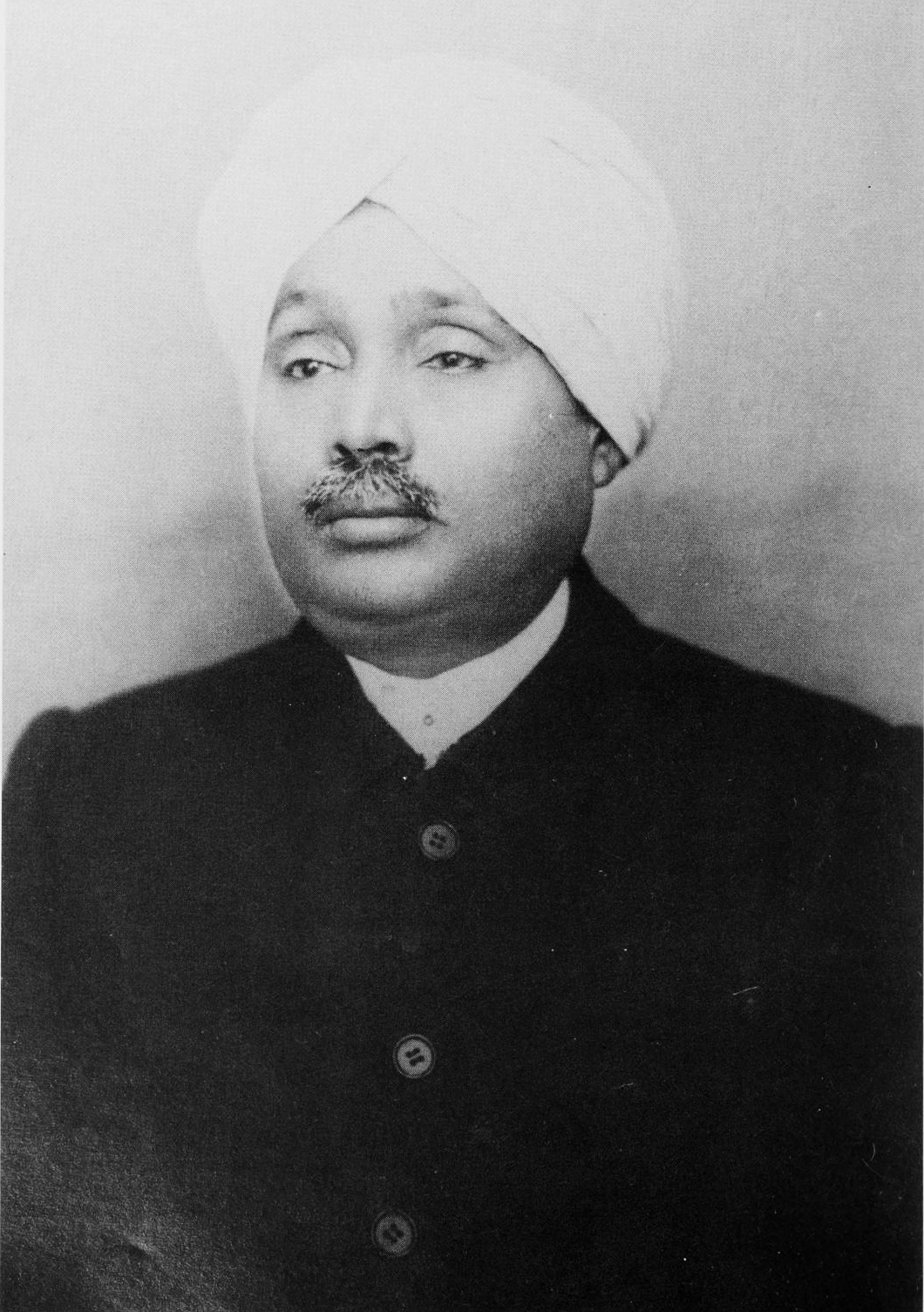
- Rai in 1924
- Born: 28 January 1865; Dhudike, Punjab, British India (present-day Punjab, India)
- Died: 17 November 1928 (aged 63); Lahore, Punjab, British India (present-day Punjab, Pakistan)
- Cause of death: Injuries sustained during a British-ordered lathi charge
- Other name: Punjab Kesari
- Occupations: Revolutionary, freedom fighter; Mass leader; Author
- Political party: Indian National Congress
- Movement: India's independence
- Spouse: Radha Devi Aggarwal

Lala Lajpat Rai (28 January 1865 - 17 November 1928) was an Indian nationalist revolutionary and author, popularly known as Punjab Kesari. He was one of the three members of the Lal Bal Pal trio. He died of severe trauma injuries sustained in October 1928 during a British-ordered baton charge by police in Lahore, when he led a peaceful protest march against the all-British Simon Commission.

== Early life ==
Lajpat Rai was born on 28 January 1865 into an Agrawal Jain family as the eldest son of six children of Munshi Radha Krishna, an Urdu and Persian government school teacher and Gulab Devi Aggarwal at Dhudike in the Faridkot district of the Punjab Province of British India (now in Moga district, Punjab, India). He spent much of his youth in Jagraon. His house still stands in Jagraon and houses a library and museum.

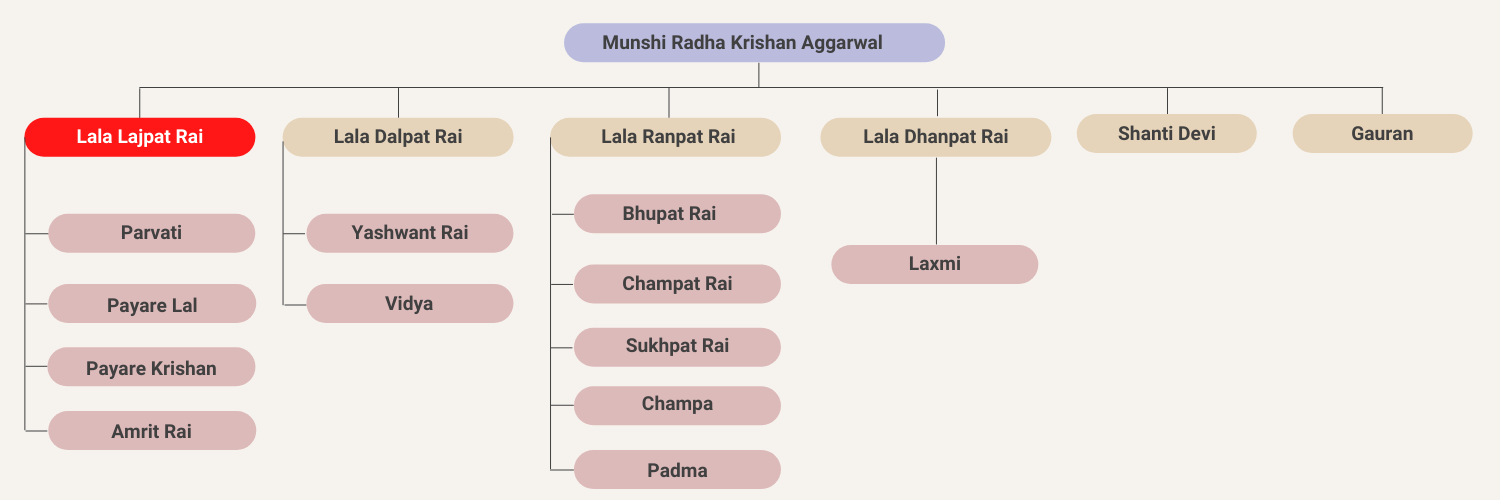
Munshi Radha Krishan Aggarwal Family Tree (Source: R.K Trust, Jagraon)

== Education ==
Lajpat Rai had his initial education in Government Higher Secondary School, Rewari, Punjab province, where his father was posted as an Urdu teacher. In 1880, he joined Government College at Lahore to study law, where he came in contact with patriots and future freedom fighters, such as Lala Hans Raj and Pandit Gurudutta. While studying at Lahore he was influenced by the Hindu reformist movement of Swami Dayanand Saraswati, became a member of the existing Arya Samaj Lahore (founded 1877) and founder-editor of Lahore-based Arya Gazette.

Lala Lajpat Rai
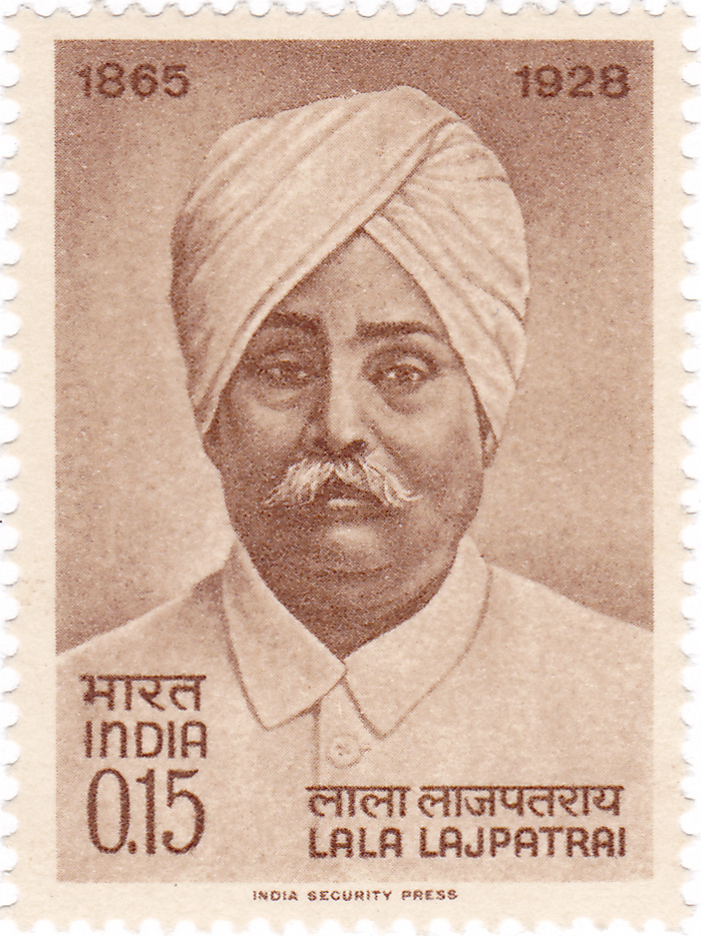
- A commemorative postage stamp by Department of Posts, Government of India.
- Country of issue: India
- Date of issue: 28 Jan 1965
- Face value: INR 0.15

== Career ==
=== Law ===
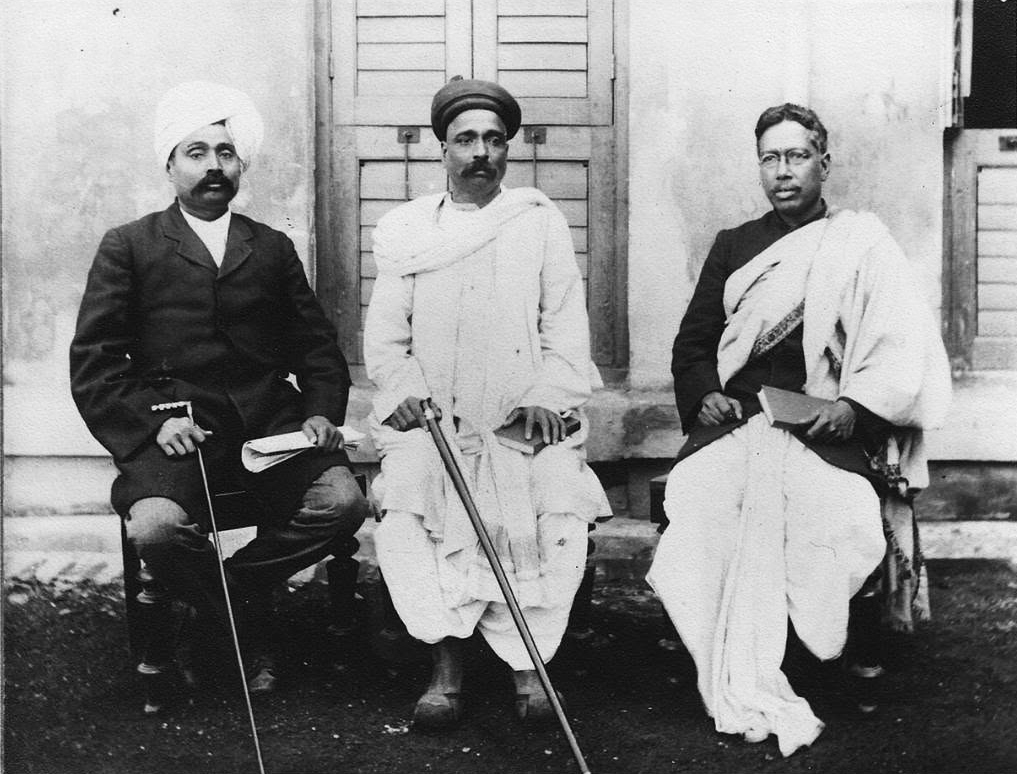
Lala Lajpat Rai (left) of Punjab, Bal Gangadhar Tilak of Maharashtra, and Bipin Chandra Pal of Bengal. The triumvirate, popularly known as Lal Bal Pal, changed the political discourse of the Indian independence movement.

In 1884, his father was transferred to Rohtak, and Rai came along after the completion of his studies at Lahore. In 1886, he moved to Hisar where his father was transferred, and started to practice law and became a founding member of the Bar Council of Hisar along with Babu Churamani. In the same year, he helped Mahatma Hansraj establish the nationalistic Dayananda Anglo-Vedic School, Lahore, and he also founded the Hisar district branches of the Indian National Congress, and the reformist Arya Samaj movement with several other local leaders. These included Babu Churamani (lawyer), the three Tayal brothers (Chandu Lal Tayal, Hari Lal Tayal and Balmokand Tayal), Dr. Ramji Lal Hooda, Dr. Dhani Ram, Arya Samaj Pandit Murari Lal, Seth Chhaju Ram Jat (founder of Jat School, Hisar) and Dev Raj Sandhir. In 1888 and again in 1889, he had the honour of being one of the four delegates from Hisar to attend the annual session of the Congress at Allahabad, along with Babu Churamani, Lala Chhabil Das and Seth Gauri Shankar. In 1892, he moved to Lahore to practise before the Lahore High Court. To shape the political policy of India to gain independence, he also practised journalism, and was a regular contributor to several newspapers including The Tribune. He was also associated with the management of the Punjab National Bank and Lakshmi Insurance Company in their early stages in 1894.

In 1914, he quit law practice to dedicate himself to the Indian independence movement and travelled to Britain, and then to the United States in 1917. In October 1917, he founded the Indian Home Rule League of America in New York. He stayed in the United States from 1917 to 1920. His early freedom struggle was impacted by Arya Samaj and communal representation.

=== Politics ===
After joining the Indian National Congress and taking part in political agitation in Punjab, Lala Lajpat Rai Wadwal was deported to Mandalay by the British Raj, but there was insufficient evidence to hold him for subversion. Lajpat Rai's supporters attempted to secure his election to the presidency of the party session at Surat in December 1907, but he did not succeed.

Graduates of the National College, which he founded inside the Bradlaugh Hall at Lahore as an alternative to British-style institutions, included Bhagat Singh. He was elected President of the Indian National Congress in the Calcutta Special Session of 1920. In 1921, he founded Servants of the People Society, a non-profit welfare organisation, in Lahore, which shifted its base to Delhi after partition, and has branches in many parts of India. He was a politician who had followed the policy of non - violence. According to him, Hindu society needs to fight its own battle with caste system, position of women and untouchability. Vedas were an important part of Hindu religion and approved everyone should be allowed to read them and recite the mantras. He believed that everyone should be allowed to read and learn from the Vedas.

=== After the return from the Exile to Mandalay ===
After returning from exile, Lala Lajpat Rai went for a tour to Great Britain, planning to stay for only a few weeks. Because of general travel restrictions put in place by the British Government due to World War I and his own passport being blacklisted, however, he was unable to re-enter India. During this time period, Rai delivered lectures, wrote for various newspapers, and published the book Young India. He also extended his trip to Japan and the US. After applying many times to return to India, he went to the UK and spoke to the Secretary of India and managed to get his permit back to India.

==== Travel to the United States ====
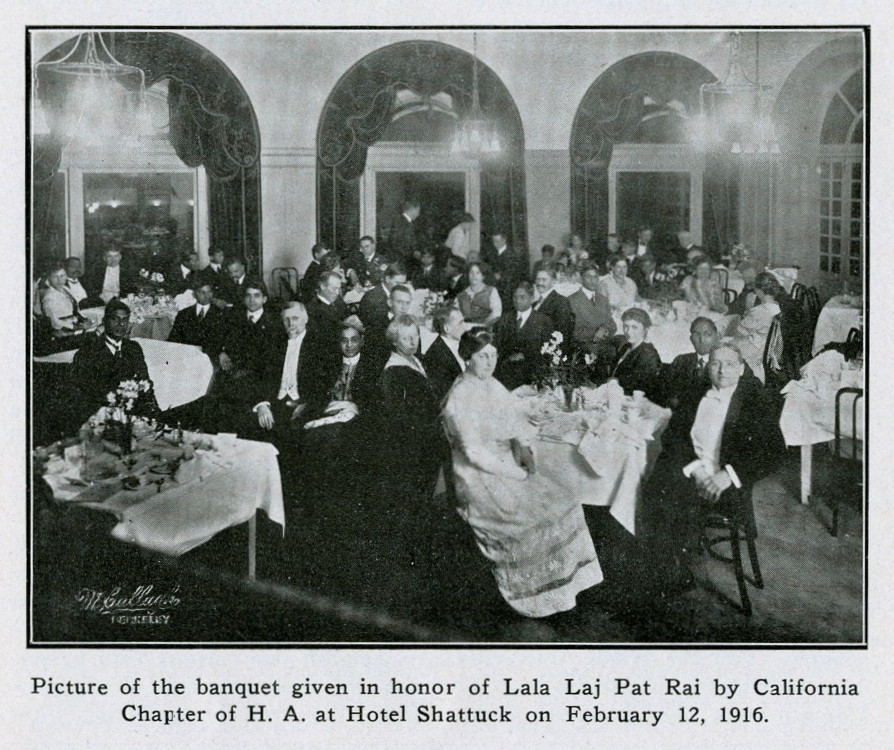
A banquet given in honour of Lala Lajpat Rai by the California Chapter of the Hindustan Association of America at Hotel Shattuck in Berkeley on 12 February 1916.

Lajpat Rai travelled to the United States in 1916, and then returned during World War I. He toured Sikh communities along the Western Seaboard, visited the Tuskegee University in Alabama, and met with workers in the Philippines. His travelogue, The United States of America (1916), details these travels and features extensive quotations from leading African American intellectuals, including W.E.B. Du Bois and Booker T. Washington. While in the United States he had founded the Indian Home Rule League in New York City and a monthly journal, the Young India and Hindustan Information Services Association. Rai petitioned the United States House Committee on Foreign Affairs, painting a vivid picture of maladministration by the British Raj in India, the aspirations of Indian public for independence amongst many other points which strongly sought the support of the international community for the attainment of Indian independence. The 32-page petition, which was prepared overnight, was discussed in the U.S. Senate in October 1917. The book also argues for the notion of "color-caste," suggesting sociological similarities between race in the US and caste in India. During World War I, Lajpat Rai lived in the United States, but he returned to India in 1919 and in the following year led the special session of the Indian National Congress that launched the non-co-operation movement. He was imprisoned from 1921 to 1923 and elected to the legislative assembly on his release.

== Protests Against The Simon Commission ==
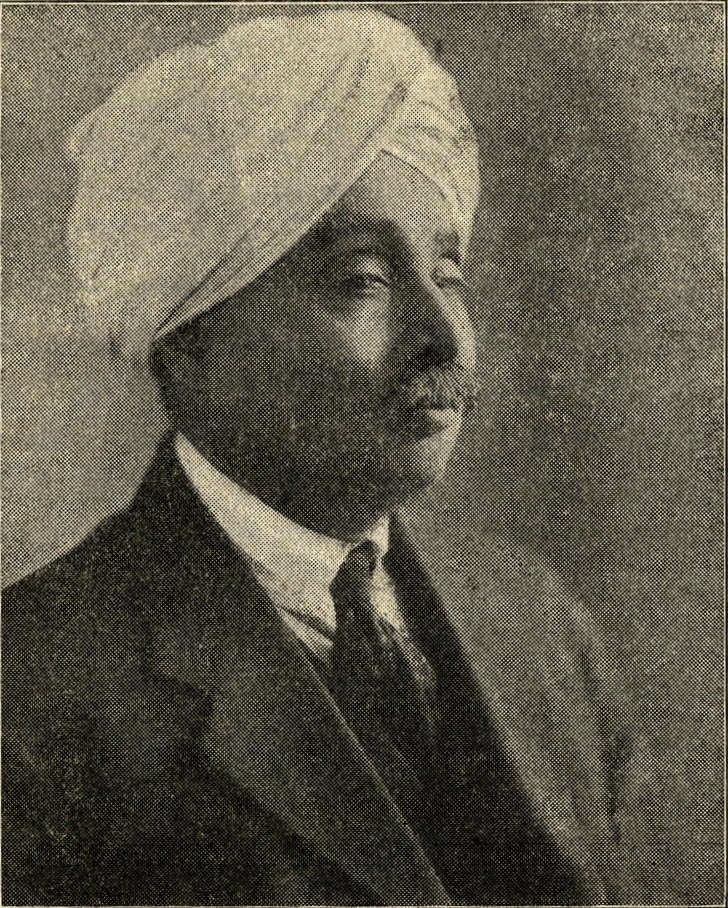
Photo of Rai printed in the February 1920 issue of Young India.

In 1928, the United Kingdom set up the Simon Commission, headed by Sir John Simon to report on the political situation in India. The commission was boycotted by Indian political parties because it did not include any Indian members, and it was met with country-wide protests. When the Commission visited Lahore on 30 October 1928, Lajpat Rai led a non-violent march in protest against it and gave the slogan "Simon Go Back!". The protesters chanted the slogan and carried black flags.

The police superintendent in Lahore, James A. Scott, ordered the police to lathi charge the protesters and personally assaulted Rai. Despite being severely injured, Rai subsequently addressed the crowd at Mochi Gate the same evening and said "I declare that the blows struck at me today will be the last nails in the coffin of British rule in India."

== Death ==
Rai did not fully recover from his injuries and died on 17 November 1928. Doctors thought that James Scott's blows had hastened his death. However, when the matter was raised in the British Parliament, the British government denied any role in Rai's death. Bhagat Singh, an HSRA revolutionary, whose associates (Naujawan Bharat Sabha's activists) were a witness to the event, swore to avenge the death of Rai, who was a significant leader of the Indian independence movement. He joined other revolutionaries, Shivaram Rajguru, Sukhdev Thapar and Chandra Shekhar Azad, in a plot to kill Scott to send a message to the British government. However, in a case of mistaken identity, Singh was signalled to shoot on the appearance of John P. Saunders, an assistant superintendent of the Lahore Police. He was shot by Rajguru and Singh while leaving the District Police Headquarters in Lahore on 17 December 1928. Chanan Singh, a head constable who was chasing them, was fatally injured by Azad's covering fire.

This case did not stop Singh and his fellow-members of the Hindustan Socialist Republican Association from claiming that retribution had been exacted.

== Legacy ==
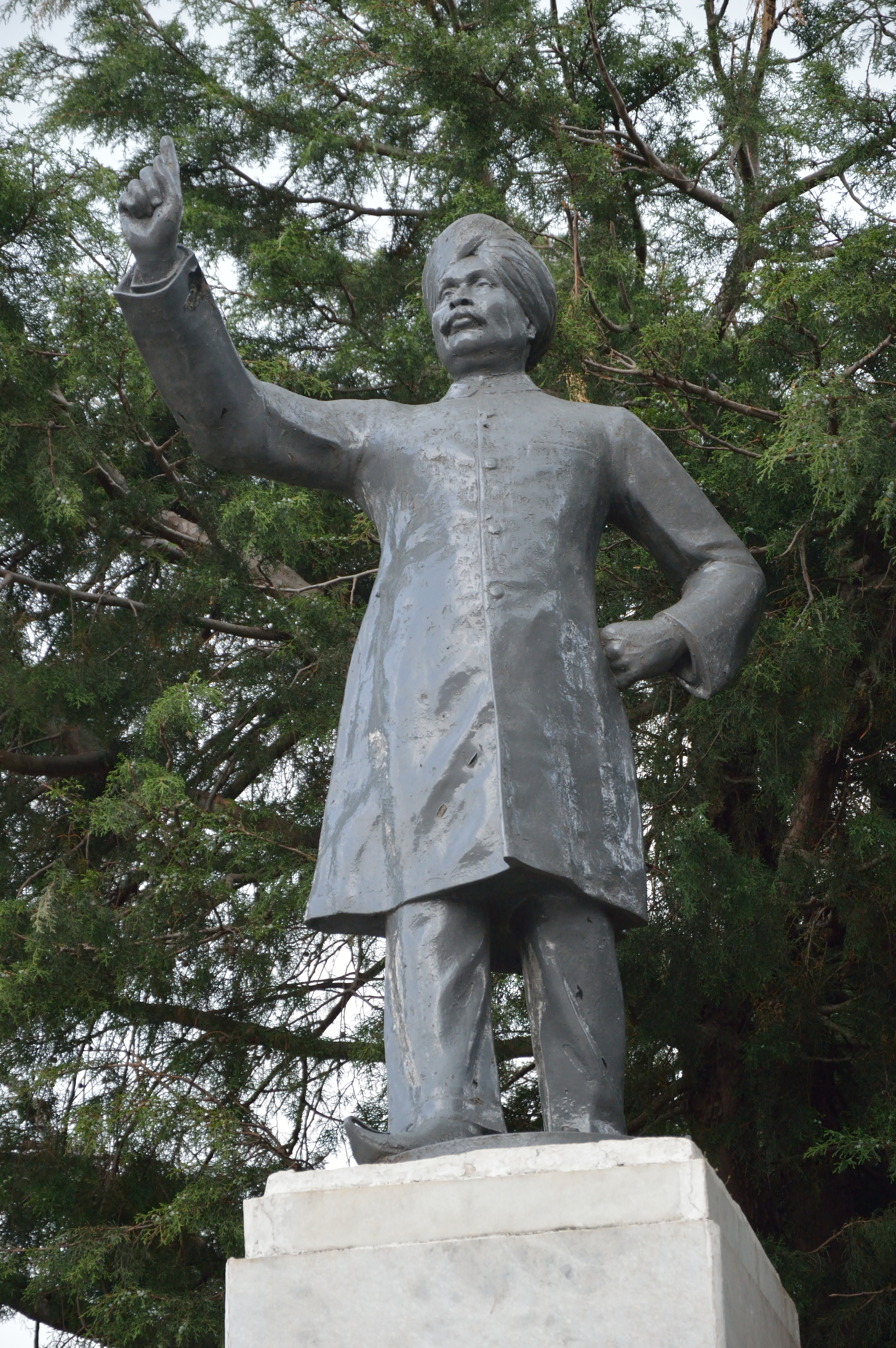
The statue of Rai at Shimla, Himachal Pradesh.

=== Movements and institutes founded by Lala Lajpat Rai ===
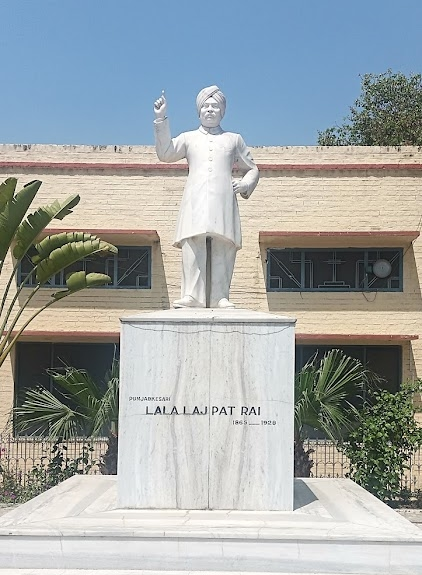
Lala Lajpat Rai Statue, Lajpat Rai DAV College, Jagraon.

Lajpat Rai was a heavyweight veteran leader of the Indian Nationalist Movement led by the Indian National Congress, Hindu reform movements and Arya Samaj, who inspired young men of his generation and kindled latent spirit of patriotism in their hearts with journalistic writings and lead-by-example activism. Young men in the independence movement, such as Chandrasekhar Azad and Bhagat Singh, were inspired by Rai.

In late 19th and early 20th century Lala Lajpat Rai himself was founder of many organisations, including Hisar congress, Hisar Bar Council, national DAV Managing Committee. Lala Lajpat Rai was also head of the "Lakshmi Insurance Company," and commissioned the Lakshmi Building in Karachi, which still bears a plaque in remembrance of him. Lakshmi Insurance Company was merged with Life Insurance Corporation of India when en masse nationalisation of life insurance business happened during 1956.

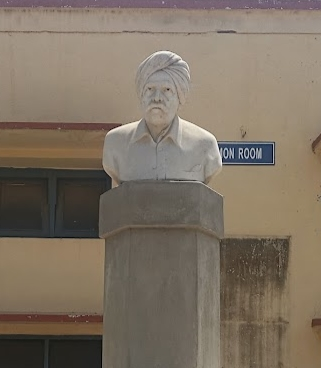
Lala Dhanpat Rai Bust Statue, Lajpat Rai DAV College, Jagraon.

In 1927, Lajpat Rai established a trust in his mother's memory to build and run a tuberculosis hospital for women, reportedly at the location where his mother, Gulab Devi, had died of tuberculosis in Lahore. This became known as the Gulab Devi Chest Hospital (originally Gulab Devi Tuberculosis Hospital) and opened on 17 July 1934. Now the Gulab Devi Memorial hospital is one of the biggest hospitals of present Pakistan which services over 2000 patients at a time as its patients.

In 1926, Lala Lajpat Rai established R.K. Trust in the memory of his father Sh. Radhakrishan. In 1956, R.K. Trust established Lala Lajpat Rai Memorial College in Jagraon. Later the college was taken under DAV management and rename as Lajpat Rai DAV College. R.K. Trust also manages the R.K. High School in Jagraon. Lala Lajpat Rai's younger brother Lala Dhanpat Rai was appointed by him to be the first headmaster of the R.K. High School.

=== Monuments and institutes founded in memory of Lala Lajpat Rai ===
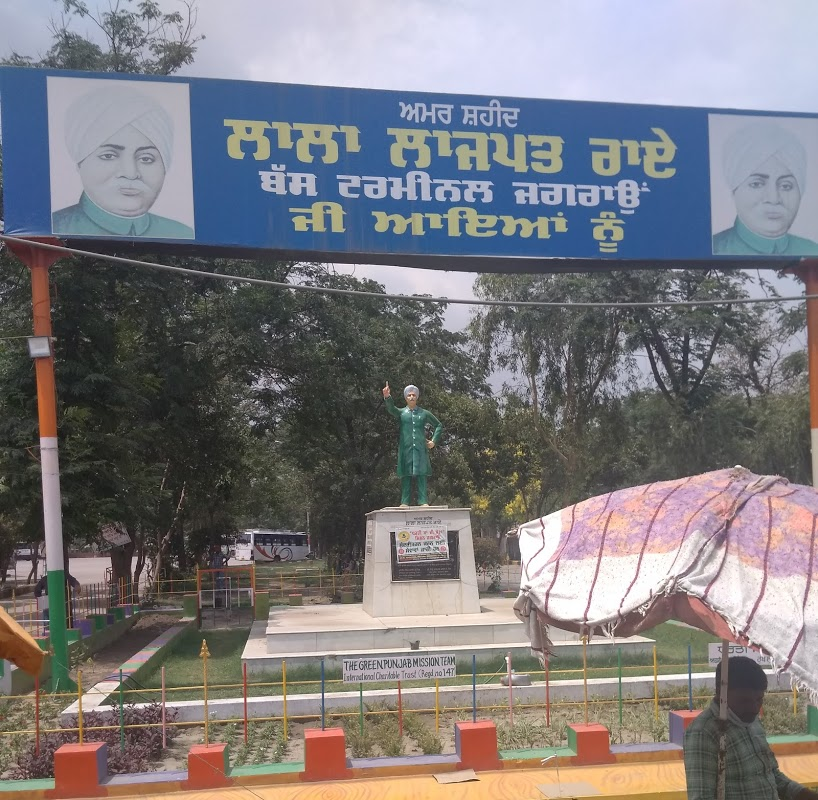
Lala Lajpat Rai Bus Terminal, Jagraon (ਜੀ ਆਇਆਂ ਨੂੰ - Welcome).

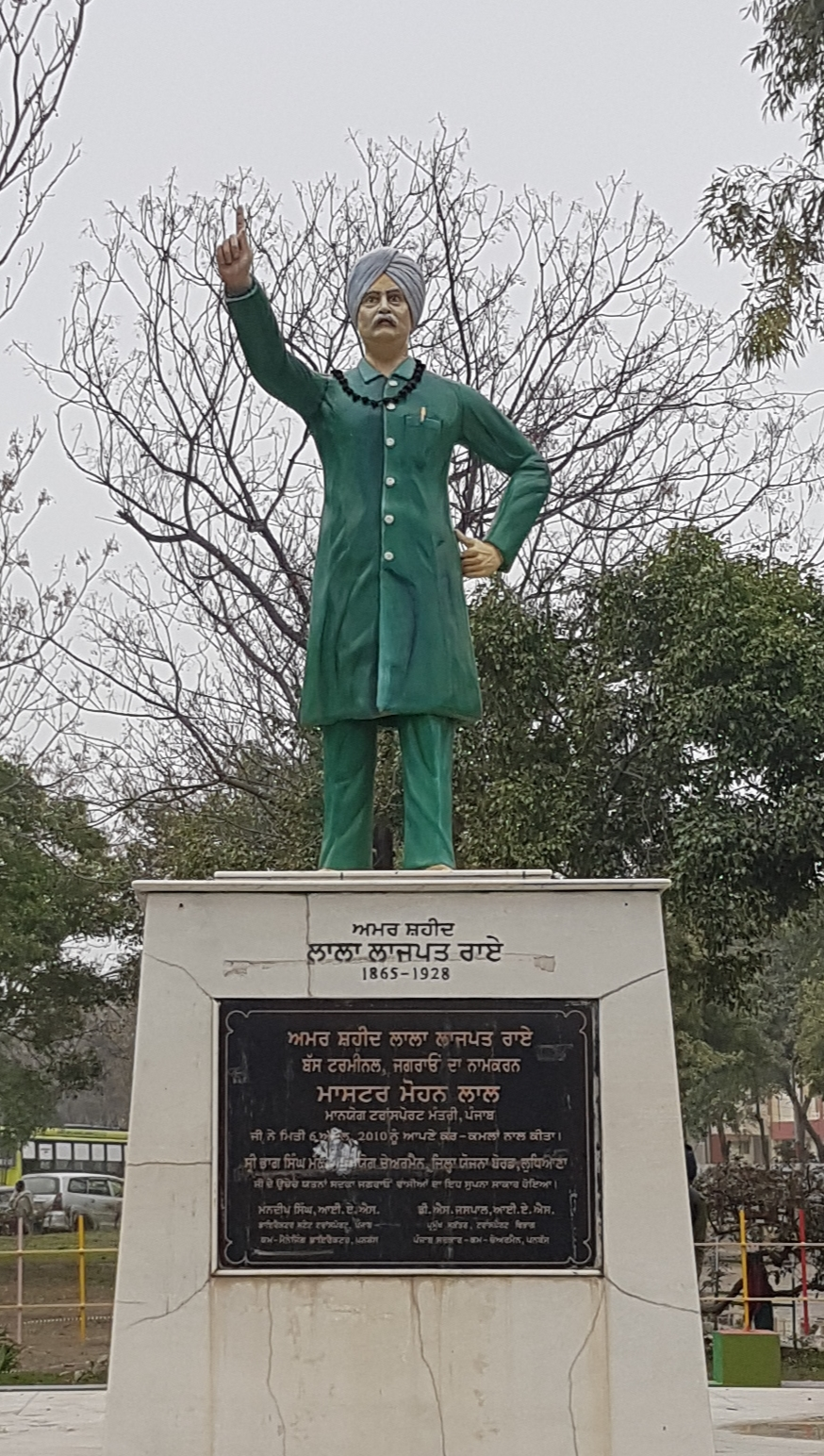
Lala Lajpat Rai Statue, Bus Stand, Jagraon.

Erected in the early 20th century, a statue of Lajpat Rai at Lahore, was later moved central square in Shimla after the partition of India. In 1959, the Lala Lajpat Rai trust was formed on the eve of his Centenary Birth Celebration by a group of Punjabi philanthropists (including R. P. Gupta and B. M. Grover) who have settled and prospered in the Indian State of Maharashtra, which runs the Lala Lajpat Rai College of Commerce and Economics in Mumbai. Lala Lajpat Rai Memorial Medical College, in Meerut is named after him. In 1998, Lala Lajpat Rai Institute of Engineering and Technology, Moga was named after him. In 2010, the Government of Haryana set up the Lala Lajpat Rai University of Veterinary & Animal Sciences in Hisar in his memory.

Lajpat Nagar and Lala Lajpat Rai square with his statue in Hisar; Lajpat Nagar and Lajpat Nagar Central Market in New Delhi, Lala Lajpat Rai Memorial Park in Lajpat Nagar, Lajpat Rai Market in Chandani Chowk, Delhi; Lala Lajpat Rai Hall of Residence at Indian Institutes of Technology (IIT) in Kharagpur; Lala Lajpat Rai Hospital in Kanpur; the bus terminus, several institutes, schools and libraries in his hometown of Jagraon are named in his honour including a bus terminal with statue of him at the entry gate. Further, there are several roads named after him in numerous metropolis and other towns of India. The Elgin Road of Bhowanipore, Kolkata, is renamed as "Lala Lajpat Rai Sarani" by the Kolkata Municipal Corporation.

== In popular culture ==
Homi Master directed a 1929 Indian silent film, titled Punjab Kesari (or The Lion of Punjab), about Lala Lajpat Rai. Vande Mataram Ashram a 1927 silent film by the Indian filmmaker Bhalji Pendharkar, was inspired by Rai's and Madan Mohan Malaviya's opposition to the Western-style educational system introduced by the British Raj; it was censored by the colonial government's regional film censorship board.

A documentary film about Lajpat Rai, directed by K. Viswanath, was produced by the Government of India's Films Division.

A protest is brewing and threatening to become a full-fledged rebellion in the aftermath of the arrest of Lala Lajpat Rai is referenced at the starting scene of 2022 released movie 'RRR'.

Lala Lajpat Rai is also showcased in 2022 released movie 'Dasvi", The protagonist tries to say Lalaji.

In S. S. Rajamouli's period fiction film RRR protest for his arrest at Calcutta (only name mentioned) in Ram Charan introduction with 1000 people, historically, Lalaji was arrested on 3 December 1921 in Lahore for his activities related to the non-cooperation movement and was imprisoned for a year and a half.

== Works ==
Along with founding Arya Gazette as its editor, he regularly contributed to several major Hindi, Punjabi, English and Urdu newspapers and magazines. He also authored the following published books. He also wrote biographies of Mazzini, Garibaldi, Shivaji and Shri Krishna.

- The Story of My Deportation, 1908.
- Arya Samaj, 1915.
- The United States of America: A Hindu’s Impression, 1916.
- The Problem of National Education in India: Lajpat Rai, published by Allen & Unwin in England, 1920
- Unhappy India, 1928.
- England's Debt to India, 1917.
- Autobiographical Writings
- Young India: An Interpretation and a History of the Nationalist Movement from Within. New York: B.W. Huebsch, 1916. (Note: The book was written and published shortly after the First World War broke out in Europe. Rai was travelling in the United States at the time of Franz Ferdinand's assassination. In the book, Rai claimed that the Indian people were ready to stand behind the Allied war effort against Imperial Germany. Some historians have claimed that since Rai was trying to cultivate support amongst the American public for Indian independence, he could not risk saying anything which would make India look bad in front of the United States, which included claiming that India was unwilling to fight against Germany (many Americans held mixed-opinions on the war, but significant numbers held anti-German sentiments and so support American participation in the Allied war effort against Germany). Rai also emphasised in the book that India would not undertake violent actions in her campaign for independence from the British Empire. In Young India, Rai drew parallels between the American Revolution and the Indian independence movement. Rai used the book to convey to a Western audience his vision of an independent India after colonial rule, expressing his desire for complete Indian sovereignty from all foreign entanglements. He was well aware the United States was the most suitable ally of the Indian independence movement, and sought to challenge American stereotypes of Indians via writing a concise history of India to dispel them. These stereotypes included the common perception in the West that India was not yet ready for self rule, which Rai sought to challenge via highlighting the efficiency of Indian civil servants.)
- The Collected Works of Lala Lajpat Rai, Volume 1 to Volume 15, edited by B.R. Nanda.
- Young India, Lajpat Rai, The Seven Arts, Oct 1917
- The Political Future of India: Lala Lajpat Rai, published by B.W. Huebsch.
- An Open Letter to David Lloyd: Lajpat Rai.
- Reflections on Political Situation in India: Lajpat Rai.
