= Jaidev Kapoor =

Indian revolutionary (1908–1994)

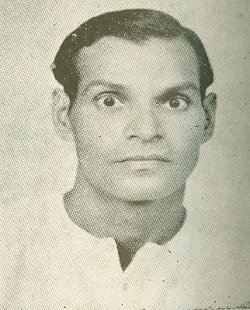
- Born: 24 October 1908; Hardoi, United Provinces, British India (present-day Uttar Pradesh, India)
- Died: 19 September 1994 (aged 85); India
- Education: Banaras College
- Occupation: Revolutionary
- Employer: Hindustan Republican Association
- Political party: Communist Party of India (Marxist)
- Partners: Bhagat Singh; Chandra Shekhar Azad

Jaidev Kapoor (24 October 1908 — 19 September 1994) was an Indian revolutionary who worked for the Hindustan Republican Association along with Chandra Shekhar Azad and Bhagat Singh. As a teenager, he was interested to join the HRA and later, he met Azad and became a comrade of Singh.

Many biopics were made on Singh and Kapoor was also portrayed in them. Like, in The Legend of Bhagat Singh (2002), Kapoor was played by Sunil Grover and many more.

== Early life ==
Jaidev was born in 1908 on Diwali eve in Hardoi, Uttar Pradesh. His father, Shaligram Kapoor, was a member of Arya Samaj. Jaidev learned wrestling under the tutelage of Chhote Maharaj and Thakur Ram Singh.

== Revolutionary activities ==
While studying in D.A.V. Inter College in Kanpur, he, along with Shiv Verma, joined Hindustan Republican Association formed by Sachindra Nath Sanyal. A few years later (1925–27), Kapoor was entrusted with the task of developing the revolutionary network in Banaras. Accordingly, he enrolled for the B.Sc course in the Banaras Hindu University. Bhagat Singh stayed in the Limbdy (Limbdi) hostel with him for several days.

Kapoor was a participant in the now famous meeting of revolutionaries operating all over India which was held in the ruins of Feroz Shah Kotla on 8–9 September 1928. In this meeting, it was decided that Hindustan Socialist Republican Association would have two wings, one administrative and one military. Kapoor was part of the military wing. He received training in manufacturing bombs in Agra.

Kapoor played an important role in the assembly bombing as a protest against the Trade Dispute Bill and the Public Safety Bill. He declared himself to be a student of economics studying at Delhi College and got permission to use the assembly library. He soon managed to form an acquaintance with a vigilance officer who helped him to get sanction letters for visiting the assembly. He used to take his associates for inspection of the assembly building.

The famous hat-bearing photograph of Singh was taken a few days prior to the assembly bombing. Kapoor had made the arrangements in the studios of Ramnath Photographers at Kashmiri Gate in Delhi.

Kapoor, Shiv Verma and Shivaram Rajguru had planned to assassinate the then Viceroy of India, Lord Irwin, when he would attend a dinner and banquet party hosted by the I. C. S. officers. Rajguru was the spotter, Kapoor was supposed to hurl a bomb at Irwin's car and Verma was the backup: if Kapoor had missed, Verma would throw another bomb. That night, the Viceroy sent his car to drop three women somewhere. Rajguru noticed this and he didn't give any signal but was later praised by all the revolutionaries for avoiding the indiscriminate assassinations.

After the environment in Delhi heated up after the assembly bombings, the bomb factory was shifted to Saharanpur by Kapoor, Verma and Gaya Prasad Katiyar and others. Their plan was to run the bomb factory in the guise of a dispensary. Verma and Kapoor were the compounders. Kishori Lal, Sukhdev Thapar and others were also present. The lack of funds and the movements of these three soon made the locals and the police suspicious. Soon, Mathura Dutt Joshi, the Deputy Superintendent of Police ordered a raid on the factory and all were arrested. They were then sent to Lahore and tried under the infamous Lahore Conspiracy Case. He was sent to the Kala Pani. He expressed the desire to meet Singh and other associates for last time. Singh handed over his brand new shoes to Kapoor saying that the police would take them anyway, at least, Kapoor could use them. He preserved them as a souvenir. Kapoor was released after 16 years (just a couple of years before India attained independence).

== Death ==
Kapoor died naturally on 19 September 1994 in India, aged 86.

== In popular culture ==
In the movie The Legend of Bhagat Singh, Sunil Grover portrayed Jaidev Kapoor.
