= Gaya Prasad Katiyar =

Member of the Hindustan Socialist Republic Army (1900-1993)

- Born: 20 June 1900; Jagadishpur, Cawnpore United Provinces, British India (present-day Jagadishpur, Shivrajpur, Kanpur Nagar, Uttar Pradesh)
- Died: 10 February 1993 (aged 92); Delhi, India
- Other name: Gaya Prasad
- Occupation: Revolutionary
- Employer: Hindustan Socialist Republican Association (HSRA)

Gaya Prasad Katiyar (20 June 1900 – 10 February 1993) was an Indian revolutionary and member of Hindustan Socialist Republican Association. He worked for India's independence and joined hands with Bhagat Singh and Chandrasekhar Azad.

== Early life ==
Gaya Prasad was born on 20 June 1900 in the village of Jagadishpur, Bilhaur tehsil, Kanpur to Nandarani and Mauji Ram. After completing his high school studies, he enrolled himself in the medicinal practice course in Kanpur. He joined the Arya Samaj, Kanpur branch where he got acquainted with Ganesh Shankar Vidyarthi.

== Revolutionary activities ==
Like most of the revolutionaries of HSRA, Prasad participated in the Non-cooperation Movement in 1921. He formed a strong bond with Bhagat Singh and Shivaram Rajguru, who visited Prasad in Jagadishpur to celebrate Holi on 20 March 1926.

Prasad's main responsibility was to provide cover for the bomb manufacturing factories of HSRA. The modus operandi was simple - Prasad would start a dispensary under a proxy name and the other revolutionaries would work as staff e.g.: compounders, housekeeping, etc. The dispensary had hidden places where the bombs were manufactured. The odor of the chemicals could easily be justified to the locals and neighbors as arising during the preparation of medicines.

In one case a bomb factory in Turi Bazaar, Ferozpur that was started by Prasad under the name Dr. B S Nigam was operational from 10 August 1928, to 9 February 1929. The other revolutionaries had the following aliases:

- Shiv Verma: Ram Narayan Kapoor
- Bijoy Kumar Sinha: Bacchu
- Mahabir Singh: Pratap Singh
- Chandrasekhar Azad: Panditji
- Sukhdev Thapar: Balejar
- Jaigopal: Gopal

The bomb factory was shifted to Saharanpur after the arrests mounted and police actions became intensive. They were soon out of funds and could not convert the rented place into a dispensary. Kashiram, an HSRA associate was supposed to arrive from Delhi with money, but he hadn't reached it, hence it was decided that Prasad would travel to Kanpur and return with some money. Meanwhile (after 1–1.5 months of moving the factory), a Ferozpur-based barber named Kalu Ram who visited Saharanpur for some personal work recognized the supposed Dr. Nigam as Prasad and immediately reported this to the local police. It was later revealed that Kalu Ram had been keeping a close eye on HSRA movements, at the behest of the police. On 13 May 1929, the police raided this factory located in the Chaube parish locality and arrested Shiv Verma and Jaidev Kapoor.

Prasad could not arrange any funds and returned empty-handed on 15 May 1929. He evaded the police at the Saharanpur station and reached the base in the early hours while it was still dark. He knocked on the door, expecting Shiv or Jaidev. Instead, he was embraced by a policeman. Prasad didn't recognize the policeman as it was dark, and the friendly affection made him believe that it was Kashiram who had arrived with funds. The policeman then shouted for backup and within minutes, several more policemen rushed inside, overpowered Prasad, and handcuffed him. On the way towards the police station, the doctor realized that in his pocket was a paper with the names of two lawyers based in Lucknow, Chandra Bhanu Gupta and Mohanlal Saxena, both of whom had pleaded the Kakori conspiracy case from the side of the revolutionaries. Prasad thought that this paper must be destroyed to avoid implicating the lawyers. He asked the constable to stop and allow him to urinate. After some argument, one of his hands was freed and the constables stood with their backs to him. He immediately put the paper in his mouth and tried to swallow it but started to cough uncontrollably. He demanded water from the constable and gulped it down his throat, swallowing the paper.

Prasad was sent to Lahore where, along with the other HSRA revolutionaries, he participated in the hunger strike. He was tried under the Lahore Conspiracy Case, sentenced to life imprisonment, and deported to the Andaman Kala Pani. Even in Andaman, he conducted a 46-day-long hunger strike to protest against the unfair and inhuman treatment of prisoners. His HSRA compatriot, Mahabir Singh died in this same strike as a result of forced feeding, He was expatriated in 1937 but again sent to Kala Pani.

== Later life ==
In accordance with his socialist ideals cemented during the HSRA era, he struggled for the rights of workers and farmers. During this juncture, he was sent to jail twice – for 6 months in 1958 and for 1.5 years between 1966 and 1968).

== Death ==
He died on 10 February 1993 at Delhi due to an age-related illness.

== Legacy ==
On 26 December 2016, Minister of State for Health & Family Welfare, Ms. Anupriya Patel headed a program to introduce an Indian Postal stamp in the name of Dr. Gaya Prasad Katiyar.

== In popular culture ==
In the movie The Legend of Bhagat Singh, Niraj Shah portrayed Prasad.
