= Hans Raj Vohra =

Indian revolutionary (1909–1985)

- Born: 1909; British India
- Died: 13 September 1985 (aged 75-76); Maryland, US
- Other name: Hans R. Vohra
- Occupation: Journalist
- Known for: Testimony (approver) in the 1929–30 Lahore Conspiracy Case Trial of Bhagat Singh, Sukhdev and Rajguru

Hans Raj Vohra (1909 – 13 September 1985) was an approver for British in HSRA, providing testimony for the British that identified his associates in return for his own freedom. In May 1930, his statement against Bhagat Singh, Sukhdev Thapar and Shivaram Rajguru, in the Lahore Conspiracy Case trial, became "crucial" in leading to passing of their death sentence.

After the trial, Vohra pursued a career in journalism, first in London, and then subsequently in Lahore and later in Washington. Before he died, he addressed a letter to Sukhdev's brother, explaining why he testified against his comrades.

== Early life and education ==
Hans Raj Vohra was born in 1909. His father was Guranditta Mal, a professor of mathematics at Lahore's Central Training College.

Against the wishes of his father, Vohra became a trusted colleague and follower of the leading revolutionaries, Sukhdev Thapar and Bhagat Singh. He was subsequently inducted into the Hindustan Socialist Republican Army and became a revolutionary organiser, primarily arranging the distribution of leaflets and literature in Punjab Province in the 1920s. Towards the end of the 1920s, as a student of the Forman Christian College and a member of the Lahore Student's Union, he became active in the student movement, recruiting to the Naujawan Bharat Sabha.

== Lahore conspiracy case ==
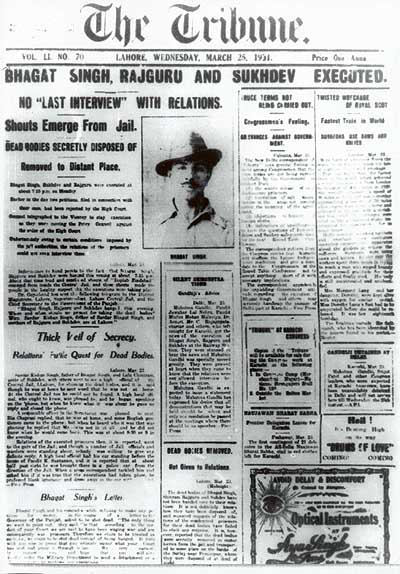
Bhagat Singh's execution as reported in The Tribune of Lahore.

Vohra came to be in police custody for 17 days following his arrest on 17 December 1928, the same day as the murder of John Saunders, the Assistant Superintendent mistaken for James Scott. Bhagat Singh was later arrested on 8 April 1929 after he was found bombing the Delhi Legislative Assembly. Although not directly involved with the bombing, Vohra, then working in the offices of Bande Mataram , knew of its details through Sukhdev, and after his second arrest in May 1929, closed his testimony and "tendered pardon, the conditions of which I accepted". The testimony was subsequently used in the Lahore Conspiracy Case trial which began in July 1929. In May 1930, he gave evidence in the trial which gave its judgement on 7 October 1930, sentencing "Bhagat Singh, Sukhdev and Rajguru to death by hanging".

It was not until the 1980s that Vohra made an attempt to explain why he did not divulge his colleagues details during the first arrest but disclosed all at the second arrest in 1929 after he had been informed that his mentor Sukhdev had already given away all their secrets. Vohra claimed in the letter that he felt let down and decided "I could not risk going down with people I no longer respected". Author Kuldip Nayar explained in his book The Martyr: Bhagat Singh - Experiments in Revolution (2000), that in the Lahore Conspiracy Case Trial of 1929-30, Vohra's testimony "was crucial in the death sentence handed out to Bhagat Singh, Sukhdev and Rajguru - his ex-comrades".

Two other significant approvers were Phonindra Nath Ghosh, whose testimony revolved mainly around the establishment of the Hindustan Socialist Party and Jai Gopal who focused on the murder of Saunders, while it was Vohra's testimony which concentrated on Bhagat Singh's activities. Bhagat Singh, Sukhdev and Rajguru subsequently became national heroes of the Indian independence movement.

== Later life ==
Following the trial and the request to the British government by his father and acceptance by the Viceroy, Vohra was sponsored by the Punjab government to study at the London School of Economics. After a Masters in political science, he gained a degree in journalism from London University, returned to Lahore in 1936, was appointed Assistant Information Officer in the Bureau of Public Information in 1942, and was the correspondent of the Civil and Military Gazette of Lahore until 1948. In 1958, he transferred to Washington, corresponded using the name "Hans R. Vohra" and became the Washington correspondent of The Times of India.

He remained a correspondent and never made it to editor. In 1965, as the Washington correspondent for the Times of India, his interview with Dean Rusk, the then United States Secretary of State, was published in the Department of State Bulletin.

He retired in 1969, but continued to work freelance. In 1970, he published a paper in the Bulletin of the Atomic Scientists titled "India's Nuclear Policy of Three Negatives", where he described India's attitude to the Treaty on the Non-Proliferation of Nuclear Weapons as "will not sign the nuclear non-proliferation treaty...will not make nuclear weapons...will not accept any nuclear guarantees".

== Death ==
He spent the last few years of life in social isolation. In 1981, before he died, he addressed a letter to Sukhdev's brother, explaining why he testified and expressed the wish to be forgotten:

Mine has been a most difficult life, full of risks, but so far touch wood, I have emerged virtually unscathed, at least physically. But the memory of the twenties accompanies me doggedly, teasingly and hauntingly….I hope by the time I die, I would have been fully forgotten, This is my only ambition.

He died on 13 September 1985 in Maryland. He was married and had three children and by them had six grandchildren.

== Selected publications ==
- "India's Nuclear Policy of Three Negatives", Bulletin of the Atomic Scientists, Vol. 26, Issue 4 (1970) pp. 25–27. doi:10.1080/00963402.1970.11457797
- "A Letter From Washington: Ministry of Science—U.S. Style", Bulletin of the Atomic Scientists, Vol. 27, Issue 1 (1971), pp. 29–33. doi:10.1080/00963402.1971.11455308

== See also ==
- Lahore Conspiracy Case
- Lahore Conspiracy Case trial
