= Ramnath =

Ramnath is an Indian name. Notable people with this name include:

Surname:

- Buno Ramnath, prominent logician, scholar and teacher of Nabadwip in the eighteenth century
- Jayashri Ramnath, Indian Carnatic vocalist, singer, and musician
- K. Ramnath (1912–1956), Indian cinematographer and director active in Tamil cinema
- Kala Ramnath, Indian classical violinist
- Premnath Ramnath (born 1962), Trinidadian cricketer
- Rajesh Ramnath, Indian film score and soundtrack composer
- Renuka Ramnath, Indian private equity fund manager
- Stephanie Syptak-Ramnath, American diplomat nominated to be the next US Ambassador to Peru

Given name:

- Ramnath Biswas (1894–1955), Indian revolutionary, soldier, travelogue writer
- Ramnath Dhakal (1962–2015), Nepalese politician belonging to the Communist Party of Nepal
- Ramnath Goenka (1904–1991), Indian newspaper publisher
- Ramnath Kare (born 1934), Indian industrialist, educationist and philanthropist from Goa
- Ramnath Kenny (1930–1985), Indian cricketer
- Ramnath Kovind (born 1945), Indian politician and lawyer, the 14th president of India (2017–2022)
- Ramnath Parkar (1946–1999), Indian cricketer
- Ramnath Paul (born 1942), Indian cricketer from Northern Punjab
- Ramnath Puri, Indian-American freedom fighter
- Ramnath Shastri (born 1914), pivotal in the revival and resurgence of the Dogri language
- Satish Ramnath Shetye (born 1950), Indian geophysicist, oceanographer and a former vice chancellor of the University of Goa

== See also ==
- Ramnath Goenka Excellence in Journalism Awards (RNG Awards)
- Ramnath Jeetah Trust operating as the University of Wolverhampton (Mauritius Branch Campus)
- Govind Ramnath Kare College of Law
- Bansilal Ramnath Agarwal Charitable Trust's Vishwakarama Institute Of information technology
- Ramnathi
