= Dharam Singh Hayatpur =

Dharam Singh Hayatpur (or Hiatpur) (1884 – 27 February 1926) was a prominent member of the Sikh political and religious group the Babbar Akali Movement in India.

== Biography ==
In 1926 a British imperial Sessions Court sentenced him to life imprisonment for his activities, but this sentence was increased on appeal by the High Court and he was hanged. Dharam Singh Hayatpur and five other men's struggle influenced Bhagat Singh in writing his article, "Blood Sprinkled on the Day of Holi Babbar Akalis on the Crucifix" which shows admiration for the men and highlights their cause.
