= John P. Saunders =

British colonial police officer (1907-1928)

John Poyntz Saunders
- Born: 24 July 1907; Peterborough, Cambridgeshire, United Kingdom
- Died: 17 December 1928 (aged 21); Lahore, Punjab Province, British India
- Cause of death: gunshot wound
- Occupation: Police officer

John Poyntz Saunders (24 July 1907 – 17 December 1928) was a British colonial police officer who was assassinated by Indian revolutionaries Bhagat Singh and Shivaram Rajguru, who mistook Saunders for their intended target, James Alexander Scott.

== Early life and career ==
John Poyntz Saunders was born on 24 July 1907. He attended The King's (The Cathedral) School in Peterborough as a King's Scholar.

John P. Saunders joined the Indian Police Service on 8 April 1927 as an assistant superintendent in Punjab Province, British India (now Punjab Province, Pakistan).

== Assassination ==
Killing of John Saunders
- Date: 17 December 1928 (98 years ago)
- Location: Lahore, British India (now Pakistan); 31.573513°N 74.303974°E
- Deaths: 2 (John Saunders and Chanan Singh)

In December 1928, 21-year-old John P. Saunders, who was still on probation, was serving as an assistant superintendent of police in the city of Lahore. At around 4pm on 17 December 1928, Saunders left the District Police Headquarters with Head Constable Chanan Singh, and headed for his motorbike. As Saunders left the police station, he was fired upon by a group of conspirators from the Hindustan Socialist Republican Association (HSRA), which included Bhagat Singh, Shivaram Rajguru, Chandrashekhar Azad, Sukhdev Thapar and Jai Gopal. Shivaram Rajguru first shot Saunders with a 7.63mm Mauser pistol, and Bhagat Singh then fired several shots from a .32 Colt Automatic pistol into Saunders as he lay on the ground. They were subsequently pursued by Head Constable Chanan Singh, who was then also shot dead. The assailants fled the scene via Court Street and through what was then the D.A.V. College (now Government Islamia College, Civil Lines).

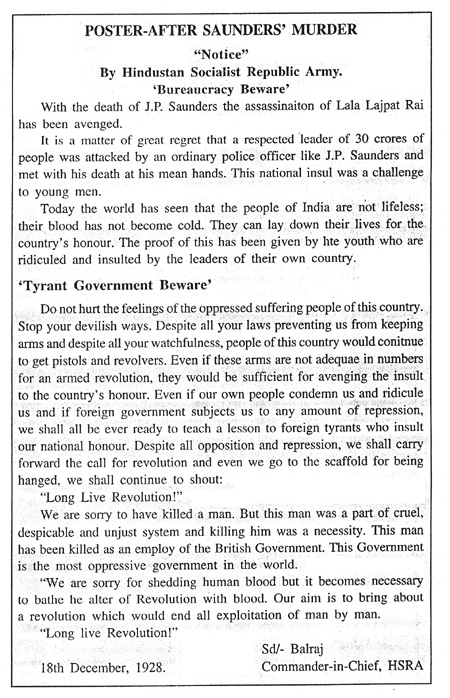
The content of posters stuck across Lahore in the aftermath of Saunders' killing

The killing of Saunders was the result of mistaken identity, as his assassins had actually intended to kill police superintendent James Alexander Scott. One of the conspirators, Jai Gopal, had followed Scott's movements for several days but had mistaken Saunders for Scott when he gave the signal to the assassins. The conspirators intended to kill Scott in revenge for the death of Lala Lajpat Rai, who had died less than a month after leading a demonstration against the British government's Simon Commission, which was attacked by a police baton charge under Scott's orders. The HSRA had prepared posters claiming responsibility for Scott's death, which were altered after the assassination to describe the killing of Saunders as a retaliatory act against the British authorities.

=== Aftermath ===
The two assailants who shot Saunders were not named in the First Information Report, as they had not been identified and had escaped the scene of the crime. Bhagat Singh was able to escape Lahore and travelled by train to Calcutta, disguised as a wealthy Anglo-Indian. Singh and other members of the HSRA would later be involved in the Delhi Assembly Bombing, for which they were arrested on 8 April 1929.

Bhagat Singh was brought to Lahore to face trial for the murder of Saunders on 10 July 1929. On 1 May 1930, the Viceroy of India, Lord Irwin, issued an ordnance establishing a Special Tribunal for the Lahore Conspiracy Case, which began on 5 May. On 7 October, Bhagat Singh, Shivaram Rajguru and Sukhdev Thapar were sentenced to death. Singh appealed to the Privy Council, which dismissed his appeal on 11 February 1931, and three days later the Viceroy Lord Irwin rejected an appeal for mercy from Congress President Madan Mohan Malviya. On 23 March, The Punjab High Court dismissed appeals against the Privy Council and Tribunal Court, and the conspirators were executed that evening. Much of the prosecution case was built upon the testimony of Jai Gopal, who gave evidence against his fellow conspirators in exchange for a pardon.

== Memorials ==
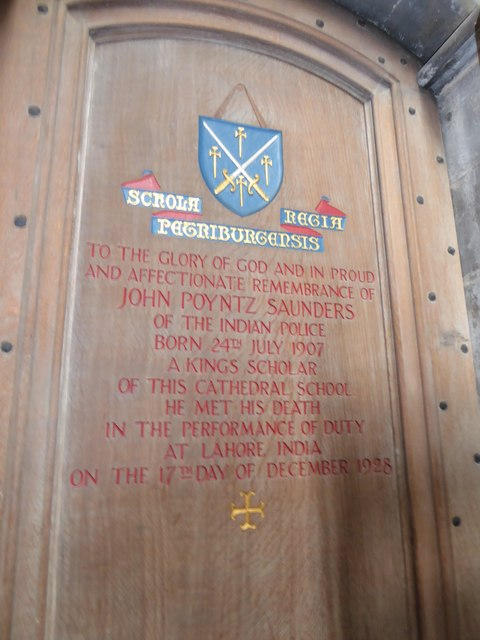
Memorial dedicated to John Poyntz Saunders in Peterborough Cathedral

A plaque commemorating John Poyntz Saunders is located within St. Spirite's Chapel of Peterborough Cathedral.
