= Kamal Nath Tewari =

Indian politician

Kamal Nath Tewari https://drive.google.com/drive/folders/1y2muK9ql4eG1pII4FgdS-SKNqYXPiwsk
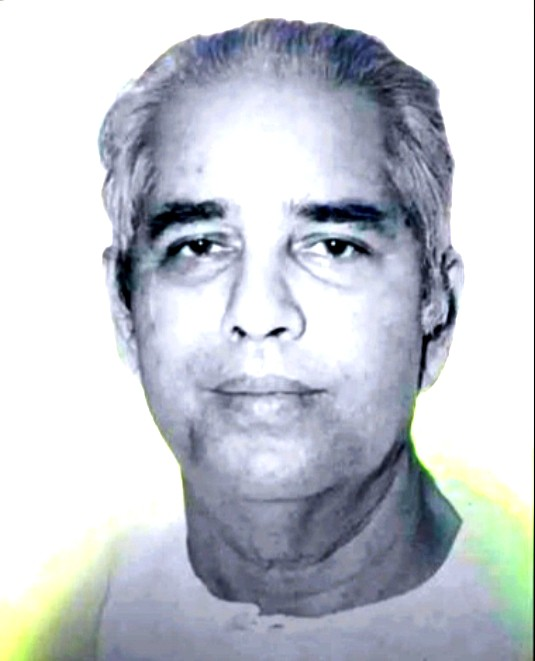

Member of Parliament, Lok Sabha
- In office 1962-1974
- Succeeded by: Fazlur Rahman
- Constituency: Bettiah, Bihar

Personal details
- Born: 29 March 1907 Sareya Pipra, East Champaran
- Died: 17 January 1974 (aged 66) Delhi
- Party: Indian National Congress
- Spouse: Kusum Devi
- Children: Shambhu Nath Tewari Siddhi Nath Tewari
- Parent: Suraj Nath Tewari Bhagyawanti Devi

Kamal Nath Tewari (29 March 1907 – 17 January 1974) was an Indian politician. He was elected to the Lok Sabha, the lower house of the Parliament of India from Bettiah, Bihar as a member of the Indian National Congress. He was a freedom fighter, compatriot of Bhagat Singh, co accused in Lahore Conspiracy Case and was imprisoned by the British from 1930 to 1941 and again from 1942-46.
