= Indian Imperial Police =

Uniform system of police administration in British India

The Indian Imperial Police (officially known as the Imperial Police or I.P.) was part of the uniform system of police administration in British Raj, as established by Government of India Act 1858 and Police Act 1861. It was motivated by the danger experienced by the British during the 1857 Revolution.

In 1920, the Imperial Indian police had 310,000 police in their contingent. Its members policed more than 300 million people from the Raj (now India, Pakistan, Bangladesh and Burma).

In 1948, a year after India's independence, the Imperial Police Service was replaced by the Indian Police Service, which had been constituted as part of the All-India Services by the Constitution.

== History ==
The sanctioned strength of the I.P. officers in British India was 743 in 1924 of whom 77 (10%) were Indians. In 1946, the sanctioned strength was 721 of whom 221 (30%) were Indians.

It comprised two branches, the Superior Police Services, from which the Indian (Imperial) Police would later be formed, and the Subordinate Police Service. Until 1893, appointments to the senior grades (i.e., Assistant District Superintendent and above) were mainly from European officers of the Indian Army.

The highest rank in the service was the Inspector General for each province. The rank of Inspector General was equated and ranked with Brigadier and similar ranks in the Indian Armed Forces, as per Central Warrant of Precedence in 1937. (Note: The rank of IGP is ranked and equated with the rank of Brigadier / equivalent rank of the Indian Armed Forces as per Warrant of Precedence – 1937, according to the Ministry of Home Affairs' directions contained in Letter No 12/11/99-Pub II dated 26 Dec 1966. This Warrant of Precedence is compiled from a joint consideration of the existing Central Warrant of Precedence (which is till the rank of Major General) and Warrant of Precedence – 1937, according to the Ministry of Home Affairs' directions contained in Letter No 12/11/99-Pub II dated 26 Dec 1966, the validity of which has been confirmed by Letter No 12/1/2007-Public dated 14 Aug 2007. The MHA has confirmed in 2007 that the Old Warrant of Precedence shall be taken as a guide to determine ranks below the ones mentioned in the current WoP.) Subordinate to the Inspector General, the ranks were composed of District Superintendents and Assistant District Superintendents, most of whom were appointed, from 1893, by examination for the Indian Civil Service tests in the UK. The Subordinate Police Service consisted of Inspectors, Sub-Inspectors, Head Constables (or Sergeant in the City forces and cantonments) and Constables, consisting mainly of Indians except for the higher ranks.

By the 1930s, the Indian Police exercised "unprecedented degree of authority within the colonial administration". The Indian Imperial Police was also the primary law enforcement in Burma, governed as a province of India, until 1937.

Before WWII, the Indian Police routinely served as a source of cadre for MI5.

== Ranks of the Imperial (India) Police ==
- Superior Services:
  - Inspector General of Police (Head of the state police)
  - Deputy Inspector General of Police (Head of Range Police) or Commissioner of Four cities (Madras, Bombay, Calcutta and Rangoon)
  - Superintendent of Police (Head of District Police)
  - Assistant Superintendent of Police (Head of sub divisional Police, specially main sub division of a district)
- Subordinate services:
  - Deputy Superintendent of Police (Head of sub divisional Police).
  - Inspector of Police (Head of circle Police)
  - Sub Inspector of Police (Head of Police station)
  - Sergeant
  - Head constable
  - Naik
  - Constable

== Orwell ==
George Orwell, with his real name Eric Blair, served in the Indian Imperial Police, in Burma, from 27 November 1922 to 12 July 1927, formally resigning while on leave in England (effective 1 January 1928) having attained the rank of Assistant District Superintendent at District Headquarters, first in Insein, and later at Moulmein. He wrote of how having been in contact with, in his own words, "the dirty work of Empire at close quarters" had affected his personal, political and social opinions. Some of his works referring to his experiences include "A Hanging" (1931), set in the notorious Insein Prison, and his novel Burmese Days (1934). Likewise, although he wrote that, "I loved Burma and the Burman and have no regrets that I spent the best years of my life in the Burma police.", in "Shooting an Elephant" (1936), his character stated that "In Moulmein in Lower Burma, I was hated by large numbers of people–- the only time in my life that I have been important enough for this to happen to me."

== Notable members ==
- Charles Tegart
- George Orwell
- Percival Griffiths
- James Alexander Scott
- John P. Saunders
- T. Ramachandra Rao
- Bhola Nath Mullik
- Panchanan Ghoshal
- Qazi Azizul Haque
- Hem Chandra Bose

== Bibliography ==
- Chandavarkar, Rajnarayan (1998) Imperial Power and Popular Politics: Class, Resistance and the State in India, 1850-1950. Cambridge University Press.
