= Govind Ramnath Kare College of Law =

Law college in Margao, Goa, India

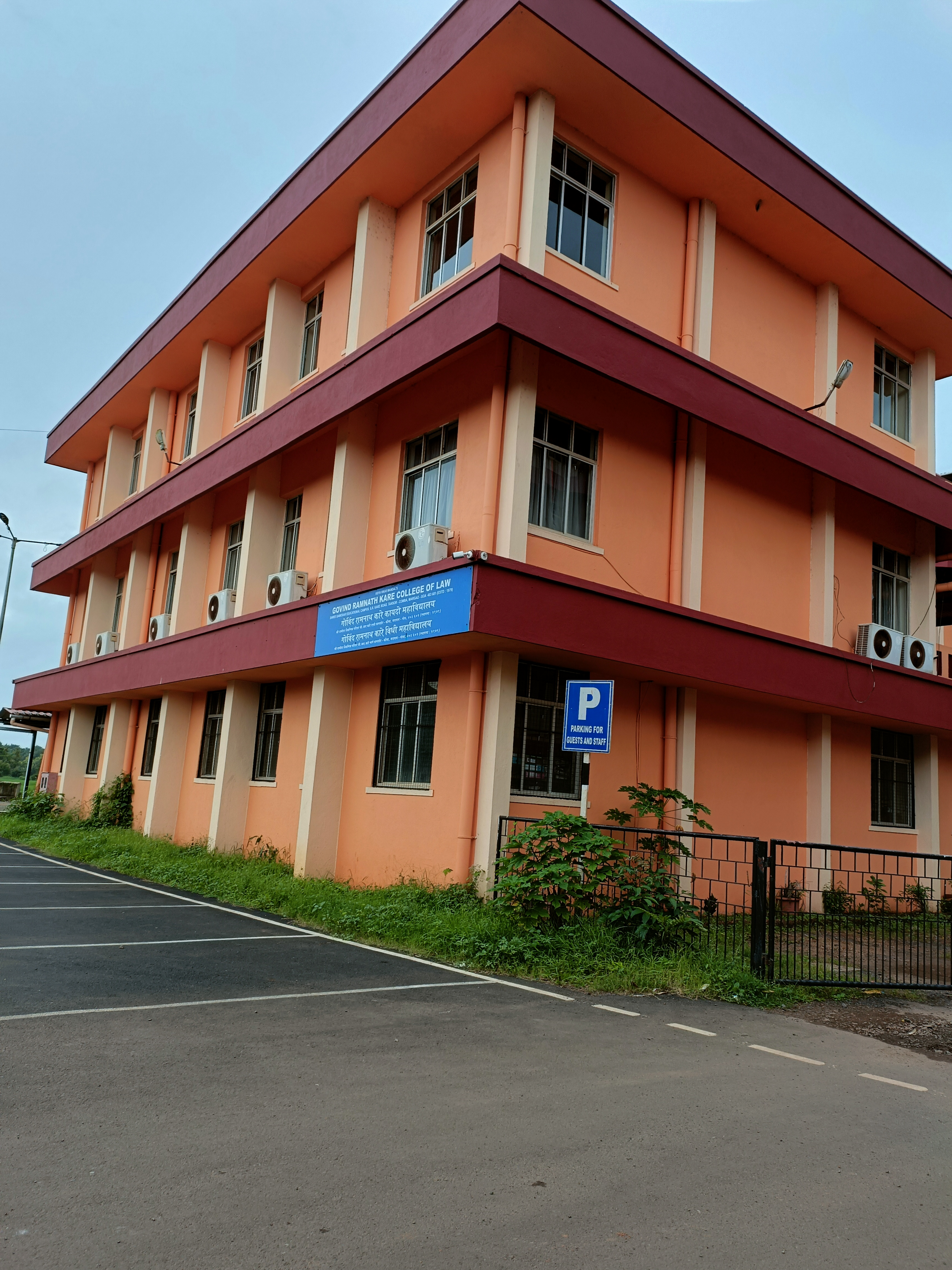
- Kare Law College in 2022
- Motto: "Excellence always in legal education"
- Type: Private law college
- Established: 1979
- Academic affiliations: Goa University
- Principal: Saba V. M. Da Silva
- Location: P.B. No.777, G.R. Kare Road, Tansor, Comba, Margao, Goa, India; 15.2743°N 73.9514°E
- Website: www.grkarelaw.edu.in

The Govind Ramnath Kare College of Law, popularly known as the G.R. Kare College of Law, and also as the Kare Law College, is a law college located at Comba in Margao, Goa.

Kare College is the only centre of legal education in the district of South Goa. It was established by the "Vidya Vikas Mandal" in 1979. The college is managed by the "Vidya Vikas Mandal" and is affiliated to the Goa University. It has been recognised by the University Grants Commission and Bar Council of India. Kare College has been accredited with 'B' grade by the National Assessment and Accreditation Council. The current edifice of the institution was inaugurated on 21 September 2001 by the then Union Minister of Law and Justice, Arun Jaitley.

== Name ==
The college is named for Govind Ramnath Kare — father of the Goan industrialist, educationist, and philanthropist Ramnath Govind Kare — whose family made a munificent donation to the Vidya Vikas Mandal in 1979 to establish the college.

== Courses ==
The college offers the following courses:

- Bachelor of Arts and Bachelor of Laws (B.A., LL.B.) - Five years' course
- LL.B degree (Three years' course)
- LL.M. degree (Two years' course)
- Ph.D

== Facilities ==
Kare College has a well equipped library, an air conditioned auditorium, computer lab, smart class and a moot court hall. The Moot Court Hall of the institution was inaugurated at the hands of the then Chief Justice of the Bombay High Court, Justice Mohit Shantilal Shah. On 15 December 2014, a Library App, designed by Rupesh Shirodkar, was also launched for the library of Kare College. Associate Professor Dr. Saba V. M. Da Silva is the Principal of the institution. The institution has faculty including PhD holders and expert part-time lecturers.

== Academic, extra & co-curricular activities ==
Four students of the Kare Law College authored a book entitled "Traffic Yoga", a handbook for road traffic and road safety measures.

In 2014, Kare College started an initiative called "GRK Talks". These talks are conducted every month, where the orators speak on socio-legal aspects. Those who have delivered the "GRK Talks", include former Union Minister of State for Law and Justice (Independent Charge) Ramakant Khalap, renowned Mumbai-based lawyer Haresh Jagtiani, entrepreneur Dr. Nandini Vaidyanathan, leading valuer Mahendra Caculo, Goa's Advocate General Atmaram Nadkarni, entrepreneur and author Datta Naik, then Chief Justice of the Bombay High Court Justice Mohit Shantilal Shah etc.

Inauguration of "Juris Open" Law Festival on 3 February 2017 by industrialist Audhut Timblo.

The college also has a classroom lecture series, called "GRK Master Class". Through the medium of the "GRK Master Class", lawyers and experts are invited to deliver a lecture on a topic related to the students' syllabi. Those who have addressed the students through this classroom lecture series include Advocate Rajeev Gomes and the former Additional Solicitor General of India M. S. Usgaonkar.

In 2016, Gautami Raiker, a student of the Kare College of Law, secured the second runners-up position in the All India Startup Competition in the domain of law organized by Gujarat National Law University, Gandhinagar.

The college also excels in sports and its students have won several medals at inter-college and University level. Kare College has also conducted NAPESS (National level event of sports and physical education) conference. In 2015, the institution organised "Fortitude", an all Goa inter-collegiate tennis ball cricket tournament.

Kare College of Law has its National Service Scheme (NSS) unit and the unit conducts many activities such as blood-donation camps. The college has also established Legal Aid Cells in various parts of the State to provide legal assistance to public.

In addition, the college has certain clubs like the Consumer Law Club.

== Internship & Entrepreneurship Cell ==
In January 2015, Kare Law College inaugurated an Internship Cell and an Entrepreneurship Cell in association with Centre for Incubation and Business Acceleration (CIBA). Through CIBA, the Entrepreneurship Cell would help students understand various benefits of entrepreneurship and think of it as a viable and lucrative career option and also encourage independent and entrepreneurial talent. Internship Cell would provide internship opportunities in corporate houses, companies, NGOs, orphanages, public consumer forums, etc.

== Jan Suvidha Kendra ==
In July, 2015, a "Jan Suvidha Kendra" (Citizens' Facilitation Centre) was inaugurated at the South Goa District Collectorate (Matanhy Saldanha Administrative Complex) located in Fatorda, Margao in association with the Kare College of Law. The centre was inaugurated at the hands of Francis Dsouza, the Deputy Chief Minister of Goa. The centre will provide assistance to the public in drafting and filling of routine application for various services like obtaining Residence Certificate, Income Certificate, Caste Certificate, Mutation, Land Conversion, Partition, issues relating to the Land Revenue Code (L.R.C.) etc. Students of the Kare Law College provide their services in the centre, free of cost.

A Memorandum of Understanding (MoU) between the South Goa district Collectorate and the Kare Law College was signed in 2017 for establishing the "Jan Suvidha Kendra" on a permanent basis.

== MOUs signed ==
Kare College of Law in January 2018 signed a Memorandum of Understanding (MoU) with the University of Lisbon, Portugal. The MoU is for five years and the college has established a Centre for Lusophone Culture and Legal Studies in Margao under the agreement. An agreement has also been signed between Kare College of Law and the Lusophone Society of Goa.

In December 2018, Kare College signed a Memorandum of Understanding (MoU) with NGO 'Sangath', to work in the field of inclusivity.

In February 2020, during the visit of the Portuguese President Marcelo Rebelo de Sousa, a Memorandum of Understanding (MoU) was signed between the Kare College of Law and the University of Coimbra, Portugal

== Controversies ==
In July 2013, the canteen serving the college was shut down by the Directorate of Food and Drugs, Government of Goa citing unhealthy cooking facilities.

In 2016, the Goa University imposed a penalty on the college, thereby permitting to admit only 38 students in the LL.B Course, as the college had admitted 82 students in 2015, by bypassing the threshold of 60 admissions. However, the university later permitted the college to admit 60 students, after the institution admitted its mistake.

In 2023, the Principal of the college was accused of favouritism in the admission process to benefit his son. The Goa University appointed a committee to inquire into the matter.

== Alumni ==
Alumni of the Kare College of Law can be seen in many fields including administration and judiciary. Notable alumni of the college include:

- Justice Anuja Prabhudessai, Judge at the Bombay High Court and the first lady from Goa to be elevated to the High Court.
- Justice Nutan D. Sardessai, Judge at the Bombay High Court.
- Atmaram Nadkarni, Additional Solicitor General of India and former Advocate General of Goa.
- Desmond D'Costa, incumbent President of the College Tribunal, Goa and former Principal District & Sessions Judge, South Goa.
- Advocate Rajiv Gomes, the former President of the South Goa Advocates' Association.
- Anwesha Singbal, Sahitya Akademi Yuva Puraskar awardee for the year 2016 in Konkani language category.
- Adv. Carlos Alvares Ferreira, Member of the Goa Legislative Assembly
