= Banga, Pakistan =

Banga بنگا
- Village
- Location within Punjab, Pakistan Location within Pakistan
- Coordinates: 31.401098°N 73.296533°E
- Country: Pakistan
- Province: Punjab
- District: Faisalabad
- Elevation: 181 m (594 ft)
- Time zone: UTC+5 (PST)

Banga (Punjabi and Urdu: بانگا) is a village of Faisalabad District (previously Lyallpur) in the Punjab province of Pakistan. It is located at 31°24'0N 73°18'0E at an altitude of 181 metres (597 feet). Banga Chak is 20 km from Faisalabad and the same distance from Jaranwala off Faisalabad-Jaranwala Road. It is about 133 km from the provincial capital Lahore. Banga is the birthplace of freedom fighter Bhagat Singh.

== Attractions ==
Bhagat Singh was born in the village in 1907. The Government of Pakistan has declared it a national heritage site and the Government of Indian Punjab had also offered help to set up a memorial.

An annual memorial fair is held in the village on 23 March, the anniversary of Singh's death.

== Education ==
There are two public high schools, one each for boys and girls, and many private schools as well.
