= James Alexander Scott =

Member of the Indian Police Force

James Alexander Scott CIE OBE IP
- Born: 2 December 1895; Currie, Midlothian, Scotland
- Died: 20 January 1983 (aged 87)
- Military career
- Branch: British Indian Army; Indian Imperial Police
- Unit: 93rd Burma Infantry
- Awards: Indian Police Medal; King's Police Medal

James Alexander Scott CIE OBE (2 December 1895 – 20 January 1983), was a British member of the Indian Police Force from 1915 to 1947.

In 1915 Scott joined the Indian Police Force. He then became attached to the 93rd Burma Infantry and completed three years of service with the Indian Army. Subsequently he was posted to the provinces of Punjab and Delhi. In October 1928, he was superintendent of police in Lahore, when the Simon Commission visited. There, he ordered the dispersal of protesters by the charging with batons, resulting in severe injuries to the Indian revolutionary Lala Lajpat Rai. Rai's death a fortnight later led to Scott becoming the target of an assassination by members of the Hindustan Socialist Republican Army, and the subsequent Lahore Conspiracy Case.

Documents related to Scott, including his thoughts penciled in the margins of a copy of Alfred Draper's book titled Amritsar: The Massacre that Ended the Raj (1981), are kept in the British Library.

== Early life and career ==
James Scott was born on 2 December 1895, at Currie, Midlothian, Scotland. He attended George Heriot's School in Edinburgh. In 1915 he joined the Indian Police Force. He became attached to the 93rd Burma Infantry and completed three years of service with the Indian Army, and in 1918 was mentioned in Despatches. Subsequently he was posted to the provinces of Punjab and Delhi.

== Simon Commission and Lahore Conspiracy Case ==
On 30 October 1928, when the Simon Commission arrived at Lahore, Scott was the superintendent of police in Lahore, where he ordered the dispersal of a peaceful protest by the charging with batons. One result was severe injuries to the Indian revolutionary Lala Lajpat Rai. As a result of Rai's death just over two weeks later, Scott became the target of an assassination, attempted on 17 December 1928. That day, Scott's assistant J. P. Saunders, was mistaken for Scott, and fatally shot by Shivaram Rajguru and Bhagat Singh of the Hindustan Socialist Republican Army. Prior to the shooting, pink posters had already been prepared quoting "Scott is dead". The subsequent Lahore Conspiracy Case led to the conversion of Hans Raj Vohra and others as approvers, and the hanging of Singh, Rajguru, and Sukhdev Thapar.

== Awards and honours ==
Scott's awards and honours include the CIE, OBE, the Indian Police Medal, and the King's Police Medal.

== Personal and family ==
Scott was married to Elizabeth Smith, and they had two sons, Alastair and Malcolm. He died on 20 January 1983, at the age of 88 years, and was buried at Colinton Kirk Churchyard. Two years before his death, Scott's son Alastair gifted Scott Alfred Draper's book titled Amritsar: The Massacre that Ended the Raj (1981). Part of the collection of documents on Scott held at the British Library, it reveals Scott's handwritten thoughts in the margins and parts he highlighted and underlined, including his agreement with those that believed that Reginald Dyer's action at Jallianwalla Bagh resulted in peace in the Punjab.
