= Lahore Conspiracy Case =

Lahore Conspiracy Case may refer to:

- Lahore Conspiracy Case trial (26 April – 13 September, 1915), in the aftermath of the Ghadar conspiracy
- Lahore Conspiracy Case (10 July, 1929 – 7 October, 1930) outlined in Bhagat Singh § Hunger strike and Lahore conspiracy case
