= Bhagat Singh =

Indian revolutionary (1907–1931)

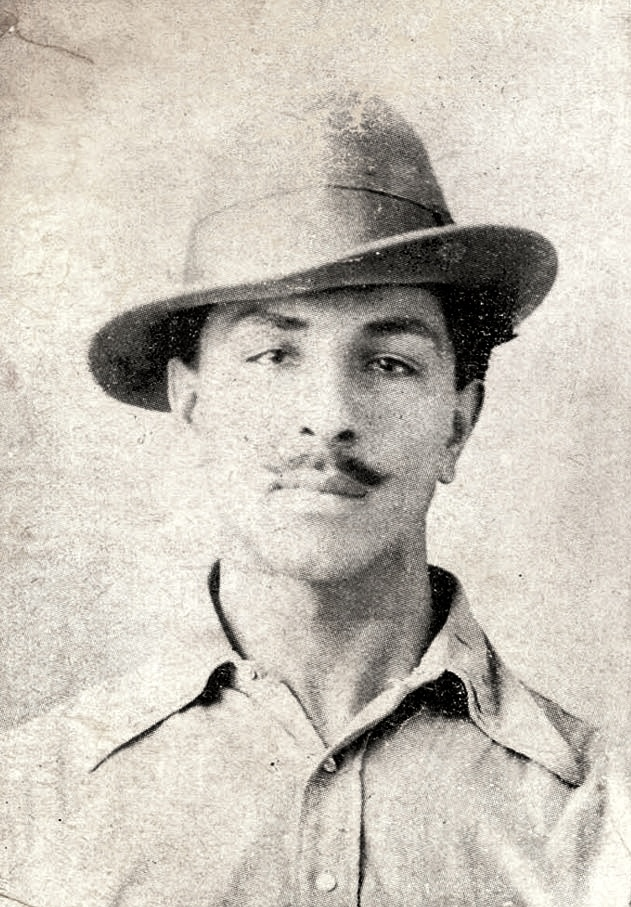
- Singh in 1929
- Born: 27 September 1907 (Note: Whereas most sources state 27 September 1907 to be Bhagat Singh's birth date, some mention 28 September 1907. Some others mention both 27 and 28 September in different contexts; One scholar has suggested that 27 September was widely celebrated in India as Bhagat Singh's birthday until the turn of the 21st century when Google's celebration of its founding on that day began to critically affect Indian media's coverage of the birthday.); Banga, Punjab, British Raj (Present-day Punjab, Pakistan)
- Died: 23 March 1931 (aged 23); Lahore Central Jail, Punjab, British Raj (Present-day Kot Lakhpat Jail, Lahore, Punjab, Pakistan)
- Cause of death: Execution by hanging
- Monuments: Hussainiwala National Martyrs Memorial
- Other name: "Shaheed-e-Azam"
- Organization(s): Naujawan Bharat Sabha; Hindustan Socialist Republican Association
- Notable work: Why I Am an Atheist
- Movement: Indian independence movement
- Criminal charges: Murder of John P. Saunders and Channan Singh
- Criminal penalty: Death
- Criminal status: Executed

Bhagat Singh (Note: Punjabi: ਭਗਤ ਸਿੰਘ, romanized: Bhagat Siṅgh; IPA: [pə˩.ɡət̪ sɪŋ˥]) (27 September 1907 – 23 March 1931) was an Indian anti-colonial revolutionary who participated in the mistaken murder of a junior British police officer in December 1928 in what was intended to be retaliation for the death of an Indian nationalist. He later took part in a largely symbolic bombing of the Central Legislative Assembly in Delhi and a hunger strike in jail, which—on the back of sympathetic coverage in Indian-owned newspapers—turned him into a household name in the Punjab region, and, after his execution at age 23, a martyr and folk hero in Northern India. Borrowing ideas from Bolshevism and anarchism, the charismatic Bhagat Singh electrified a growing militancy in India in the 1930s and prompted urgent introspection within the Indian National Congress's nonviolent, and eventually successful, campaign for India's independence.

In December 1928, Bhagat Singh and an associate, Shivaram Rajguru, both members of a small revolutionary group, the Hindustan Socialist Republican Association (also Army, or HSRA), shot dead a 21-year-old British police officer, John P. Saunders, in Lahore, Punjab, in what is today Pakistan, mistaking Saunders, who was still on probation, for the British senior police superintendent, James Scott, whom they had intended to assassinate. They held Scott responsible for the death of a popular Indian nationalist leader Lala Lajpat Rai for having ordered a lathi (baton) charge in which Rai was injured and two weeks thereafter died of a heart attack. As Saunders exited a police station on a motorcycle, he was felled by a single bullet fired from across the street by Rajguru, a marksman. As he lay injured, he was shot at close range several times by Singh, the postmortem report showing eight bullet wounds. Another associate of Singh, Chandra Shekhar Azad, shot dead an Indian police head constable, Channan Singh, who attempted to give chase as Singh and Rajguru fled.

After having escaped, Bhagat Singh and his associates used pseudonyms to publicly announce avenging Lajpat Rai's death, putting up prepared posters that they had altered to show John Saunders as their intended target instead of James Scott. Singh was thereafter on the run for many months, and no convictions resulted at the time. Surfacing again in April 1929, he and another associate, Batukeshwar Dutt, set off two low-intensity homemade bombs among some unoccupied benches of the Central Legislative Assembly in Delhi. They showered leaflets from the gallery on the legislators below, shouted slogans, and allowed the authorities to arrest them. The arrest, and the resulting publicity, brought to light Singh's complicity in the John Saunders case. Awaiting trial, Singh gained public sympathy after he joined fellow defendant Jatin Das in a hunger strike, demanding better prison conditions for Indian prisoners, the strike ending in Das's death from starvation in September 1929.

Bhagat Singh was convicted of the murder of John Saunders and Channan Singh, and hanged in March 1931, aged 23. He became a popular folk hero after his death. Jawaharlal Nehru wrote about him: "Bhagat Singh did not become popular because of his act of terrorism but because he seemed to vindicate, for the moment, the honour of Lala Lajpat Rai, and through him of the nation. He became a symbol; the act was forgotten, the symbol remained, and within a few months each town and village of the Punjab, and to a lesser extent in the rest of northern India, resounded with his name." In still later years, Singh, an atheist and socialist in adulthood, won admirers in India from among a political spectrum that included both communists and right-wing Hindu nationalists. Although many of Singh's associates, as well as many Indian anti-colonial revolutionaries, were also involved in daring acts and were either executed or died violent deaths, few came to be lionised in popular art and literature as did Singh, who is sometimes referred to as the Shaheed-e-Azam ("Great martyr" in Urdu and Punjabi).

== Early life ==
Bhagat Singh was born into a Punjabi Jat Sikh family on 27 September 1907, in the village of Banga, in the Lyallpur district of the Punjab, in what was then British India and is today Pakistan; he was the second of seven children—four sons and three daughters—born to Vidyavati and her husband, Kishan Singh Sandhu. Bhagat Singh's father and his uncle Ajit Singh, were active in progressive politics, taking part in the agitation around the Canal Colonisation Bill in 1907, and later, the Ghadar Movement of 1914–1915.

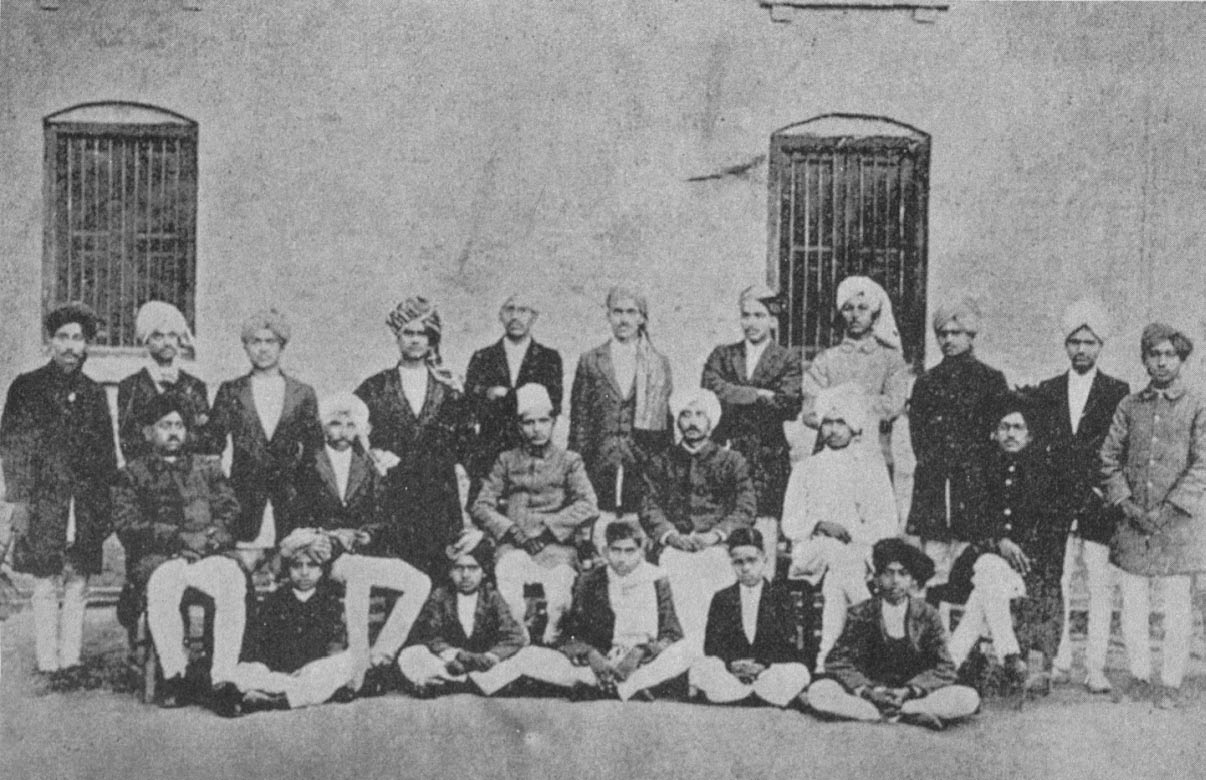
Photo of Singh (back row, fourth from right) in the Lahore College Drama Club (1924)

After being sent to the village school in Banga for a few years, Bhagat Singh was enrolled in the Dayanand Anglo-Vedic School in Lahore. In 1923, he joined the National College in Lahore, founded two years earlier by Lala Lajpat Rai in response to Mahatma Gandhi's non-cooperation movement, which urged Indian students to shun schools and colleges subsidised by the British Indian government.

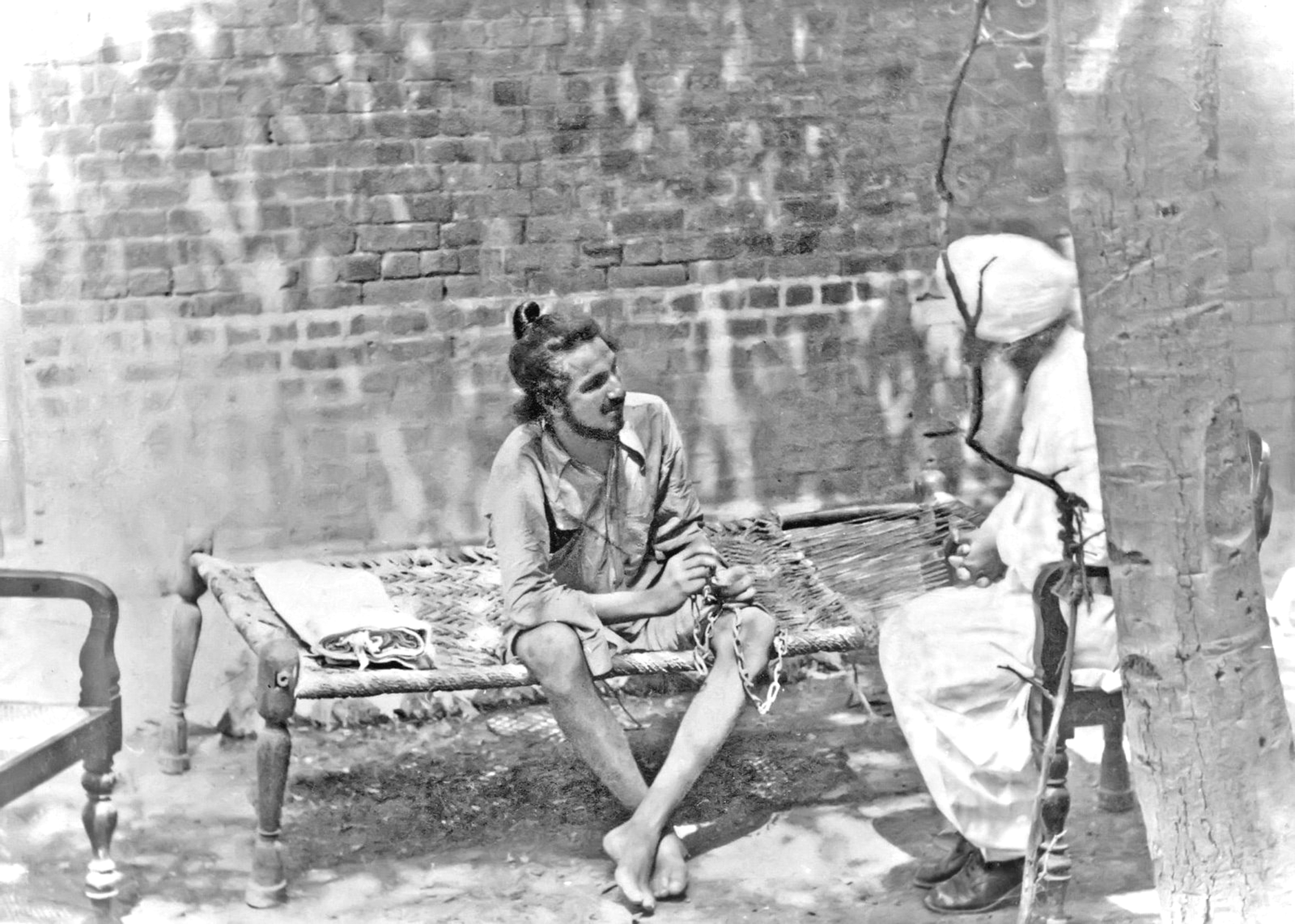
Singh's photo during his first arrest

Police became concerned with Singh's influence on the youth and arrested him in May 1927 on the pretext that he had been involved in a bombing that had taken place in Lahore in October 1926. He was released on a surety of Rs. 60,000 five weeks after his arrest. He wrote for, and edited, Urdu and Punjabi newspapers, published in Amritsar and also contributed to low-priced pamphlets published by the Naujawan Bharat Sabha that excoriated the British. He also wrote for Kirti, the journal of the Kirti Kisan Party ("Workers and Peasants Party") and briefly for the Veer Arjun newspaper, published in Delhi. (Note: He was secretary of the Kirti Kisan Party when it organised an all-India meeting of revolutionaries in September 1928 and he later became its leader.) He often used pseudonyms, including names such as Balwant, Ranjit and Vidhrohi; In one instance in 1924 writing an article under the name 'Balwant' in praise of ideologue Vinayak Damodar Savarkar, calling him a 'braveheart' and 'fierce insurgent'.

== Revolutionary activities ==
=== Killing of John Saunders ===
In 1928, the British government set up the Simon Commission to report on the political situation in India. Some Indian political parties boycotted the Commission because there were no Indians in its membership, (Note: Opposition in India to the Simon Commission was not universal. For example, the Central Sikh League, some Hindu politicians, and some members of the Muslim League agreed to co-operate) and there were protests across the country. When the Commission visited Lahore on 30 October 1928, Lala Lajpat Rai led a march in protest against it. Police attempts to disperse the large crowd resulted in violence. The superintendent of police, James A. Scott, ordered the police to lathi charge (use batons against) the protesters and personally assaulted Rai, who was injured. Rai died of a heart attack on 17 November 1928. Doctors thought that his death might have been hastened by the injuries he had received. When the matter was raised in the Parliament of the United Kingdom, the British Government denied any role in Rai's death.

Singh was a prominent member of the Hindustan Republican Association (HRA) and was probably responsible, in large part, for its change of name to Hindustan Socialist Republican Association (HSRA) in 1928. The HSRA vowed to avenge Rai's death. Singh conspired with revolutionaries like Shivaram Rajguru, Sukhdev Thapar, and Chandrashekhar Azad to kill Scott. However, in a case of mistaken identity, the plotters shot John P. Saunders, an Assistant Superintendent of Police, as he was leaving the District Police Headquarters in Lahore on 17 December 1928.

Contemporary reaction to the killing differs substantially from the adulation that later surfaced. The Naujawan Bharat Sabha, which had organised the Lahore protest march along with the HSRA, found that attendance at its subsequent public meetings dropped sharply. Politicians, activists, and newspapers, including The People, which Rai had founded in 1925, stressed that non-cooperation was preferable to violence. The murder was condemned as a retrograde action by Mahatma Gandhi, the Congress leader, but Jawaharlal Nehru later expressed his opinion in these words:

Bhagat Singh did not become popular because of his act of terrorism but because he seemed to vindicate, for the moment, the honour of Lala Lajpat Rai, and through him of the nation. He became a symbol, the act was forgotten, the symbol remained, and within a few months each town and village of the Punjab, and to a lesser extent in the rest of northern India, resounded with his name. Innumerable songs grew about him and the popularity that the man achieved was something amazing.

=== Killing of Channan Singh ===
After killing Saunders, the group escaped through the D.A.V. College entrance, across the road from the District Police Headquarters. Chanan Singh, a Head Constable who was chasing them, was shot dead by Chandrashekhar Azad. They then fled on bicycles to pre-arranged safe houses. The police launched a massive search operation to catch them, blocking all entrances and exits to and from the city; the Criminal Investigation Department (CID) kept a watch on all young men leaving Lahore. The fugitives hid for the next two days. On 19 December 1928, Sukhdev called on Durgawati Devi, sometimes known as Durga Bhabhi, wife of another HSRA member, Bhagwati Charan Vohra, for help, which she agreed to provide. They decided to catch the train departing from Lahore to Bathinda en route to Howrah (Calcutta) early the next morning.

=== Escape from Lahore ===
Bhagat Singh and Rajguru, both carrying loaded revolvers, left the house early the next day. Dressed in Western attire (Bhagat Singh cut his hair, shaved his beard and wore a hat over cropped hair), and carrying Devi's sleeping child, Singh and Devi passed as a young couple, while Rajguru carried their luggage as their servant. At the station, Singh managed to conceal his identity while buying tickets, and the three boarded the train heading to Cawnpore (now Kanpur). There they boarded a train for Lucknow since the CID at Howrah railway station usually scrutinised passengers on the direct train from Lahore. At Lucknow, Rajguru left separately for Benares while Singh, Devi and the infant went to Howrah, with all except Singh returning to Lahore a few days later.

=== Delhi Assembly bombing and arrest ===
For some time, Bhagat Singh had been exploiting the power of drama as a means to inspire the revolt against the British, purchasing a magic lantern to show slides that enlivened his talks about revolutionaries such as Ram Prasad Bismil who had died as a result of the Kakori conspiracy. In 1929, he proposed a dramatic act to the HSRA intended to gain massive publicity for their aims. Influenced by Auguste Vaillant, a French anarchist who had bombed the Chamber of Deputies in Paris, Singh's plan was to explode a bomb inside the Central Legislative Assembly in the Council House. The nominal intention was to protest against the Public Safety Bill, and the Trade Dispute Act, which had been rejected by the Assembly but were being enacted by the Viceroy using his special powers; the actual intention was for the perpetrators to allow themselves to be arrested so that they could use court appearances as a stage to publicise their cause.

The HSRA leadership was initially opposed to Bhagat's participation in the bombing because they were certain that his prior involvement in the Saunders shooting meant that his arrest would ultimately result in his execution. However, they eventually decided that he was their most suitable candidate. On 8 April 1929, Singh, accompanied by Batukeshwar Dutt, threw two bombs into the Assembly chamber from its public gallery while it was in session. The bombs had been designed not to kill, but some members, including George Ernest Schuster, the finance member of the Viceroy's Executive Council, were injured. The smoke from the bombs filled the Assembly so that Singh and Dutt could probably have escaped in the confusion had they wished. Instead, they stayed shouting the slogan "Inquilab Zindabad!" ("Long Live the Revolution") and threw leaflets. The two men were arrested and subsequently moved through a series of jails in Delhi.

=== Assembly case trial ===
According to Neeti Nair, "public criticism of this terrorist action was unequivocal." Gandhi, once again, issued strong words of disapproval of their deed. Nonetheless, the jailed Bhagat was reported to be elated, and referred to the subsequent legal proceedings as a "drama". Singh and Dutt eventually responded to the criticism by writing the Assembly Bomb Statement:

We hold human life sacred beyond words. We are neither perpetrators of dastardly outrages ... nor are we 'lunatics' as the Tribune of Lahore and some others would have it believed ... Force when aggressively applied is 'violence' and is, therefore, morally unjustifiable, but when it is used in the furtherance of a legitimate cause, it has its moral justification.

The trial began in the first week of June, following a preliminary hearing in May. On 12 June, both men were sentenced to life imprisonment for: "causing explosions of a nature likely to endanger life, unlawfully and maliciously." Dutt had been defended by Asaf Ali, while Singh defended himself. Doubts have been raised about the accuracy of testimony offered at the trial. One key discrepancy concerns the automatic pistol that Singh had been carrying when he was arrested. Some witnesses said that he had fired two or three shots while the police sergeant who arrested him testified that the gun was pointed downward when he took it from him and that Singh "was playing with it." According to an article in the India Law Journal, the prosecution witnesses were coached, their accounts were incorrect, and Singh had turned over the pistol himself. Singh was given a life sentence.

==== Arrest of associates ====
In 1929, the HSRA had set up bomb factories in Lahore and Saharanpur. On 15 April 1929, the Lahore bomb factory was discovered by the police, leading to the arrest of other members of HSRA, including Sukhdev, Kishori Lal, and Jai Gopal. Not long after this, the Saharanpur factory was also raided and some of the conspirators became informants. With the new information available, the police were able to connect the three strands of the Saunders murder, Assembly bombing, and bomb manufacture. Singh, Sukhdev, Rajguru, and 21 others were charged with the Saunders murder.

==== Hunger strike and Lahore conspiracy case ====
Singh was re-arrested for murdering Saunders and Chanan Singh based on substantial evidence against him, including statements by his associates, Hans Raj Vohra and Jai Gopal. His life sentence in the Assembly Bomb case was deferred until the Saunders case was decided. He was sent to Central Jail Mianwali from the Delhi jail. There he witnessed discrimination between European and Indian prisoners. He considered himself, along with others, to be a political prisoner. He noted that he had received an enhanced diet at Delhi which was not being provided at Mianwali. He led other Indian, self-identified political prisoners he felt were being treated as common criminals in a hunger strike. They demanded equality in food standards, clothing, toiletries, and other hygienic necessities, as well as access to books and a daily newspaper. They argued that they should not be forced to do manual labour or any undignified work in the jail.

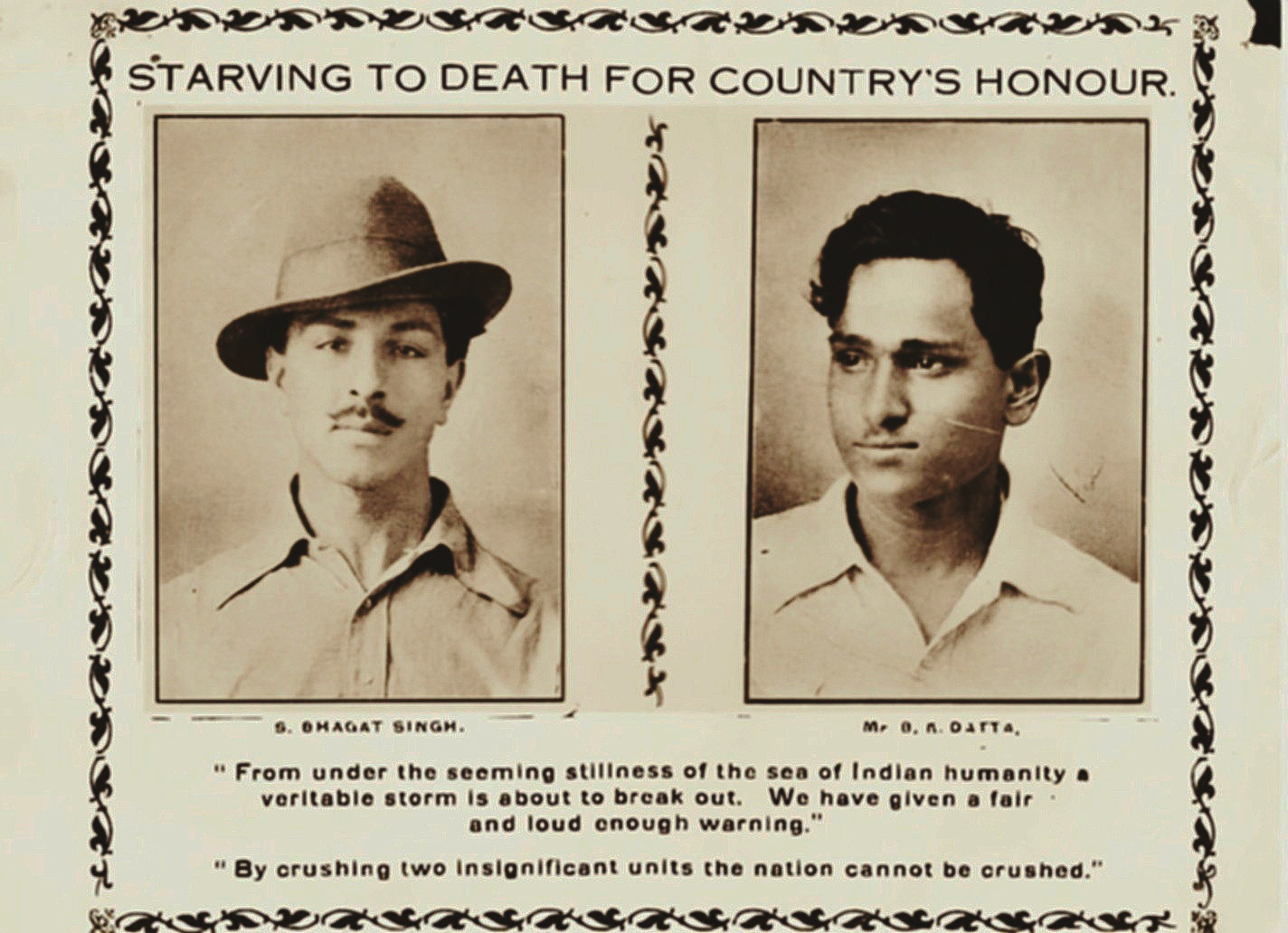
Hunger strike poster of Bhagat Singh and Batukeshswar Dutt

The hunger strike inspired a rise in public support for Singh and his colleagues from around June 1929. The Tribune newspaper was particularly prominent in this movement and reported on mass meetings in places such as Lahore and Amritsar. The government had to apply Section 144 of the criminal code in an attempt to limit gatherings.

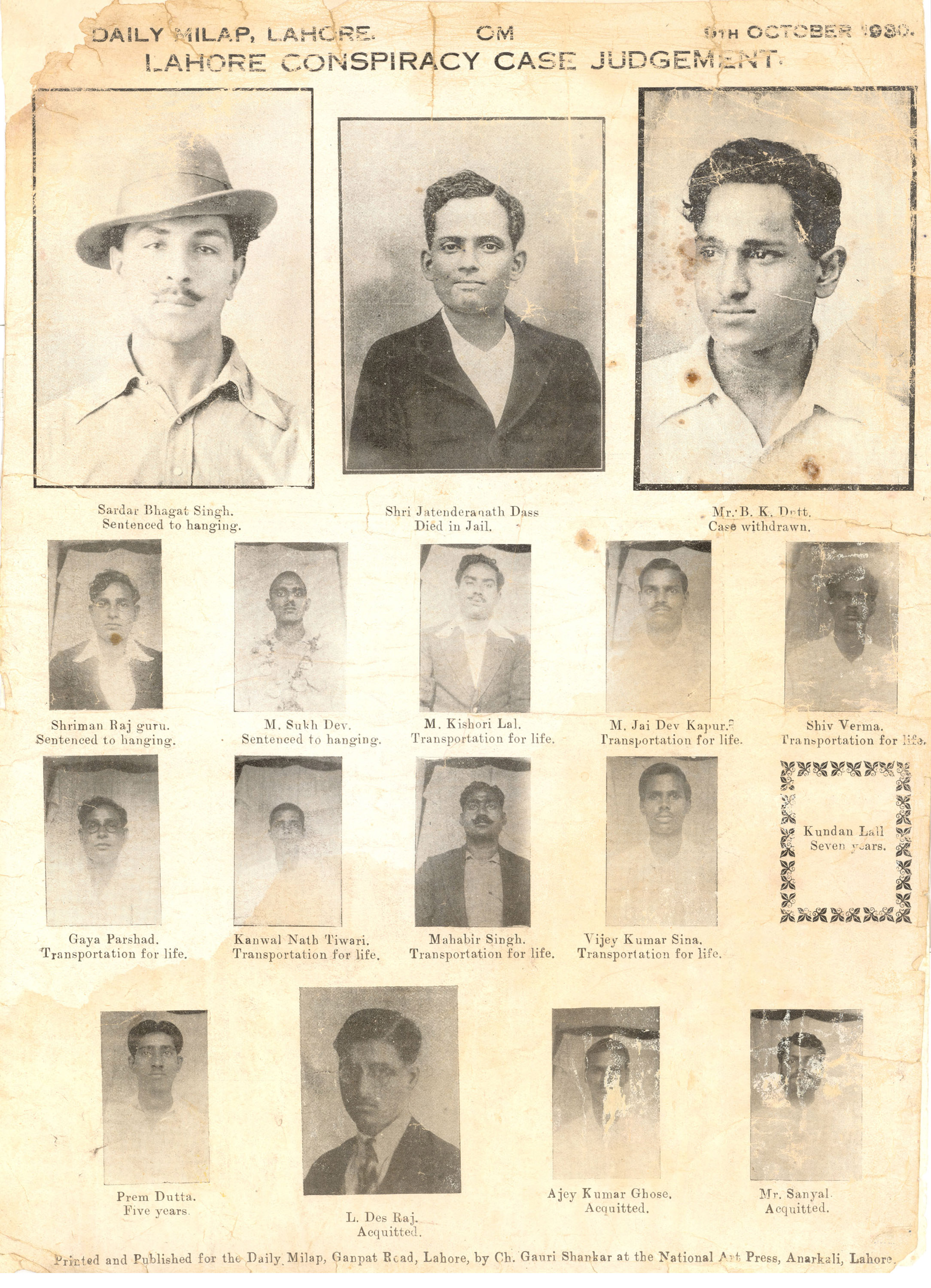
Lahore conspiracy case poster 9 October 1930

Jawaharlal Nehru met Singh and the other strikers in Central Jail Mianwali. After the meeting, he stated:

I was very much pained to see the distress of the heroes. They have staked their lives in this struggle. They want that political prisoners should be treated as political prisoners. I am quite hopeful that their sacrifice would be crowned with success.

Muhammad Ali Jinnah spoke in support of the strikers in the Assembly, saying:

The man who goes on hunger strike has a soul. He is moved by that soul, and he believes in the justice of his cause ... however much you deplore them and, however, much you say they are misguided, it is the system, this damnable system of governance, which is resented by the people.

The government tried to break the strike by placing different food items in the prison cells to test the prisoners' resolve. Water pitchers were filled with milk so that either the prisoners remained thirsty or broke their strike; nobody faltered and the impasse continued. The authorities then attempted force-feeding the prisoners but this was resisted. (Note: An example of the methods adopted to counterattack attempts at force-feeding is the swallowing of red pepper and boiling water by a prisoner called Kishori Lal. This combination made his throat too sore to permit entry of the feeding tube.) With the matter still unresolved, the Indian Viceroy, Lord Irwin, cut short his vacation in Simla to discuss the situation with jail authorities. Since the activities of the hunger strikers had gained popularity and attention nationwide, the government decided to advance the start of the Saunders murder trial, which was henceforth called the Lahore Conspiracy Case. Singh was transported to Borstal Jail, Lahore, and the trial began there on 10 July 1929. In addition to charging them with the murder of Saunders, Singh and the 27 other prisoners were charged with plotting a conspiracy to murder Scott, and waging a war against the King. Singh, still on hunger strike, had to be carried to the court handcuffed on a stretcher; he had lost 14 pounds (6.4 kg) from his original weight of 133 pounds (60 kg) since beginning the strike.

The government was beginning to make concessions but refused to move on the core issue of recognising the classification of "political prisoner". In the eyes of officials, if someone broke the law then that was a personal act, not a political one, and they were common criminals. By now, the condition of another hunger striker, Jatindra Nath Das, lodged in the same jail, had deteriorated considerably. The Jail committee recommended his unconditional release, but the government rejected the suggestion and offered to release him on bail. On 13 September 1929, Das died after a 63-day hunger strike. Almost all the nationalist leaders in the country paid tribute to Das' death. Mohammad Alam and Gopi Chand Bhargava resigned from the Punjab Legislative Council in protest, and Nehru moved a successful adjournment motion in the Central Assembly as a censure against the "inhumane treatment" of the Lahore prisoners. Singh finally heeded a resolution of the Congress party, and a request by his father, ending his hunger strike on 5 October 1929 after 116 days. During this period, Singh's popularity among common Indians extended beyond Punjab.

Singh's attention now turned to his trial, where he was to face a Crown prosecution team comprising C. H. Carden-Noad, Kalandar Ali Khan, Jai Gopal Lal, and the prosecuting inspector, Bakshi Dina Nath. The defence was composed of eight lawyers. Prem Dutt Verma, the youngest amongst the 27 accused, threw his slipper at Gopal when he turned and became a prosecution witness in court. As a result, the magistrate ordered that all the accused should be handcuffed. Singh and others refused to be handcuffed and were subjected to brutal beating. The revolutionaries refused to attend the court and Singh wrote a letter to the magistrate citing various reasons for their refusal. The magistrate ordered the trial to proceed without the accused or members of the HSRA. This was a setback for Singh as he could no longer use the trial as a forum to publicise his views.

==== Special Tribunal ====
To speed up the slow trial, the Viceroy, Lord Irwin, declared an emergency on 1 May 1930 and introduced an ordinance to set up a special tribunal composed of three high court judges for the case. This decision cut short the normal process of justice as the only appeal after the tribunal was to the Privy Council located in England.

On 2 July 1930, a habeas corpus petition was filed in the High Court challenging the ordinance on the grounds that it was ultra vires and, therefore, illegal; the Viceroy had no powers to shorten the customary process of determining justice. The petition argued that the Defence of India Act 1915 allowed the Viceroy to introduce an ordinance, and set up such a tribunal, only under conditions of a breakdown of law-and-order, which, it was claimed in this case, had not occurred. However, the petition was dismissed as being premature.

Carden-Noad presented the government's charges of conducting robberies, and the illegal acquisition of arms and ammunition among others. The evidence of G. T. H. Hamilton Harding, the Lahore superintendent of police, shocked the court. He stated that he had filed the first information report against the accused under specific orders from the chief secretary to the governor of Punjab and that he was unaware of the details of the case. The prosecution depended mainly on the evidence of P. N. Ghosh, Hans Raj Vohra, and Jai Gopal who had been Singh's associates in the HSRA. On 10 July 1930, the tribunal decided to press charges against only 15 of the 18 accused and allowed their petitions to be taken up for hearing the next day. The trial ended on 30 September 1930. The three accused, whose charges were withdrawn, included Dutt who had already been given a life sentence in the Assembly bomb case.

The ordinance (and the tribunal) would lapse on 31 October 1930 as it had not been passed by the Central Assembly or the British Parliament. On 7 October 1930, the tribunal delivered its 300-page judgement based on all the evidence and concluded that the participation of Singh, Sukhdev, and Shivaram Rajguru in Saunder's murder was proven. They were sentenced to death by hanging. Of the other accused, three were acquitted (Ajoy Ghosh, Jatindra Nath Sanyal and Des Raj) Kundan Lal received seven years' rigorous imprisonment, Prem Dutt received five years of the same, and the remaining seven Kishori Lal, Mahavir Singh, Bijoy Kumar Sinha, Shiv Verma, Gaya Prasad, Jaidev Kapoor and Kamal Nath Tewari were all sentenced to transportation for life.

==== Appeal to the Privy Council ====
In Punjab province, a defence committee drew up a plan to appeal to the Privy Council. Singh was initially against the appeal but later agreed to it in the hope that the appeal would popularise the HSRA in Britain. The appellants claimed that the ordinance which created the tribunal was invalid while the government countered that the Viceroy was completely empowered to create such a tribunal. The appeal was dismissed by Viscount Dunedin.

==== Reactions to the judgement ====
After the rejection of the appeal to the Privy Council, Congress party president Madan Mohan Malaviya filed a mercy appeal before Irwin on 14 February 1931. Some prisoners sent Mahatma Gandhi an appeal to intervene. In his notes dated 19 March 1931, the Viceroy recorded:

While returning Gandhiji asked me if he could talk about the case of Bhagat Singh because newspapers had come out with the news of his slated hanging on March 24th. It would be a very unfortunate day because on that day the new president of the Congress had to reach Karachi and there would be a lot of hot discussion. I explained to him that I had given a very careful thought to it but I did not find any basis to convince myself to commute the sentence. It appeared he found my reasoning weighty.

The Communist Party of Great Britain expressed its reaction to the case:

The history of this case, of which we do not come across any example in relation to the political cases, reflects the symptoms of callousness and cruelty which is the outcome of bloated desire of the imperialist government of Britain so that fear can be instilled in the hearts of the repressed people.

A plan to rescue Singh and fellow HSRA inmates from the jail failed. HSRA member Durga Devi's husband, Bhagwati Charan Vohra, attempted to manufacture bombs for the purpose, but died when they exploded accidentally.

=== Execution ===
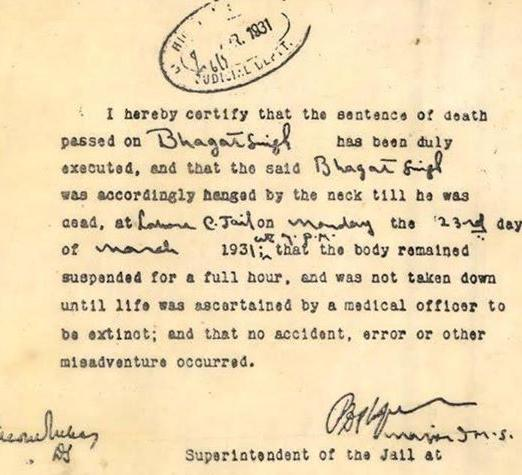
Death certificate of Bhagat Singh

Singh, Rajguru and Sukhdev were sentenced to death in the Lahore conspiracy case and ordered to be hanged on 24 March 1931. The schedule was moved forward by 11 hours and the three were hanged on 23 March 1931 at 7:30 pm in the Lahore jail. It is reported that no magistrate at the time was willing to supervise Singh's hanging as was required by law. The execution was supervised instead by an honorary judge named Nawab Muhammad Ahmed Khan Kasuri, who also signed the three death warrants, as their original warrants had expired.

After their bodies were hastily removed from the gallows, they were chopped into pieces, and stuffed into sacks. These sacks were then secretly taken out of the jail compound and were cremated under cover of darkness outside Ganda Singh Wala village, and then the ashes were thrown into the Sutlej river, about 10 kilometres (6.2 mi) from Ferozepore.

==== Criticism of the tribunal trial ====
Singh's trial has been described by the Supreme Court as "contrary to the fundamental doctrine of criminal jurisprudence" because there was no opportunity for the accused to defend themselves. The Special Tribunal was a departure from the normal procedure adopted for a trial and its decision could only be appealed to the Privy Council located in Britain. The accused were absent from the court and the judgement was passed ex-parte. The ordinance, which was introduced by the Viceroy to form the Special Tribunal, was never approved by the Central Assembly or the British Parliament, and it eventually lapsed without any legal or constitutional sanctity.

==== Reactions to the executions ====
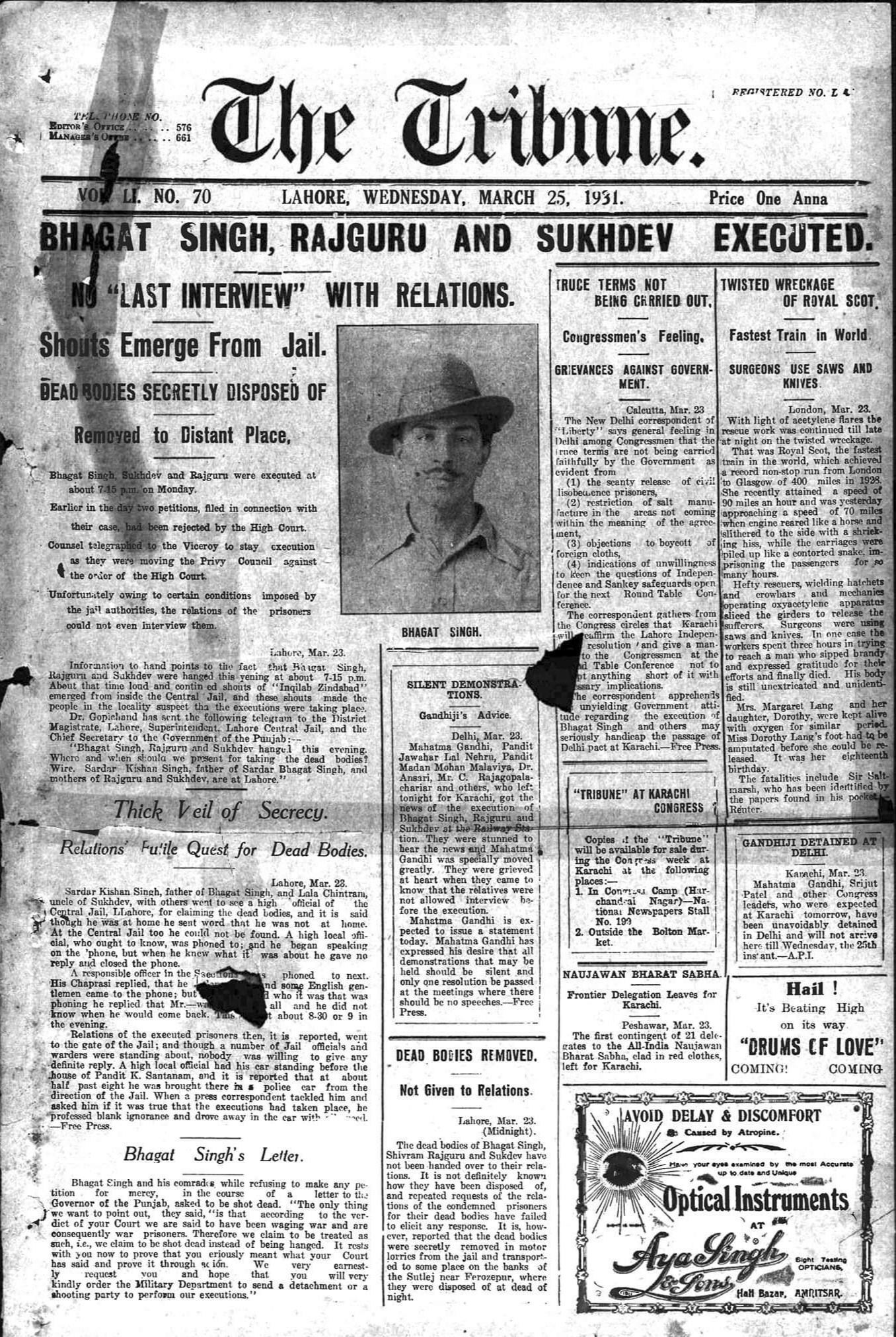
The Tribune news report of Sardar Bhagat Singh's execution,1931.

The executions were reported widely by the press, especially as they took place on the eve of the annual convention of the Congress party at Karachi. Gandhi faced black flag demonstrations by angry youths who shouted "Down with Gandhi". The New York Times reported:

A reign of terror in the city of Cawnpore in the United Provinces and an attack on Mahatma Gandhi by a youth outside Karachi were among the answers of the Indian extremists today to the hanging of Bhagat Singh and two fellow-assassins.

Hartals and strikes of mourning were called. The Congress party, during the Karachi session, declared:

While dissociating itself from and disapproving of political violence in any shape or form, this Congress places on record its admiration of the bravery and sacrifice of Bhagat Singh, Sukh Dev and Raj Guru and mourns with their bereaved families the loss of these lives. The Congress is of the opinion that their triple execution was an act of wanton vengeance and a deliberate flouting of the unanimous demand of the nation for commutation. This Congress is further of the opinion that the [British] Government lost a golden opportunity for promoting good-will between the two nations, admittedly held to be crucial at this juncture, and for winning over to methods of peace a party which, driven to despair, resorts to political violence.

In the issue of Young India of 29 March 1931, Gandhi wrote:

Bhagat Singh and his two associates have been hanged. The Congress made many attempts to save their lives and the Government entertained many hopes of it, but all has been in a vain.

Bhagat Singh did not wish to live. He refused to apologise, or even file an appeal. Bhagat Singh was not a devotee of non-violence, but he did not subscribe to the religion of violence. He took to violence due to helplessness and to defend his homeland. In his last letter, Bhagat Singh wrote, "I have been arrested while waging a war. For me there can be no gallows. Put me into the mouth of a cannon and blow me off." These heroes had conquered the fear of death. Let us bow to them a thousand times for their heroism.

But we should not imitate their act. In our land of millions of destitute and crippled people, if we take to the practice of seeking justice through murder, there will be a terrifying situation. Our poor people will become victims of our atrocities. By making a dharma of violence, we shall be reaping the fruit of our own actions.

Hence, though we praise the courage of these brave men, we should never countenance their activities. Our dharma is to swallow our anger, abide by the discipline of non-violence and carry out our duty.

==== Gandhi's role ====
On 23 March, Mahatama Gandhi had written a letter to viceroy appealing for commutation for the death sentences against Bhagat Singh, Sukhdev and Rajguru. While there have been unfounded claims that Gandhi had an opportunity to stop Singh's execution, it is held that Gandhi did not have enough influence with the British to stop the execution, much less arrange it, but that he did his best to save Singh's life. Gandhi supporters assert that Singh's role in the independence movement was no threat to Gandhi's role as its leader, so he would have no reason to want him dead. Gandhi always maintained that he was a great admirer of Singh's patriotism. He also stated that he was opposed to Singh's execution (and for that matter, capital punishment in general) and proclaimed that he had no power to stop it. Of Singh's execution Gandhi said: "The government certainly had the right to hang these men. However, there are some rights which do credit to those who possess them only if they are enjoyed in name only." Gandhi also once remarked about capital punishment: "I cannot in all conscience agree to anyone being sent to the gallows. God alone can take life, because he alone gives it." Gandhi had managed to have 90,000 political prisoners, who were not members of his Satyagraha movement, released under the Gandhi–Irwin Pact. According to a report in the Indian magazine Frontline, he did plead several times for the commutation of the death sentences of Singh, Rajguru and Sukhdev, including a personal visit on 19 March 1931. In a letter to the Viceroy on the day of their execution, he pleaded fervently for commutation, not knowing that the letter would arrive too late. Lord Irwin, the Viceroy, later said:

As I listened to Mr. Gandhi putting the case for commutation before me, I reflected first on what significance it surely was that the apostle of non-violence should so earnestly be pleading the cause of the devotees of a creed so fundamentally opposed to his own, but I should regard it as wholly wrong to allow my judgement to be influenced by purely political considerations. I could not imagine a case in which under the law, penalty had been more directly deserved.

== Ideals and opinions ==
=== Communism ===
Singh regarded Kartar Singh Sarabha, a founding-member of the Ghadar Party as his hero. Bhagat was also inspired by Bhai Parmanand, another founding-member of the Ghadar Party. Singh was attracted to anarchism and communism. He was an avid reader of the teachings of Mikhail Bakunin and also read Karl Marx, Vladimir Lenin and Leon Trotsky. In his last testament, "To Young Political Workers", he declares his ideal as the "Social reconstruction on new, i.e., Marxist, basis". Singh did not believe in the Gandhian ideology – which advocated Satyagraha and other forms of non-violent resistance, and felt that such politics would replace one set of exploiters with another.

From May to September 1928, Singh published a series of articles on anarchism in Kirti. He was concerned that the public misunderstood the concept of anarchism, writing that: "The people are scared of the word anarchism. The word anarchism has been abused so much that even in India revolutionaries have been called anarchist to make them unpopular." He clarified that anarchism refers to the absence of a ruler and abolition of the state, not the absence of order. He went on to say: "I think in India the idea of universal brotherhood, the Sanskrit sentence Vasudhaiva Kutumbakam etc., has the same meaning." He believed that:

The ultimate goal of Anarchism is complete independence, according to which no one will be obsessed with God or religion, nor will anybody be crazy for money or other worldly desires. There will be no chains on the body or control by the state. This means that they want to eliminate: the Church, God and Religion; the state; Private property.

On 21 January 1930, during the trial of the Lahore Conspiracy Case, Bhagat Singh and his HSRA comrades, appeared in the court wearing red scarves. When the magistrate took his chair, they raised slogans "Long Live Socialist Revolution", "Long Live Communist International", "Long Live People" "Lenin's Name Will Never Die", and "Down with Imperialism". Bhagat Singh then read the text of a telegram in the court and asked the magistrate to send it to the Third International. The telegram stated:

On Lenin day we send harty greetings to all who are doing something for carrying forward the ideas of the great Lenin. We wish success to the great experiment Russia is carrying out. We join our voice to that of the international working class movement. The proletariat will win. Capitalism will be defeated. Death to Imperialism.

Historian K. N. Panikkar described Singh as one of the early Marxists in India. The political theorist Jason Adams notes that he was more enamoured with Lenin than with Marx. From 1926 onward, he studied the history of the revolutionary movements in India and abroad. In his prison notebooks, he quoted Lenin in reference to imperialism and capitalism and also the revolutionary thoughts of Trotsky.

On the day of his execution, Bhagat Singh was reading the book, Reminiscences of Lenin, authored by Clara Zetkin, a German Marxist. When asked what his last wish was, Singh replied that he was studying the life of Lenin and he wanted to finish it before his death.

=== Atheism ===
Singh began to question religious ideologies after witnessing the Hindu–Muslim riots that broke out after Gandhi disbanded the Non-Cooperation Movement. He did not understand how members of these two groups, initially united in fighting against the British, could be at each other's throats because of their religious differences. At this point, Singh dropped his religious beliefs, since he believed religion hindered the revolutionaries' struggle for independence, and began studying the works of Bakunin, Lenin, Trotsky – all atheist revolutionaries. He also took an interest in Soham Swami's book Common Sense. (Note: Singh incorrectly referred to Niralamba Swami as the author of the book, however Niralamba had only written the introduction.)

While in prison in 1930–31, Bhagat Singh was approached by Randhir Singh, a fellow inmate, and a Sikh leader who would later found the Akhand Kirtani Jatha. According to Bhagat Singh's close associate Shiva Verma, who later compiled and edited his writings, Randhir Singh tried to convince Bhagat Singh of the existence of God, and upon failing berated him: "You are giddy with fame and have developed an ego that is standing like a black curtain between you and God". (Note: In his own account of the meeting though, Randhir Singh says that Bhagat Singh repented for giving up his religion and said that he did so only under the influence of irreligious people and in search of personal glory. Certain Sikh groups periodically attempt to reclaim Bhagat Singh as a Sikh based on Randhir Singh's writings.) In response, Bhagat Singh wrote an essay entitled "Why I Am an Atheist" to address the question of whether his atheism was born out of vanity. In the essay, he defended his own beliefs and said that he used to be a firm believer in the Almighty, but could not bring himself to believe the myths and beliefs that others held close to their hearts. He acknowledged the fact that religion made death easier, but also said that unproven philosophy is a sign of human weakness. In this context, he noted:

As regard the origin of God, my thought is that man created God in his imagination when he realised his weaknesses, limitations and shortcomings. In this way he got the courage to face all the trying circumstances and to meet all dangers that might occur in his life and also to restrain his outbursts in prosperity and affluence. God, with his whimsical laws and parental generosity was painted with variegated colours of imagination. He was used as a deterrent factor when his fury and his laws were repeatedly propagated so that man might not become a danger to society. He was the cry of the distressed soul for he was believed to stand as father and mother, sister and brother, brother and friend when in time of distress a man was left alone and helpless. He was Almighty and could do anything. The idea of God is helpful to a man in distress.

Towards the end of the essay, Bhagat Singh wrote:

Let us see how steadfast I am. One of my friends asked me to pray. When informed of my atheism, he said, "When your last days come, you will begin to believe." I said, "No, dear sir, Never shall it happen. I consider it to be an act of degradation and demoralisation. For such petty selfish motives, I shall never pray." Reader and friends, is it vanity? If it is, I stand for it.

=== "Killing the ideas" ===
In the leaflet he threw in the Central Assembly on 8 April 1929, he stated: "It is easy to kill individuals but you cannot kill the ideas. Great empires crumbled, while the ideas survived." While in prison, Singh and two others had written a letter to Lord Irwin, wherein they asked to be treated as prisoners of war and consequently to be executed by firing squad and not by hanging. Prannath Mehta, Singh's friend, visited him in the jail on 20 March, three days before his execution, with a draft letter for clemency, but he declined to sign it.

== Influence ==
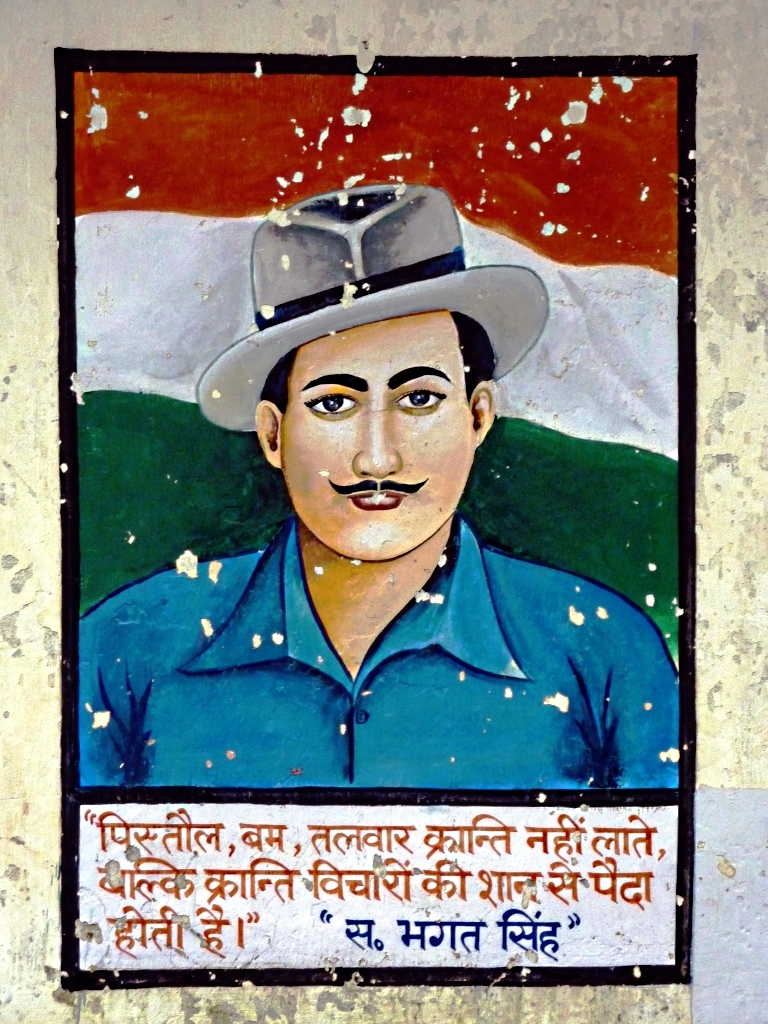
Wall painting of Singh, Rewalsar, Himachal Pradesh

Subhas Chandra Bose said that: "Bhagat Singh had become the symbol of the new awakening among the youths." Nehru acknowledged that Bhagat Singh's popularity was leading to a new national awakening, saying: "He was a clean fighter who faced his enemy in the open field ... he was like a spark that became a flame in a short time and spread from one end of the country to the other dispelling the prevailing darkness everywhere". Four years after Singh's hanging, the Director of the Intelligence Bureau, Horace Williamson, wrote: "His photograph was on sale in every city and township and for a time rivaled in popularity even that of Mr. Gandhi himself".

== Legacy and memorials ==
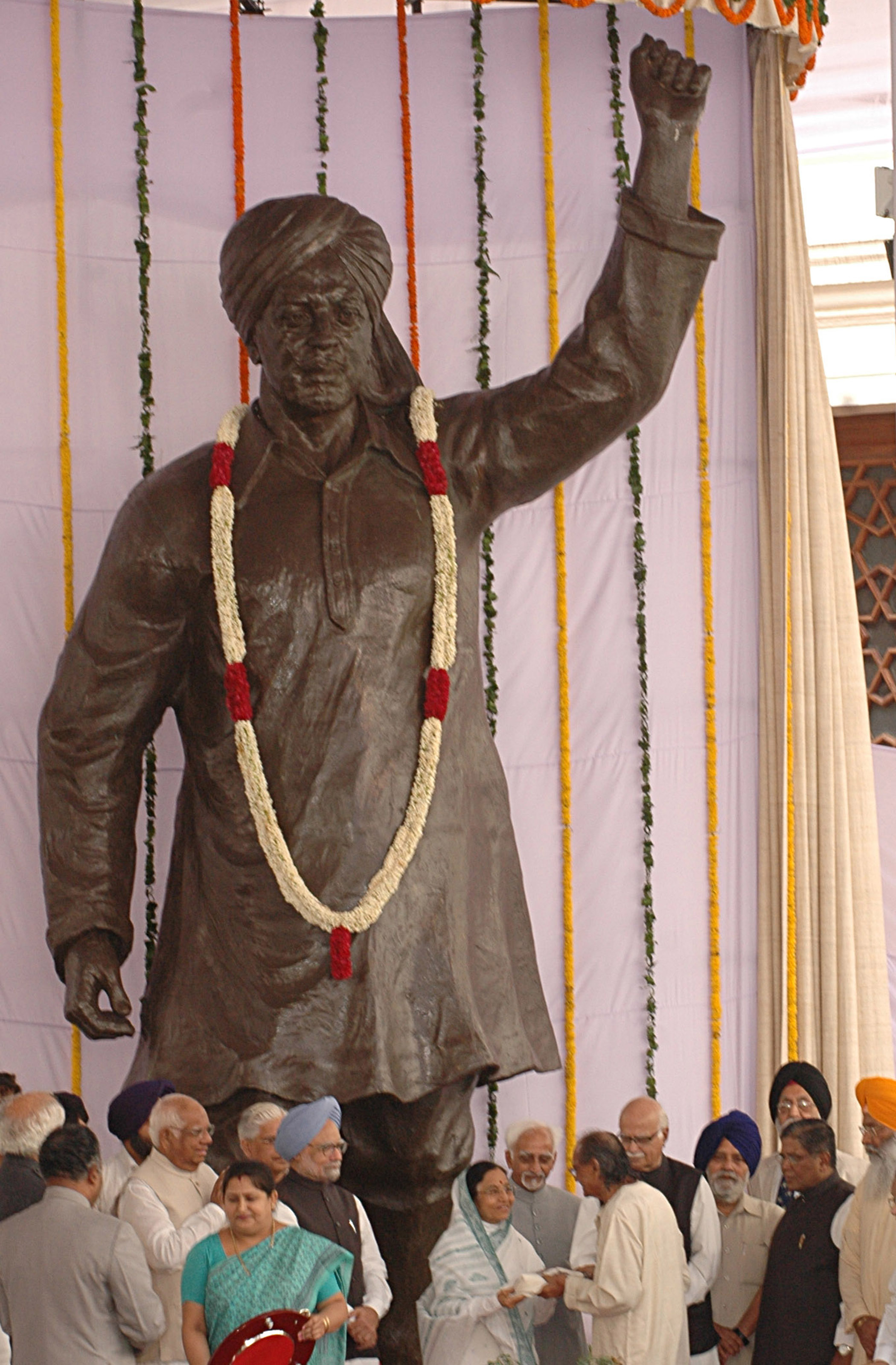
The then President, Pratibha Patil honouring the sculptor Ram V. Sutar who prepared the statue of Bhagat Singh, which is unveiled at the Parliament House of India, in New Delhi on 15 August 2008.

Bhagat Singh remains a significant figure in Indian iconography to the present day. His memory, however, defies categorisation and presents problems for various groups that might try to appropriate it. Pritam Singh, a professor who has specialised in the study of federalism, nationalism and development in India, notes that

Bhagat Singh represents a challenge to almost every tendency in Indian politics. Gandhi-inspired Indian nationalists, Hindu nationalists, Sikh nationalists, the parliamentary Left and the pro-armed struggle Naxalite Left compete with each other to appropriate the legacy of Bhagat Singh, and yet each one of them is faced with a contradiction in making a claim to his legacy. Gandhi-inspired Indian nationalists find Bhagat Singh's resort to violence problematic, the Hindu and Sikh nationalists find his atheism troubling, the parliamentary Left finds his ideas and actions as more close to the perspective of the Naxalites and the Naxalites find Bhagat Singh's critique of individual terrorism in his later life an uncomfortable historical fact.

The Governments formed by Hindu nationalist BJP has attempted to appropriate Bhagat Singh from his communist, atheistic roots and recast him as a Hindu icon.

- On 15 August 2008, an 18-foot tall bronze statue of Singh was installed in the Parliament of India, next to the statues of Indira Gandhi and Subhas Chandra Bose. A portrait of Singh and Dutt also adorns the walls of the Parliament House.

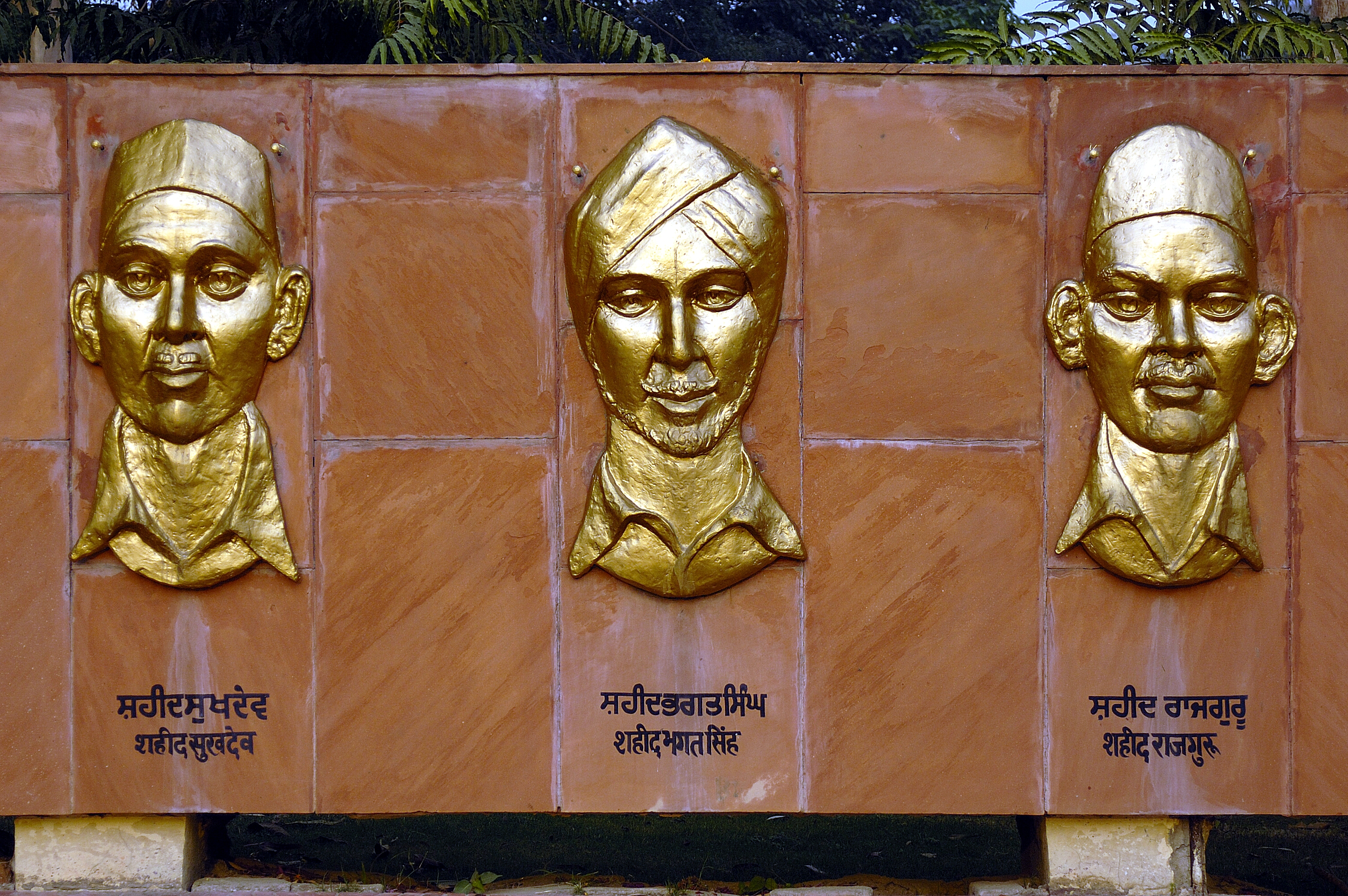
The National Martyrs Memorial, built at Hussainiwala in memory of Bhagat Singh, Sukhdev, and Rajguru

- Batukeshwar Dutt was cremated at Hussainiwala on 19 July 1965 in accordance with his last wishes, as was Singh's mother, Vidyawati. The National Martyrs Memorial was built on the cremation spot in 1968 and has memorials of Singh, Rajguru and Sukhdev. During the 1971 India–Pakistan war, the memorial was damaged and the statues of the martyrs were removed by the Pakistani Army. They have not been returned but the memorial was rebuilt in 1973.
- The Shaheedi Mela (Punjabi: Martyrdom Fair) is an event held annually on 23 March when people pay homage at the National Martyrs Memorial. The day is also observed across the Indian state of Punjab.
- The Shaheed-e-Azam Sardar Bhagat Singh Museum opened on the 50th anniversary of his death at his ancestral village, Khatkar Kalan. Exhibits include Singh's ashes, the blood-soaked sand, and the blood-stained newspaper in which the ashes were wrapped. A page of the first Lahore Conspiracy Case's judgement in which Kartar Singh Sarabha was sentenced to death and on which Singh put some notes is also displayed, as well as a copy of the Bhagavad Gita with Bhagat Singh's signature, which was given to him in the Lahore Jail, and other personal belongings.
- The Bhagat Singh Memorial was built in 2009 in Khatkar Kalan at a cost of ₹168 million (US$1.7 million).
- The Supreme Court of India established a museum to display landmarks in the history of India's judicial system, displaying records of some historic trials. The first exhibition that was organised was the Trial of Bhagat Singh, which opened on 28 September 2007, on the centenary celebrations of Singh's birth.

=== Modern days ===
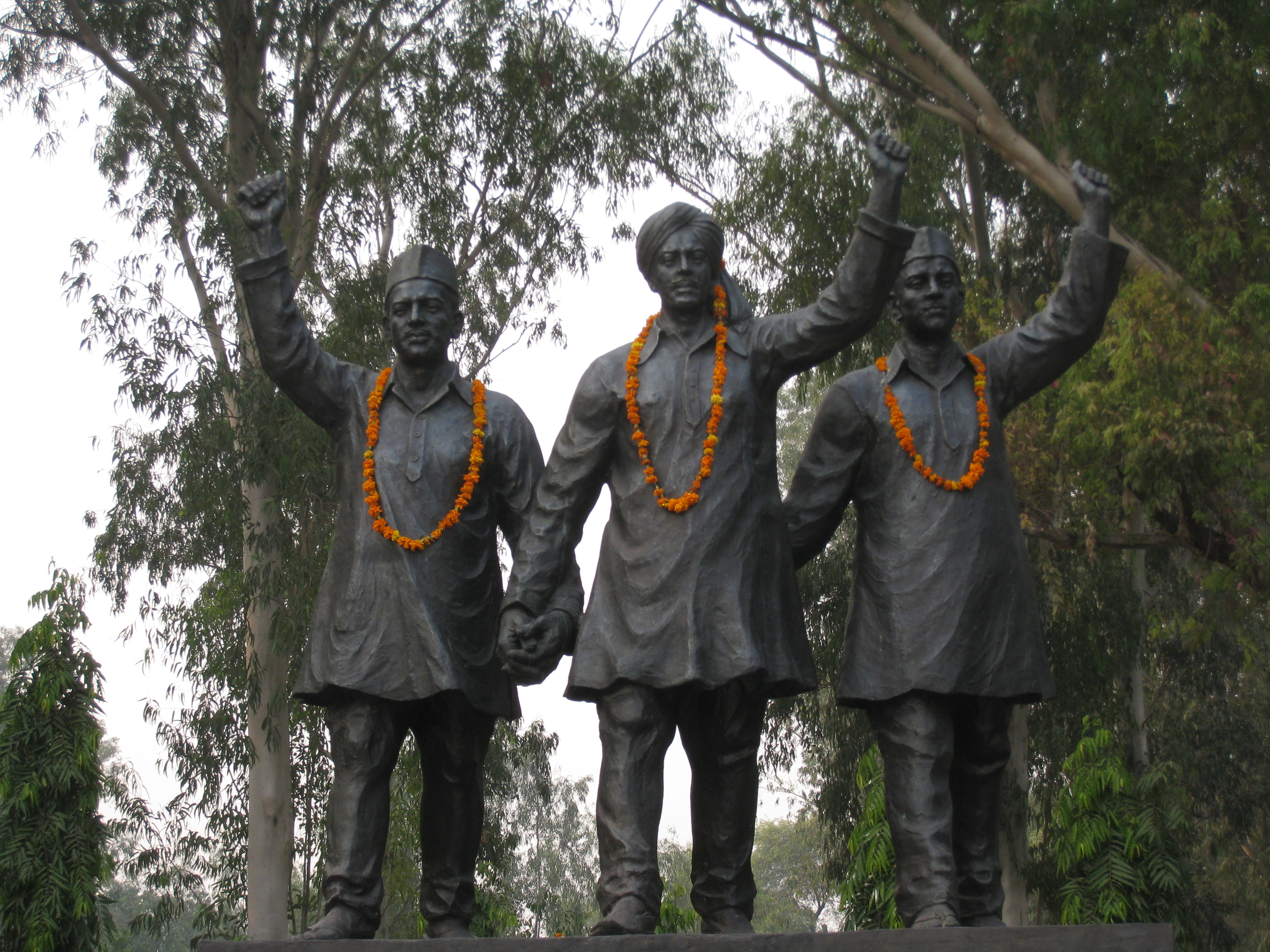
Statues of Bhagat Singh, Rajguru and Sukhdev at the India–Pakistan Border, near Hussainiwala

The youth of India still draw tremendous amount of inspiration from Singh. He was voted the "Greatest Indian" in a poll by the Indian magazine India Today in 2008, ahead of Bose and Gandhi. During the centenary of his birth, a group of intellectuals set up an institution named Bhagat Singh Sansthan to commemorate him and his ideals. The Parliament of India paid tributes and observed silence as a mark of respect in memory of Singh on 23 March 2001 and 2005. In Pakistan, after a long-standing demand by activists from the Bhagat Singh Memorial Foundation of Pakistan, the Shadman Chowk square in Lahore, where he was hanged, was renamed as Bhagat Singh Chowk. This change was successfully challenged in a Pakistani court. On 6 September 2015, the Bhagat Singh Memorial Foundation filed a petition in the Lahore high court and again demanded the renaming of the Chowk to Bhagat Singh Chowk.

==== Films and television ====
Several films have been made portraying the life and times of Singh.

- 1954: The first film based on his life was Shaheed-e-Azad Bhagat Singh, in which Prem Adeeb played the role of Singh.
- 1963: Shammi Kapoor starred as Bhagat Singh in Shaheed Bhagat Singh (film).
- 1965: Manoj Kumar portrayed Bhagat Singh in Shaheed.
- 1974: Som Dutt portrayed Singh in Amar Shaheed Bhagat Singh.
- 1999: Gurdas Mann played the role of Singh in Shaheed Udham Singh, a film based on life of Udham Singh.
- 2002: Three films about Singh were released – Shaheed-E-Azam; 23rd March 1931: Shaheed; and The Legend of Bhagat Singh – in which Singh was portrayed by Sonu Sood, Bobby Deol and Ajay Devgn respectively.
- 2002: Bhagat Singh, a drama film directed by Anand Sagar and written/produced Ramanand Sagar was aired on DD National. It featured Deepak Dutta in the titular role.
- 2006: Siddharth played the role of Bhagat Singh in the film Rang De Basanti, a film drawing parallels between revolutionaries of Bhagat Singh's era and modern Indian youth.
- 2008: Nehru Memorial Museum and Library (NMML) and Act Now for Harmony and Democracy (ANHAD), a non-profit organisation, co-produced a 40-minute documentary on Bhagat Singh entitled Inqilab, directed by Gauhar Raza.
- 2018: In the independent film Shaheed-E-Aazam about freedom fighter Kamal Nath Tiwari, Singh is played by Rahul Pathak.
- 2018: Karam Rajpal portrayed Bhagat Singh in Star Bharat's television series Chandrashekhar, which is based on life of Indian revolutionary and freedom fighter Chandra Shekhar Azad.
- 2020: Rishabh Raj portrays Singh in Shaheed Chandrashekhar Azaad, another film about Azad.
- 2021: Amol Parashar portrayed Singh in Sardar Udham, another film based on Udham Singh's life.
- 2022: Vivek Mishra plays Singh in the film Hero of Nation Chandra Shekhar Azad about Azad.

==== Theatre ====
Singh, Sukhdev and Rajguru have been the inspiration for a number of plays in India and Pakistan, that continue to attract crowds.

==== Songs ====
Although not written by Singh, the patriotic Hindustani songs, "Sarfaroshi Ki Tamanna" ("The desire to sacrifice") created by Bismil Azimabadi, and "Mera Rang De Basanti Chola" ("O Mother! Dye my robe the colour of spring") created by Ram Prasad Bismil, are largely associated with him and have been used in a number of related films.

==== Other ====
In 1968, a postage stamp was issued in India commemorating the 61st birth anniversary of Singh. A ₹5 coin commemorating him was released for circulation in 2012. A first-person shooter (FPS) based on the assassination of Saunders and following events titled Bhagat Singh: The Game was released in 2002, concurring with the spate of Hindi films on Singh that year, which was the first video game with 3D graphics and first FPS developed in India according to Scroll.in.

== Books ==
- Singh, Bhagat (2007). Bhagat Singh : ideas on freedom, liberty and revolution : Jail notes of a revolutionary. Gurgaon: Hope India. ISBN 9788178710563. OCLC 506510146.
- Singh, Bhagat; Press, General (31 December 2019). Jail Diary and Other Writings. GENERAL PRESS. ISBN 978-93-89716-06-1.
- Singh, Bhagat (28 January 2010). Ideas of a Nation: Singh, Bhagat. Penguin Books Limited. ISBN 978-81-8475-191-8.
- Singh, Bhagat; Press, General (2 October 2019). No Hanging, Please Shoot Us. GENERAL PRESS. ISBN 978-93-89440-70-6.
- Singh, Bhagat (2020). The Complete Writings of Bhagat Singh : Why I am an Atheist, The Red Pamphlet, Introduction to Dreamland, Letter to Jaidev Gupta ... and other works. Chicago: DXBooks. ISBN 9782291088691. OCLC 1153081094.
- Singh, Bhagat (2009). Selected works of Bhagat Singh. Big Red Oak. ISBN 978-1-4495-5861-1.
- Singh, Bhagat (2007). Śahīda Bhagata Siṃha : dastāvejoṃ ke āine meṃ. Naī Dillī: Prakāśana Vibhāga, Sūcanā aura Prasāraṇa Mantrālaya, Bhārata Sarakāra. ISBN 9788123014845. OCLC 429632571.
- Singh, Bhagat (15 August 2019). Letter to my Father. Sristhi Publishers & Distributors.
- Singh, Bhagat (2008). Bhagatasiṃha ke rājanītika dastāveja (in Hindi). National Book Trust. ISBN 978-81-237-5109-2.
- Singh, Bhagat (2010). Bhagat Singh ke siyāsī dastāvez (in Urdu). National Book Trust, India.

== See also ==
- Lala Ram Saran Das Talwar
- Dharam Singh Hayatpur
- Harnam Singh Saini
- Kartar Singh Sarabha
- Udham Singh
- Baikuntha Shukla
