= Ramnath Kare =

Indian industrialist (born 1934)

- Born: 18 October 1934 (age 92); Goa, Portuguese India
- Other names: Ramnathbab; Babu
- Education: St. Xavier's College, Bombay
- Occupations: Industrialist; educationist; philanthropist
- Title: Founder of DCI Pharmaceuticals Pvt Ltd; Chairman of Kare Group

Ramnath Govind Kare (born 18 October 1934), also known as Ramnathbab and Babu. is an Indian industrialist, educationist, and philanthropist based in Margao, Goa. An avid reader, he studied at St Xaviers College in Bombay.

== Enterprises ==
Kare started DCI Pharmaceuticals Pvt Ltd in Margao in 1968. He took over an aluminium packaging unit, Classic Extrusion Pvt Ltd at the Margao Industrial Estate, and started more pharma units at the Verna Industrial Estate, Verna and at Ponda, both in Goa.

== Personal life ==
His father, Govind Ramnath Kare, began with small time trading in pharmaceutical products and founded Drogaria Salcete in 1932. He assisted his father in setting up the Salcete Pharmacy, when Goa was still under Portuguese rule. As there was an Indian blockade of Goa between 1955 and 1961, the Portuguese government then in power allowed businessmen to procure pharmaceutical products from reputed foreign companies, such as Abbott Laboratories, Merck, Takede Chemicals and the like.

His family started a small drug manufacturing unit in Thane near Mumbai in 1946, Indoco Remedies Farmacia Salcete and Drogaria Salcete became prominent names in Goa, and were looked after by Kare's youngest brother, Ashok, who died in 2012. These firms are now managed by his two sons, Salil and Kunal.

His younger brother Suresh took over the manufacturing unit near Mumbai, and over the years it grew to a turnover of Rs 1500 crore annually. Suresh Kare subsequently handed it over to his daughter, Aditi Panandikar.

== Philanthropy and education ==
He has been associated with the Margao-based educational network, the Vidya Vikas Mandal, of which he was the president. The VVM runs the prominent Shree Damodar College of Commerce & Economics in Margao besides the Vidya Vikas Academy and a number of other institutions.

Kare has narrated how he helped build the VVM, facing a crisis due to a lack of funds to clear teaching staff salary arrears, and a crash in the structure of the existing rented premises during the monsoons. In 1979, the Kare family donated to start the Govind Ramnath Kare College of Law. The GVM has since expanded and grown. It claims a total of 5,000 students on its rolls and about 400 teaching and non-teaching staff.

== Posts held ==
Kare has been the president of the Goa Chambers of Commerce and Industry. He has been on the board of State Bank of India- Mumbai Board, State Bank of India Mutual, the Economic Development Corporation (EDC), Finolex, Holiday Inn and among others.

== Views ==
In 2002, as Chairman of the Kare Group, he has been quoted as having wondered why Goa "could not be like Switzerland where tourism and industry go hand in hand".
