= Pandit Kishori Lal =

Indian revolutionary (1912–1990)

Kishori Lal
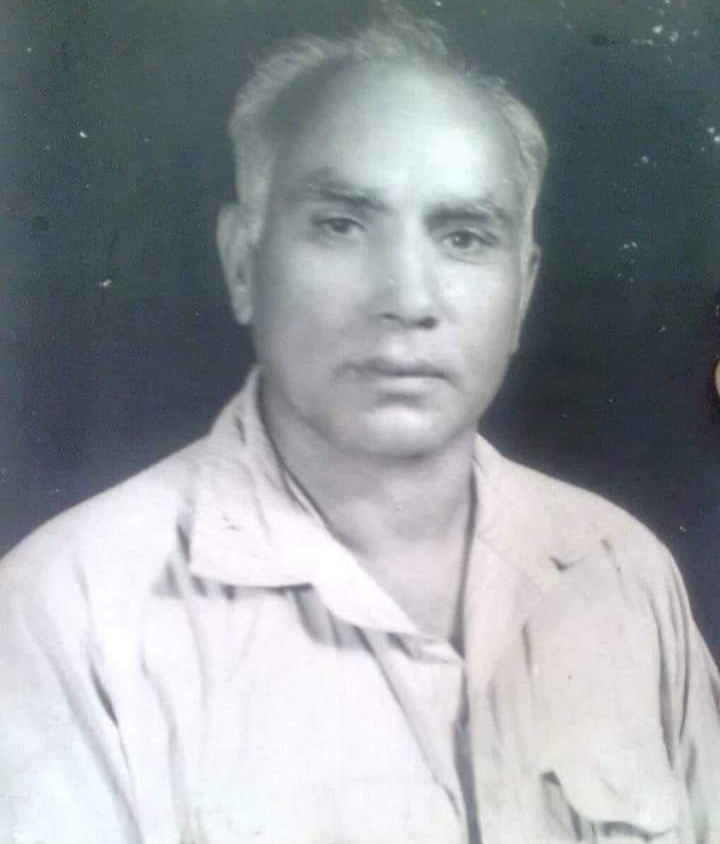
- Born: 1912; Dharampur, Dasuya tehsil, Hoshiarpur district, British India (present-day India)
- Died: 11 July 1990 (aged 78); Jalandhar, Punjab, India
- Occupations: Revolutionary; Politician
- Years active: 1928–1946; 1948–1990
- Employer(s): Hindustan Socialist Republican Association; Naujawan Bharat Sabha
- Political party: Communist Party of India (Marxist)
- Partners: Sukhdev Thapar; Jai Gopal

Pandit Kishori Lal (1912 – 11 July 1990) was a communist Indian revolutionary from Punjab who worked with Sukhdev Thapar and the Hindustan Socialist Republican Association (HSRA).

== Early life ==
He was born in village Dharampur, tehsil Dasuya, Hoshiarpur district, Punjab. This village coordinates 31.880761°N 75.914580°E – is situated on the south-western slopes of the Sola Singhi range. He attended primary school in Dharampur and then moved to Quetta (present-day Pakistan) where his father was posted as a Sanskrit teacher. After finishing his matriculation in Quetta, he joined DAV College Lahore to pursue higher studies.

== Political life ==
His father and three elder brothers were all imbued with the spirit of Indian nationalism. In early 1928, Lal joined the Naujawan Bharat Sabha, thereby coming into direct and close contact with the founder of the group, Bhagat Singh. The group instilled revolutionary ideas among the youth and prepared them for the struggle for India's freedom.

He was involved with the HSRA bomb-making unit at 69 Kashmiri Building, Lahore, from where he was arrested on 15 April 1929 along with Sukhdev Thapar and Jai Gopal. While he was being held in jail as an undertrial prisoner, Lal participated in a historic hunger strike by the HSRA members. At the conclusion of the trial in the Lahore Conspiracy Case 1929, the judge sentenced Singh, Shivaram Rajguru and Sukhdev to death by hanging. Lal was sentenced to transportation for life. He served his 18-year sentence in the jails of Lahore, Multan and Montgomery. He spent nearly five years in solitary confinement due to his rebellious nature.

While in jail, he came in contact with a number of communist prisoners and started reading Marxist literature. Under this influence, his world outlook underwent a change, and in 1936 he applied for party membership from jail. He was registered as a Communist Party member in 1942.

After his release from jail in 1946, he asked the party to allot him work on the trade union front, where he worked with his customary zeal. He was elected as president of the Punjab unit of All India Trade Union Congress (AITUC) in 1948.

In January 1948, nearly 1500 members, including Lal of the Punjab unit of the Communist Party of India, broke away and founded the Lal Communist Party Hind Union. This party carried out militant agrarian struggles in the PEPSU region of Punjab. After nearly four years, the Lal Communist Party was reunified with its parent party in July 1952.

In early 1952, Lal took part in the movement for the liberation of Goa which was under Portuguese control. He was a committee member of the Communist Party of India (Marxist) at Punjab state level for a number of years. In his later years, he served as in-charge of the Punjab Book Centre at Jalandhar. He was also active on the Desh Bhagat Yadgar Committee at Jalandhar.

== Death ==
Lal died on 11 July 1990 in a hospital of Jalandhar, following a road accident. He was 78 years old.
