= Anwesha Singbal =

Konkani Writer

Anwesha Arun Singbal
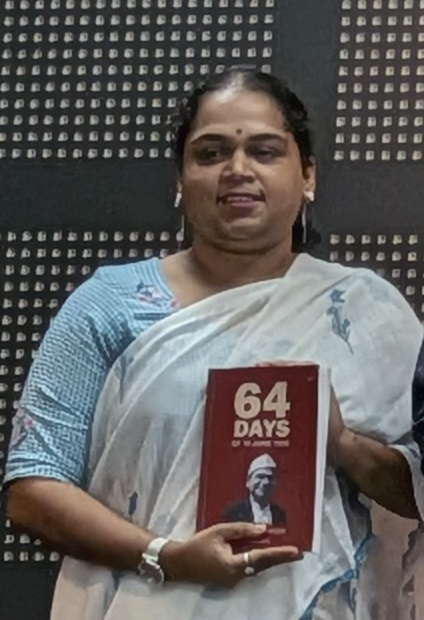
- Singbal in 2026
- Born: 22 March 1986 (age 40)
- Known for: First female president of Konkani Bhasha Mandal
- Writing career
- Language: Konkani language
- Notable work: Sulus
- Notable awards: Yuva Puraskar in Konkani (2016)

Anwesha Arun Singbal (born 22 March 1986) is an Indian writer. She won the 2016 Sahitya Akademi's Yuva Puraskar in Konkani language for her poetry collection, Sulus. She was the first female president of Konkani Bhasha Mandal.
