= T. Ramachandra Rao =

Indian civil servant

Tanjore Ramachandra Rao
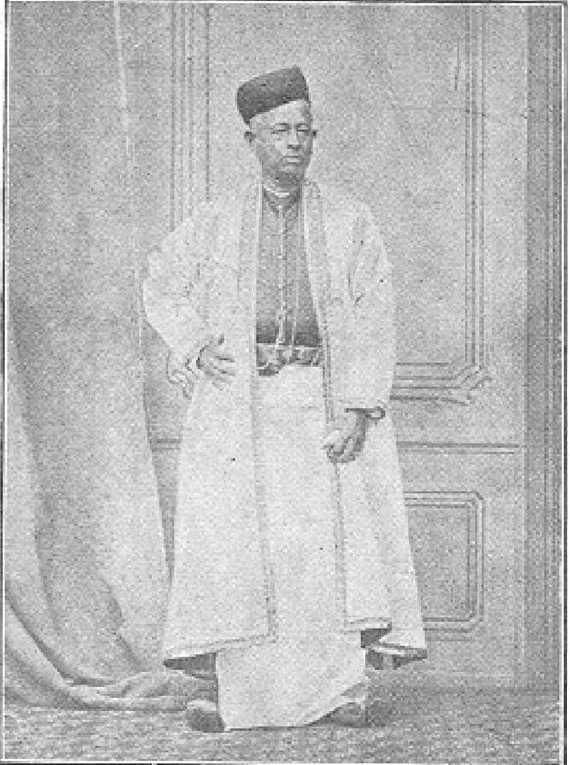
- A portrait of Tanjore Ramachandra Rao
- Born: Ramachandra; 1825; Tanjore
- Died: 1879 (aged 53–54); Madras
- Occupations: civil servant, translator
- Known for: First Indian to serve as Deputy Commissioner of Police, Madras

Tanjore Ramachandra Rao (1825–1879) was an Indian civil servant who became the first native Indian to serve as Deputy Commissioner of Police of Madras.

== Early life ==
Ramachandra Rao was born in Tanjore in 1825 in a Deshastha Brahmin family which traced its origins to Bijapur. After brief initial education, Ramachandra Rao moved to Madras in 1840 and caught the attention of Major Crisp, translator to the Madras government, who trained him in calculation and computation and employed Rao as his private writer from August 1840 to March 1841. Later, through Crisp's recommendation, Ramachandra Rao was appointed Superintendent of the Madras observatory.

== Early career ==
In January 1844, Ramachandra Rao joined the Military Fund Office as a minute writer but switched over to the Police Department in October 1847. Ramachandra Rao's proficiency in multiple languages won him rapid promotions until 1854, when he was appointed Interpreter to the Chief Magistrate. Shortly afterwards, Rao was appointed Kannada translator to the Supreme Court of Madras with the backing of John Bruce Norton.

== As Deputy Commissioner of Police ==
During the tenure of Charles Trevelyan as Governor of Madras, Ramachandra Rao was appointed Deputy Commissioner of Police with Boulderson as the Commissioner. Ramachandra Rao was the first Indian to serve in the post.

As Deputy Commissioner, Ramachandra Rao successfully solved the case of a burglary in Adyar, the Dindigul Robbery Case and the Great Note Forgery Case of 1875.

In 1875, he was in charge of the security arrangements during the visit of the Prince of Wales (later King Edward VII) of India. Rao earned the praise of Prince Albert Edward and was personally presented a gold chain by him.

== Later years ==
Ramachandra Rao retired in late 1878 due to failing health. He died in mid-1879 at the age of 54.
