= Amrit Bharat Station Scheme =

Indian Railways redevelopment scheme

Amrit Bharat Station Scheme (ABSS)
- Emblem of India
- Type of project: Infrastructure
- Country: India
- Prime Minister(s): Narendra Modi
- Ministry: Ministry of Railways
- Key people: Ashwini Vaishnaw
- Launched: 6 August 2023; 3 years ago
- Funding: ₹24,470 crore (US$2.5 billion)
- Status: Active
- Website: Indian Railways; Amrit Bharat Station Scheme

Amrit Bharat Station Scheme (ABSS) is an ongoing Indian Railways mission launched in December 2022 by the Ministry of Railways to redevelop 1275 stations nationwide. It is both enabler and beneficiary of other key Government of India schemes, such as BharatNet, One Station One Product, Make in India, Startup India, Standup India, industrial corridors, Bharatmala, Dedicated Freight Corridor Corporation of India and Sagarmala.

== Evolution of station redevelopment schemes ==
The development of railway station infrastructure in India has progressed through several successive schemes. The Model Station Scheme, introduced in June 1999, covered 594 stations was implemented until November 2008, followed by the Modern Station Scheme, covered 637 stations, which was undertaken during 2006–07 and 2007–08. Both schemes have since been completed. The Adarsh Station Scheme, covering 1253 stations, was subsequently introduced to improve passenger amenities and upgrade existing stations. It was followed by the Amrit Bharat Station Scheme.

While the Adarsh scheme primarily focused on improving passenger amenities, the Amrit Bharat scheme envisages comprehensive, phased redevelopment based on master plans, including improved passenger facilities, multimodal integration, better connectivity with the surrounding city, and station designs reflecting local architecture and culture.

== Stations to be redeveloped ==
The table below lists all the stations under the project.

| S.no | State | Count | Name of stations |
|---|---|---|---|
| 1 | Andhra Pradesh | 74 | Adoni, Anakapalle, Anantapur, Anaparthi, Araku, Bapatla, Bhimavaram Town, Bobbili Jn Chipurupalle, Chirala, Chittoor, Cumbum, Dharmavaram, Dhone Jn, Donakonda, Duvvada, Elamanchili, Eluru, Giddalur, Gooty Jn, Gudivada, Gudur Junction, Gunadala, Guntur Jn, Hindupur, Ichchpuram, Kadapa, Kadiri, Kakinada Town, Kottavalasa Jn, Kuppam, Kurnool city, Macherla, Machilipatnam, Madanapalli Road, Mangalagiri, Markapuram Road, Mantralayam Road, Nadikude Jn, Nandyal, Narasaraopet, Narsapur, Naupada Jn, Nellore, Nidadavolu, Ongole, Pakala Jn, Palasa, Parvatipuram, Piduguralla, Piler, Pithapuram, Rajamundry, Rayanapadu, Razampeta, Renigunta Jn, Repalle, Samalkota Junction, Sattenapalle, Simhachalam, Singaraykonda, Sri Kalahasti, Srikakulam Road, Sullurpeta, Tadepalligudem, Tadipatri, Tenali Jn, Tirupati, Tuni, Vijayawada, Vinukonda, Vishakhapatnam, Vizianagaram Jn |
| 2 | Arunachal Pradesh | 1 | Naharalagun (Itanagar) |
| 3 | Assam | 49 | Amguri, Arunachal, Chaparmukh, Dhemaji, Dhubri, Dibrugarh, Diphu, Duliajan, Fakiragram Jn., Gauripur, Gohpur, Golaghat, Gosaigaon Hat, Haibargaon, Harmuti, Hojai, Jagiroad, Jorhat Town, Kamakhya, Kokrajhar, Lanka, Ledo, Lumding, Majbat, Makum Jn, Margherita, Mariani, Murkeongselek, Naharkatiya, Nalbari, Namrup, Narangi, New Bongaigaon, New Haflong, New Karimganj, New Tinsukia, North Lakhimpur, Pathsala, Rangapara North, Rangiya Jn, Sarupathar, Sibsagar Town, Silapathar, Silchar, Simaluguri, Tangla, Tinsukia, Udalguri, Viswanath Chariali |
| 4 | Bihar | 87 | Anugraha Narayan Road, Ara, Bakhtiyarpur, Banka, Banmankhi, Bapudham Motihari, Barauni, Barh, Barsoi Jn, Begusarai, Bettiah, Bhabua Road, Bhagalpur, Bhagwanpur, Bihar Sharif, Bihiya, Bikramganj, Buxar, Chausa, Chakia, Chhapra, Dalsingh Sarai, Darbhanga, Dauram Madhepura, Dehri On Sone, Dholi, Dighwara, Dumraon, Durgauti, Fatuha, Gaya, Ghorasahan, Guraru, Hajipur Jn, Jamalpur, Jamui, Janakpur Road, Jaynagar, Jehanabad, Jhanjharpur Junction, Kahalgaon, Karhagola Road, Khagaria Jn, Kishanganj, Kudra, Labha, Laheria Sarai, Lakhisarai, Lakhminia, Madhubani, Maheshkhunt, Mairwa, Mansi Jn, Munger, Muzaffarpur, Nabinagar Road, Narkatiaganj, Naugachia, Paharpur, Piro, Pirpainti, Rafiganj, Raghunathpur, Rajendra Nagar, Rajgir, Ram Dayalu Nagar, Raxaul, Sabaur, Sagauli, Saharsa, Sahibpur Kamal, Sakri, Salauna, Salmari, Samastipur, Sasaram, Shahpur Patoree,Sheikhpura jn, Shivanarayanpur, Simri Bakhtiyarpur, Simultala, Sitamarhi, Siwan, Sonpur Jn., Sultanganj, Supaul, Taregna, Thakurganj, Thawe, |
| 5 | Chhattisgarh | 32 | Akaltara, Ambikapur, Baikunthpur Road, Balod, Baradwar, Belha, Bhanupratappur, Bhatapara, Bhilai, Bhilai Nagar, Bhilai Power House, Bilaspur, Champa, Dallirajhara, Dongargarh, Durg, Hathbandh, Jagdalpur, Janjgir Naila, Korba, Mahasamund, Mandir Hasaud, Marauda, Nipania, Pendra Road, Raigarh, Raipur, Rajnandgaon, Sarona, Tilda-Neora, Urkura, Uslapur |
| 6 | Delhi | 13 | Adarsh Nagar, Anand Vihar, Bijwasan, Delhi, Delhi Cantt, Delhi Sarai Rohilla, Delhi Shahdara, Hazrat Nizamuddin, Narela, New Delhi, Sabzi Mandi, Safdarjung, Tilak Bridge |
| 7 | Goa | 2 | Sanvordem, Vasco-da-gama |
| 8 | Gujarat | 87 | Ahmedabad, Anand, Ankleshwar, Asarva, Bardoli, Bhachau, Bhaktinagar, Bhanvad, Bharuch, Bhatiya, Bhavnagar, Bhestan, Bhildi, Bilimora (NG), Bilimora Jn, Botad Jn., Chandlodia, Chorvad Road, Dabhoi Jn, Dahod, Dakor, Derol, Dhrangadhra, Dwarka, Gandhidham, Godhra Jn, Gondal, Hapa, Himmatnagar, Jam Jodhpur, Jamnagar, Jamwanthali, Junagadh, Kalol, Kanalus Jn., Karamsad, Keshod, Khambhaliya, Kim, Kosamba Jn., Lakhtar, Limbdi, Limkheda, Mahemadabad & Kheda road, Mahesana, Mahuva, Maninagar, Mithapur, Miyagam Karjan, Morbi, Nadiad, Navsari, New Bhuj, Okha, Padadhari, Palanpur, Palitana, Patan, Porbandar, Pratapnagar, Rajkot, Rajula Jn., Sabarmati (BG & MG), Sachin, Samakhiyali, Sanjan, Savarkundla, Sayan, Siddhpur, Sihor Jn., Somnath, Songadh, Surat, Surendranagar, Than, Udhna, Udvada, Umargaon Road, Unjha, Utran, Vadodara, Vapi, Vatva, Veraval, Viramgam, Vishvamitri Jn., Wankaner |
| 9 | Haryana | 30 | Ambala Cantt., Ambala City, Bahadurgarh, Ballabhgarh, Bhiwani Jn, Charkhi Dadri, Faridabad, Faridabad NIT, Gohana, Gurugram, Hisar, Hodal, Jind, Kalka, Karnal, Kosli, Kurukshetra, Mahendragarh, Mandi Dabwali, Mandi Adampur, Narnaul, Narwana, Palwal, Panipat, Pataudi Road, Rewari, Rohtak, Sirsa, Sonipat, Yamunanagar Jagadhari |
| 10 | Himachal Pradesh | 3 | Amb Andaura, Baijnath Paprola, Palampur |
| 11 | Jharkhand | 57 | Balsiring, Bano, Barajamda Jn, Barkakana, Basukinath, Bhaga, Bokaro Steel City, Chaibasa, Chakradharpur, Chandil, Chandrapura, Daltonganj, Dangoaposi, Deoghar, Dhanbad, Dumka, Gamharia, Gangaghat, Garhwa Road, Garhwa Town, Ghatsila, Giridih, Godda, Govindpur Road, Haidarnagar, Hatia, Hazaribagh Road, Jamtara, Japla, Jasidih, Katrasgarh, Koderma, Kumardhubi, Latehar, Lohardaga, Madhupur, Manoharpur, Muhammadganj, Muri, N.S.C.B. Gomoh, Nagaruntari, Namkom, Orga, Pakur, Parasnath, Piska, Rajkharswan, Rajmahal, Ramgarh Cant, Ranchi, Sahibganj, Shankarpur, Silli, Sini, Tatanagar, Tatisilwai, Vidyasagar |
| 12 | Karnataka | 55 | Almatti, Alnavar, Arsikere, Badami, Bagalkot, Ballari Jn, Bangalore Cantt., Bangarapet Jn, Bantwala, Belagavi, Bidar, Bijapur, Chamarajanagar, Channapatna, Channasandra, Chikkamagaluru, Chitradurga, Davangere, Dharwad, Dodballapura, Gadag Jn, Gangapur, Ghataprabha, Gokak Road, Harihar, Hassan Jn, Hosapete, Kalaburagi, Kengeri, Kopal, Bangalore city , Krishnarajapuram, Malleswaram, Malur, Mandya, Mangalore Central, Mangalore Jn., Munirabad, Mysore, Raichur, Ramanagaram, Ranibennur, Sagar Jambagaru, Sakleshpur, Shahabad, Shivamogga Town, Shree Siddharoodha Swamiji Hubballi Jn, Subrahmanya Road, Talguppa, Tiptur, Tumakuru, Wadi, Whitefield, Yadgir, Yesvantpu Jn |
| 13 | Kerala | 34 | Alappuzha, Angadippuram, Angamali For Kaladi, Chalakudi, Changanassery, Chengannur, Chirayinikil, Ernakulam, Ernakulam Town, Ettumanur, Ferok, Guruvayur, Kannur, Kasargod, Kayankulam, Kollam, Kozhikode, Kuttippuram, Mavelikara, Neyyatinkara, Nilambur Road, Ottappalam, Parappanangadi, Payyanur, Punalur, Shoranur Jn., Thalassery, Thiruvananthapuram, Thrisur, Tirur, Tiruvalla, Tripunithura, Vadakara, Varkala, Wadakancheri |
| 14 | Madhya Pradesh | 80 | Akodia, Amla, Anuppur, Ashoknagar, Balaghat, Banapura, Bargawan, Beohari, Berchha, Betul, Bhind, Bhopal, Bijuri, Bina, Biyavra Rajgarh, Chhindwara, Dabra, Damoh, Datia, Dewas, Gadarwara, Ganjbasoda, Ghoradongri, Guna, Gwalior, Harda, Harpalpur, Hoshangabad, Indore, Itarsi Jn., Jabalpur, Junnor Deo, Kareli, Katni Jn, Katni Murwara, Katni South, Khachrod, Khajuraho, Khandwa, Khirkiya, LaxmiBai Nagar, Maihar, Maksi, Mandlafort, Mandsaur, MCS Chhatarpur, Meghnagar, Morena, Multai, Nagda, Nainpur, Narsinghpur, Neemuch, Nepanagar, Orchha, Pandhurna, Pipariya, Ratlam, Rewa, Ruthiyai, Sanchi, Sant Hirdaram Nagar, Satna, Saugor, Sehore, Seoni, Shahdol, Shajapur, Shamgarh, Sheopur Kalan, Shivpuri, Shridham, Shujalpur, Sihora Road, Singrauli, Tikamgarh, Ujjain, Umaria, Vidisha, Vikramgarhf |
| 15 | Maharashtra | 124 | Ahmednagar, Ajni, Akola, Akurdi, Amalner, Amgaon, Amravati, Andheri, Aurangabad, Badnera, Balharshah, Bandra Terminus, Baramati, Barshi, Belapur, Bhandara Road, Bhokar, Bhusawal, Borivali, Byculla, Chalisgaon, Chanda Fort, Chandrapur, Charni Road, Chhatrapati Shivaji Terminus, Chinchpokli, Chinchwad, Dadar, Daund, Dehu Road, Devlali, Dhamangaon, Dharangaon, Dharmabad, Dhule, Diva, Dudhani, Gangakher, Godhani, Gondia, Grant Road, Hadapsar, Hatkanangale, Hazur Sahib Nanded, Himayatnagar, Hinganghat, Hingoli Deccan, Igatpuri, Itwari, Jalna, Jeur, Jogeshwari, Kalyan, Kamptee, Kanjur Marg, Karad, Katol, Kedgaon, Kinwat, Chhatrapati Shahu Maharaj Terminus, Kopargaon, Kurduwadi, Kurla, Lasalgaon, Latur, Lokmanya Tilak Terminus, Lonand, Lonavla, Lower Parel, Malad, Malkapur, Manmad, Manwath Road, Marine Lines, Matunga, Miraj, Mudkhed, Mumbai Central, Mumbra, Murtizapur, Nagarsol, Nagpur, Nandgaon, Nandura, Narkher, Nashik Road, Osmanabad, Pachora, Pandharpur, Parbhani, Parel, Parli Vaijnath, Partur, Prabhadevi, Pulgaon, Pune, Purna, Raver, Rotegaon, Sainagar Shirdi, Sandhurst Road, Sangli, Satara, Savda, Selu, Sevagram, Shahad, Shegaon, Shivaji Nagar, Solapur, Talegaon, Thakurli, Thane, Titwala, Tumsar Road, Umri, Uruli, Wadala Road, Vidyavihar, Vikhroli, Wadsa, Wardha, Washim, Wathar |
| 16 | Manipur | 1 | Imphal |
| 17 | Meghalaya | 1 | Mehendipathar |
| 18 | Mizoram | 1 | Sairang (Aizawl) |
| 19 | Nagaland | 1 | Dimapur |
| 20 | Odisha | 57 | Angul, Badampahar, Balangir, Balasore, Balugaon, Barbil, Bargarh Road, Baripada, Barpali, Belpahar, Betnoti, Bhadrak, Bhawanipatna, Bhubaneswar, Bimlagarh, Brahmapur, Brajrajnagar, Chatrapur, Cuttack, Damanjodi, Dhenkanal, Gunupur, Harishanker Road, Hirakud, Jajpur-Keonjhar road, Jaleswar, Jaroli, Jeypore, Jharsuguda, Jharsuguda Road, Kantabanji, Kendujhargarh, Kesinga, Khariar Road, Khurda road, Koraput, Lingaraj Temple Road, Mancheswar, Meramandali, Muniguda, New Bhubaneswar, Panposh, Paradeep, Parlakhemundi, Puri, Raghunathpur, Rairakhol, Rairangpur, Rajgangpur, Rayagada, Rourkela, Sakhi Gopal, Sambalpur, Sambalpur city, Talcher, Talcher Road, Titlagarh Jn. |
| 21 | Punjab | 30 | Abohar, Amritsar, Anandpur Sahib railway station, Beas, Bathinda Jn, Dhandari Kalan, Dhuri Jn., Fazilka Jn., Firozpur Cantt, Gurdaspur, Hoshiarpur, Jalandhar Cantt., Jalandhar City, Kapurthala, Kotkapura, Ludhiana, Malerkotla, Mansa, Moga, Muktsar, Nangal Dam, Pathankot Cantt., Pathankot City, Patiala, Phagwara, Phillaur, Rup Nagar, Sangrur, SASN Mohali, Sirhind |
| 22 | Rajasthan | 82 | Abu Road, Ajmer, Alwar, Asalpur Jobner, Balotra, Bandikui, Baran, Barmer, Bayana, Beawar, Bharatpur, Bhawani Mandi, Bhilwara, Bijainagar, Bikaner, Bundi, Chanderiya, Chhabra Gugor, Chittorgarh Jn., Churu, Dakaniya Talav, Dausa, Deeg, Degana, Deshnoke, Dholpur, Didwana, Dungarpur, Falna, Fatehnagar, Fatehpur Shekhawati, Gandhinagar Jaipur, Gangapur City, Gogameri, Gotan, Govind Garh, Hanumangarh, Hindaun City, Jaipur, Jaisalmer, Jalor, Jawai Bandh, Jhalawar City, Jhunjhunu, Jodhpur, Kapasan, Khairthal, Kherli, Kota, Lalgarh, Mandal Garh, Mandawar Mahwa Road, Marwar Bhinmal, Marwar Jn., Mavli Jn., Merta Road, Nagaur, Naraina, Neem ka Thana, Nokha, Pali Marwar, Phalodi, Phulera, Pindwara, Rajgarh, Ramdevra, Ramganj Mandi, Rana Pratapnagar, Rani, Ratangarh, Ren, Ringas, Sadulpur, Sawai Madhopur, Shri Mahaveerji, Sikar, Sojat Road, Somesar, Sri ganganagar, Sujangarh, Suratgarh, Udaipur City |
| 23 | Sikkim | 1 | Rangpo |
| 24 | Tamil Nadu | 73 | Ambasamudram, Ambattur, Arakkonam Jn, Ariyalur, Avadi, Bommidi, Chengalpattu Jn, Chennai Beach, Chennai Egmore, Chennai Park, Chidambaram, Chinna Salem, Coimbatore Jn, Coimbatore North, Coonoor, Dharmapuri, Dr. M.G. Ramachandran Central, Erode Jn., Guduvancheri, Guindy, Gummidipundi, Hosur, Jolarpettai Jn, Kanniyakumari, Karaikkudi, Karur Jn., Katpadi, Kovilpatti, Kulitturai, Kumbakonam, Lalgudi, Madurai Jn, Mambalam, Manaparai, Mannargudi, Mayiladuthurai Jn., Mettupalayam, Morappur, Nagercoil Jn., Namakkal, Palani, Paramakkudi, Perambur, Podanur Jn., Pollachi, Polur, Pudukkottai, Rajapalayam, Ramanathapuram, Rameswaram, Salem, Samalpatti, Sholavandan, Srirangam, Srivilliputtur, St.Thomas Mount, Tambaram, Tenkasi, Thanjavur Jn, Thiruvarur Jn., Tiruchendur, Tirunelveli Jn, Tirupadripulyur, Tirupattur, Tiruppur, Tiruttani, Tiruvallur, Tiruvannamalai, Udagamandalam, Vellore Cantt., Villupuram Jn., Virudhunagar jn, Vriddhachalam Jn. |
| 25 | Telangana | 39 | Adilabad, Basar, Begumpet, Bhadrachalam Road, Gadwal, Hafizpeta, Hi-tech city, Huppuguda, Hyderabad, Jadcherla, Jangaon, Kacheguda, Kamareddi, Karimnagar, Kazipet Jn., Khammam, Lingampalli, Madhira, Mahabubabad, Mahbubnagar, Malakpet, Malkajgiri, Manchiryal, Medchal, Miryalaguda, Nalgonda, Nizamabad Jn, Peddapalli, Ramagundam, Secunderabad, Shadnagar, Sri Bala Brahmeswara Jogulamba Halt, Tandur, Umdanagar, Vikarabad, Warangal, Yadadri, Yakutpura, Zahirabad |
| 26 | Tripura | 4 | Agartala, Dharmanagar, Kumarghat, Udaipur |
| 27 | UT of Chandigarh | 1 | Chandigarh |
| 28 | UT of Jammu & kashmir | 4 | Budgam, Jammu Tawi, Shri Mata Vaishno Devi Katra, Udhampur |
| 29 | UT of Puducherry | 3 | Karaikal, Mahe, Puducherry |
| 30 | Uttar Pradesh | 149 | Achnera, Agra Cantt., Agra Fort, Aishbagh Jn., Akbarpur Jn, Aligarh Jn., Amethi, Amroha, Ayodhya, Azamgarh, Babatpur, Bachhrawan, Badaun, Badshahnagar, Badshahpur, Baheri, Bahraich, Ballia, Balrampur, Banaras, Banda, Barabanki Jn, Bareilly, Bareilly City, Barhni, Basti, Belthara Road, Bhadohi, Bharatkund, Bhatni, Bhuteshwar, Bulandsahar, Chandauli Majhwar, Chandausi, Chilbila, Chitrakut Dham Karwi, Chopan, Chunar Jn., Daliganj, Darshannagar, Deoria Sadar, Dildarnagar, Etawah Jn., Farrukhabad, Fatehabad, Fatehpur, Fatehpur Sikri, Firozabad, Gajraula, Garhmukteshwar, Gauriganj, Ghatampur, Ghaziabad, Ghazipur City, Gola Gokarnath, Gomtinagar, Gonda, Gorakhpur, Govardhan, Govindpuri, Gursahaiganj, Haidergarh, Hapur, Hardoi, Hathras City, Idgah, Izzatnagar, Janghai Jn, Jaunpur City, Jaunpur Jn., Kannauj, Kanpur Anwarganj, Kanpur Bridge Left bank, Kanpur Central, Kaptanganj, Kasganj, Kashi, Khalilabad, Khorason Road, Khurja Jn., Kosi Kalan, Kunda Harnamganj, Lakhimpur, Lalganj, Lalitpur, Lambhua, Lohta, Lucknow (Charbagh), Lucknow city, Maghar, Mahoba, Mailani, Mainpuri Jn., Malhaur, Manaknagar, Manikpur Jn., Mariahu, Mathura, Mau, Meerut City, Mirzapur, Modi Nagar, Mohanlalganj, Moradabad, Nagina, Najibabad Jn., Nihalgarh, Orai, Panki Dham, Phaphamau Jn., Phulpur, Pilibhit, Pokhrayan, MBDD Pratapgarh Jn., Prayag Jn., Prayagraj Jn., Pt. Deen Dayal Upadhyay, Raebareli Jn., Raja Ki Mandi, Ramghat Halt, Rampur, Renukoot, Saharanpur, Saharanpur Jn., Salempur, Seohara, Shahganj Jn., Shahjahanpur, Shamli, Shikohabad Jn., Shivpur, Siddharth nagar, Sitapur Jn., Sonbhadra, Sri Krishna Nagar, Sultanpur Jn., Suraimanpur, Swaminarayan Chappia, Takia, Tulsipur, Tundla Jn., Unchahar, Unnao Jn, Utraitia Jn, Varanasi Jn, Varanasi City, Vindhyachal, Virangana Lakshmibai, Vyasnagar, Zafarabad |
| 31 | Uttarakhand | 11 | Dehradun, Haridwar Jn., Harrawala, Kashipur, Kathgodam, Kichha, Kotdwar, Lalkuan Jn., Ramnagar, Roorkee, Tanakpur |
| 32 | West Bengal | 95 | Adra Jn., Alipurduar Jn. Aluabari Road, Ambika Kalna, Anara, Andal Jn., Andul, Asansol Jn., Azimganj Jn., Bagnan, Bally, Bandel Jn. Bangaon Jn., Bankura Jn., Barabhum, Barasat Jn., Barddhaman Jn. Barrackpore, Belda, Berhampore Court, Bethuadahari, Bhaluka Road, Binnaguri, Bishnupur, Bolpur (Santiniketan), Burnpur, Canning, Chandannagar, Chandpara, Chandrakona Road, Dalgaon, Dalkhola, Dankuni Jn., Dhulian Ganga, Dhupguri, Digha, Dinhata, Dum Dum Jn., Falakata, Garbeta, Gede, Haldia, Haldibari, Harishchandrapur, Hasimara, Hijli, Howrah, Jalpaiguri Jalpaiguri Road , Jangipur Road, Jhalida, Jhargram, Joychandi Pahar, Kaliyaganj, Kalyani Ghoshpara, Kalyani, Kamakhyaguri, Katwa Jn., Khagraghat Road, Kharagpur Jn., Kolkata, Krishnanagar City Jn., Kumedpur, Madhukunda, Madhyamgram, Malda Court, Malda Town, Mecheda, Midnapore, Nabadwip Dham Naihati Jn., New Alipurduar Jn., New Cooch Behar Jn., New Farakka Jn, New Jalpaiguri Jn., New Mal Jn., Panagarh, Pandabeswar, Panskura Jn., Purulia Jn., Rampurhat Jn., Sainthia Jn., Salboni, Samsi, Sealdah, Shalimar, Shantipur Jn., Seoraphuli Jn., Sitarampur, Siuri, Sonarpur Jn., Suisa, Tamluk Jn., Tarakeswar, Tulin, Uluberia |
| Total | 32 | 1275 | |

== Stations under Amrit Bharat Station scheme under Northern Railway ==
The Northern Railway zone has identified 144 stations for redevelopment under the Amrit Bharat Station Scheme, a national initiative aimed at modernising railway infrastructure through long-term master planning. These stations, distributed across the Ambala, Delhi, Firozpur, Lucknow, and Moradabad divisions, encompass a diverse range of facilities, from major primary hubs (NSG1) to smaller regional stations (NSG6). The project is being managed by multiple entities, including the Gati Shakti Units, the Rail Land Development Authority (RLDA), and various departmental Construction Units. Their focus is on enhancing passenger amenities, improving station access, and integrating sustainable infrastructure across the states of Delhi, Punjab, Haryana, Uttar Pradesh, Uttarakhand, Himachal Pradesh, and the Union Territory of Jammu and Kashmir.

| S. No. | Name of Station | State | Division | Category | Executing Agency |
|---|---|---|---|---|---|
| 1 | Abohar (ABS) | Punjab | Ambala | NSG4 | Gati Shakti Unit |
| 2 | Amb Andaura (AADR) | Himachal Pradesh | Ambala | NSG4 | Gati Shakti Unit |
| 3 | Ambala Cantt. Jn. (UMB) | Haryana | Ambala | NSG2 | RLDA |
| 4 | Ambala City (UBC) | Haryana | Ambala | NSG5 | Gati Shakti Unit |
| 5 | Anandpur Sahib (ANSB) | Punjab | Ambala | NSG5 | Gati Shakti Unit |
| 6 | Bathinda Jn. (BTI) | Punjab | Ambala | NSG3 | Construction Unit |
| 7 | Chandigarh (CDG) | Chandigarh | Ambala | NSG2 | RLDA |
| 8 | Dhuri Jn. (DUI) | Punjab | Ambala | NSG5 | Gati Shakti Unit |
| 9 | Kalka (KLK) | Haryana | Ambala | NSG3 | Gati Shakti Unit |
| 10 | Malerkotla (MET) | Punjab | Ambala | NSG5 | Gati Shakti Unit |
| 11 | Nangal Dam (NLDM) | Punjab | Ambala | NSG5 | Gati Shakti Unit |
| 12 | Patiala (PTA) | Punjab | Ambala | NSG4 | Gati Shakti Unit |
| 13 | Roop Nagar (RPAR) | Punjab | Ambala | NSG5 | Gati Shakti Unit |
| 14 | Saharanpur Jn. (SRE) | Uttar Pradesh | Ambala | NSG3 | Gati Shakti Unit |
| 15 | SAS Nagar Mohali (SASN) | Punjab | Ambala | NSG5 | Gati Shakti Unit |
| 16 | Sangrur (SAG) | Punjab | Ambala | NSG5 | Gati Shakti Unit |
| 17 | Shimla (SML) | Himachal Pradesh | Ambala | NSG5 | Gati Shakti Unit |
| 18 | Sirhind Jn. (SIR) | Punjab | Ambala | NSG4 | Gati Shakti Unit |
| 19 | Yamunanagar Jagadhari (YJUD) | Haryana | Ambala | NSG3 | Gati Shakti Unit |
| 20 | Adarsh Nagar Delhi (ANDI) | Delhi | Delhi | NSG5 | Construction Unit |
| 21 | Anand Vihar Terminal (ANVT) | Delhi | Delhi | NSG1 | RLDA |
| 22 | Bahadurgarh (BGZ) | Haryana | Delhi | NSG4 | Gati Shakti Unit |
| 23 | Ballabgarh (BVH) | Haryana | Delhi | NSG5 | Gati Shakti Unit |
| 24 | Bijwasan (BWSN) | Delhi | Delhi | NSG6 | RLDA |
| 25 | Delhi Cantt. (DEC) | Delhi | Delhi | NSG3 | RLDA |
| 26 | Delhi Jn. (DLI) | Delhi | Delhi | NSG1 | RLDA |
| 27 | Delhi-Safdar Jang (DSJ) | Delhi | Delhi | NSG4 | RLDA |
| 28 | Delhi-Sarai Rohilla (DEE) | Delhi | Delhi | NSG2 | Gati Shakti Unit |
| 29 | Delhi-Shahdara Jn. (DSA) | Delhi | Delhi | NSG4 | Construction Unit |
| 30 | Faridabad (FDB) | Haryana | Delhi | NSG3 | Construction Unit |
| 31 | Faridabad New Town (FDN) | Haryana | Delhi | NSG5 | Gati Shakti Unit |
| 32 | Ghaziabad Jn. (GZB) | Uttar Pradesh | Delhi | NSG2 | Construction Unit |
| 33 | Gohana (GHNA) | Haryana | Delhi | NSG6 | Gati Shakti Unit |
| 34 | Gurgaon (GGN) | Haryana | Delhi | NSG3 | RLDA |
| 35 | Hazrat Nizamuddin Jn. (NZM) | Delhi | Delhi | NSG1 | RLDA |
| 36 | Jind Jn. (JIND) | Haryana | Delhi | NSG4 | Gati Shakti Unit |
| 37 | Karnal (KUN) | Haryana | Delhi | NSG3 | Construction Unit |
| 38 | Kurukshetra Jn. (KKDE) | Haryana | Delhi | NSG3 | Construction Unit |
| 39 | Mansa (MSZ) | Punjab | Delhi | NSG5 | Gati Shakti Unit |
| 40 | Meerut City Jn. (MTC) | Uttar Pradesh | Delhi | NSG3 | Construction Unit |
| 41 | Modinagar (MDNR) | Uttar Pradesh | Delhi | NSG4 | Gati Shakti Unit |
| 42 | Muzaffarnagar (MOZ) | Uttar Pradesh | Delhi | NSG3 | Gati Shakti Unit |
| 43 | Narela (NUR) | Delhi | Delhi | NSG4 | Gati Shakti Unit |
| 44 | Narwana Jn. (NRW) | Haryana | Delhi | NSG5 | Gati Shakti Unit |
| 45 | New Delhi (NDLS) | Delhi | Delhi | NSG1 | RLDA |
| 46 | Palwal (PWL) | Haryana | Delhi | NSG4 | Gati Shakti Unit |
| 47 | Panipat Jn. (PNP) | Haryana | Delhi | NSG3 | Construction Unit |
| 48 | Pataudi Road (PTRD) | Haryana | Delhi | NSG5 | Gati Shakti Unit |
| 49 | Rohtak Jn. (ROK) | Haryana | Delhi | NSG3 | Gati Shakti Unit |
| 50 | Shamli (SMQL) | Uttar Pradesh | Delhi | NSG5 | Gati Shakti Unit |
| 51 | Sonipat (SNP) | Haryana | Delhi | NSG3 | Gati Shakti Unit |
| 52 | Subzi Mandi (SZM) | Delhi | Delhi | NSG4 | Gati Shakti Unit |
| 53 | Tilak Bridge (TKJ) | Delhi | Delhi | NSG6 | Gati Shakti Unit |
| 54 | Amritsar Jn. (ASR) | Punjab | Firozpur | NSG2 | Construction Unit |
| 55 | Beas JN (BEAS) | Punjab | Firozpur | NSG3 | Construction Unit |
| 56 | Dhandari Kalan (DDL) | Punjab | Firozpur | NSG4 | Gati Shakti Unit |
| 57 | Fazilka Jn. (FKA) | Punjab | Firozpur | NSG5 | Gati Shakti Unit |
| 58 | Firozpur Cantt. Jn. (FZR) | Punjab | Firozpur | NSG3 | Gati Shakti Unit |
| 59 | Hoshiarpur (HSX) | Punjab | Firozpur | NSG5 | Gati Shakti Unit |
| 60 | Jalandhar Cantt. Jn. (JRC) | Punjab | Firozpur | NSG3 | Construction Unit |
| 61 | Jalandhar City Jn. (JUC) | Punjab | Firozpur | NSG2 | Construction Unit |
| 62 | Kapurthala (KXH) | Punjab | Firozpur | NSG5 | Gati Shakti Unit |
| 63 | Kot Kapura Jn. (KKP) | Punjab | Firozpur | NSG5 | Gati Shakti Unit |
| 64 | Ludhiana Jn. (LDH) | Punjab | Firozpur | NSG2 | Construction Unit |
| 65 | Moga (MOGA) | Punjab | Firozpur | NSG5 | Gati Shakti Unit |
| 66 | Muktsar (MKS) | Punjab | Firozpur | NSG5 | Gati Shakti Unit |
| 67 | Phagwara Jn. (PGW) | Punjab | Firozpur | NSG3 | Gati Shakti Unit |
| 68 | Phillaur Jn. (PHR) | Punjab | Firozpur | NSG4 | Gati Shakti Unit |
| 69 | Baijnath Paprola (BJPL) | Himachal Pradesh | Jammu | NSG6 | Gati Shakti Unit |
| 70 | Budgam (BDGM) | Jammu and Kashmir | Jammu | NSG6 | Gati Shakti Unit |
| 71 | Gurdaspur (GSP) | Punjab | Jammu | NSG5 | Gati Shakti Unit |
| 72 | Jammu Tawi (JAT) | Jammu and Kashmir | Jammu | NSG2 | Construction Unit |
| 73 | MCT Mahajan (MCTM) | Jammu and Kashmir | Jammu | NSG3 | Gati Shakti Unit |
| 74 | Palampur Himachal (PLMX) | Himachal Pradesh | Jammu | NSG4 | Construction Unit |
| 75 | Pathankot Cantt (PTKC) | Punjab | Jammu | NSG3 | Construction Unit |
| 76 | Pathankot Jn. (PTK) | Punjab | Jammu | NSG4 | Gati Shakti Unit |
| 77 | SMVD Katra (SVDK) | Jammu and Kashmir | Jammu | NSG2 | Gati Shakti Unit |
| 78 | Akbarpur Jn. (ABP) | Uttar Pradesh | Lucknow | NSG3 | Gati Shakti Unit |
| 79 | Amethi (AME) | Uttar Pradesh | Lucknow | NSG4 | Gati Shakti Unit |
| 80 | Ayodhya Dham Jn. (AY) | Uttar Pradesh | Lucknow | NSG3 | Construction Unit |
| 81 | Babatpur (BTP) | Uttar Pradesh | Lucknow | NSG6 | Gati Shakti Unit |
| 82 | Bachhrawn (BCN) | Uttar Pradesh | Lucknow | NSG5 | Gati Shakti Unit |
| 83 | Badshahpur (BSE) | Uttar Pradesh | Lucknow | NSG5 | Gati Shakti Unit |
| 84 | Bara Banki Jn. (BBK) | Uttar Pradesh | Lucknow | NSG3 | Gati Shakti Unit |
| 85 | Bhadohi (BOY) | Uttar Pradesh | Lucknow | NSG3 | Gati Shakti Unit |
| 86 | Bharatkund (BTKD) | Uttar Pradesh | Lucknow | NSG6 | Gati Shakti Unit |
| 87 | Chilbila Jn. (CIL) | Uttar Pradesh | Lucknow | NSG6 | Gati Shakti Unit |
| 88 | Darshannagar (DRG) | Uttar Pradesh | Lucknow | NSG6 | Gati Shakti Unit |
| 89 | Gauriganj (GNG) | Uttar Pradesh | Lucknow | NSG5 | Gati Shakti Unit |
| 90 | Haidergarh (HGH) | Uttar Pradesh | Lucknow | NSG6 | Gati Shakti Unit |
| 91 | Janghai Jn. (JNH) | Uttar Pradesh | Lucknow | NSG3 | Gati Shakti Unit |
| 92 | Jaunpur City (JOP) | Uttar Pradesh | Lucknow | NSG4 | Gati Shakti Unit |
| 93 | Jaunpur Jn. (JNU) | Uttar Pradesh | Lucknow | NSG3 | Gati Shakti Unit |
| 94 | Kanpur Bridge (RB) (CPB) | Uttar Pradesh | Lucknow | NSG6 | Gati Shakti Unit |
| 95 | Kashi (KEI) | Uttar Pradesh | Lucknow | NSG5 | Construction Unit |
| 96 | Kunda Harnamganj (KHNM) | Uttar Pradesh | Lucknow | NSG5 | Gati Shakti Unit |
| 97 | Lalganj (LLJ) | Uttar Pradesh | Lucknow | NSG5 | Gati Shakti Unit |
| 98 | Lambhua (LBA) | Uttar Pradesh | Lucknow | NSG5 | Gati Shakti Unit |
| 99 | Lohta (LOT) | Uttar Pradesh | Lucknow | NSG6 | Gati Shakti Unit |
| 100 | Lucknow Jn. (LKO) | Uttar Pradesh | Lucknow | NSG2 | RLDA |
| 101 | MBDD Pratapgarh Jn. (MBDP) | Uttar Pradesh | Lucknow | NSG3 | Gati Shakti Unit |
| 102 | Maharaja Bijli Pasi (MBLP) | Uttar Pradesh | Lucknow | NSG4 | Gati Shakti Unit |
| 103 | Malhour (ML) | Uttar Pradesh | Lucknow | NSG6 | Gati Shakti Unit |
| 104 | Manak Nagar (MKG) | Uttar Pradesh | Lucknow | NSG6 | Gati Shakti Unit |
| 105 | Mariahu (MAY) | Uttar Pradesh | Lucknow | NSG5 | Gati Shakti Unit |
| 106 | Mohanlalganj (MLJ) | Uttar Pradesh | Lucknow | NSG6 | Gati Shakti Unit |
| 107 | Phaphamau Jn. (PFM) | Uttar Pradesh | Lucknow | NSG5 | Division (Open Line) Unit |
| 108 | Phulpur (PLP) | Uttar Pradesh | Lucknow | NSG5 | Gati Shakti Unit |
| 109 | Prayag Jn. (PRG) | Uttar Pradesh | Lucknow | NSG4 | Division (Open Line) Unit |
| 110 | Rae Bareli Jn. (RBL) | Uttar Pradesh | Lucknow | NSG3 | Gati Shakti Unit |
| 111 | Shahganj Jn. (SHG) | Uttar Pradesh | Lucknow | NSG3 | Gati Shakti Unit |
| 112 | Shiupur (SOP) | Uttar Pradesh | Lucknow | NSG6 | Gati Shakti Unit |
| 113 | Sri Krishna Nagar (SKN) | Uttar Pradesh | Lucknow | NSG5 | Gati Shakti Unit |
| 114 | Sultanpur Jn. (SLN) | Uttar Pradesh | Lucknow | NSG3 | Gati Shakti Unit |
| 115 | Takia (TQA) | Uttar Pradesh | Lucknow | NSG5 | Gati Shakti Unit |
| 116 | Unchahar Jn. (UCR) | Uttar Pradesh | Lucknow | NSG5 | Gati Shakti Unit |
| 117 | Unnao Jn. (ON) | Uttar Pradesh | Lucknow | NSG3 | Gati Shakti Unit |
| 118 | Utraitia Jn. (UTR) | Uttar Pradesh | Lucknow | NSG6 | Gati Shakti Unit |
| 119 | Varanasi Jn. (BSB) | Uttar Pradesh | Lucknow | NSG1 | Construction Unit |
| 120 | Vyasanagar (VYN) | Uttar Pradesh | Lucknow | NSG6 | Gati Shakti Unit |
| 121 | Zafarabad Jn. (ZBD) | Uttar Pradesh | Lucknow | NSG5 | Gati Shakti Unit |
| 122 | Amroha (AMRO) | Uttar Pradesh | Moradabad | NSG5 | Gati Shakti Unit |
| 123 | Aonla (AO) | Uttar Pradesh | Moradabad | NSG5 | Gati Shakti Unit |
| 124 | Balamau Jn. (BLM) | Uttar Pradesh | Moradabad | NSG5 | Gati Shakti Unit |
| 125 | Bareilly Jn. (BE) | Uttar Pradesh | Moradabad | NSG2 | Construction Unit |
| 126 | Bijnor (BJO) | Uttar Pradesh | Moradabad | NSG5 | Division (Open Line) Unit |
| 127 | Bulandshahr (BSC) | Uttar Pradesh | Moradabad | NSG5 | Gati Shakti Unit |
| 128 | Chandausi Jn. (CH) | Uttar Pradesh | Moradabad | NSG4 | Gati Shakti Unit |
| 129 | Dehra Dun (DDN) | Uttarakhand | Moradabad | NSG2 | Gati Shakti Unit |
| 130 | Dhampur (DPR) | Uttar Pradesh | Moradabad | NSG5 | Division (Open Line) Unit |
| 131 | Gajraula Jn. (GJL) | Uttar Pradesh | Moradabad | NSG5 | Gati Shakti Unit |
| 132 | Garhmuktesar (GMS) | Uttar Pradesh | Moradabad | NSG5 | Gati Shakti Unit |
| 133 | Hapur Jn. (HPU) | Uttar Pradesh | Moradabad | NSG4 | Gati Shakti Unit |
| 134 | Hardoi (HRI) | Uttar Pradesh | Moradabad | NSG3 | Gati Shakti Unit |
| 135 | Haridwar Jn. (HW) | Uttarakhand | Moradabad | NSG2 | Gati Shakti Unit |
| 136 | Harrawala (HRW) | Uttarakhand | Moradabad | NSG6 | Gati Shakti Unit |
| 137 | Kotdwara (KTW) | Uttarakhand | Moradabad | NSG5 | Gati Shakti Unit |
| 138 | Moradabad Jn. (MB) | Uttar Pradesh | Moradabad | NSG2 | Construction Unit |
| 139 | Nagina (NGG) | Uttar Pradesh | Moradabad | NSG5 | Gati Shakti Unit |
| 140 | Najibabad Jn. (NBD) | Uttar Pradesh | Moradabad | NSG4 | Gati Shakti Unit |
| 141 | Rampur (RMU) | Uttar Pradesh | Moradabad | NSG3 | Gati Shakti Unit |
| 142 | Roorkee (RK) | Uttarakhand | Moradabad | NSG3 | Gati Shakti Unit |
| 143 | Seohara (SEO) | Uttar Pradesh | Moradabad | NSG5 | Gati Shakti Unit |
| 144 | Shahjahanpur Jn. (SPN) | Uttar Pradesh | Moradabad | NSG3 | Gati Shakti Unit |

== Timeline of events ==
- February 2023 - project was introduced.
- 24 September 2023 - phase 1 started.
- Autumn 2023 - work began in a phased manner.
- 22 May 2025 - Prime Minister Narendra Modi virtually inaugurated the first major phase of completed redevelopments under the scheme, dedicating 103 railway stations across 18 states and Union Territories. The phase incurred a combined upgrade capital cost exceeding ₹1,100 crore across 86 districts.

The redevelopment structural integrations matched regional heritage, such as Kakatiya empire motifs for Begumpet and traditional temple-style arches for Deshnoke.

| S. No. | Station Name | Railway Zone | State / Union Territory | Architectural Theme / Core Features Added |
|---|---|---|---|---|
| 1 | Parel | Central Railway | Maharashtra | Modernised suburban terminal, multi-modal access hub. |
| 2 | Matunga | Central Railway | Maharashtra | All-women operational upgrades, green vertical walls. |
| 3 | Chinchpokli | Central Railway | Maharashtra | Congestion-free entries, tactile paths for Divyangjan. |
| 4 | Vadala Road | Central Railway | Maharashtra | Multi-tier platform accessibility improvements. |
| 5 | Shahad | Central Railway | Maharashtra | New booking offices, executive waiting zones. |
| 6 | Lonand | Central Railway | Maharashtra | Expanded parking circulation, LED digital route guidance. |
| 7 | Kedgaon | Central Railway | Maharashtra | Structural facelift, integrated solar rooftop power. |
| 8 | Lasalgaon | Central Railway | Maharashtra | Heavy-duty passenger shelter improvements. |
| 9 | Murtizapur Junction | Central Railway | Maharashtra | Modernized foot overbridges (FOBs). |
| 10 | Devlali | Central Railway | Maharashtra | Military cantonment aesthetic, high-capacity lounges. |
| 11 | Dhule | Central Railway | Maharashtra | Upgraded high-mast lighting and structural approach roads. |
| 12 | Savda | Central Railway | Maharashtra | Upgraded freight-passenger multi-utility circulation space. |
| 13 | Chanda Fort | Central Railway | Maharashtra | Local tribal artwork displays and heritage facade. |
| 14 | NSCB Itwari Junction | Central Railway | Maharashtra | Complete platform re-surfacing, high-speed public Wi-Fi. |
| 15 | Amgaon | Central Railway | Maharashtra | Standardized low-height ramps and clean drinking water booths. |
| 16 | Deshnoke | North Western Railway | Rajasthan | Traditional architecture inspired by Karni Mata Temple. |
| 17 | Fatehpur Shekhawati | North Western Railway | Rajasthan | Shekhawati haveli motifs and fresco facade elements. |
| 18 | Rajgarh | North Western Railway | Rajasthan | Local historic stone cladding and tourist information panels. |
| 19 | Govind Garh | North Western Railway | Rajasthan | Restructured approach gates and local art installations. |
| 20 | Gogameri | North Western Railway | Rajasthan | Pilgrim holding areas and expanded executive restrooms. |
| 21 | Mandawar Mahuwa Road | North Western Railway | Rajasthan | Upgraded commercial kiosk zones and roof plazas. |
| 22 | Bundi | North Western Railway | Rajasthan | Stepwell-inspired architecture, heritage structural arches. |
| 23 | Mandalgarh | North Western Railway | Rajasthan | Grandeur of Rajput tradition motifs and historical murals. |
| 24 | Gadag | South Western Railway | Karnataka | Modern city plaza integration, executive business lounges. |
| 25 | Dharwad | South Western Railway | Karnataka | High-speed elevators, upgraded aesthetic circulation zones. |
| 26 | Bagalkot | South Western Railway | Karnataka | Redesigned station building, eco-friendly water collection. |
| 27 | Munirabad | South Western Railway | Karnataka | Architectural elements honoring the nearby UNESCO site Hampi. |
| 28 | Gokak Road | South Western Railway | Karnataka | Heavy-duty passenger waiting hall expansions. |
| 29 | Samakhiali | Western Railway | Gujarat | Industrial corridor design, smart ticketing networks. |
| 30 | Morbi | Western Railway | Gujarat | Heritage roof structure restorations, modern executive rooms. |
| 31 | Hapa | Western Railway | Gujarat | Upgraded terminal accessibility features for Divyangjan. |
| 32 | Jam Wanthali | Western Railway | Gujarat | Energy-efficient LED fittings, updated platforms. |
| 33 | Kanalus Junction | Western Railway | Gujarat | Multi-track crossover bridge upgrades. |
| 34 | Okha | Western Railway | Gujarat | Marine-themed coastal exterior design. |
| 35 | Mithapur | Western Railway | Gujarat | Eco-conscious urban plazas and rooftop garden areas. |
| 36 | Rajula Junction | Western Railway | Gujarat | Redesigned traffic circulation loops outside entrance. |
| 37 | Sihor Junction | Western Railway | Gujarat | Upgraded waiting rooms and digitized display boards. |
| 38 | Palitana | Western Railway | Gujarat | Jain temple structural architecture motifs. |
| 39 | Mahuva | Western Railway | Gujarat | Coastal tourism infrastructure integration. |
| 40 | Jam Jodhpur | Western Railway | Gujarat | Localized clay work features, solar lighting grids. |
| 41 | Limbdi | Western Railway | Gujarat | Modern ticketing facades, expanded platform sheds. |
| 42 | Derol | Western Railway | Gujarat | Clean landscape layout, heavy passenger lounges. |
| 43 | Karamsad | Western Railway | Gujarat | Heritage galleries dedicated to Sardar Vallabhbhai Patel. |
| 44 | Utran | Western Railway | Gujarat | Enhanced high-mast safety lighting fixtures. |
| 45 | Kosamba Junction | Western Railway | Gujarat | Modernized commercial and parcel booking offices. |
| 46 | Dakor | Western Railway | Gujarat | Spiritual architecture themed after Ranchhodrai Ji Maharaj. |
| 47 | Thawe | North Eastern Railway | Bihar | Murals representing Maa Thawewali and Madhubani paintings. |
| 48 | Begumpet | South Central Railway | Telangana | Architectural legacy of the Kakatiya dynasty; all-women crew terminal. |
| 49 | Karimnagar | South Central Railway | Telangana | Modern facade, localized stone craft installations. |
| 50 | Warangal | South Central Railway | Telangana | Smart executive holding areas, cultural artwork displays. |
| 51 | Mandi Dabwali | Northern Railway | Haryana | Complete green terminal landscaping, solar sub-grids. |
| 52 | Baijnath Paprola | Northern Railway | Himachal Pradesh | Mountain resort design, severe-weather shelter systems. |
| 53 | Sankarpur | Eastern Railway | Jharkhand | Modernized platform accessibility stairs and ramps. |
| 54 | Rajmahal | Eastern Railway | Jharkhand | Historical stone facade restorations. |
| 55 | Govindpur Road | South Eastern Railway | Jharkhand | Industrial-grade heavy commuters platform extensions. |
| 56 | Vadakara | Southern Railway | Kerala | Clean energy infrastructure, modern coastal entry portals. |
| 57 | Chirayinkeezh | Southern Railway | Kerala | Multi-modal transport auto-taxi bay alignments. |
| 58 | Shajapur | Western Railway | Madhya Pradesh | Localized handicraft display panels, roof plazas. |
| 75 | Aligarh Junction | North Central Railway | Uttar Pradesh | Modernised facade, expanded platform shelters, high-speed public Wi-Fi. |
| 76 | Phaphund | North Central Railway | Uttar Pradesh | Enhanced waiting rooms and upgraded circulating area. |
| 77 | Pilibhit Junction | North Eastern Railway | Uttar Pradesh | Eco-friendly waste systems and regional heritage murals. |
| 78 | Lakhimpur | North Eastern Railway | Uttar Pradesh | Integrated solar roofing and tactile paths for Divyangjan. |
| 79 | Seohara | Northern Railway | Uttar Pradesh | Completely revamped booking gates and modern water booths. |
| 80 | Dhampur | Northern Railway | Uttar Pradesh | Expanded executive holding lounge facilities. |
| 81 | Raja Ki Mandi | North Central Railway | Uttar Pradesh | Smart city plaza connection and digital route displays. |
| 82 | Idgah Agra | North Central Railway | Uttar Pradesh | Upgraded facade matching local architectural aesthetics. |
| 83 | Firozabad | North Central Railway | Uttar Pradesh | Glass industry themed interiors and expanded platform sheds. |
| 84 | Mainpuri Junction | North Central Railway | Uttar Pradesh | High-mast safety lighting and pedestrian traffic loop redesign. |
| 85 | Kasganj Junction | North Eastern Railway | Uttar Pradesh | Modern parcel and commercial kiosk zones. |
| 86 | Gonda Junction | North Eastern Railway | Uttar Pradesh | High-density passenger handling infrastructure expansion. |
| 87 | Basti | North Eastern Railway | Uttar Pradesh | New multi-tier platform accessibility walkways. |
| 88 | Khalilabad | North Eastern Railway | Uttar Pradesh | Upgraded ticketing facades and modern executive restrooms. |
| 89 | Siddharthnagar | North Eastern Railway | Uttar Pradesh | Heritage artwork installations honoring regional history. |
| 90 | Anand Nagar Junction | North Eastern Railway | Uttar Pradesh | Reinforced structural supports and new seating lounges. |
| 91 | Barabanki Junction | North Eastern Railway | Uttar Pradesh | Complete platform re-surfacing and advanced public address network. |
| 92 | Subedarganj | North Central Railway | Uttar Pradesh | Expanded commuter waiting halls for high traffic management. |
| 93 | Prayagraj Rambagh | North Eastern Railway | Uttar Pradesh | Spiritual architectural motifs matching pilgrim movement infrastructure. |
| 94 | Anand | Western Railway | Gujarat | Milk revolution heritage gallery integration and high-speed lifts. |
| 95 | Nadiad Junction | Western Railway | Gujarat | Multimodal auto-taxi lane integration outside main entrance. |
| 96 | Ankleshwar Junction | Western Railway | Gujarat | Industrial-grade heavy commuter footbridges. |
| 97 | Bharuch Junction | Western Railway | Gujarat | Modernised concourse, smart ticketing networks, executive lounges. |
| 98 | Sullurupeta | Southern Railway | Andhra Pradesh | ISRO space-theme murals and rocket launch display gallery. |
| 99 | Bhilai Power House | South East Central Railway | Chhattisgarh | Industrial steel city design integration and roof plazas. |
| 100 | Tilda Newra | South East Central Railway | Chhattisgarh | Uniform standards of Divyangjan accessibility ramps. |
| 101 | Bhatapara | South East Central Railway | Chhattisgarh | Upgraded water supply grids and illuminated approach ways. |
| 102 | Champa Junction | South East Central Railway | Chhattisgarh | Redesigned parking circulation and expanded waiting zones. |
| 103 | Raigarh | South East Central Railway | Chhattisgarh | Modernised executive business lounges and green wall panels. |
| — | Total: 103 Stations | Across 18 States | Pan-India Network | Total investment outlay exceeding Over ₹1,100 crore. |

- 17 July 2026- These stations are reopened:

| Station Name | Station Code | State | Railway Zone |
|---|---|---|---|
| Jalandhar Cantt | JRC | Punjab | Northern Railway |
| S.A.S. Nagar (Mohali) | SASN | Punjab | Northern Railway |
| Vidisha | BHS | Madhya Pradesh | West Central Railway |
| Sanchi | SCI | Madhya Pradesh | West Central Railway |
| Ashoknagar | ASKN | Madhya Pradesh | West Central Railway |
| Shivpuri | SVPI | Madhya Pradesh | West Central Railway |
| Beohari | BEHR | Madhya Pradesh | West Central Railway |
| Bhind | BIX | Madhya Pradesh | North Central Railway |
| Harpalpur | HPP | Madhya Pradesh | North Central Railway |
| Chhatarpur | MCSC | Madhya Pradesh | North Central Railway |
| Tikamgarh | TKMG | Madhya Pradesh | North Central Railway |
| Junnor Deo | JNO | Madhya Pradesh | Central Railway |
| Balaghat | BTC | Madhya Pradesh | South East Central Railway |
| Chhindwara | CWA | Madhya Pradesh | South East Central Railway |
| Nainpur | NIR | Madhya Pradesh | South East Central Railway |
| Barmer | BME | Rajasthan | North Western Railway |
| Dausa | DO | Rajasthan | North Western Railway |
| BRMT | BRMT | Maharashtra | Central Railway |
| Nandura | NN | Maharashtra | Central Railway |
| Aishbagh Junction | ASH | Uttar Pradesh | North Eastern Railway |
| Harrawala | HRW | Uttarakhand | Northern Railway |
| Balangir | BLGR | Odisha | East Coast Railway |
| Barpali | BRPL | Odisha | East Coast Railway |
| Paralakhemundi | PLH | Odisha | East Coast Railway |
| Talcher | TLHR | Odisha | East Coast Railway |
| Kesinga | KSNG | Odisha | East Coast Railway |
| Baripada | BPO | Odisha | East Coast Railway |
| Bimalgarh | BUF | Odisha | East Coast Railway |
| Majbat | MJBT | Assam | Northeast Frontier Railway |
| Alnavar | LWR | Karnataka | South Western Railway |
| Badami | BDM | Karnataka | South Western Railway |
| Bantwal | BNTL | Karnataka | South Western Railway |
| Koppal | KBL | Karnataka | South Western Railway |
| Cumbum | CBM | Andhra Pradesh | South Central Railway |
| Mangalagiri | MAG | Andhra Pradesh | South Central Railway |
| Rayanapadu | RYP | Andhra Pradesh | South Central Railway |
| Chennai Park | MSF | Tamil Nadu | Southern Railway |
| Coonoor | ONR | Tamil Nadu | Southern Railway |
| Hi-Tech City | HTCY | Telangana | South Central Railway |
| Modi Nagar | MDNR | Delhi / UP NCR | Northern Railway |
| Tirur | TIR | Kerala | Southern Railway |
| Thalassery | TLY | Kerala | Southern Railway |
| Parappanangadi | PGI | Kerala | Southern Railway |
| Nilambur Road | NIL | Kerala | Southern Railway |
| Chalakudy | CKI | Kerala | Southern Railway |
| Angamaly for Kalady | AFK | Kerala | Southern Railway |

=== December 2026 planned completions ===
Under the long-term master planning phases of the scheme, the Ministry of Railways designated December 2026 as the macro-completion milestone to bring the total number of redeveloped stations to over 400 across India.

The following table lists all major stations with active infrastructure schedules officially targeted for operational handover and completion by December 2026:

| S. No. | Station Name | Railway Zone | State / Union Territory | Target Date / Window | Infrastructure Status & Planned Upgrades |
|---|---|---|---|---|---|
| 1 | Secunderabad | South Central Railway | Telangana | 31 December 2026 | Flagship ₹719 crore mega overhaul. South-side building structural frame near completion; sky concourse, multi-level parking, and north-side structural foundation crossing a 64% completion baseline. |
| 2 | Chandigarh | Northern Railway | Chandigarh | 31 December 2026 | Cross-track modular air-concourse installation. Final structural column works underway to connect the commercial plaza and multi-modal transit links. |
| 3 | Ludhiana Junction | Northern Railway | Punjab | December 2026 | ₹528.95 crore "mini smart city" project. Elevated highway entry loops, heavy steel frame structures for the main building facade, and platform extensions actively under construction. |
| 4 | Abohar | Northern Railway | Punjab | December 2026 | Main structural building envelope finalized; installation of 12-meter wide foot overbridges (FOBs), hydraulic lifts, and tactile flooring for accessibility. |
| 5 | Surat | Western Railway | Gujarat | December 2026 | Multi-modal transport hub (MMTH) integration phase. Concourse slab casting finalized; structural connections to the upcoming high-speed rail terminal entering finish work. |
| 6 | Mangaluru Junction | Southern Railway | Karnataka | December 2026 | Part of the remaining Karnataka phase updates. Structural road widening for double-loop entry and heavy shelter canopy fabrication over platforms 2 and 3. |
| 7 | Bijwasan | Northern Railway | Delhi | December 2026 | Megacity terminal expansion featuring 8 platforms and 12 tracks. Mega roof plaza infrastructure and direct links to city suburban routes. |
| 8 | Faridabad | Northern Railway | Haryana | December 2026 | Construction of two iconic multi-storey station buildings with iconic steel facades, connecting iconic city footbridges over high-frequency tracks. |
| 9 | Gwalior Junction | North Central Railway | Madhya Pradesh | December 2026 | Heritage design restoration mixed with modern infrastructure, spanning a 40,000 sq meter development envelope with new roof plazas. |
| 10 | Ghaziabad Junction | Northern Railway | Uttar Pradesh | December 2026 | Total restructuring of tracking yards, new administrative blocks, multistoried parking towers, and separate entry/exit lines to prevent city commuter locks. |

== History ==
- Indian Railway Ministry introduced the Amrit Bharat station scheme (ABSS) in the Railway Budget 2023-24.
- On 22 May 2025, 103 Amrit Bharat railway stations across 18 Indian states. The stations were redeveloped at a cost of over ₹1,100 crore, with the largest numbers in Uttar Pradesh (19), Gujarat (18), Maharashtra (15), Tamil Nadu (9), Rajasthan (8), Madhya Pradesh (6), Chhattisgarh and Karnataka (5 each), Jharkhand, Telangana and West Bengal (3 each), Bihar and Kerala (2 each), and Andhra Pradesh, Assam, Haryana, Himachal Pradesh and Puducherry (1 each).
- On 18 July 2026, 75 additional Amrit Bharat railway stations across 20 states were inaugurated. Redeveloped at a combined cost of ₹1,570 crore. The stations were distributed across Madhya Pradesh (13), Rajasthan (8), Odisha and Uttar Pradesh (7 each), Kerala (6), Gujarat, Karnataka and Punjab (4 each), Andhra Pradesh, Chhattisgarh and Tamil Nadu (3 each), Haryana, Jharkhand, Maharashtra and West Bengal (2 each), and Assam, Bihar, Himachal Pradesh, Telangana and Uttarakhand (1 each).

== See also ==
- Transport in India
- Rail transport in India
- RapidX
- PM Gati Shakti
