= Dhinda railway station =

Railway station in Rajasthan, India

Dhinda

General information
- Location: Dhinda, Jaipur district, Rajasthan; India
- Coordinates: 26°53′27″N 75°21′40″E
- Elevation: 386 metres (1,266 ft)
- System: Indian Railways station
- Owner: Indian Railways
- Operator: North Western Railway
- Line: Ahmedabad–Jaipur line
- Platforms: 2
- Tracks: Double Electric-Line

Construction
- Structure type: Standard (on ground)

Other information
- Status: Functioning
- Station code: DHND
- Zone(s): North Western Railway zone
- Division(s): Jaipur

Services
| Preceding station | Indian Railways | Following station |
|---|---|---|
| Asalpur Jobner towards ? | North Western Railway zone Ahmedabad–Jaipur line | Hirnoda towards ? |
Location
- Interactive map

Bobas railway station is a railway station in located on Ahmedabad–Jaipur railway line operated by the North Western Railway under Jaipur railway division. It is situated at Dhinda in Jaipur district in the Indian state of Rajasthan.
