= Grant Road =

Grant Road may refer to:

- Grant Road (South Mumbai, India)
- Grant Road (Los Alamos, New Mexico)
- Grant Road Historic District
- Grant Road railway station
- Grant Road metro station
- Grant Road Reserve
