= JDH =

JDH may refer to:

- JDH, the IATA code for Jodhpur Airport, Rajasthan, India
- JDH, the Indian Railways station code for Jam Jodhpur railway station, Gujarat, India
- JD Health, the healthcare unit of the JD.com
