= Ib railway station =

Railway station in Odisha, India

Ib

General information
- Location: Ib, Odisha; India
- Coordinates: 21°49′01″N 83°56′56″E
- Elevation: 207 m (679 ft)
- System: Indian Railways station
- Line: Tatanagar–Bilaspur section of Howrah–Nagpur–Mumbai line
- Platforms: 2
- Tracks: 5 ft 6 in (1,676 mm) broad gauge

Construction
- Structure type: Standard (on ground station)
- Parking: Available

Other information
- Status: Functioning
- Station code: IB
- Zone(s): South East Central Railway
- Division(s): Bilaspur

History
- Opened: 1891
- Electrified: 1969–70
- Former names: Bengal Nagpur Railway
Location
- Location within Odisha Location within India

Ib is a railway station in the Indian state of Odisha. It has the distinction of having the shortest name of all stations on the Indian Railways system.

== Etymology ==
The station derives its name from the nearby Ib River.

== History ==
Ib railway station started with the opening of the Nagpur–Asansol main line of Bengal Nagpur Railway in 1891. It became a station on the Howrah–Nagpur–Mumbai line in 1900.

=== Coalfield ===
In 1900, when Bengal Nagpur Railway was building a bridge across the Ib River, coal was accidentally discovered in what later became Ib Valley Coalfield.

== See also ==
- Puratchi Thalaivar Dr. M.G. Ramachandran Central railway station – the station with the longest name on Indian Railways.

Preceding station	Indian Railways	Following station
Jharsuguda towards ?	South Eastern Railway zone Tatanagar–Bilaspur section of Howrah–Nagpur–Mumbai line	Brajrajnagar towards ?
