= Hirnoda railway station =

Railway station in Rajasthan, India

Hirnoda

General information
- Location: Hirnoda, Jaipur Gramin district, Rajasthan; India
- Coordinates: 26°53′07″N 75°19′39″E
- Elevation: 398 metres (1,306 ft)
- System: Indian Railways station
- Owner: Indian Railways
- Operator: North Western Railway
- Line: Ahmedabad–Jaipur line
- Platforms: 2
- Tracks: Double Electric-Line

Construction
- Structure type: Standard (on ground)

Other information
- Status: Functioning
- Station code: HDA
- Zone(s): North Western Railway zone
- Division(s): Jaipur

Services
Preceding station	Indian Railways	Following station
Dhinda towards ?	North Western Railway zone Ahmedabad–Jaipur line	Phulera Junction towards ?
Location
- Interactive map

Hirnoda railway station is a railway station in located on Ahmedabad–Jaipur railway line operated by the North Western Railway under Jaipur railway division. It is situated at Hirnoda in Jaipur Gramin district in the Indian state of Rajasthan.
