= Jam Jodhpur =

- city
- Location in Gujarat, India Jam Jodhpur (India)
- Coordinates: 21.88°N 70.03°E
- Country: India
- State: Gujarat
- District: Jamnagar

Population (2011)
  - Total: 25,892

Languages
  - Official: Gujarati, Hindi
- Time zone: UTC+5:30 (IST)
- Postal code: 360530
- Telephone code: 02898
- Vehicle registration: GJ 10
- Website: gujaratindia.com

Jam Jodhpur is a city and a municipality in Jamnagar district in the Indian state of Gujarat.

== Demographics ==
As of 2001 India census, Jam Jodhpur had a population of 22,651. Males constitute of 51% of the population and females 49%. Jam Jodhpur has an average literacy rate of 72%, higher than the national average of 59.5%: male literacy is 77%, and female literacy is 67%. In Jam Jodhpur, 11% of the population is under 6 years of age. Jam Jodhpur is one of the richest towns in Gujarat. The reason behind this is that most of the people are having good farms and due to good water supply they are cultivating more and earning more.

== Transport ==
Jam Jodhpur is connected by road to the rest of India as well as by railways. State Highway No. 126 pass through city which connects Bhanvad to National Highway No. 8B. Jam Jodhpur railway station is small railway station in the city and Express trains like Porbandar - Santragachi Kavi Guru SF Express, Rajkot-Porbandar Express and Porbandar Somnath Passenger stops.

== Notable person ==
Kumar Sri Sir Ranjitsinhji Vibhaji II was born in Sadodar(small village of Jamjodhpur).
