= Hafizpet railway station =

Railway station in Hyderabad, Telangana, India

Hafizpet
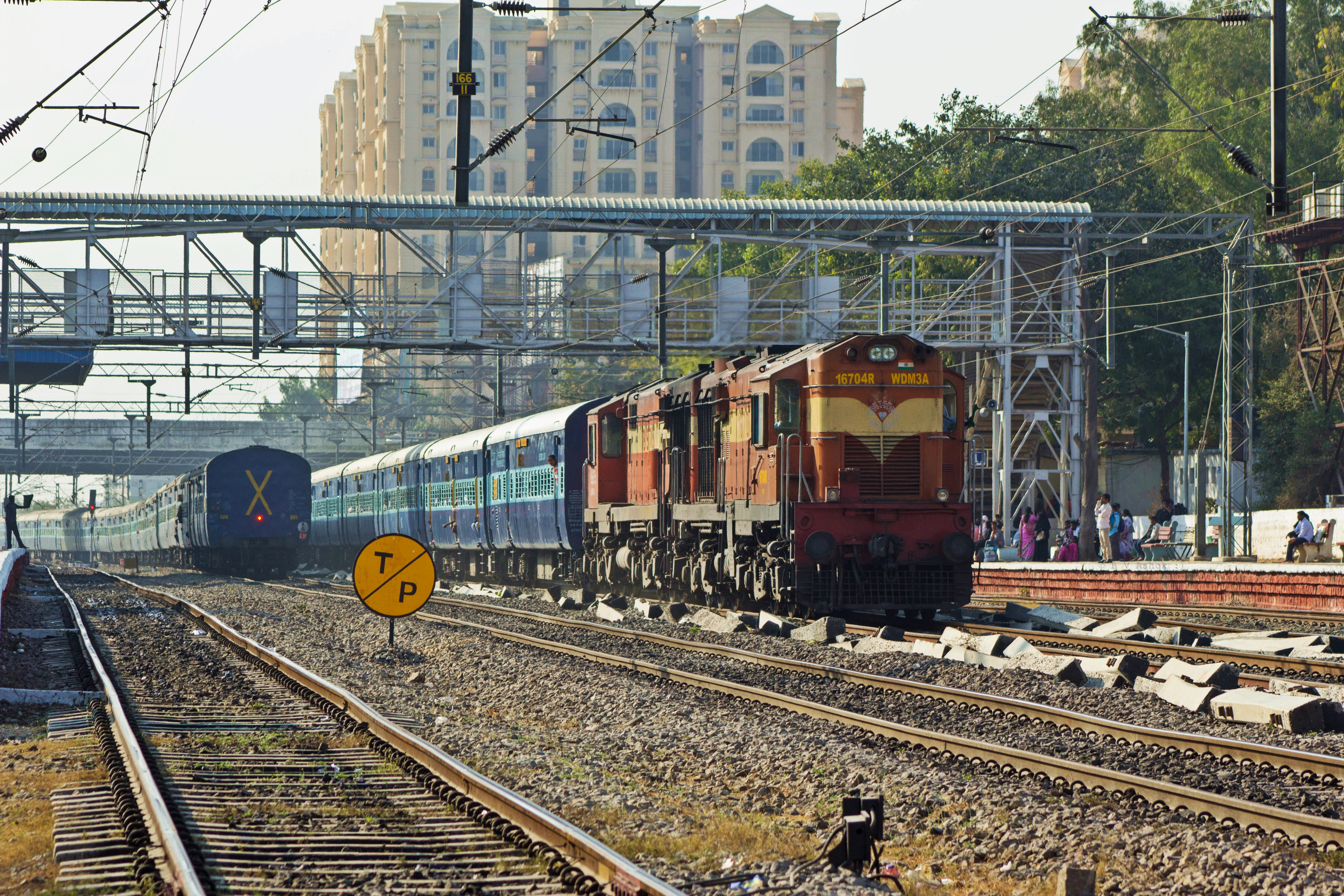
- Palnadu Superfast Express passing through Hafizpet railway station

General information
- Location: Hyderabad; India
- Coordinates: 17.360°N 78.492°E
- System: Indian Railways and Hyderabad MMTS station
- Owner: Indian Railways
- Operator: South Central Railways
- Lines: Falaknuma–Lingampalli route Hyderabad–Lingampalli route
- Platforms: 2
- Tracks: 4
- Connections: Miyapur metro station

Other information
- Station code: HFZ
Location

Hafizpet railway station is a third grade suburban (SG–3) category Indian railway station in Secunderabad railway division of South Central Railway zone. It is located in Hyderabad of the Indian state of Telangana. It was selected as one of the 21 stations to be developed under Amrit Bharat Station Scheme.

== Lines ==
- Hyderabad Multi-Modal Transport System
