= Renukoot railway station =

Railway station in Uttar Pradesh

General information
- Location: Station road, NH-75, Renukut, Sonbhadra, Uttar Pradesh; India
- Coordinates: 24.2037°N 83.0398°E
- Elevation: 313 metres (1,027 ft)
- System: Indian Railways station
- Owner: Indian Railways
- Operator: East Central Railway
- Platforms: 2
- Tracks: 7 (Construction – Doubling of Diesel BG)
- Connections: Auto stand

Construction
- Structure type: Standard (on ground station)
- Parking: Yes
- Cycle facilities: No

Other information
- Status: Functioning
- Station code: RNQ
- Zone(s): East Central Railway
- Division(s): Dhanbad railway division

History
- Rebuilt: yes
Location
- Location within India Location within Uttar Pradesh

Renukoot railway station is a small railway station in Sonbhadra district, Uttar Pradesh. Its code is RNQ. It serves Renukoot town. The station consists of two platforms. The platforms are well sheltered. It is well equipped with water and sanitation. The station is connected to major cities like Delhi, Kolkata, Lucknow, Jammu, Ranchi, Patna, Jabalpur, and Bhopal. The matter for connecting 152 km railway line from Renukoot to Ambikapur is pending in the Railway Board. This is a long awaited demand of the people of Chhattisgarh and Uttar Pradesh.

== Trains ==
Some of the trains that runs from Renukoot are:

- Jharkhand Swarna Jayanti Express
- Ranchi - New Delhi Rajdhani Express
- Shaktipunj Express
- Sambalpur-Jammu Tawi Express
- Singrauli-Patna Express
- Bhopal–Howrah Weekly Express
- Ajmer–Kolkata Express
- Ranchi-Chopan Express
- Triveni Link Express
