= Hinganghat railway station =

Railway Station in Maharashtra, India

Hinganghat railway station हिंगणघाट रेल्वे स्थानक

General information
- Location: National Highway 44, Hinganghat, Maharashtra; India
- Coordinates: 20.5423°N 78.8337°E
- Elevation: 274 metres (899 ft)
- System: Indian Railways station
- Owner: Indian Railways
- Operator: Central Railway
- Lines: New Delhi–Chennai main line and Wardha–Ballharshah main line
- Platforms: 3

Construction
- Structure type: Standard (on-ground station)
- Parking: Available
- Cycle facilities: available

Other information
- Status: Functioning
- Station code: HGT
- Zone(s): Central Railway
- Division(s): Nagpur CR

Passengers
- 7000
Location
- Location within India Location within Maharashtra

Hinganghat railway station is a big railway station between Nagpur and Balharshah sections, located in Maharashtra. Its code is HGT. It serves Hinganghat city. The station consists of three platforms. Amenities include a computerized reservation office, waiting room, retiring room, vegetarian and non-vegetarian refreshments, and book stall. Recently longer platforms were installed.
