= Raver railway station =

Railway Station in Maharashtra, India

Raver

General information
- Location: Raver, Maharashtra, Pincode 425504; Maharashtra India
- Coordinates: 21°13′24″N 76°02′45″E
- Elevation: 242 metres (794 ft)
- System: Indian Railways station
- Owner: Indian Railways
- Operator: Central Railway
- Platforms: 3
- Tracks: 2

Construction
- Parking: Yes
- Cycle facilities: Yes

Other information
- Station code: RV
- Fare zone: Bhusawal

History
- Opened: 1860; 166 years ago
- Electrified: 1988–89
- Former names: Great Indian Peninsula Railway
Location
- Location within Maharashtra Location within India

Raver railway station serves Raver in Jalgaon district in the Indian state of Maharashtra. it is the Lifeline for the People who used to Updown From Raver to Jalgaon for their Job.

== Electrification ==
Railways in the Raver area were electrified in 1988–89.

== Amenities ==
Amenities at Raver railway station include: computerized reservation office, waiting room, retiring room and book stall.

== See also ==
- High-speed rail in India
- Indian Railways
- List of railway stations in India
