= Sullurupeta railway station =

Railway station in Andhra Pradesh, India

Sullurupeta
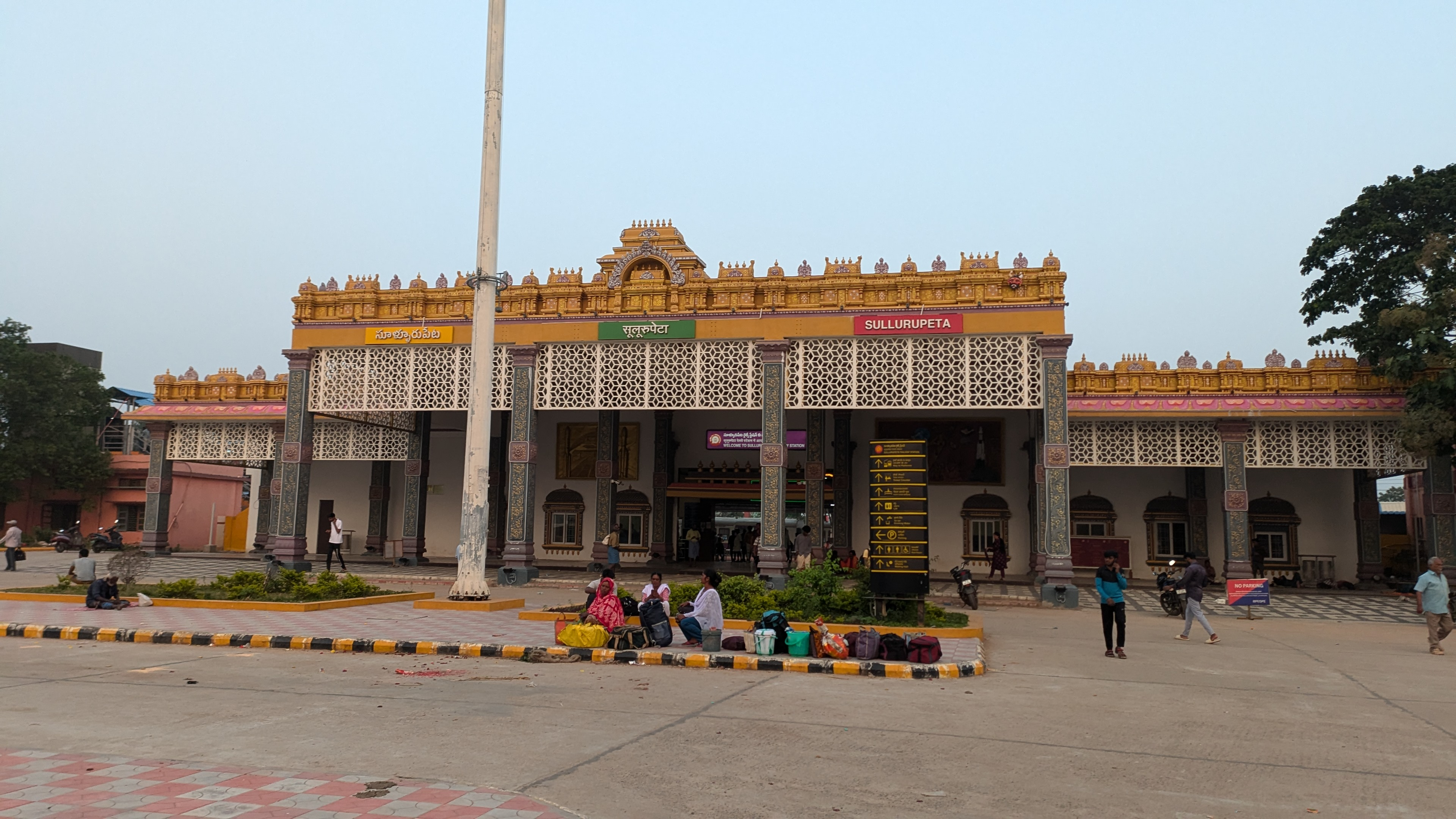
- Railway station entrance

General information
- Location: Sullurpeta, Tirupati district, Andhra Pradesh; India
- Coordinates: 13.6967°N 80.0182°E
- Elevation: 9 m (30 ft)
- System: Indian Railways and Chennai Suburban Railway station
- Lines: Vijayawada–Chennai section of Howrah–Chennai main line and Delhi–Chennai line
- Platforms: 3
- Tracks: 5 ft 6 in (1,676 mm) broad gauge

Construction
- Structure type: Standard (on-ground station)
- Parking: Available

Other information
- Status: Functioning
- Station code: SPE
- Zone(s): Southern Railway,
- Division(s): Chennai

History
- Opened: 1899
- Electrified: 1980–81
Location

Sullurupeta railway station (station code:SPE) is an NSG–5 category Indian railway station in Chennai railway division of Southern Railway zone. It located in the Indian state of Andhra Pradesh, serves Sullurpeta in Tirupati district.

== History ==
The Vijayawada–Chennai link was established in 1899.

The Chirala–Elavur section was electrified in 1980–81.

== Station ==
Sullurpeta station has three platforms. Each day, 39 trains pass through this station and four trains originate from here.This is the only station in India where a suburban train is operated inter-state.Chennai M.M.C station to Sulurpetta station (emu)local train.

== Amenities ==
Sullurpeta station has computerised reservation facilities (with all-India linkage), waiting room and retiring room.
