= Fatehpur Shekhawati railway station =

Railway station in Rajasthan, India

Fatehpur Shekhawati

General information
- Location: Fatehpur Shekhawati, NH 11, NH 52, NH 65 and State Highway 41, Fatehpur, Rajasthan; India
- Coordinates: 28.0001°N 74.9707°E
- Elevation: 331 metres (1,086 ft)
- System: Express train and Passenger train station
- Owner: Indian Railways
- Line: Churu–Sikar line
- Platforms: 2
- Tracks: 4
- Connections: Auto stand

Construction
- Structure type: Standard (on-ground station)
- Parking: Yes
- Cycle facilities: Yes

Other information
- Status: Active
- Station code: FPS
- Fare zone: North Western Railway

History
- Opened: 1942; 84 years ago
- Closed: Closed for BG conversion, 14 November 2015; 10 years ago Reopened 20 June 2017; 9 years ago
- Rebuilt: Yes
Location
- Location within India Location within Rajasthan

Fatehpur Shekhawati railway station is a railway station in Sikar district, Rajasthan. Its code is FPS. It serves Fatehpur city. The Railway station is located in the center of the city, 1.5 km from the national highway.

This is a medium-sized railway station, so the main campus area is not as large compared to other junction stations like Sikar Junction and Ringas Junction. However, it is good in terms of cleanliness and facilities.

== Line and location ==
Fatehpur Shekhawati comes within the territory of the North Western Railway located on Churu–Sikar–Jaipur
