= Nagina railway station =

Railway station in Uttar Pradesh

Nagina

General information
- Location: main market Nagina, Bijnor district, Uttar Pradesh; India
- Coordinates: 29.4382°N 78.4238°E
- Elevation: 248 m (814 ft)
- System: Passenger train station
- Owner: Indian Railways
- Operator: Northern Railway
- Lines: Moradabad Bareilly and Lucknow
- Platforms: 3
- Tracks: 4

Construction
- Structure type: Standard (on ground station)
- Parking: yes

Other information
- Status: Active
- Station code: NGG
- Zone(s): Northern Railway zone
- Division(s): Moradabad

History
- Opened: 1887
- Former names: Oudh and Rohilkhand Railway

Services
Preceding station	Indian Railways	Following station
Najibabad Junction towards ?	Northern Railway zone	Terminus
Location

Nagina railway station is a station in Nagina, Bijnor district, India, on the Najibabad line from Moradabad and Lucknow under the Moradabad railway division of the Northern Railway zone.
