= Shamli railway station =

Train station in Uttar Pradesh, India

General information
- Location: Shamli district, Uttar Pradesh; India
- Coordinates: 29.4450°N 77.3166°E
- Elevation: 242.628 metres (796.02 ft)
- System: Indian Railways station
- Owner: Indian Railways
- Operator: Northern Railway
- Line: Delhi–Shamli–Saharanpur line
- Platforms: 3
- Tracks: 6 (Single Electric BG)
- Connections: Auto stand

Construction
- Structure type: Standard (on-ground station)
- Parking: Yes
- Cycle facilities: No

Other information
- Status: Functioning
- Station code: SMQL
- Zone(s): Northern Railway
- Division(s): Delhi

History
- Rebuilt: Construction ongoing under Amrit Bharat Stations scheme

Passengers
- 150000-200000 Daily
Location
- Location within India Location within Uttar Pradesh

Shamli railway station is a main railway station in Shamli district, Uttar Pradesh. Its code is SMQL. It serves Shamli city. The station consists of three platforms. The platforms are well sheltered. It has many facilities including food, water and sanitation. The station is under construction and renovation under Amrit Bharat Stations scheme.

== Trains ==
Some of the trains that runs from Shamli are :

- 04736/37 Bikaner–Haridwar Special Fare Special Express
- 19609/10 Udaipur City-Yog Nagri Rishikesh Express
- Saharanpur–Delhi Janta Express (UP- 14545, Down- 14546)
- 04999/05000 Shamli Delhi Passenger
- Shamli Delhi DEMU Passenger
- Shamli Saharanpur Passenger
- 01617/18 Delhi-Shamli-Delhi Sewa Service Memu
- 04429/30 Delhi-Saharanpur-Delhi Memu
- 14305/06 Delhi-Haridwar Express
