= Rajgarh railway station =

Railway station in Rajasthan, India

Rajgarh

General information
- Location: Rajgarh, Alwar district, Rajasthan; India
- Coordinates: 27.241901°N 76.606642°E
- Elevation: 298 metres (978 ft)
- System: Indian Railways station
- Owner: Indian Railways
- Operator: North Western Railway
- Line: Delhi–Jaipur line
- Platforms: 2
- Tracks: 4

Construction
- Structure type: Standard (on ground station)
- Parking: Yes

Other information
- Status: Functioning
- Station code: RHG
- Zone(s): North Western Railway
- Division(s): Jaipur
Location
- Location within India Location within Rajasthan

Rajgarh railway station is a railway station in Alwar district, Rajasthan. Its code is RHG. It serves Rajgarh town. The station consists of 2 platforms. Passenger, Express trains halt here.
