= Deeg railway station =

Railway station in Rajasthan, India

Deeg

General information
- Location: Deeg, Bharatpur district, Rajasthan; India
- Coordinates: 27.486893°N 77.324957°E
- System: Indian Railways station
- Owner: Indian Railways
- Operator: North Central Railway
- Line: Alwar–Mathura line
- Platforms: 2
- Tracks: 2

Construction
- Structure type: Standard (on ground station)
- Parking: Yes

Other information
- Status: Functioning
- Station code: DEEG
- Zone(s): North Central Railway
- Division(s): Agra
Location
- Location within India Location within Rajasthan

Deeg railway station is a railway station in Deeg district, Rajasthan. Its code is DEEG. It serves Deeg. The station consists of 2 platforms. Passenger, Superfast trains halt here.
