= Vyasnagar railway station =

Railway station in Uttar Pradesh, India

General information
- Location: Chanditara, Uttar Pradesh; India
- Coordinates: 25.296976°N 83.0691463°E
- Elevation: 82 metres (269 ft)
- System: Indian Railways station
- Owner: Indian Railways
- Operator: Northern Railway
- Line: Varanasi–Lucknow line
- Platforms: 2
- Tracks: 2

Construction
- Structure type: Standard (on-ground station)
- Parking: No
- Cycle facilities: No

Other information
- Status: Double electric line
- Station code: VYN
- Zone(s): Northern Railway
- Division(s): Varanasi
Location
- Location within India Location within Uttar Pradesh

Vyasnagar railway station is a small railway station in Varanasi district, Uttar Pradesh. Its code is VYN. It serves Chanditara town. The station consists of two platforms, neither well sheltered. It lacks many facilities including water and sanitation.
