= Dakor railway station =

Railway station in Gujarat, India

General information
- Location: Dakor, Gujarat; India
- Coordinates: 22°44′47″N 73°09′29″E
- Elevation: 54 metres (177 ft)
- System: Indian Railways station
- Owner: Ministry of Railways, Indian Railways
- Operator: Western Railway
- Line: Anand–Godhra section
- Platforms: 2
- Tracks: 2

Construction
- Structure type: Standard (on ground)
- Parking: No

Other information
- Status: Functioning
- Station code: DK
- Zone(s): Western Railway
- Division(s): Vadodara
Location
- Location within India Location within Gujarat

Dakor railway station is a railway station on the Western Railway network in the state of Gujarat, India. Dakor railway station is 29 km far away from Anand Junction railway station. MEMU trains halt here.

== See also ==
- Kheda district
