= Sangrur railway station =

Train station in Punjab, India

General information
- Location: Station Rd, Sangrur, Sangrur district, Punjab; India
- Coordinates: 30°14′32″N 75°49′49″E
- Elevation: 239 metres (784 ft)
- System: Indian Railway
- Owner: Indian Railways
- Operator: Northern Railway
- Line: Ludhiana–Jakhal line
- Platforms: 2
- Tracks: 5 ft 6 in (1,676 mm) broad gauge

Construction
- Structure type: Standard on ground
- Parking: Yes

Other information
- Status: Functioning
- Station code: SAG
- Division(s): Ambala

History
- Opened: 1905
- Electrified: 2020
Location
- Location within Punjab Location within India

Sangrur railway station (station code: SAG) is a railway station located in Sangrur district in the Indian state of Punjab and serves Sangrur city. Sangrur station falls under Ambala railway division of Northern Railway zone of Indian Railways.

== The railway station ==
Sangrur railway station is at an elevation of 239 metres (784 ft) and was assigned the station code – SAG. This station is located on the single track, 5 ft 6 in (1,676 mm) broad gauge, Ludhiana–Jakhal line. It is well connected to a number of major cities.

== Electrification ==
Sangrur railway station tracks electrification was completed in year 2020. The electrification of 62 km long stretch of Dhuri–Jakhal on Ludhiana–Jakhal line was completed and trial runs were successfully carried out in July 2020. The station is located between Dhuri and Jakhal stations.

== Amenities ==
Sangrur railway station has computerized reservation counters, and all basic amenities like drinking water, public toilets, retiring room, sheltered area with adequate seating and an ATM. There is one foot overbridge connecting platforms.
