= Kotdwar railway station =

Railway station in Uttarakhand, India

Kotdwar

General information
- Location: Off. NH 534, Bus Stand Road Kotdwar, Pauri Garhwal, Uttarakhand; India
- Coordinates: 29°45′0″N 78°31′48″E
- Elevation: 45 metres (148 ft)
- System: Indian Railways station
- Owner: Indian Railways
- Operator: Northern Railway
- Platforms: 1
- Tracks: 2

Construction
- Structure type: Standard on-ground
- Parking: Yes
- Accessible: Available

Other information
- Status: Functioning
- Station code: KTW
- Zone(s): Northern Railway zone
- Division(s): Moradabad

Passengers
- Daily: 100,000+
Location
- Location within Uttarakhand Location within India

Kotdwar railway station (station code: KTW) is a railway station in Uttarakhand, India. It is operated by Indian Railways situated under the Northern railway zone. It is located off NH 534 near the Bus Stand Road in Kotdwar, Pauri Garhwal district, Uttarakhand. The station boasts 1 platform and offers basic amenities like waiting rooms and refreshment stalls. Travelers can find local shops, auto-rickshaws, and bus services readily available outside the station, making it a convenient hub for exploring the surrounding areas. It was established during the British Raj, which is planned to be renewed, and the foundation stone was led by Narendra Modi.
