= Hirnoda =

- Village
- Location in Rajasthan, India Hirnoda (India)
- Coordinates: 26.9124235°N 75.7872809°E
- Country: India
- State: Rajasthan
- District: Jaipur rural district

Government
  - Body: Gram panchayat
- Elevation: 377 m (1,237 ft)

Population (2011)
  - Total: 6,229

Languages
  - Official: Hindi
- Time zone: UTC+5:30 (IST)
- ISO 3166 code: RJ-IN
- Vehicle registration: RJ-
- Website: https://www.hirnoda.com/

Hirnoda is a village in Phulera tehsil of the Jaipur rural district in Rajasthan state of India.

== Demography ==
- As per 2011 census, Hirnoda has total 1107 families residing. Village has population of 6,229 of which 3,186 were males while 3,043 were females.
- Average Sex Ratio of Hirnoda village is 955 which is higher than Rajasthan state average of 928.
- Literacy rate of Hirnoda village was 73.56% which is higher than 66.11% of Rajasthan. Male literacy rate was 86.14% while female literacy rate was 60.28%.
- Schedule Caste (SC) constitutes 10.1% while Schedule Tribe (ST) were 1.5% of total population.
