= HITEC City railway station =

Railway station in Telangana, India

HITEC City
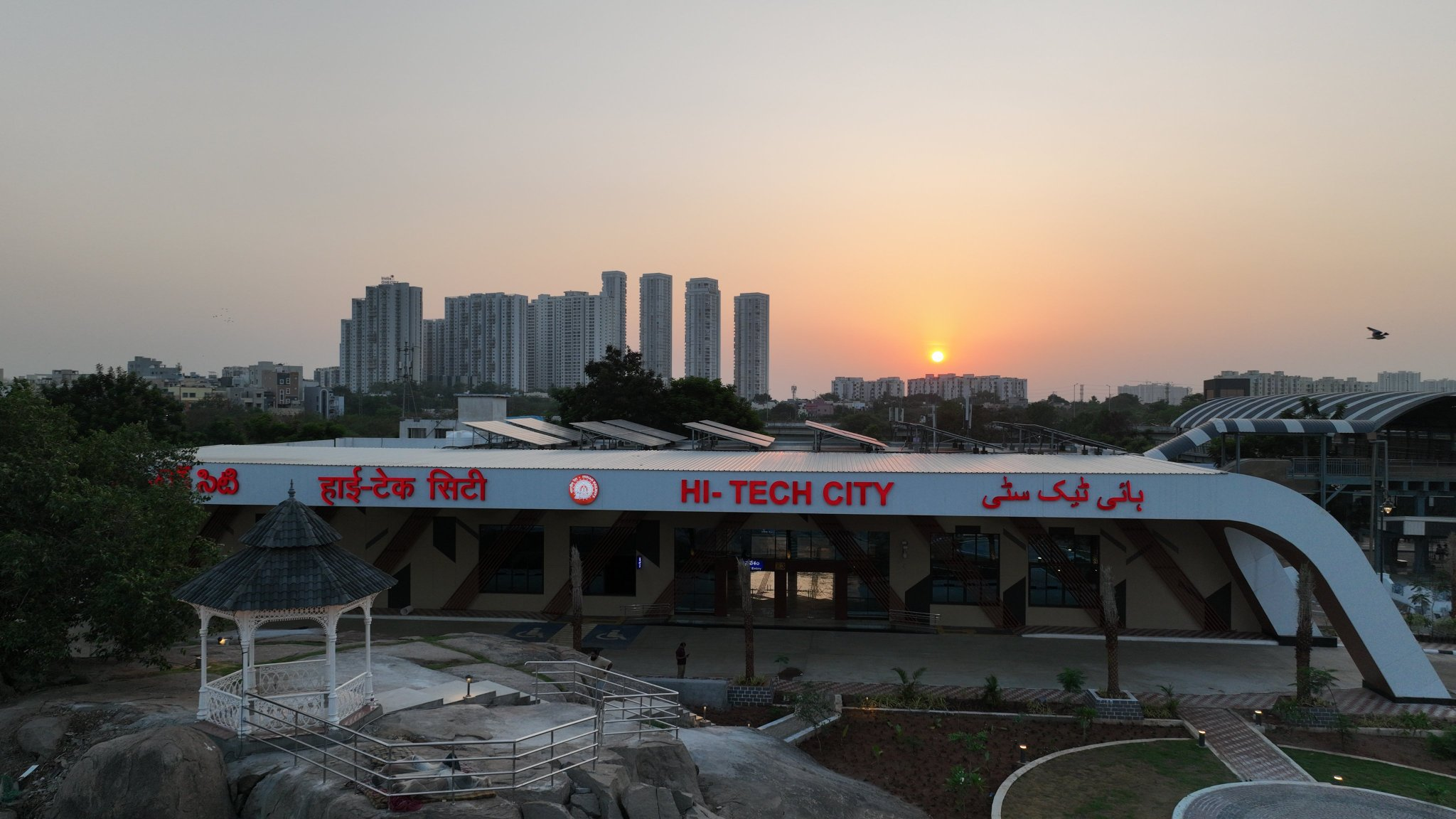
- HITEC City railway station

General information
- Location: Hyderabad, Telangana; India
- Coordinates: 17.360°N 78.492°E
- System: Indian Railways and Hyderabad MMTS station
- Owner: Indian Railways
- Operator: South Central Railways
- Platforms: 2

Construction
- Structure type: Standard on ground
- Accessible: Available

Other information
- Status: Functional
- Station code: HTCY
- Zone(s): South Central Railway zone
- Division(s): Hyderabad
Location

HITEC City railway station is a third grade suburban (SG–3) category Indian railway station in Secunderabad railway division of South Central Railway zone. It is located in Hyderabad of the Indian state of Telangana. It was selected as one of the 21 stations to be developed under Amrit Bharat Stations scheme.

A modern railway terminal is proposed to be constructed near HITEC City railway station to facilitate passengers in the western parts of the city. There are also proposals to build a fourth railway terminal to handle the excess inter-city railway transportation in the city due to an increase in rail traffic.

Meanwhile, in order to ease the boarding long distant trains by the surrounding public, the railways decided to provide halt for long distant running trains here. In that regard an infrastructure upliftment was carried out by SCR. As of August 2021, the existing two platforms were extended to handle the 24 coaches trains at a cost of close to 2 crore rupees. Parking areas on both sides were improved and two lifts were installed at a cost of 70 lakh rupees.

== Transport ==
There are shared Autos which ply to important destinations of IT parks. TSRTC operates buses to various destinations from HITEC city.

== Lines ==
- Hyderabad Multi-Modal Transport System
  - Falaknuma– Lingampally route (FL Line)
  - Hyderabad-Lingampally route

== Gallery ==
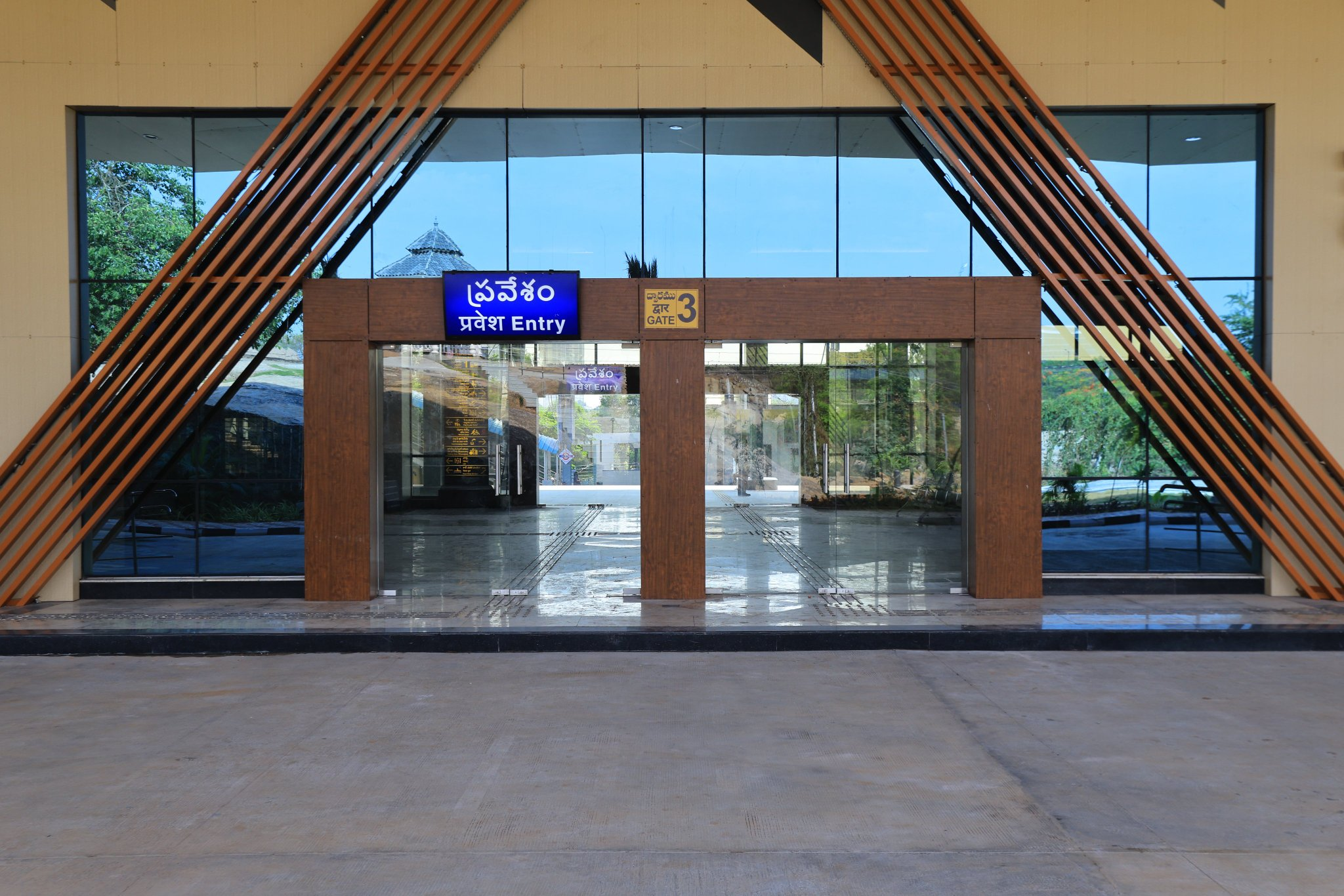
Entrance
