= Ambala City railway station =

Railway station in Haryana, India

Ambala City Railway Station
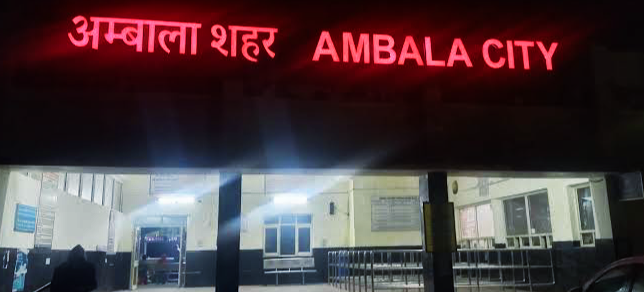
- Ambala City Railway Station

General information
- Location: NH-1, Ambala, Haryana; India
- Coordinates: 30.3780°N 76.7644°E
- Elevation: 272 metres (892 ft)
- System: Indian Railways station
- Owner: Indian Railways
- Operator: Northern Railway
- Platforms: 3
- Tracks: 5

Construction
- Structure type: Standard (on-ground station)
- Parking: Yes
- Cycle facilities: Yes
- Accessible: No

Other information
- Status: Status
- Station code: UBC
- Zone(s): Northern Railway
- Division(s): Ambala
Location
- Location within India Location within Haryana

Ambala Railway Station is a main railway station in Ambala district, Haryana. Its code is UBC. It serves Ambala city. The station consists of three platforms, none well sheltered. It lacks many facilities including water and sanitation. It lies on Moradabad–Ambala line and Ambala–Attari line. Approximately 71 trains pass through the station daily.
