= Mansa railway station =

Train station in Punjab, India

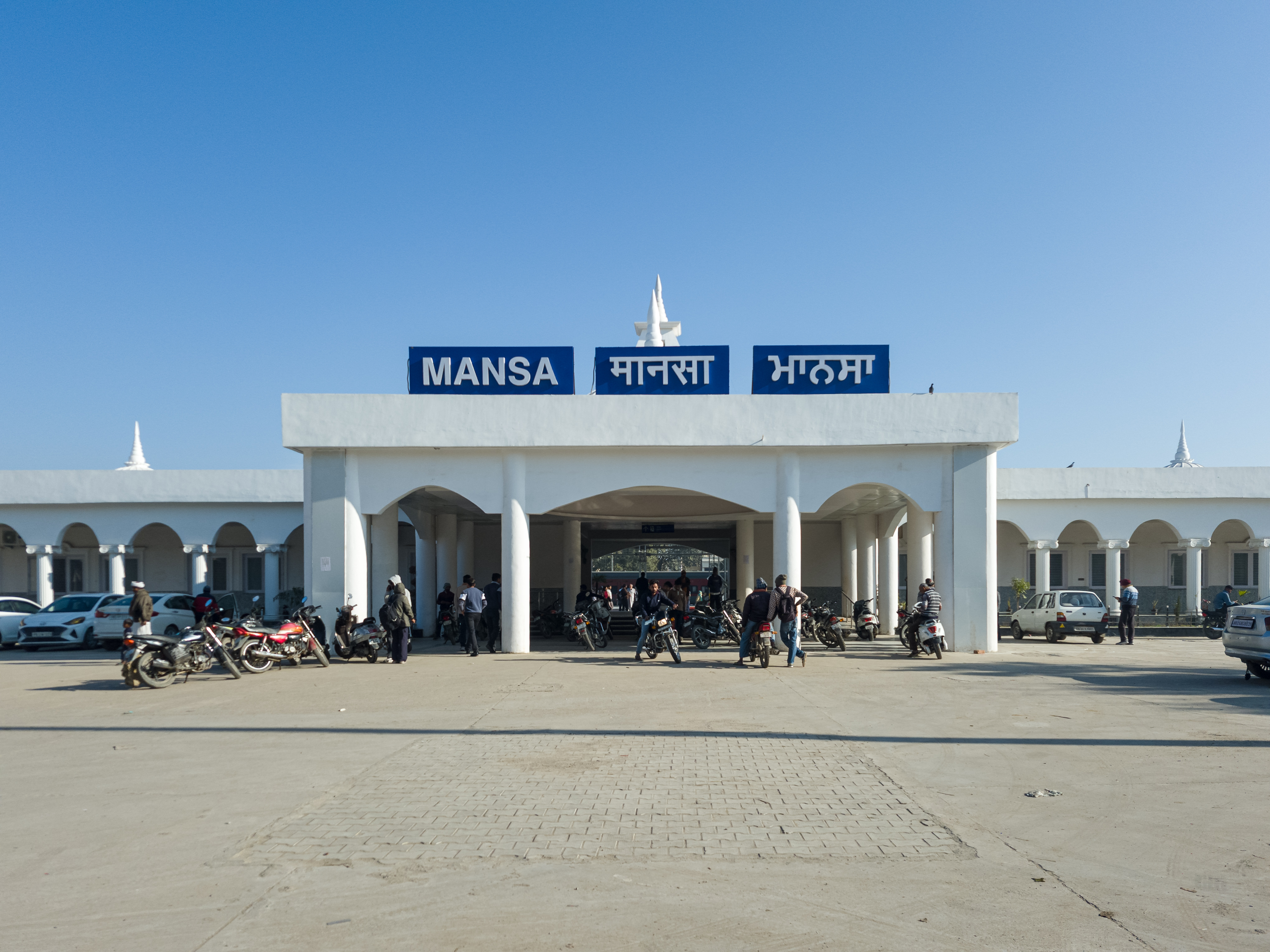

General information
- Location: Gaushala Road, Mansa, Mansa district, Punjab; India
- Coordinates: 29°59′18″N 75°24′15″E
- Elevation: 223 metres (732 ft)
- System: Indian Railway
- Owner: Indian Railways
- Operator: Northern Railway
- Line: Delhi–Fazilka line
- Platforms: 2
- Tracks: 5 ft 6 in (1,676 mm) broad gauge

Construction
- Structure type: Standard on ground
- Parking: Yes

Other information
- Status: Functioning
- Station code: MSZ
- Division(s): Delhi
Location
- Location within Punjab

Mansa railway station is located in the Mansa district of the Indian state of Punjab and serves the city of Mansa, the administrative headquarter of the district. Its station code is MSZ. Mansa station falls under the Delhi railway division of the Northern Railway zone of Indian Railways.

== The railway station ==
Mansa railway station is located at an elevation of 223 metres (732 ft). The station is located on the double track, 5 ft 6 in (1,676 mm) broad gauge, Jakhal–Bathinda section of the Delhi–Fazilka line.

== Electrification ==
Mansa railway station is situated on a double track electrified line. There are three electrified tracks at the station.

== Amenities ==
Mansa railway station lacks an enquiry office, but has a booking window and all basic amenities like drinking water, public toilets and a sheltered area with adequate seating. There are two platforms at the station and one foot overbridge (FOB). Another foot overbridge across the railway tracks of the station provides pedestrian connectivity between residential areas.

== Gallery ==
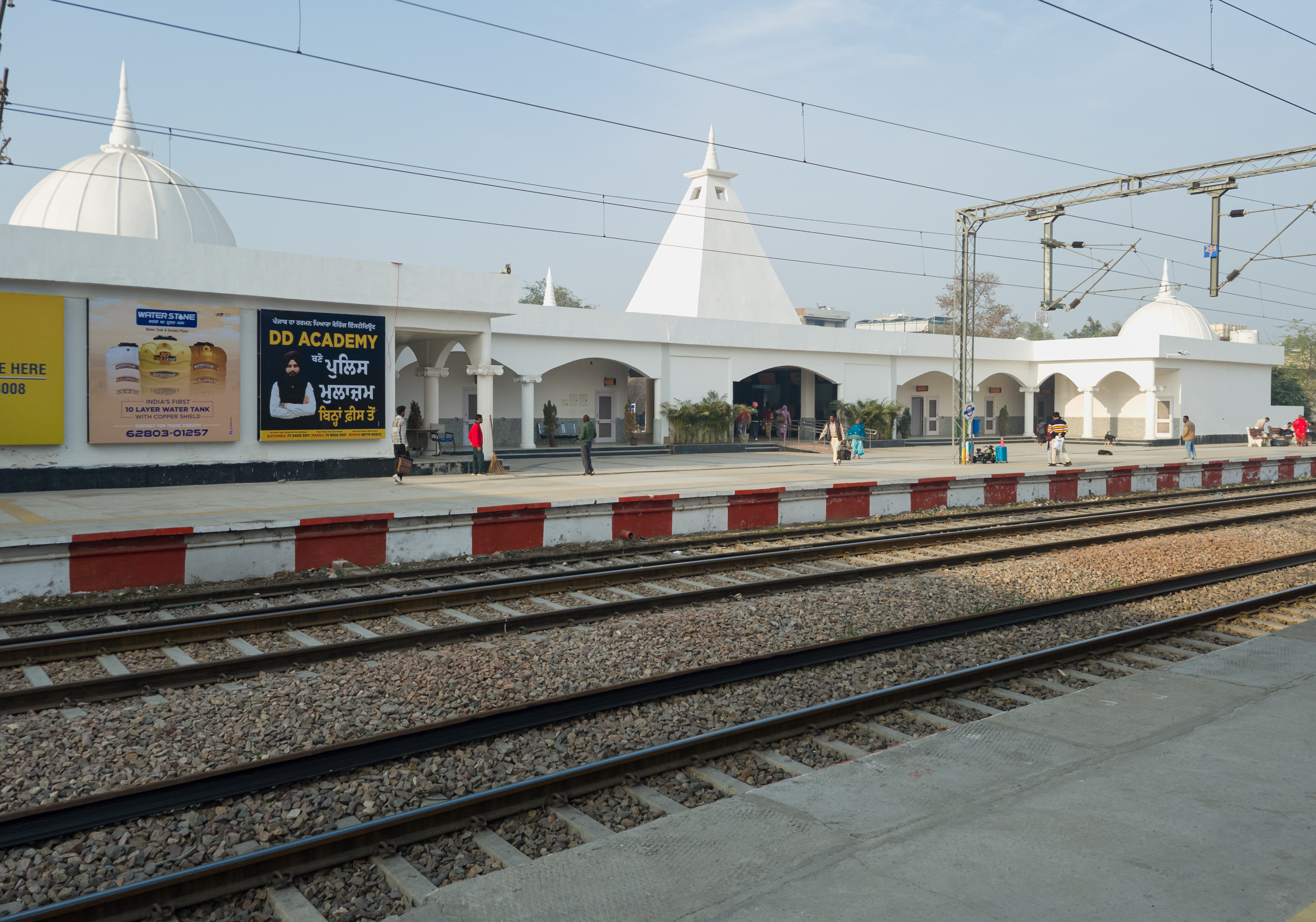
Main Building

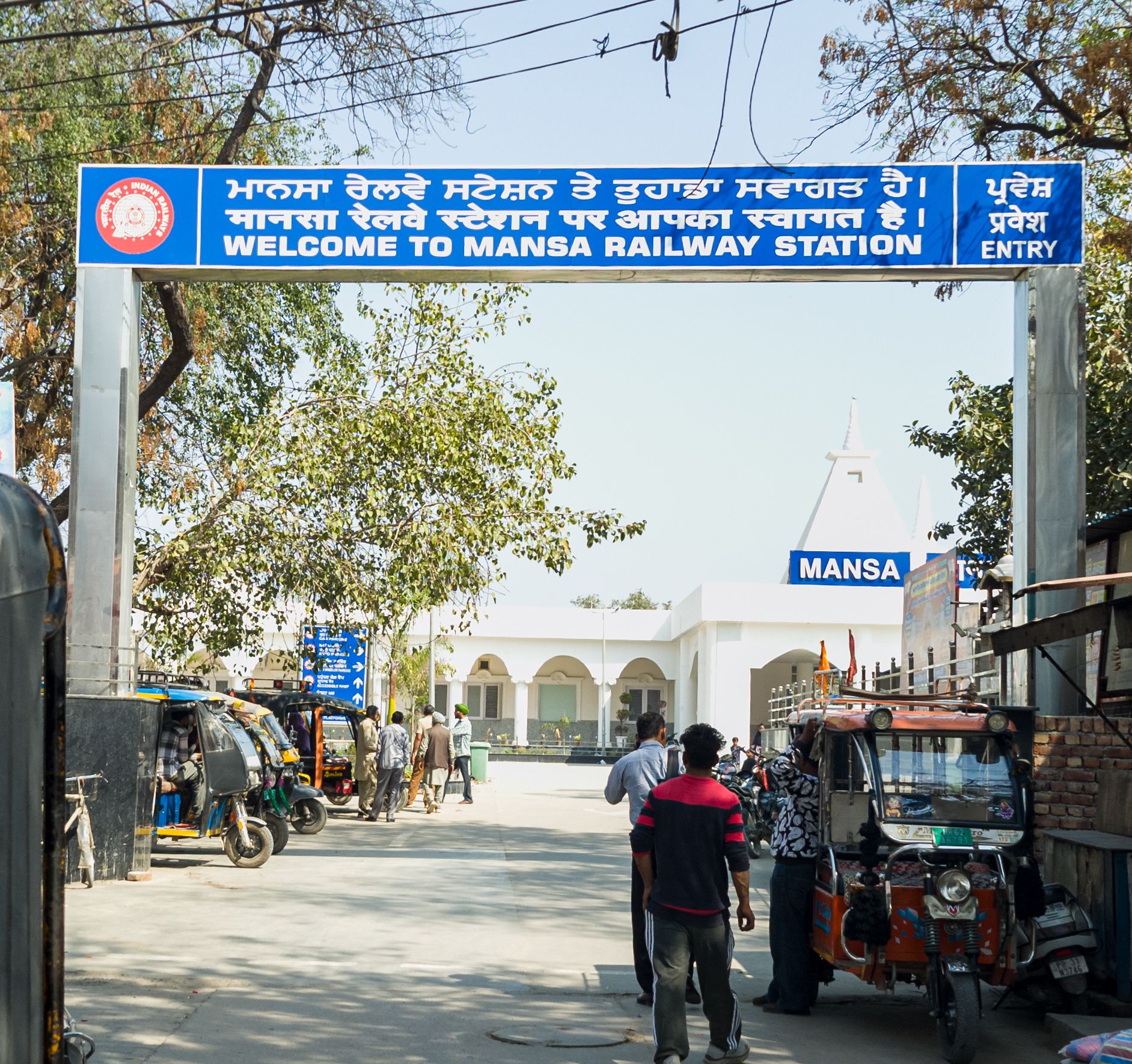
Entrance
