= Bhilai Nagar railway station =

Railway station in Chhattisgarh

Bhilai Nagar
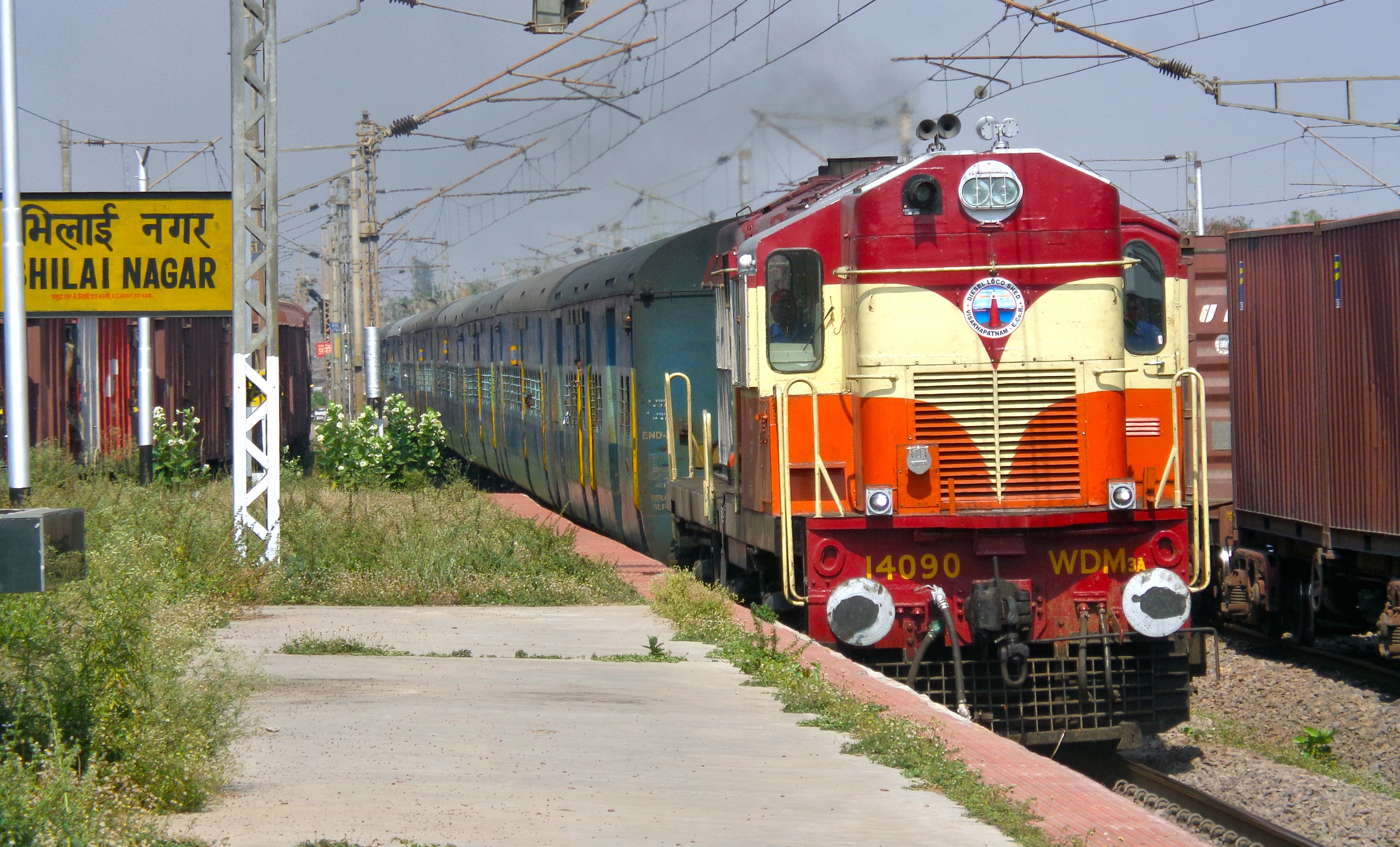
- A passenger train at Bhilai Nagar

General information
- Location: Garage Road, Maharana Pratap Square, Sector 7, Bhilai, Durg district, Chhattisgarh; India
- Coordinates: 21.2012°N 81.3347°E
- Elevation: 297 metres (974 ft)
- System: Indian Railways station
- Owner: Indian Railways
- Operator: South East Central Railways
- Line: Howrah–Nagpur–Mumbai line
- Platforms: 5
- Tracks: 8
- Connections: Auto stand

Construction
- Structure type: Standard (on-ground station)
- Parking: Yes
- Cycle facilities: No
- Accessible: Available

Other information
- Status: Functioning
- Station code: BQR
- Zone(s): South East Central Railway zone
- Division(s): Raipur
Location
- Location within Chhattisgarh Location within India

Bhilai Nagar Railway Station is a small railway station of Bhilai city, Chhattisgarh. Its code is BQR. It serves Bhilai city. The station consists of five platforms. Bhilai Nagar one of the five railway station in Bhilai city. The station lies on the main Howrah–Mumbai rail line.
