= Nandgaon railway station =

Railway Station in Maharashtra, India

Nandgaon
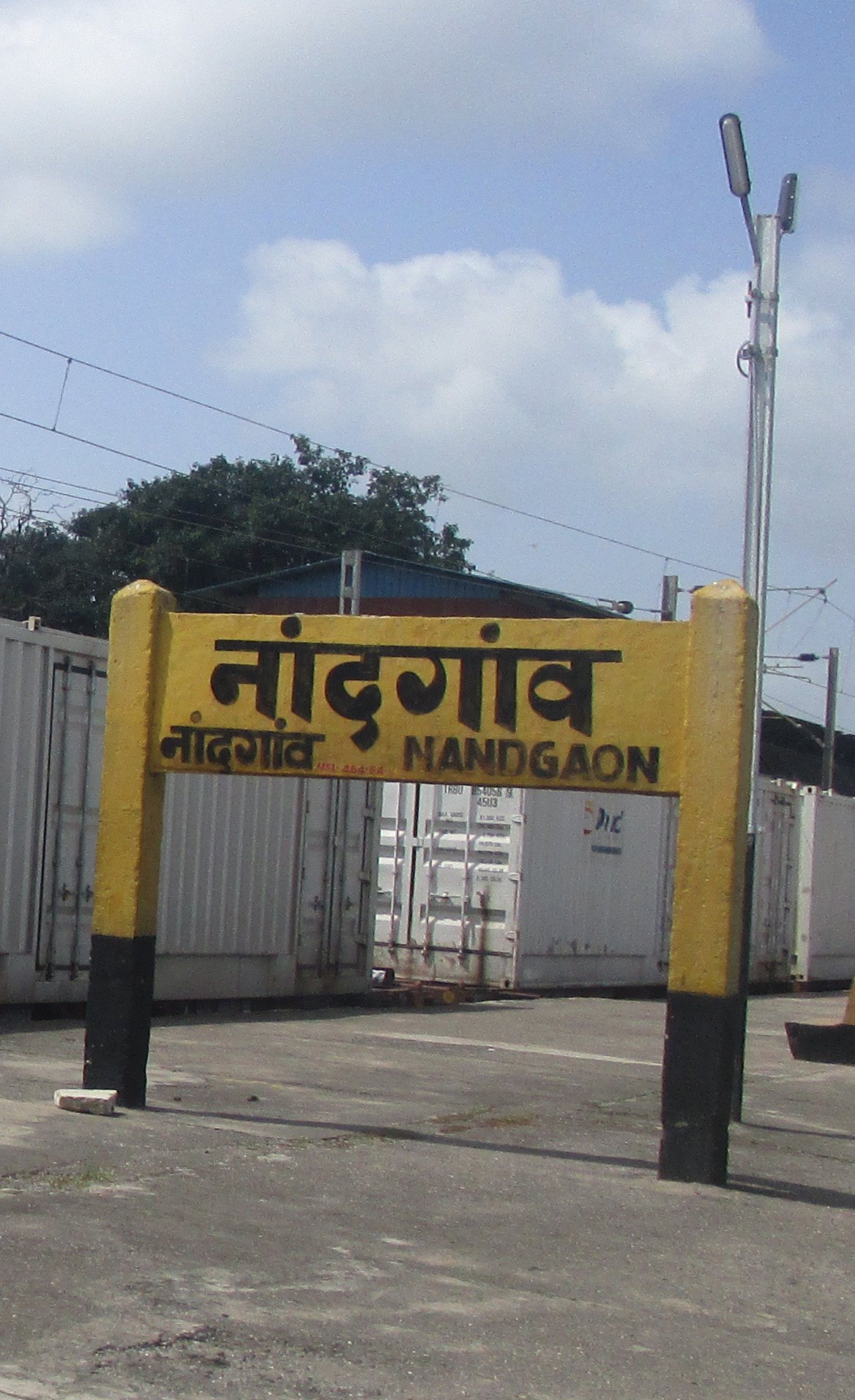

General information
- Location: Nandgaon, Maharashtra, PIN 423106; India
- Coordinates: 20°18′33″N 74°39′37″E
- Elevation: 475.84 metres (1,561.2 ft)
- System: Indian Railways station
- Owner: Indian Railways
- Operator: Central Railway
- Lines: Bhusawal–Kalyan section of Howrah–Nagpur–Mumbai line, Howrah–Allahabad–Mumbai line
- Platforms: 4
- Tracks: Up & Down

Construction
- Structure type: Standard, on ground
- Parking: Available
- Accessible: Disabled access

Other information
- Status: Active
- Station code: NGN
- Division(s): Bhusawal

History
- Opened: 1866; 160 years ago
- Electrified: 1968–69
- Former names: Great Indian Peninsula Railway
Location
- Location within India Location within Maharashtra

Nandgaon railway station serves Nandgaon city in Nashik district in the India state of Maharashtra.

== History ==
The first train in India travelled from Mumbai to Thane on 16 April 1853. By May 1854, Great Indian Peninsula Railway's Mumbai–Thane line was extended to Kalyan. Bhusawal was set up in 1860, but the service started in the mid-1860s. The line was extended to Khandwa in 1866 and to Nagpur in 1867.

=== Electrification ===
The railways in the Niphad–Manmad–Nandagaon sector were electrified in 1968–69.

== Amenities ==
Amenities at Nandgaon railway station include: computerized reservation office, subscriber trunk dialling/public call office booth, waiting room, retiring room.
