= Harishankar Road railway station =

Railway station in Odisha, India

Harishankar Road

General information
- Location: Harishankar Road, Odisha; India
- Coordinates: 20°37′37″N 82°45′55″E
- System: Indian Railways station
- Owner: Ministry of Railways, Indian Railways
- Line: Raipur–Vizianagaram line
- Platforms: 2
- Tracks: 2

Construction
- Structure type: Standard (on ground)
- Parking: No

Other information
- Status: Functioning
- Station code: HSK
- Zone(s): East Coast Railway
- Division(s): Sambalpur
Location
- Location within India Location within Odisha

Harishankar Road railway station is a railway station on the East Coast Railway network in the state of Odisha, India. It serves Lathore village. Its code is HSK. It has two platforms. Passenger, Express and Superfast trains halt at Harishankar Road railway station.

== Major trains ==
- Korba–Visakhapatnam Express
- Puri–Durg Express
- Samata Express
- Bilaspur–Tirupati Express

== See also ==
- Balangir district
