= Govindpur railway station =

Railway Station in Jharkhand

Govindpur Railway Station

General information
- Location: Khankripara, Jamshedpur, East Singhbhum district, Jharkhand; India
- Coordinates: 22.743120°N 86.260705°E
- Elevation: 159 m (522 ft)
- System: Passenger halt station
- Owner: Indian Railways
- Operator: South Eastern Railway
- Line: Howrah–Nagpur–Mumbai line
- Platforms: 2

Construction
- Structure type: Standard (on ground station)

Other information
- Status: Functioning
- Station code: GVDP
- Zone(s): South Eastern Railway zone
- Division(s): Chakradharpur railway division

History
- Former names: Bengal Nagpur Railway
Location
- Location within India Location within Jharkhand

Govindpur Railway Station is a Passenger Halt (PH) railway station on Howrah–Nagpur–Mumbai line under Chakradharpur railway division of South Eastern Railway zone. It is situated at Subash Nagar, Khankripara, Jamshedpur in East Singhbhum district in the Indian state of Jharkhand. It is only 7 km (4 mi) from Tatanagar Junction.
