= Kotkapura Junction railway station =

Train station in Punjab, India

Kotkapura Junction

General information
- Location: SH 16, Kotkapura, Faridkot, Punjab; India
- Coordinates: 30°34′47″N 74°49′03″E
- Elevation: 209 metres (686 ft)
- System: Indian Railway
- Owner: Indian Railways
- Operator: Northern Railway
- Lines: Bathinda–Firozpur line Fazilka–Kotkapura line
- Platforms: 3
- Tracks: 5 ft 6 in (1,676 mm) broad gauge

Construction
- Structure type: Standard on ground
- Parking: Yes
- Cycle facilities: No

Other information
- Status: Functioning
- Station code: KKP
- Division(s): Firozpur
Location

Kotkapura Junction (station code: KKP) is a railway station located in Faridkot district in the Indian state of Punjab and serves Kotkapura city. Kotkapura station falls under Firozpur railway division of Northern Railway zone of Indian Railways.

== The railway station ==
Kotkapura railway station is at an elevation of 209 metres (686 ft) and was assigned the code – KKP. The station is located on the single track, 5 ft 6 in (1,676 mm) broad gauge Bhatinda–Firozpur railway line. It is well connected to a number of major cities.

== Electrification ==
The electrification of the single-track BG Kotkapura–Fazilka line is in the pipeline. The electrification of the single track, 87 km Bhatinda–Firozpur railway sector was sanctioned at a cost of Rs 223.93 crore in September, 2018. The completion of electrification is expected by March 2022.

== Amenities ==
Kotkapura railway station has 4 booking windows, and all basic amenities including an ATM. There are two foot over bridges connecting station with roads across railway tracks.
