= Devlali railway station =

Railway station in Maharashtra, India

Coordinates: 19.8971°N 73.8367°E

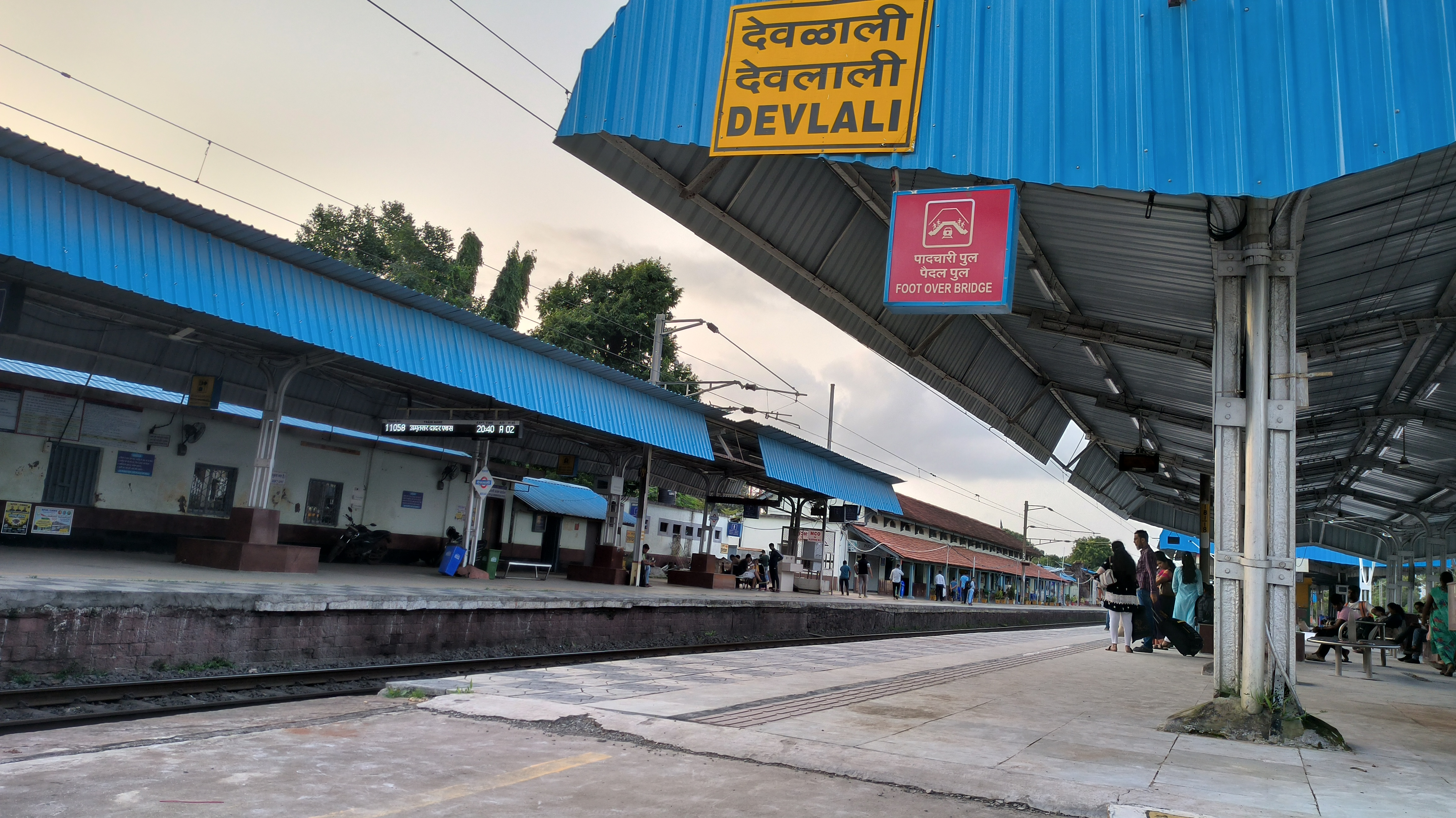
- Devlali Railway Station in August 2023

General information
- Location: Deolali, Nashik, Maharashtra; India
- Elevation: 108 metres (354 ft)
- System: Indian Railways station
- Owner: Indian Railways
- Operator: Bhusawal railway division
- Line: Mumbai- Nashik Road Line
- Platforms: 3 + (3 Proposed
- Tracks: 4
- Connections: Auto stand

Construction
- Structure type: Standard (on-ground station)
- Parking: Yes
- Cycle facilities: Yes

Other information
- Status: Functioning
- Station code: DVL
- Fare zone: Central Railway
Location
- Location within India Location within Maharashtra

Devlali railway station is a railway station serving Devlali town, near Nashik in Maharashtra State of India. It is under Bhusawal railway division of Central Railway zone of Indian Railways.

It is located at 560 m above sea level and has three platforms. As of 2016, an electrified double 5 ft 6 in (1,676 mm) broad gauge railway line exists. At this station, 46 trains stop, one train originates and one train terminates. Ozar Airport, near Nashik, is at distance of 27 kilometers.
