= Sri Muktsar Sahib Railway Station =

Train station in Punjab, India

Sri Muktsar Sahib
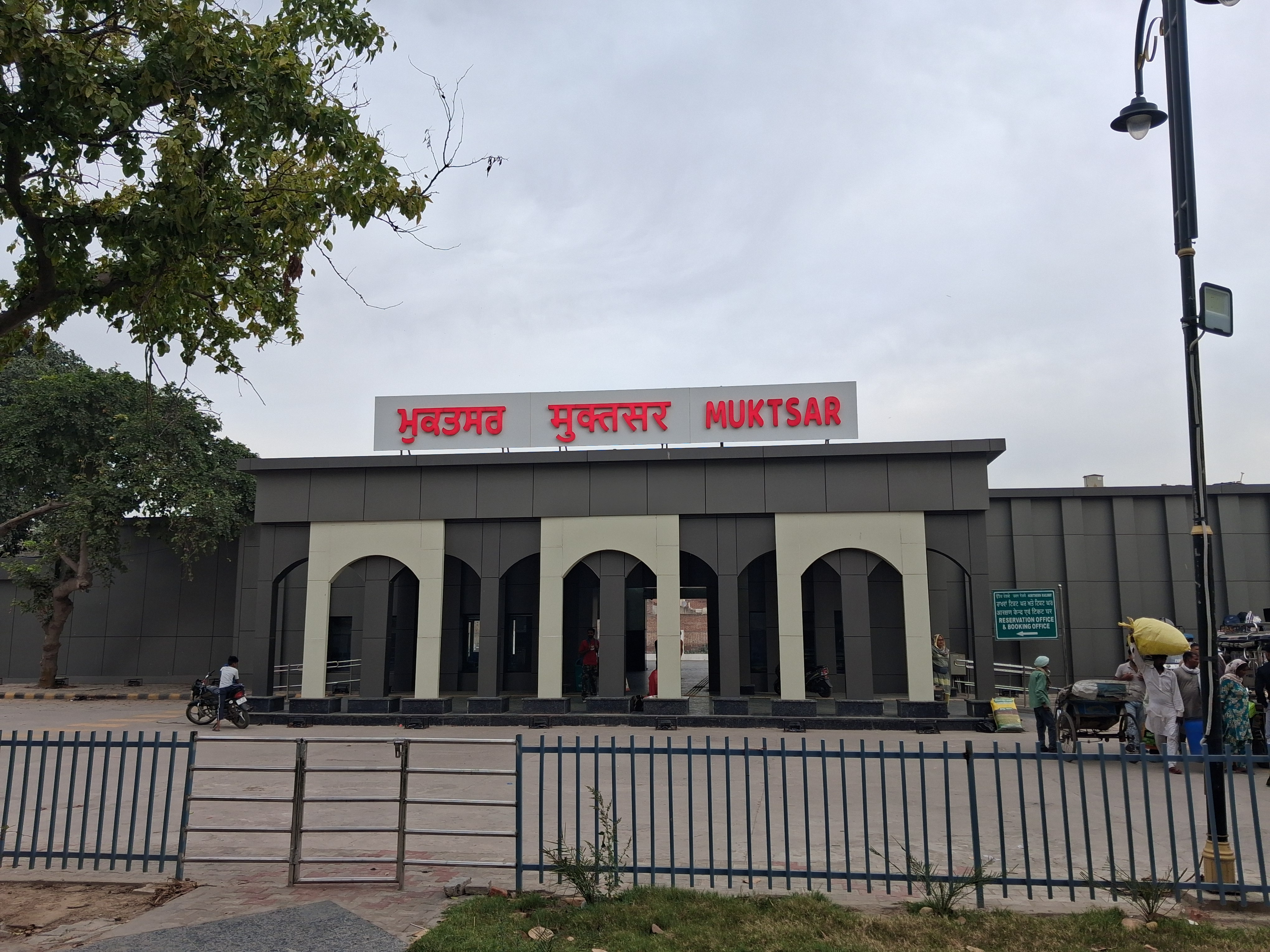

General information
- Location: Bura Gujjar Rd, Sri Muktsar Sahib, Punjab; India
- Coordinates: 30°28′43″N 74°30′53″E
- Elevation: 199 metres (653 ft)
- System: Indian Railway
- Owner: Indian Railways
- Operator: Northern Railway
- Line: Fazilka–Kotkapura line
- Platforms: 1
- Tracks: 3 nos 5 ft 6 in (1,676 mm) broad gauge

Construction
- Structure type: Standard on ground
- Parking: Yes
- Accessible: Wheelchair ramp

Other information
- Status: Functioning
- Station code: MKS
- Division(s): Firozpur

Passengers
- 2018: 1550 per day
Location
- Location within Punjab

(Station code: MKS) City's railway station is located on Bura Gujjar road, Sri Muktsar Sahib in the Indian state of Punjab and serves Sri Muktsar Sahib city which is the administrative headquarter of the district. Sri Muktsar Sahib railway station falls under Firozpur railway division of Northern Railway zone of Indian Railways.

== Overview ==
Sri Muktsar Sahib railway station is located at an elevation of 199 metres (653 ft). This station is located on the single track, 5 ft 6 in (1,676 mm) broad gauge, Kotkapura–Fazilka line.

== Electrification ==
Sri Muktsar Sahib railway station is situated on single track DMU line. The electrification of the single track BG Kotkapura-Fazilka line is in the pipeline.

== Amenities ==
Sri Muktsar Sahib railway station has 4 booking windows and all basic amenities like drinking water, public toilets, sheltered area with adequate seating. There is one platforms at the station and one foot overbridge (FOB).
