= Mandalgarh railway station =

Railway station in Rajasthan, India

Mandalgarh

General information
- Location: Mandalgarh, Bhilwara district, Rajasthan; India
- Coordinates: 25.194138°N 75.080979°E
- Elevation: 382 metres (1,253 ft)
- System: Indian Railways station
- Owner: Indian Railways
- Operator: West Central Railway
- Line: Chittaurgarh–Kota line
- Platforms: 1
- Tracks: 1

Construction
- Structure type: Standard (on ground station)
- Parking: Yes

Other information
- Status: Functioning
- Station code: MLGH
- Zone(s): West Central Railway
- Division(s): Kota
Location
- Location within India Location within Rajasthan

Mandalgarh railway station is a railway station in Bhilwara district, Rajasthan. Its code is MLGH. It serves Mandalgarh town. The station consists of a single platform. Passenger, Express and Superfast trains halt here.
