= Grant Road (Los Alamos, New Mexico) =

Historical wagon road and trail in New Mexico

- U.S. National Register of Historic Places
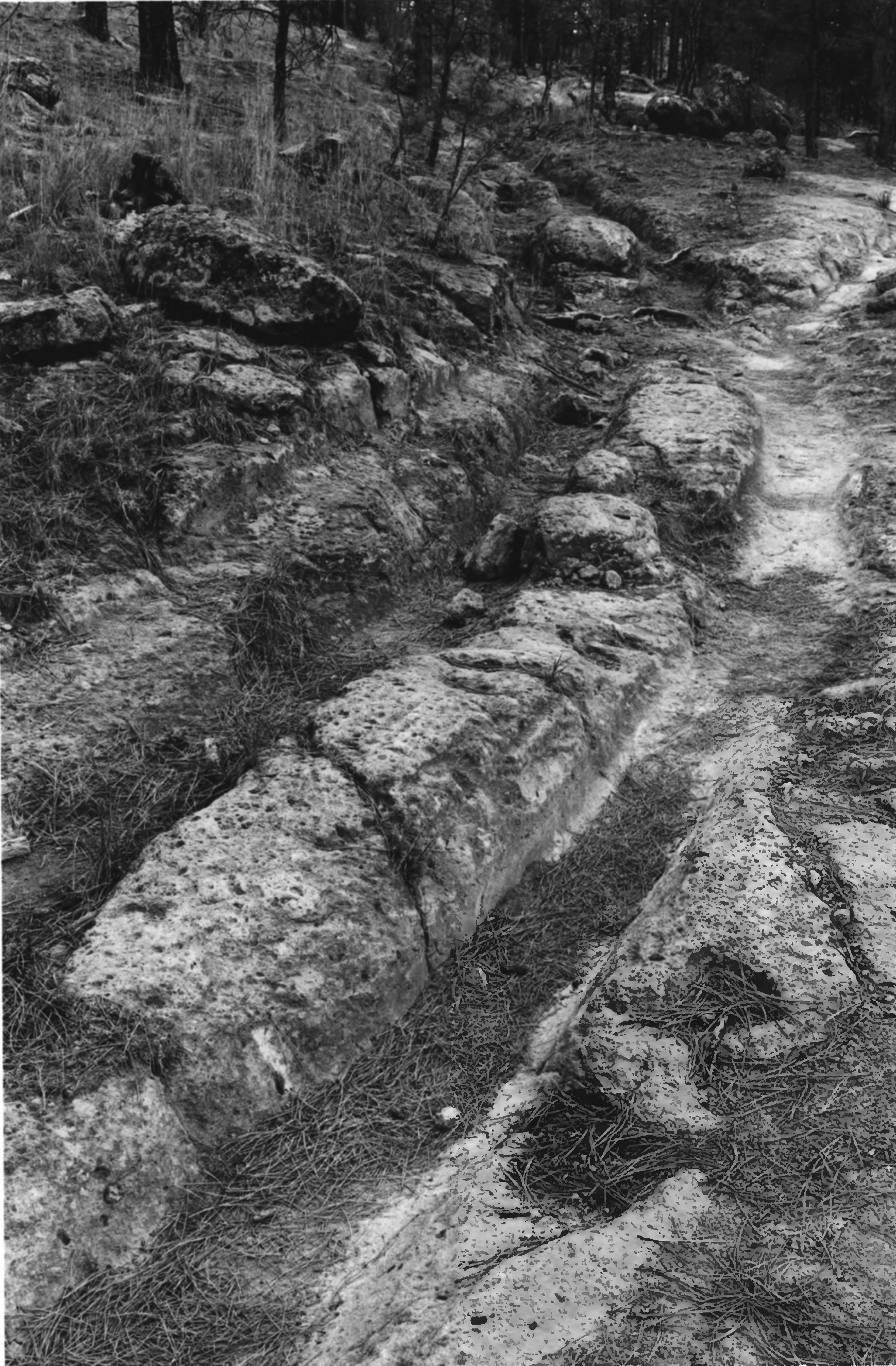
- A section of the Grant Road

- Location within New Mexico
- Location: Approx. 131 ft. N of the NE corner of the jct. of Diamond Dr. and San Ildefonso Rd., Los Alamos, New Mexico
- Coordinates: 35°53′57″N 106°17′54″W
- Area: less than one acre
- Built: circa 1887
- Built by: Anglo and Hispanic homesteaders
- Architectural style: 3,740-foot long road with one homestead structure
- MPS: Homestead and Ranch School Era Roads and Trails of Los Alamos, New Mexico MPS
- NRHP reference No.: 03001409
- Added to NRHP: January 14, 2004

The Grant Road in Los Alamos, New Mexico, known today as Dot Grant Trail, and also New Mexico Laboratory of Anthropology Trail # 89103, is a historic wagon road, now a hiking trail, which was listed on the National Register of Historic Places in 2004. The trail was named for Ottie Oman "Dot" Grant, an Anglo homestead owner originally from Colorado who had bought an existing Hispanic homestead to support his agricultural lifestyle year round.

The Grant historic wagon trail was part of a system of roads and trails used for transportation and horses on the Pajarito Plateau of Northern New Mexico. The terrain is rugged and remote. There were ten historic roads in the area including the Grant Road which served the Grant Farm, and connected with two other major access roads on Pajarito Plateau.

The trail is used now as a hiking and mountain biking trail. The soft tuff underlying the trail is still deeply rutted from years of wagon use.

== History ==
For centuries, the local Indigenous peoples used the Pajarito Plateau as a resource during certain seasons of the year. The earliest evidence that archaeologists have found of use by Paleo-Indians dating back to 9500 BC to 8000 BC, and to the Archaic period (2000 BC to 600 AD). Artifacts such as small stone hearths, knapped stone projectile points, and scatters of Archaic period lithic fragments are evidence that the area had short-term use. Evidence of seasonal use was also found dating between 600 AD and 1150 AD.

Beginning in 1150 AD to 1550 AD the Ancestral Puebloan people and later the Puebloan people occupied the area; there they built modestly sized farmsteads where they practiced agriculture and also hunting and gathering. Larger scale pueblos on Pajarito Plateau. There is no evidence that the Spaniards who arrived in New Mexico in 1592, used the area, nor is there any evidence of use by any other European peoples at the time until the mid-19th century.

In 1846, the United States participated in the Conquest of New Mexico, during the Mexican-American War, which was the start of permanent use of the plateau by settlers. The system of trails and roads in the area were developed more fully between 1887 and 1943 by the local Hispanic and Anglo settlers in the rugged plateau landscape, now known as Los Alamos. The Hispanic homesteaders used these trails and roads seasonally to haul water and products to market, and herd livestock during grazing season.

=== 20th century use ===
1913 marks the first appearance of Grant Road on a United States Forest Service map. At that time, the road provided a means of approach to Rendija Canyon and Bayo Canyon as well as to the homesteads in the Barranca and North mesa areas in the western lowlands. In 1915, a 24-year old Hispanic homesteader named Ramon Martinez applied for a use-permit to homestead the area for himself, his wife and child to live a life similar to other Hispanic homesteaders. He used the homestead seasonally, returning to the lower altitude valley below in the fall, then moved back up to the homestead each spring. In 1925, Ramon and Adelaida Roybal purchased the homestead from Martinez for $500. Five years later it was sold to Dot Grant for $300 to establish a permanent home. When Ottie Oman "Dot" Grant, an Anglo homestead owner from Colorado bought the existing Hispanic homestead and the associated trail to support his agricultural lifestyle year round (unlike his neighbors who used their land seasonally), the road was a means to provide access to his property. Grant married Emelina Garcia, from the Espanola Valley. He acquired grazing rights, raised cattle and chickens as well as growing a diverse variety of crops. He sold meat, eggs and vegetables to the Los Alamos Ranch School and in the markets of Santa Fe.

The road's first major period of 20th century significance was from 1920-1924, when the Los Alamos Ranch School was first built and the area was used for the training of boys in outdoor skills including maintaining the trails. The most significant year of use of the Grant Road was 1943 for exploration and settlement when the Los Alamos Laboratory was under construction, and continued through the years of the Manhattan Project when the first atomic bomb was being built. Use continued until about 1949. This period abruptly ended the agricultural lifestyle of Ottie Oman "Dot Grant during which all "individual homesteads and homestead access roads were condemned, bringing to a close the rural character and agricultural economy of the area."

The site's 2003-dated National Register nomination document identifies its southern end as being located "Approx. 131 ft. N of the NE corner of the jct. of Diamond Dr. and San Ildefonso Rd." However the roadways and intersection have changed. At the time of the nomination, the homestead road was considered to be "well preserved."

It was entered into the registry of historic places on January 14, 2004. Grant Road is considered to be historically significant at the local level by the NHRP per Criterion A as a settlement and transportation route, and per the Homestead and Ranch School Era Roads and Trails of Los Alamos, New Mexico.

=== Current use ===
The road was the access route to a historic homestead located along the trail, the Guaje Pines Cemetery is located near the northern end. Today Grant Road is now used as a recreational hiking trail. It is also used as a mountain biking trail that connects the Perimeter trail to Rendija Canyon and the Cabra Loop trail. Additionally, it can be used as access to the Bayo Canyon Trail, the Bridges Trail and to Three Bears/Guaje Road. The ascent along the trail is 207 feet, and the descent section is -61 feet with a total altitude differential of 146 feet. The trail head begins at 7,115 feet in altitude and the end of the trail is at 7,261 feet.

== Trivia ==
A scene from the 2023 film, Oppenheimer, was filmed on the Dot Grant Trail.
