= Brajrajnagar railway station =

Railway station in Odisha, India

Brajrajnagar

General information
- Location: Brajrajnagar, Odisha; India
- Coordinates: 21°49′21″N 83°55′27″E
- System: Indian Railways station
- Owner: Ministry of Railways, Indian Railways
- Line: Tatanagar–Bilaspur section
- Platforms: 3
- Tracks: 3

Construction
- Structure type: Standard (on ground)
- Parking: No

Other information
- Status: Functioning
- Station code: BRJN
- Zone(s): South East Central Railway
- Division(s): Bilaspur
Location
- Location within India Location within Odisha

Brajrajnagar railway station is a railway station on the South East Central Railway network in the state of Odisha, India. It serves Brajrajnagar town. Its code is BRJN. It has three platforms. Passenger, Express and Superfast trains halt at Brajrajnagar railway station.

== Trains ==
- Howrah–Ahmedabad Superfast Express
- Hirakud Superfast Express
- Kalinga Utkal Express
- Puri–Jodhpur Express
- Howrah–Mumbai Mail
- Azad Hind Express
- South Bihar Express

== See also ==
- Jharsuguda district
