= Asalpur Jobner railway station =

Railway station in Jaipur, Rajasthan, India

Asalpur Jobner

General information
- Location: Asalpur, Jaipur district, Rajasthan; India
- Coordinates: 26.900119°N 75.424153°E
- System: Indian Railways station
- Owner: Indian Railways
- Operator: North Western Railway
- Line: Jaipur–Ahmedabad line
- Platforms: 3
- Tracks: 3

Construction
- Structure type: Standard (on ground station)
- Parking: Yes

Other information
- Status: Functioning
- Station code: JOB
- Zone(s): North Western Railway
- Division(s): Jaipur
Location
- Location within Rajasthan Location within India

Asalpur Jobner railway station is a railway station in Jaipur district, Rajasthan. Its code is JOB. It serves Asalpur village and Jobner town. The station consists of 3 platforms. Passenger, Express and Superfast trains halt here.
