= Jam Jodhpur railway station =

Railway station in Gujarat, India

Jam Jodhpur

General information
- Location: Jam Jodhpur, Gujarat; India
- Coordinates: 21°54′25″N 70°01′53″E
- Elevation: 101 metres (331 ft)
- System: Indian Railways station
- Owner: Indian Railways
- Operator: Western Railway
- Line: Porbandar–Jetalsar section
- Platforms: 2
- Tracks: 4
- Connections: Auto stand

Construction
- Structure type: Standard (on-ground station)
- Parking: No
- Cycle facilities: No

Other information
- Status: Functioning
- Station code: JDH
- Zone(s): Western Railway
- Division(s): Bhavnagar
Location
- Location within India Location within Gujarat

Jam Jodhpur railway station is a small station in Jamnagar district, Gujarat. Its code is JDH. It serves Jam Jodhpur city. The station consists of two platforms. The platforms are not well sheltered. It lacks many facilities including water and sanitation.

== Major trains ==
- Porbandar–Somnath Passenger
- Porbandar–Santragachi Kavi Guru Express
- Rajkot–Porbandar Express
