= Kuneran =

- Village
- Location within Himachal Pradesh Location within India
- Coordinates: 31.7337°N 76.0446°E
- Country: India
- State: Himachal Pradesh

Area
  - Total: 152 ha (380 acres)
- Elevation: 369 m (1,211 ft)

Population (2001)
  - Total: 1,500
  - Density: 990/km^{2} (2,600/sq mi)
- Time zone: UTC+5:30 (IST)

Kuneran is a village in the Ghanari tehsil of Una district in the Indian state of Himachal Pradesh.

== Geography ==
Kuneran is located approximately 40 km from the town of Una. Nearby villages include Dera Baba Nanak, Dharamshala, Daulatpur and Amb. The village covers 152 hectares (375.6 acres). Daulatpur is the nearest town to Kuneran Nichla

== Culture ==
The Chintpurni Goddess Temple, Barbhag Singh, Dera Baba Rudru, Jogi Panga, and Shiv Bari temples are notable landmarks around the village, holding religious significance to many of its inhabitants.

== Transport ==
Kuneran is most easily accessed by the Chintpurni Marg Railway station Kuneran.

== Demographics ==
Devanagiri is the local language.

== Climate ==
In winter the climate is cool and woolen clothes are required. In summer, the climate is hot and cotton clothes are required as from July to September, it is rainy and humid.

== Demographics ==
As of 2001, the Census showed that Kuneran had a population of 1,500. Males constitute 40% of the population and females 60%. Kuneran has a literacy rate of about 82%.

About 299 houses are found in Kuneran Nichla village.
