= Dulehar =

- Village
- Interactive map of Dulehar
- Country: India
- State: Himachal Pradesh
- District: Una

Population
  - Total: 5,000

Languages
  - Official: Hindi
- Time zone: UTC+5:30 (IST)
- PIN: 176601
- Vehicle registration: HP-20, HP-80
- Assembly Seat: Haroli
- Nearest city: Una Bilaspur Hamirpur Dharamshala Chandigarh Shimla
- Lok Sabha: Hamirpur

Dulehar is an approximately 600- to 700-year-old village situated in the foothills of the Himalayas, more specifically, Sivalik Hills of Himachal Pradesh, India. Primarily a Doad Rajput settlement and holds special importance in its region since old times. It has four entry and exit roads (which is unique because it has separate localities for every caste) which meet at a central location called Chaupal and has its own Thakur Dwara Lord Krishna Temple. The majority of the population work in agriculture.

There are also number of Joshi families in this village believed to be originally from Maharashtra, who came to fight the invader Ahmad Shah Durrani in the Battle of Panipat (1761).

On 27 March 2016 the former Chief Minister Shri Virbhadra Singh announced Sub-Tehsil at Dulehar.

The Government School of Dulehar has recently completed its 100th year. The school was started in 1913 and it is one of the oldest school in the Haroli subdivision.

Mandir of Baba Gosain Dayal is also situated in village dulehar in the midst of village, name "choukhandi" There are so many mandirs in the village related to religion of the people
