= Joh =

Joh, JOH or Joh. may refer to:

== People ==
- Juan Orlando Hernández (JOH, born 1968), former president of Honduras
- Joh Makini (born 1980), Tanzanian hip hop recording artist and composer
- Laura Joh Rowland (born 1953), American author
- Tho Joh Heftye, an alias of Thomas Johannessen Heftye (1822–1886), Norwegian businessman, politician and philanthropist

=== Given name ===
- Joh Bailey, Australian hair stylist
- Joh Bjelke-Petersen (1911–2005), Australian politician
- Joh Mizuki (1938–1991), Japanese actor
- Joh Sasaki (born 1950), Japanese writer and journalist
- Joh Shaw (born 1982), Australian snowboarder

=== Surname ===
- Araki Joh, Japanese manga artist
- Asami Jō (born 1975), Japanese pornographic actress
- Mary Kim Joh (1904–2005), Korean-American composer
- Masako Jō (born 1978), Japanese voice actress
- Tiffany Joh (born 1986), American professional golfer
- Wonhee Anne Joh, South Korean author, professor, lecturer
- Joh Hyun, South Korean novelist
- Joh Keun-shik, South Korean film director and screenwriter
- Joh Sung-wook, South Korean professor of finance

==== Abbreviation ====
- Johan (given name)
- Johannes
- John (disambiguation)

== Companies ==
- Joh. Enschedé, a Dutch printing company
- Joh. Johannson, a Norwegian wholesaling company
- Joh. Loetz Witwe,an art glass manufacturer
- Joh. C. Tecklenborg, a German shipbuilding company
- Thos. Joh. Heftye & Søn, a Norwegian bank company
- Weingut Joh. Jos. Prüm, a German wine grower and producer

== Other uses ==
- Joh, Una, a village in Himachal Pradesh, India
- Joh Yowza, a fictional character in the Star Wars franchise
- Jerusalem Open House, an LGBT organization
- Joint Operations Headquarters of the Sri Lankan military
- Journal of Olympic History of the International Society of Olympic Historians
- Johnston railway station, in Pembrokeshire, Wales
