= Joh, Una =

- Village
- Coordinates: 31.827380°N 76.002538°E
- Country: India
- State: Himachal Pradesh
- District: Una
- Tehsil: Amb

Joh (pronounced jooh) is a village located in Una district, in the Indian state of Himachal Pradesh. Joh's population was 851 as of 2011, of which 416 were male and 435 female. The village is located 15 km (9.3 mi) from the taluk headquarters of Amb and 53 km (33 mi) from the district headquarters of Una. The village is also near Pong Dam and Chintpurni temple.

The nearest railway station is Daulatpur Chowk, 8.4 km (5.2 mi) from the village. Trains connect it to New Delhi.
