= Bangana town =

Bangana
- Tehsil
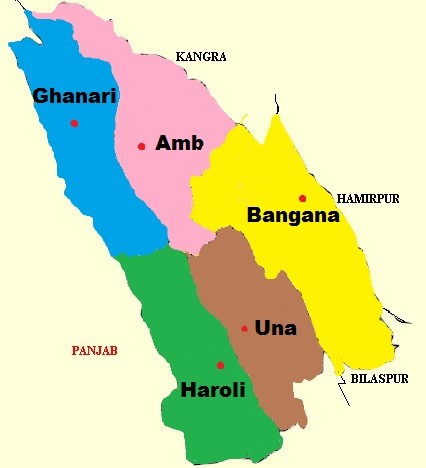

- Location in Una; Himachal Pradesh, India
- Coordinates: 31.6138°N 76.3579°E
- Country: India
- State: Himachal Pradesh
- District: Una

Government
  - Type: Government of Himachal Pradesh
  - Body: Tehsil
- Elevation: 630 m (2,070 ft)

Population
  - Total: 4,000

Languages
  - Official: Hindi
- Time zone: UTC+5:30 (IST)
- PIN: 174307
- Telephone code: 01975
- Vehicle registration: HP 78
- Nearest city: Una
- Vidhan Sabha constituency: Kuthlehar (Bangana)
- Civic agency: Tehsil
- Climate: Hot and humid. (Köppen)
- Avg. winter temperature: 10 °C (50 °F)

Bangana is a Tehsil of Una District in the state of Himachal Pradesh, India. It is located in the foothills of Solah Singhi Dhar (Lower Himalayas) in Una District of Himachal Pradesh, India. Ancient forts are located on the top of hill. It is said that Maharaja Sansar Chand built those forts. Lahore can be seen from these forts with the help of telescopes. District headquarters is 28 km from here. Bangana has further two sub-tehsils Jol and Bihru

== History ==
Historically Bangana was a part of Kutlehar state. Rajput Rajas from Pal Dynasty had ruled this state. After Kutlehar state's annexation to Panjab, it becomes part of Kangra district until 1972. After Kangra was trifucated into three parts (Kangra, Hamirpur, Una) then it became part of Una and served as tehsil headquarter.

== Kutlehar Fort ==
There is a fort situated near Bangana. It is situated on a hill's top. Lahore can be seen with the help of a telescope from this fort. Dhauladhar mountain range can also be seen from this place.

== Geography ==
Generally, terrain is hilly as it lies under the Solah Singhi Dhar range.

== Transport ==
It is connected by road to all major towns of Himachal Pradesh. The nearest railway station is at Una and Nearest Airport is Kangra Airport.

== Education ==
There are many government and private schools here. Government Degree College Bangana is a higher education center here. While Una is the nearest education hub for the town.

== Tourism ==
- Raipur Maidan- Baba Garib Nath Mandir situated on the bank of Satluj River near Gobind Sagar reservoir is an attraction for tourists.
- Jogi Panga- Baba Rudranand's temple is a major pilgrimage center.
- Gobind Sagar reservoir- The scenery of the river plays a role as a backdrop for pre-wedding photography and drone photography.
- Dhayunsar Mahadev- Lord Shiva's ancient temple. Every year lakhs of devotees visit the temple.
- Kutlehar Fort- It is said that this fort was built by Kangra's great ruler Maharaja Sansar Chand, as Kutlehar was the smallest of all the Kangra Kingdom.

== Assembly constituency ==
Bangana comes under the area of Kutlehar Vidhan Sabha Constituency. Indian National Congress and Bharatiya Janta Party are major political parties here. Sh. Vivek Sharma (Vicku) from INC (Indian National Congress) is the current MLA of Kutlehar. He defeated Bharatiya Janta Party candidate in June 2024 Bye Elections.
