= Gagret =

- Town
- Location in Himachal Pradesh, India Gagret (India)
- Coordinates: 31.67°N 76.07°E
- Country: India
- State: Himachal Pradesh
- District: Una
- Elevation: 439 m (1,440 ft)

Population (2001)
  - Total: 3,180

Languages
  - Official: Hindi
- Time zone: UTC+5:30 (IST)
- Vehicle registration: HP 19AA

Gagret is a nagar panchayat in Tehsil Ghanari of Una district in the state of Himachal Pradesh, India. It is situated in plains of Jaswan valley of Una.

== Geography ==
Gagret is located at 31.67°N 76.07°E. It has an average elevation of 439 metres (1440 feet).

== Demographics ==
As of 2001 India census, Gagret had a population of 3180. Males constitute 53% of the population and females 47%. Gagret has an average literacy rate of 81%, higher than the national average of 59.5%: male literacy is 83%, and female literacy is 78%. In Gagret, 11% of the population is under 6 years of age.

== Places of interest ==
'Shivbari temple', also known as Shiv Drone Mandir is around 1 km from Gagret Chowk on Gagret to Bharwain road is an ancient temple.

'Bombay Picnic Spot' is nearby picnic destination which comprises a Hotel-restaurant and Amusement park. It is around 10 km from Gagret on way to Dhramshala.

‘Coffee House' is Ready to Welcome You When you Enter in Himachal Pradesh.

'Chhinmastika Dham', also known as Chintapurani Mata Mandir is famous religious place and is 22 km from Gagret. Other famous religious places are Dera Baba Bharbhag Sigh ji Nr. Amb, Sadashiv temple at Talmehra village. There is also a temple of Asha devi 2 km from Gagret on Hoshiarpur Road.

== Economy ==
Gagret is one of the fastest-developing towns in Himachal Pradesh, as many companies have established their manufacturing units in Gagret: Fewa Electrical Corporation (Fine Group), Tigaksha Metallics Pvt. Ltd. (Supermax Personal Care Pvt. Ltd.), Luminous India, MBD Group, Accurate Metals. to name a few. Gagret is also known for its wholesale steel market.

== Transport ==
Gagret is located at Amritsar-Leh National Highway (NH 03) and is 25 km from Hoshiarpur. District headquarters Una is 34 km from Gagret. Gagret is directly connected by roads with all nearby towns and villages. Its proximity to Punjab and preferred route from Punjab to Dharamshala, Mandi, Hamirpur, Kangra makes it a well-known town.

Railway Station: Nearest railway stations are Amb Andora (5 km), Daulatpur (14 km), Hoshiarpur (25 km), Una(35 km

Airport:Nearest airport is Gaggal Domestic Airport (77 km)

== Branches of Banks ==
Following are the banks which have their branch located at Gagret.

- State Bank of Patiala (located at Daulatpur road)
- State Bank of India (located at Hoshiarpur road, near Govt. High School Gagret)
- Punjab National Bank (located at Una road)
- The Kangra Central Cooperative Bank (located at Una road)
- HDFC Bank (located at Bharwain road)
- UCO Bank (located at Bharwain Road)
- Union Bank (near Bus stand Gagret)
- Himachal Gramin Bank ( located at Una Road)

== Communication ==
Gagret is also well connected with all the advance communication network. BSNL and all the private communication companies planted their network in city and nearby area. India post and other private courier companies has their branches here. Netplus & BSNL also provide broadband services here.
