= Kalruhi, Himachal Pradesh =

Coordinates: 31°46′N 76°24′E

Kalruhi Kalroohi
- village
- Interactive map of Kalruhi
- Country: India
- State: Himachal Pradesh
- District: Una district
- Tehsils: Amb

Government
  - Body: Village Panchayat

Languages
- Time zone: UTC+5:30 (IST)
- PIN: 177203
- Vehicle registration: HP-
- Civic agency: Village Panchayat

Kalruhi also known as Kalroohi, is a village situated in Una district of Himachal Pradesh, India. It is one of the populous village of Himachal Pradesh.

== Demographics ==
The village has a population of 1331 people of which 701 are males and 630 are females according to the 2011 Indian Census.
