= Sushma Sharma (politician) =

Indian politician

Sushma Sharma is an Indian politician and member of the Bhartiya Janta Party. Sharma was a member of the Himachal Pradesh Legislative Assembly from the Chintpurni constituency in Una district.

== Electoral performance ==
1998 Himachal Pradesh Legislative Assembly election: Chintpurni
Party	Candidate	Votes	%	±%
BJP	Parveen Sharma	12,764	37.11%	▲12.86
INC	Hari Dutt	12,111	35.21%	▲10.45
BSP	Ganesh Dutt	7,606	22.11%	▲18.48
HVC	Sushma Sharma	1,227	3.57%	New
Independent	Som Dutt	300	0.87%	New
Margin of victory		653	1.90%	▼15.56
Turnout		34,393	69.53%	▲2.24
Registered electors		50,192		▼0.09
BJP gain from Independent		Swing	▼5.11	

1993 Himachal Pradesh Legislative Assembly election: Chintpurni
Party	Candidate	Votes	%	±%
Independent	Hari Dutt	14,060	42.22%	New
INC	Ganesh Dutt	8,247	24.77%	▼10.91
BJP	Sushma Sharma	8,074	24.25%	▼21.08
BSP	Desh Deep	1,210	3.63%	▼10.56
Independent	Hans Raj	1,127	3.38%	New
JD	Chamel Singh	301	0.90%	New
Independent	Fazquir Chand Kahol	212	0.64%	New
Margin of victory		5,813	17.46%	▲7.80
Turnout		33,298	66.86%	▲5.14
Registered electors		50,238		▲2.24
Independent gain from BJP		Swing	▼3.10	

1990 Himachal Pradesh Legislative Assembly election: Chintpurni
Party	Candidate	Votes	%	±%
BJP	Sushma Sharma	13,619	45.33%	▲11.70
INC	Hari Dutt	10,718	35.67%	▼6.64
BSP	Desh Deep	4,265	14.20%	New
Independent	Chamel Singh	705	2.35%	New
JP	Kishori Lal	187	0.62%	New
INS(SCS)	Birbal	178	0.59%	New
Independent	Narinder Kumar Kalia	177	0.59%	New
Margin of victory		2,901	9.66%	▲0.97
Turnout		30,045	61.67%	▼1.51
Registered electors		49,138		▲32.07
BJP gain from INC		Swing	▲3.02	
