= Sudarshan Singh Babloo =

Indian politician

- Born: 1981 (age 44–45); Chintpurni, Una district, Maharashtra
- Occupation: Indian politician from Himachal Pradesh

Sudarshan Singh Babloo (born 1981) is an Indian politician from Himachal Pradesh. He is an MLA from Chintpurni Assembly constituency, which is reserved for Scheduled Caste community, in Una district. He won the 2022 Himachal Pradesh Legislative Assembly election representing the Indian National Congress.

== Early life and education ==
Babloo is from Chintpurni, Una District, Himachal Pradesh. He is the son of Nanak Singh. He studied Class 12 at Government Senior Secondary School, Thathal and passed in 2001 as a private candidate.

== Career ==
Babloo won from Chintpurni Assembly constituency representing the Indian National Congress in the 2022 Himachal Pradesh Legislative Assembly election. He polled 32,712 votes and defeated his nearest rival and sitting MLA, Balbir Singh of the Bharatiya Janata Party, by a margin of 4,858 votes. He was the state president of Congress Sewa Dal, the youth wing, and the Congress high command chose the new face ahead of former Minister Kuldip Kumar to contest the 2022 Assembly election.
