= Hyun (Korean name) =

Hyun (Korean: 현), also spelled Hyeon or Hyon, Hyoun, is a Korean surname and a Korean given name.

== As a surname ==
=== Overview ===
The family name Hyun is written with only one hanja (玄; 검을 현 geomeul hyeon) meaning "dark" or "mysterious". The 2000 South Korean Census found 81,807 people and 25,547 households with this family name. In a study by the National Institute of the Korean Language based on 2007 application data for South Korean passports, it was found that 80.5% of people with this surname spelled it in Latin letters as Hyun in their passports. Another 14.9% spelled it as Hyeon, and 2.2% as Hyoun. Rarer alternative spellings (the remaining 2.4%) included Heon and Hyean.

=== Clans ===
The surviving clans (origin of a clan lineage, not necessarily the actual residence of the clan members) as of 2000 included:

Family seal of the Yeonju Hyon clan

1. Yeonju (Nyongbyon County), North Pyongan Province: 59,096 people and 18,686 households. Yeonju is an old name of Nyongbyon County, and is located in territory which became part of North Korea after the division of Korea. The clan members claim descent from Hyeon Dam-yun (현담윤; 玄覃胤), who held the position of munha sirang pyeongjangsa (문하시랑평장사; 門下侍郞平章事) in the Secretariat-Chancellery under Myeongjong of Goryeo (r. 1170–1197).
2. Seongju, North Gyeongsang Province: 4,938 people and 1,438 households. They are a branch of the Yeonju clan, claiming descent from Hyeon Dam-yun via Hyeon Gyu (현규; 玄珪), who held the position of gunsu (군수; 郡守) for Gobu County (고부군; 古阜郡), Jeolla Province (today Jeongeup, North Jeolla Province) under Sejong of Joseon (r. 1418–1450).
3. Gyeongju, North Gyeongsang Province: 3,534 people and 1,099 households. They claim descent from Hyeon Myeong (현명, 玄命), an official under Injo of Joseon (r. 1623–1649).
4. Yeongju, North Gyeongsang Province: 1,724 people and 531 households.
5. Changwon, South Gyeongsang Province: 1,261 people and 376 households. They are a branch of the Yeonju clan, claiming descent from Hyeon Dam-yun via his son Hyeon Deok-yu (현덕유; 玄德裕), who was also an official under Myeongjong of Goryeo.
6. Other clans: 12,343 people and 3,387 households.
7. Unknown clans: 172 people and 30 households.

=== People ===
Notable people with the surname Hyun include:

- Hyun Bong-sik (born 1984), South Korean actor
- Hyun Byung-chul (born 1974), South Korean cyclist
- Hyon Chol-hae (1934–2022), North Korean general
- Hyon Hak-bong, North Korean diplomat
- Hyun Hee (born 1976), South Korean retired épée fencer
- Hyun Hong-choo (1940–2017), South Korean lawyer, politician, diplomat
- Hyun Hye-sung (born 1986), South Korean field hockey player
- Insoo Hyun (born c. 1970), Korean American bioethics professor
- Hyun In-taek (born 1954), South Korean politician
- Hyun Jae-hyun (born 1949), South Korean businessman
- Hyun Jae-myung (1902–1960), South Korean composer
- Hyun Jin-geon (1900–1943), Korean author
- Hyun Jin-young (born Huh Hyun-seok, 1971), South Korean singer
- Hyun Joo-yup (born 1975), South Korean basketball player
- Hyun Jung-hwa (born 1969), South Korean table tennis player
- Hyun Jyu-ni (born 1985), South Korean actress
- Hyun Ki-young (born 1941), South Korean author
- Hyun Kil-un (1940–2020), South Korean writer
- Martin Hyun (born 1979), German ice hockey player and writer
- Hyon Mu-gwang (1913–1992), North Korean politician
- Peter Hyun (1906–1993), American director and writer
- Hyun Seung-hee (born 1996), South Korean singer and actress, member of girl group Oh My Girl
- Hyun Seung-min (born 1999), South Korean actress
- Hyun Song-in (born 1967), South Korean rower
- Hyon Song-wol (born 1977), North Korean pop singer
- Hyun Sook-hee (born 1973), South Korean judo practitioner
- Hyun Soong-jong (1919–2020), South Korean politician
- Hyeon Taeghwan (born 1964), South Korean scientist
- Hyun Woo-sung (born 1979), South Korean actor
- Hyon Yong-chol (1949–2015), North Korean general
- Hyun Young-min (born 1979), South Korean football player

== As a given name ==
People with the given name Hyun include:

=== Entertainers ===
- Joo Hyun (born Joo Il-choon, 1943), South Korean actor
- Woo Hyun (born 1964), South Korean actor
- Lee Hyun (born 1983), South Korean singer

=== Footballers ===
- Cho Hyun (footballer) (born 1974), South Korean midfielder (K-League)
- Choi Hyun (born 1978), South Korean goalkeeper (K-League)
- Yoo Hyun (born 1984), South Korean goalkeeper (K-League)
- Park Hyun (born 1988), South Korean midfielder (K-League Challenge)
- Kim Hyun (footballer) (born 1993), South Korean striker (K-League 2)

=== Other ===
- Choe Hyon (1907–1982), North Korean general and politician
- Yoon Hyun (born 1966), South Korean judo practitioner
- Joh Hyun (born 1969), South Korean novelist
- Jung Hyun (born 1994), South Korean baseball player
- Chung Hyeon (born 1996), South Korean tennis player
- Na Hyun, South Korean screenwriter and director

== Fictional characters ==
- Guido-Hyun, a protagonist from The Haunted House animated series

== See also ==
- List of Korean family names
- List of Korean given names
