= Hyun =

Hyun may refer to:

- Hyun (Korean name)
- Hyun or Hyeon, a romanization of the name of a type of province of Korea
- Hyun (Armenian letter)
