= IIU =

IIU may refer to:

- Independent Investigation Unit, in Manitoba, Canada
- Indus International University, in Haroli, Himachal Pradesh, India
- INTI International University, in Malaysia
- Isles International University, formerly Irish International University
- International Investment & Underwriting, private equity firm founded by Dermot Desmond
