= Badehar Urf Dehlan =

- Village
- Interactive map of Badehar Urf Dehlan
- Country: India
- State: Himachal Pradesh
- District: Una district

Population
  - Total: 2,487
- Time zone: UTC+5:30 (IST)
- Postal code: 174306

Badehar Urf Dehlan is a village situated in Una Tehsil of Una district, Himachal Pradesh, India. It is one of the largest village in Himachal Pradesh.

== Demographics ==
Badehar Urf Dehlan has a population of 2,487 people out of which 1,221 are males and 1,266 are females according to the 2011 Indian Census.
