= Pubowal =

- village
- Location in Himachal Pradesh, India Pubowal (India)
- Coordinates: 31.30°N 76.20°E
- Country: India
- State: Himachal Pradesh
- District: Una
- Elevation: 369 m (1,211 ft)

Population (2011)
  - Total: 2,154

Languages
  - Official: Hindi, Punjabi
- Time zone: UTC+5:30 (IST)
- PIN: 174503
- Telephone code: 91 - 01975 - 278.....
- Vehicle registration: HP-20, HP-72, HP-80

Pubowal is a village in Una district in the Indian state of Himachal Pradesh.

== History ==
The village is named after Pubo Mann, a commander in the reign of Jaswan king, Pubo won a major battle fighting with Nadir Shah's military in 1739 and was awarded the land. Originally from Bathinda, Punjab, Pubo brought his family, along with members of the Brahmin and other castes, to settle this village in the 1740s. He established the area as distinct village for the first time.

The number of Brahmin residents has given rise to the production of laureates from the village at the time when nearby all villages comprised illiterate populations. After some time, the village was subdivided, leading to the creation of Bilna, Haleran, Aujle and Badewale. Those newer villages got their own panchayats recently.

== Geography ==
Pubowal has an average elevation of 498 metres in the district Una of Himachal Pradesh which lies in its south western part. Punjabi, Hindi, are common languages spoken.

== Culture ==
Pubowal has many temples and is often visited by devotees from nearby towns and cities. The Thakurdwara temple - dedicated to Krishna, Shiva and Hanuman - is located at the highest point. Shiv Mandir, another Shiva temple, and Shera Bali Mata Mandir also exist. Mata Mandir is near to Chougaan also called 'Panj Piri'. Other prominent places of worship include a Dera Baba Gidgida Sahib Ji, Dera Baba Shri Chand Ji maharaj, Gurudwara, Ravidaas Mandir and Sidh Chanan Mandir.

== Education ==
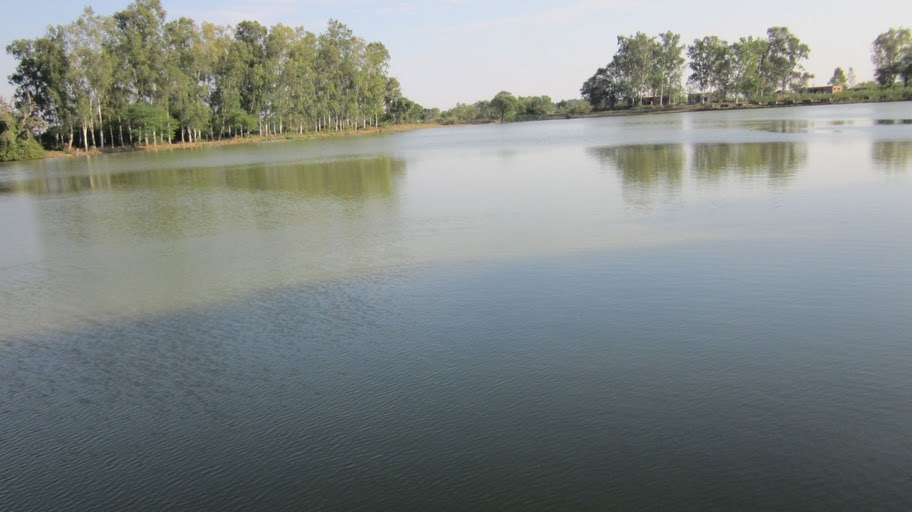
Ramsar

The village has four anganwadis and three primary schools. Some of the schools in the village are: Govt Sen. Sec. School, Govt Primary School. All schools are affiliated to the HPBSE board.

== Climate ==
Pubowal has a sub-tropical continental monsoon climate characterized by a seasonal rhythm: hot summers, slightly cold winters, unreliable rainfall and great variation in temperature (0 °C to 40 °C). In winter, frost sometimes occurs during December and January. The village also receives occasional winter rains from the west.

Average temperature

- Summer: The temperature in summer may rise to a maximum of 42 °C. Temperatures generally remain between 25 °C and 40 °C.
- Autumn: In autumn, the temperature may rise to a maximum of 30 °C. Temperatures usually remain between 14° and 25° in autumn. The minimum temperature is around 10 °C.
- Winter: Winters are quite cool and it can sometimes get quite chilly in Pubowal. Average temperatures in winter (November to February) remain at (max) 3 °C to 14 °C and (min) -5 °C to 5 °C.
- Spring: The climate remains quite pleasant during the spring season. Temperatures vary between (max) 12 °C to 20 °C and (min) 6 °C to 15 °C.

== Transport ==
Local transport in Pubowal is by bus or private vehicles. The frequent bus service is available to Una and Nangal, which are the two cities nearest to Pubowal. Buses ply frequently on the circular road surrounding the villages. Taxis are also an option for out of village trips. Locals typically traverse the village on foot. Pubowal is well-connected by road. Nearest railroad is in Jaijon, Punjab and nearest airport is in Chandigarh about 125 km.

== Geographical location ==
Pubowal is about 355 km away from New Delhi, 17 km from Una and 25 km from Nangal.
