= Balbir Singh (Himachal Pradesh politician) =

Indian politician

MLA, Himachal Pradesh Legislative Assembly
- In office 2017–2022
- Preceded by: Kuldip Kumar
- Succeeded by: Sudarshan Babloo
- Constituency: Chintpurni

Personal details
- Born: 8 October 1963 (age 62) Baroa, Una, Himachal Pradesh
- Party: Bhartiya Janta Party
- Parent(s): Gangoo Ram; Roshani Devi

Balbir Singh (born 8 October 1963) is an Indian politician, who currently serves as Member of Legislative Assembly from Chintpurni constituency. Balbir Singh won from Chintpurni constituency in 2017 state assembly elections.

== Early life and education ==
Balbir Singh was born on 8 October 1963 in Baroa, Una, Himachal Pradesh to Gangoo Ram and Roshani Devi.

Balbir Singh graduated from National College Amb, HP.

== Politics ==
Balbir Singh active politics started from 2003. He became president of BJP mandal in 2003. He was president of BJP Una district from 2008 to 2012. He became president of BJP S.C. morcha from 2013 to 2016.

He previously won Himachal Pradesh Legislative Assembly Election in 2007 and become member of various house committees.

Then in 2017, he was elected to the thirteenth Himachal Pradesh Legislative Assembly in December, 2017.
