= Chintpurni Assembly constituency =

Legislative Assembly constituency in Himachal Pradesh State, India

Coordinates: 31.81°N 76.1°E

Chintpurni
- Constituency No. 41 for the Himachal Pradesh Legislative Assembly

Constituency details
- Country: India
- Region: North India
- State: Himachal Pradesh
- District: Una
- Lok Sabha constituency: Hamirpur
- Established: 1972
- Total electors: 84,013
- Reservation: SC

Member of Legislative Assembly
- 14th Himachal Pradesh Legislative Assembly
- Incumbent Sudarshan Singh Babloo
- Party: Indian National Congress
- Elected year: 2022

Chintpurni is one of the 68 assembly constituencies of Himachal Pradesh a northern Indian state. Chintpurni is also part of Hamirpur, Himachal Pradesh Lok Sabha constituency.

== Members of the Legislative Assembly ==
Year	Member	Picture	Party
1972	Onkar Chand		Indian National Congress
1977	Hans Raj		Janata Party
1982	Hans Raj Akrot		Indian National Congress
1985	Ganesh Dutt		Indian National Congress
1990	Sushma Sharma		Bharatiya Janata Party
1993	Hari Datt		Independent
1998	Parveen Sharma		Bharatiya Janata Party
2003	Rakesh Kalia		Indian National Congress
2007	Rakesh kalia		Indian National Congress
2012	Kuldip Kumar		Indian National Congress
2017	Balbir Singh		Bharatiya Janata Party
2022	Sudarshan Singh Babloo		Indian National Congress

== Election results ==
=== Assembly Election 2022 ===
2022 Himachal Pradesh Legislative Assembly election: Chintpurni
Party	Candidate	Votes	%	±%
INC	Sudarshan Singh Babloo	32,712	52.70%	▲11.78
BJP	Balbir Singh	27,854	44.87%	▼10.74
AAP	Ram Paul	767	1.24%	New
NOTA	Nota	355	0.57%	▼0.34
Margin of victory		4,858	7.83%	▼6.86
Turnout		62,072	73.88%	▼1.04
Registered electors		84,013		▲7.74
INC gain from BJP		Swing	▼2.91	

=== Assembly Election 2017 ===
2017 Himachal Pradesh Legislative Assembly election: Chintpurni
Party	Candidate	Votes	%	±%
BJP	Balbir Singh	32,488	55.61%	▲8.13
INC	Kuldip Kumar	23,909	40.92%	▼7.45
BSP	Ranjit Singh	621	1.06%	▼0.04
NOTA	None of the Above	534	0.91%	New
Margin of victory		8,579	14.68%	▲13.79
Turnout		58,422	74.92%	▲6.09
Registered electors		77,979		▲9.45
BJP gain from INC		Swing	▲7.24	

=== Assembly Election 2012 ===
2012 Himachal Pradesh Legislative Assembly election: Chintpurni
Party	Candidate	Votes	%	±%
INC	Kuldip Kumar	23,720	48.37%	▼7.20
BJP	Balbir Singh	23,282	47.48%	▲25.44
HLC	Ram Lok	662	1.35%	New
BSP	Bhagwan Dass Jassal	543	1.11%	▼2.49
Shivsena	Harmesh Chand	452	0.92%	New
AITC	Balwant Singh	290	0.59%	New
Margin of victory		438	0.89%	▼32.64
Turnout		49,038	68.83%	▼3.00
Registered electors		71,244		▲6.36
INC hold		Swing	▼7.20	

=== Assembly Election 2007 ===
2007 Himachal Pradesh Legislative Assembly election: Chintpurni
Party	Candidate	Votes	%	±%
INC	Rakesh Kalia	26,737	55.57%	▼4.78
BJP	Narender Sharma	10,602	22.03%	▼13.47
Independent	Shadi Lal	7,204	14.97%	New
BSP	Hari Dutt	1,732	3.60%	▲2.41
Independent	Jagjit Singh	1,348	2.80%	New
CPI	Joginder Singh	459	0.95%	New
Margin of victory		16,135	33.53%	▲8.70
Turnout		48,115	71.83%	▼2.43
Registered electors		66,985		▲12.93
INC hold		Swing	▼4.78	

=== Assembly Election 2003 ===
2003 Himachal Pradesh Legislative Assembly election: Chintpurni
Party	Candidate	Votes	%	±%
INC	Rakesh Kalia	26,581	60.35%	▲25.13
BJP	Praveen Sharma	15,640	35.51%	▼1.61
BSP	Thakur Ram Dass Katwal	522	1.19%	▼20.93
Independent	Rajender Sharma	416	0.94%	New
NCP	Col. Ramesh Chand Prashar	413	0.94%	New
SP	Ajit Kumar	385	0.87%	New
Margin of victory		10,941	24.84%	▲22.94
Turnout		44,048	74.36%	▲5.74
Registered electors		59,314		▲18.17
INC gain from BJP		Swing	▲23.23	

=== Assembly Election 1998 ===
1998 Himachal Pradesh Legislative Assembly election: Chintpurni
Party	Candidate	Votes	%	±%
BJP	Parveen Sharma	12,764	37.11%	▲12.86
INC	Hari Dutt	12,111	35.21%	▲10.45
BSP	Ganesh Dutt	7,606	22.11%	▲18.48
HVC	Sushma Sharma	1,227	3.57%	New
Independent	Som Dutt	300	0.87%	New
Margin of victory		653	1.90%	▼15.56
Turnout		34,393	69.53%	▲2.24
Registered electors		50,192		▼0.09
BJP gain from Independent		Swing	▼5.11	

=== Assembly Election 1993 ===
1993 Himachal Pradesh Legislative Assembly election: Chintpurni
Party	Candidate	Votes	%	±%
Independent	Hari Dutt	14,060	42.22%	New
INC	Ganesh Dutt	8,247	24.77%	▼10.91
BJP	Sushma Sharma	8,074	24.25%	▼21.08
BSP	Desh Deep	1,210	3.63%	▼10.56
Independent	Hans Raj	1,127	3.38%	New
JD	Chamel Singh	301	0.90%	New
Independent	Fazquir Chand Kahol	212	0.64%	New
Margin of victory		5,813	17.46%	▲7.80
Turnout		33,298	66.86%	▲5.14
Registered electors		50,238		▲2.24
Independent gain from BJP		Swing	▼3.10	

=== Assembly Election 1990 ===
1990 Himachal Pradesh Legislative Assembly election: Chintpurni
Party	Candidate	Votes	%	±%
BJP	Sushma Sharma	13,619	45.33%	▲11.70
INC	Hari Dutt	10,718	35.67%	▼6.64
BSP	Desh Deep	4,265	14.20%	New
Independent	Chamel Singh	705	2.35%	New
JP	Kishori Lal	187	0.62%	New
INS(SCS)	Birbal	178	0.59%	New
Independent	Narinder Kumar Kalia	177	0.59%	New
Margin of victory		2,901	9.66%	▲0.97
Turnout		30,045	61.67%	▼1.51
Registered electors		49,138		▲32.07
BJP gain from INC		Swing	▲3.02	

=== Assembly Election 1985 ===
1985 Himachal Pradesh Legislative Assembly election: Chintpurni
Party	Candidate	Votes	%	±%
INC	Ganesh Dutt	9,864	42.31%	▼3.47
BJP	Gulwant Singh	7,839	33.63%	▼4.27
Independent	Hans Raj	3,216	13.80%	New
Independent	Ram Lok	1,443	6.19%	New
Independent	Balwant Singh	308	1.32%	New
CPI	Ranjit Singh	269	1.15%	▼2.38
Independent	Sudesh Modgil	181	0.78%	New
Margin of victory		2,025	8.69%	▲0.81
Turnout		23,312	63.31%	▼0.11
Registered electors		37,205		▲7.95
INC hold		Swing	▼3.47	

=== Assembly Election 1982 ===
1982 Himachal Pradesh Legislative Assembly election: Chintpurni
Party	Candidate	Votes	%	±%
INC	Hans Raj	9,904	45.78%	▲10.37
BJP	Romesh Chander	8,199	37.90%	New
JP	Onkar Chand	1,938	8.96%	▼35.69
CPI	Rikhi Ram	765	3.54%	New
Independent	Harnam Singh	364	1.68%	New
LKD	Jeewn Ram Alias Bansi Lal	307	1.42%	New
Margin of victory		1,705	7.88%	▼1.36
Turnout		21,633	63.73%	▲11.63
Registered electors		34,465		▲3.05
INC gain from JP		Swing	▲1.13	

=== Assembly Election 1977 ===
1977 Himachal Pradesh Legislative Assembly election: Chintpurni
Party	Candidate	Votes	%	±%
JP	Hans Raj	7,636	44.65%	New
INC	Onkar Chand	6,055	35.41%	▼6.31
Independent	Roshan Lal	2,045	11.96%	New
Independent	Shankar Dass	770	4.50%	New
Independent	Balkrishan	480	2.81%	New
Independent	Ruder Datt Sharma	115	0.67%	New
Margin of victory		1,581	9.25%	▼4.09
Turnout		17,101	52.16%	▲4.43
Registered electors		33,444		▲14.66
JP gain from INC		Swing	▲2.94	

=== Assembly Election 1972 ===
1972 Himachal Pradesh Legislative Assembly election: Chintpurni
Party	Candidate	Votes	%	±%
INC	Onkar Chand	5,683	41.72%	New
INC(O)	Hans Raj	3,866	28.38%	New
Independent	Birbal	3,314	24.33%	New
Independent	Jagat Singh	512	3.76%	New
ABJS	Gulwant Singh	248	1.82%	New
Margin of victory		1,817	13.34%	
Turnout		13,623	48.19%	
Registered electors		29,168		
INC win (new seat)				

== See also ==
- Chintpurni
- Una district
- Hamirpur, Himachal Pradesh Lok Sabha constituency
