= Indus International University =

Coordinates: 31.326093°N 76.2595602°E

- Type: Private
- Established: 2010
- Academic affiliations: UGC
- Chancellor: Sudhir Kartha
- Vice-Chancellor: Sanjay Kumar Bahl
- Location: Bathu, Haroli, Himachal Pradesh, India
- Website: www.iiuedu.in

Indus International University (IIU) is a private not-for-profit university, located near the village Bathu in Haroli Tehsil, Una district, Himachal Pradesh, India. The university was established in 2010 by the Kartha Education Society through the Indus International University (Establishment & Regulation) Act, 2009.

== Schools and departments ==
The university comprises three schools:

- School of Engineering and Technology
  - Computer Science Engineering
  - Department of Civil Engineering
  - Department of Mechanical Engineering
- School of Sciences and Humanities
  - Department of Mathematics
  - Department of Physics
  - Department of Chemistry
  - Department of English
- School of Business and Management
  - Department of Business and Management
  - Department of Hospitality and Tourism Management

== Approval ==
Like all universities in India, Indus International University is recognised by the University Grants Commission (UGC), which has also sent an expert committee and accepted compliance of observation/deficiencies.
