= Una, Himachal Pradesh Assembly constituency =

Legislative Assembly constituency in Himachal Pradesh State, India

Coordinates: 31.47°N 76.27°E

Una
- Constituency No. 44 for the Himachal Pradesh Legislative Assembly

Constituency details
- Country: India
- Region: North India
- State: Himachal Pradesh
- District: Una
- Lok Sabha constituency: Hamirpur
- Established: 1967
- Total electors: 87,136
- Reservation: None

Member of Legislative Assembly
- 14th Himachal Pradesh Legislative Assembly
- Incumbent Satpal Singh Satti
- Party: Bharatiya Janata Party
- Elected year: 2022

Una Assembly constituency is one of the 68 assembly constituencies of Himachal Pradesh, a northern Indian state. Una is also part of Hamirpur, Himachal Pradesh Lok Sabha constituency.

== Members of Legislative Assembly ==
Year	Member	Picture	Party
1967	Parkash Chand		Indian National Congress
1972	Parkash Chand		Indian National Congress
1977	Des Raj		Janata Party
1982	Des Raj		Bharatiya Janata Party
1985	Virender Gautam		Indian National Congress
1990	Des Raj		Bharatiya Janata Party
1993	O. P. Rattan		Indian National Congress
1998	Virender Gautam		Indian National Congress
2003	Satpal Singh Satti		Bharatiya Janata Party
2007	Satpal Singh Satti		Bharatiya Janata Party
2012	Satpal Singh Satti		Bharatiya Janata Party
2017	Satpal Raizada		Indian National Congress
2022	Satpal Singh Satti		Bharatiya Janata Party

== Election results ==
=== Assembly Election 2022 ===
2022 Himachal Pradesh Legislative Assembly election: Una
Party	Candidate	Votes	%	±%
BJP	Satpal Singh Satti	33,974	50.05%	▲5.50
INC	Satpal Raizada	32,238	47.49%	▼2.12
AAP	Rajiv Gautam	737	1.09%	New
BSP	Ramesh Chand	341	0.50%	▼0.54
NOTA	Nota	240	0.35%	New
Independent	Chander Mohan	185	0.27%	New
Independent	Kamal Kumar	162	0.24%	New
Margin of victory		1,736	2.56%	▼2.50
Turnout		67,877	77.90%	▼1.60
Registered electors		87,136		▲9.59
BJP gain from INC		Swing	▲0.44	

=== Assembly Election 2017 ===
2017 Himachal Pradesh Legislative Assembly election: Una
Party	Candidate	Votes	%	±%
INC	Satpal Raizada	31,360	49.61%	▲8.79
BJP	Satpal Singh Satti	28,164	44.55%	▼5.03
Independent	Rajiv Gautam	1,723	2.73%	New
BSP	Ravi Kumar	659	1.04%	▼1.38
Margin of victory		3,196	5.06%	▼3.71
Turnout		63,213	79.50%	▲4.36
Registered electors		79,512		▲10.40
INC gain from BJP		Swing	▲0.02	

=== Assembly Election 2012 ===
2012 Himachal Pradesh Legislative Assembly election: Una
Party	Candidate	Votes	%	±%
BJP	Satpal Singh Satti	26,835	49.59%	▼3.70
INC	Satpal Raizada	22,089	40.82%	▲6.64
AITC	O. P. Rattan	2,177	4.02%	New
CPI(M)	Gurnam Singh	1,377	2.54%	New
BSP	Kamal Dutt	1,313	2.43%	▼10.11
Margin of victory		4,746	8.77%	▼10.34
Turnout		54,117	75.14%	▲2.42
Registered electors		72,021		▼15.56
BJP hold		Swing	▼3.70	

=== Assembly Election 2007 ===
2007 Himachal Pradesh Legislative Assembly election: Una
Party	Candidate	Votes	%	±%
BJP	Satpal Singh Satti	33,050	53.28%	▲4.79
INC	Virender Gautam	21,198	34.18%	▼14.23
BSP	Dr. Som Datt Bherwal	7,774	12.53%	▲10.75
Margin of victory		11,852	19.11%	▲19.02
Turnout		62,025	72.72%	▼0.49
Registered electors		85,288		▲9.52
BJP hold		Swing		

=== Assembly Election 2003 ===
2003 Himachal Pradesh Legislative Assembly election: Una
Party	Candidate	Votes	%	±%
BJP	Satpal Singh Satti	27,651	48.50%	▲22.33
INC	Virender Gautam	27,600	48.41%	▲10.09
BSP	Hem Raj	1,018	1.79%	▼2.88
Samajwadi Janta Party (Rashtriya)	Khushhal Singh Sabharwal	746	1.31%	New
Margin of victory		51	0.09%	▼12.07
Turnout		57,015	73.22%	▲2.26
Registered electors		77,877		▲16.33
BJP gain from INC		Swing	▲10.18	

=== Assembly Election 1998 ===
1998 Himachal Pradesh Legislative Assembly election: Una
Party	Candidate	Votes	%	±%
INC	Virender Gautam	18,201	38.32%	▲7.29
BJP	Subhash Sahore	12,427	26.16%	▲0.33
HVC	O. P. Rattan	12,283	25.86%	New
BSP	Arjan Singh Dhugga	2,214	4.66%	▼8.68
AIRJP	Telu Ram Atwal	1,553	3.27%	New
JD	Krishan Lal	729	1.53%	▲0.99
Margin of victory		5,774	12.16%	▲10.38
Turnout		47,498	72.36%	▼0.66
Registered electors		66,947		▲6.14
INC hold		Swing	▲7.29	

=== Assembly Election 1993 ===
1993 Himachal Pradesh Legislative Assembly election: Una
Party	Candidate	Votes	%	±%
INC	O. P. Rattan	14,014	31.03%	▼4.18
Independent	Virender Gautam	13,212	29.25%	New
BJP	Vaiya Das Raj	11,669	25.83%	▼28.04
BSP	Chaudhary Gian Chand	6,028	13.35%	▲7.19
JD	Mool Raj	247	0.55%	New
Margin of victory		802	1.78%	▼16.89
Turnout		45,170	72.22%	▲4.72
Registered electors		63,077		▲0.66
INC gain from BJP		Swing	▼22.85	

=== Assembly Election 1990 ===
1990 Himachal Pradesh Legislative Assembly election: Una
Party	Candidate	Votes	%	±%
BJP	Des Raj	22,585	53.88%	▲15.84
INC	Virender Gautam	14,759	35.21%	▼8.09
BSP	Gurbax Singh	2,579	6.15%	New
CPI	Kartar Singh	1,175	2.80%	New
INS(SCS)	Subhash Chand Choudhary	224	0.53%	New
Independent	Ram Pal Sharma	219	0.52%	New
Margin of victory		7,826	18.67%	▲13.40
Turnout		41,919	67.42%	▼1.70
Registered electors		62,665		▲38.26
BJP gain from INC		Swing	▲10.58	

=== Assembly Election 1985 ===
1985 Himachal Pradesh Legislative Assembly election: Una
Party	Candidate	Votes	%	±%
INC	Virender Gautam	13,463	43.30%	▲10.04
BJP	Des Raj	11,826	38.04%	▼13.38
Independent	Gian Chand	4,387	14.11%	New
Independent	Telu Ram	410	1.32%	New
Independent	Kewel Krishan Bhardwaj	397	1.28%	New
Independent	Pawan Kumar Kapila	345	1.11%	New
Margin of victory		1,637	5.27%	▼12.89
Turnout		31,091	69.10%	▲0.63
Registered electors		45,323		▲7.69
INC gain from BJP		Swing	▼8.11	

=== Assembly Election 1982 ===
1982 Himachal Pradesh Legislative Assembly election: Una
Party	Candidate	Votes	%	±%
BJP	Des Raj	14,707	51.42%	New
INC	Ram Rakha	9,515	33.26%	▲12.84
JP	Sarbjot Singh Bedi	3,851	13.46%	▼20.53
Independent	Sham Lal	372	1.30%	New
Independent	Dhani Ram Sultan	159	0.56%	New
Margin of victory		5,192	18.15%	▲6.74
Turnout		28,604	68.95%	▲9.04
Registered electors		42,085		▲5.36
BJP gain from JP		Swing	▲17.42	

=== Assembly Election 1977 ===
1977 Himachal Pradesh Legislative Assembly election: Una
Party	Candidate	Votes	%	±%
JP	Des Raj	8,001	33.99%	New
Independent	Surendar Nath	5,314	22.58%	New
INC	Ram Rakha	4,808	20.43%	▼43.13
Independent	Gian Chand	4,723	20.07%	New
CPI(M)	Ram Asra	555	2.36%	New
Independent	Devinder Kumar`	136	0.58%	New
Margin of victory		2,687	11.42%	▼24.65
Turnout		23,537	59.81%	▲3.55
Registered electors		39,943		▲43.52
JP gain from INC		Swing	▼29.57	

=== Assembly Election 1972 ===
1972 Himachal Pradesh Legislative Assembly election: Una
Party	Candidate	Votes	%	±%
INC	Parkash Chand	9,796	63.56%	▲31.3
Independent	Hazari Lal	4,238	27.50%	New
Independent	Suresh Chander	1,070	6.94%	New
INC(O)	Balraj Kumar	308	2.00%	New
Margin of victory		5,558	36.06%	▲35.74
Turnout		15,412	56.74%	▲2.74
Registered electors		27,831		▼15.40
INC gain from Independent		Swing	▲30.97	

=== Assembly Election 1967 ===
1967 Himachal Pradesh Legislative Assembly election: Una
Party	Candidate	Votes	%	±%
Independent	Parkash Chand	5,643	32.59%	New
INC	S. Chand	5,587	32.26%	New
Independent	L. Dass	2,803	16.19%	New
Independent	M. Singh	2,137	12.34%	New
ABJS	B. Ram	1,147	6.62%	New
Margin of victory		56	0.32%	
Turnout		17,317	56.55%	
Registered electors		32,897		
Independent win (new seat)				

== See also ==
- Una district
- List of constituencies of Himachal Pradesh Legislative Assembly
