= Satpal Singh Satti =

Indian politician

President of Bharatiya Janata Party, Himachal Pradesh
- In office 20 February 2012 – 18 January 2020
- National President: Nitin Gadkari; Rajnath Singh; Amit Shah
- Preceded by: Khimi Ram
- Succeeded by: Rajeev Bindal

Member of the Himachal Pradesh Legislative Assembly
- Incumbent
- Assumed office 8 December 2022
- Preceded by: Satpal Raizada
- Constituency: Una
- In office 6 March 2003 – 18 December 2017
- Preceded by: Virender Gautam
- Succeeded by: Satpal Raizada
- Constituency: Una

Personal details
- Born: 5 January 1964 (age 62) Jalgran, Himachal Pradesh, India
- Party: Bharatiya Janata Party
- Spouse: Meena
- Children: 1 son, 2 daughters
- Parent: Jagdev Singh (father)
- Education: M. A M.Phil (Political Science); Postgraduate diploma in Personnel Management and Labour Welfare

Satpal Singh Satti (born 5 January 1964) is an Indian politician from Himachal Pradesh. He is a member of the Bharatiya Janata Party. He is a four time MLA who won from the Una Assembly constituency consecutively three times for BJP in 2003, 2007 and 2012. Later, he lost in 2017 but regained the seat in the 2022 Assembly election.

== Early life and education ==
Satti had been the longest serving president of Himachal Pradesh state unit of Bharatiya Janta Party. Satpal Satti's legislative constituency is a part of Anurag Thakur parliamentary constituency. He was born in Jalgran, Una.

== Political career ==
Satti's political journey began with active participation in the Akhil Bharatiya Vidyarthi Parishad (ABVP).

He became an MLA for the first time winning the 2003 Himachal Pradesh Legislative Assembly election from Una Assembly seat and retained the seat for the next two terms winning in 2007 and 2012. Later, he lost the 2017 Assembly election to Satpal Raizada of Congress. And in 2022, he won again defeating Satpal Raizada of the Indian National Congress, by a margin of 1,736 votes.

In his role as Chief Parliamentary Secretary, Satti was attached to the Chief Minister for MPP and Power and Youth Services and Sports from 9 July 2009 to March 2012.

After he was elected for the fourth term he was nominated as a Member of the Estimates, Public Administration, and Rules Committees.
