= Ghanari =

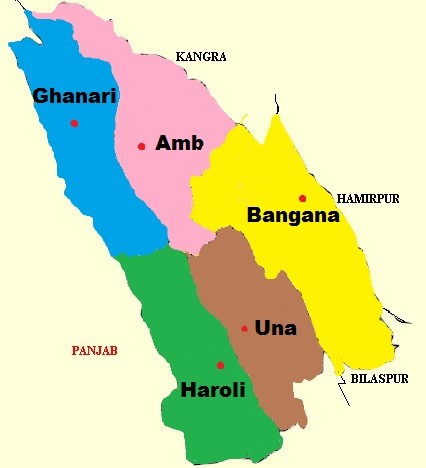
Ghanari

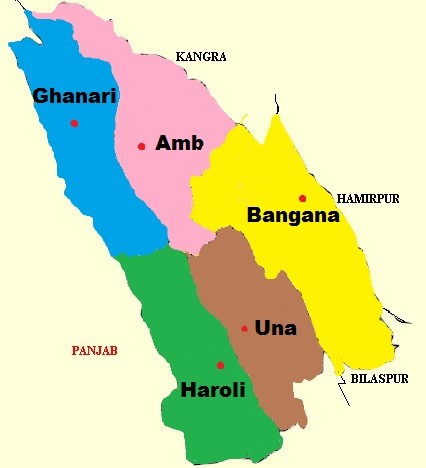
- Interactive map of Ghanari
- Coordinates: 31.720°N 76.025°E
- Country: India
- State: Himachal Pradesh
- District: Una
- Elevation: 470 m (1,540 ft)

Population
  - Total: 5,000

Languages
  - Official: Hindi,Punjabi, Pahari
- Time zone: UTC+5:30 (IST)
- PIN: 177212
- Telephone code: 01976
- Vehicle registration: HP-19AA, HP-19AB, HP-72 (District RTO)
- Nearest city: Hoshiarpur, Talwara, Una, Chintpurni
- Lok Sabha constituency: Hamirpur
- Climate: Hot and humid. (Köppen)
- Avg. summer temperature: 31 °C (88 °F)
- Avg. winter temperature: 10 °C (50 °F)

Ghanari is the headquarter of Tehsil Ghanari in Una district of Himachal Pradesh, India. It comes under Gagret vidhan sabha constituency and shares border with Punjab and lies on the bank of the seasonal Swan River. It is situated in plains of District Una.

Origin of name Ghanari lies in two Sanskrit words Ghan(घन) which means clouds and ari(अरी) which means enemy. It is said that a lot of times in past it used to rain in all surrounding places but not in Ghanari. That's why this place was named Ghanari(Ghan + Ari).

Ghanari is 7 kilometres (4.3 mi) from both Gagret and Daulatpur, 32 kilometres (20 mi) from Hoshiarpur, 28 kilometres (17 mi) from Talwara, and 42 kilometres (26 mi) from district headquarters at Una, Himachal Pradesh.

== People ==
The local language is Kandi dialect of Punjabi while Hindi and English are used for official purpose. The population of Ghanari is around 4600. Most of people of Ghanari belong to the Education Department, explaining Ghanari's fame for its teachers.

Ghanari has given many soldiers and officers to Indian Armed Forces including a winner of sword of honour at Indian Military Academy. Caste like Changha and Brahman are highly in numbers. On the other hand, Ramgarhia and Dadwal are also in medium sized numbers as well as all residents of teshil Ghanari lived in peace and worship all Temples and Gurudwara that are located in Ghanari.

== Climatic conditions ==
In summer, Ghanari's temperature reaches up to 46-47 degrees Celsius and in winters it falls to -2 degrees Celsius.

== Education ==
In 2011, literacy rate of Ghanari was 91.56% compared to 82.80% of Himachal Pradesh. Male literacy stands at 97.00% while female literacy rate was 86.43%.
