= Satpal Raizada =

Indian politician

Satpal Singh Raizada is an Indian politician from the Indian National Congress and a former member of the Himachal Pradesh Legislative Assembly representing the Una assembly constituency of Himachal Pradesh and currently the State Vice President - Himachal Pradesh Congress Congress Committee. He defeated his long time political rival Satpal Singh Satti who was BJP state President and 3 time sitting MLA by 3196 votes, but was defeated by Satpal Singh Satti by 1736 votes in the State Assembly elections in 2022. He was the candidate for Hamirpur Lok Sabha Constituency from Indian National Congress against Anurag Thakur for the 2024 Lok Sabha Elections but lost.
