= Bhanjal =

Bhanjal is an advanced village in the Una District of Himachal Pradesh, India.

According to Census 2011 information the location code or village code of Bhanjal village is 018148. Bhanjal village is located in Amb Tehsil of Una district in Himachal Pradesh, India. It is situated 37 km away from the district headquarter Una. Amb is the sub-district headquarters of Bhanjal village. As per 2009 stats, Bhanjal Upper is the gram panchayat of Bhanjal village.

The total geographical area of the village is 183.68 hectares. Bhanjal has a total population of 1,486 people. There are about 324 houses in Bhanjal village. Gagret is the nearest town to Bhanjal.

The latitude 31.11 and longitude 77.16 are the geocoordinate of the Bhanjal Upper.
