= Jol, Una =

Jol
- Town
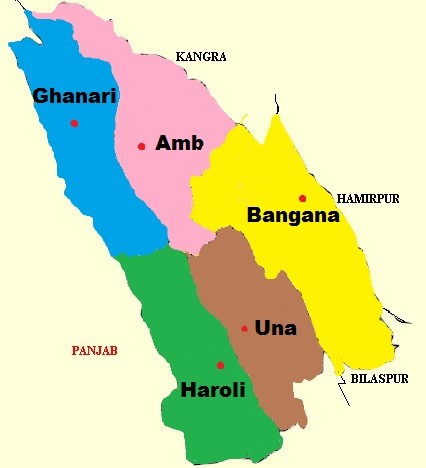
- Interactive map of Jol
- Country: India
- State: Himachal Pradesh
- District: Una

Government
  - Body: Panchayat
- Elevation: 677 m (2,221 ft)

Languages
  - Official: Hindi
- Time zone: UTC+5:30 (IST)
- PIN: 174314
- Telephone code: 01975
- Vehicle registration: HP 78
- Nearest city: Una
- Lok Sabha constituency: Hamirpur
- Civic agency: Panchayat
- Climate: Hot and humid. (Köppen)
- Avg. winter temperature: 2 °C (36 °F)

Jol is a town situated in Bangana block of Una district of Himachal Pradesh.
