= Solah Singhi Dhar =

Sub-Himalayan hills

Solah Singhi Dhar range, the Sub-Himalayan hills commence near Talwara on the Beas River with its highest point reach at Bharwain which is about 2000 feet above sea level in Himachal Pradesh, India. The ranges tread in a general North West-South East direction and the area between these is a longitudinal valley of the Swan river. The altitudes vary from more than 370 metres to over 1200 metres on the Solah Singhi Dhar.

The range runs towards Sutlej (Govind Sagar Lake), its north side submerging gradually into Beas Valley, but on the south it has an abrupt fall of 200 and 300 feet and between the main range and the plains. This area, some 24 km in length and 21 km in width, is thickly forested. At a short distance south to Amb, the Solah Singhi Dhar range recedes eastward ceasing to form the boundary of Una district and the plains at this point form a kind of bay in the hills. From Bangana in Una it enters into Hamirpur district.

The range is home to many species of plants, including medicinal herbs and animals and birds. There is a Solah Singhi Dhar fort in the ranges, a historic tourist spot. It stands on one of the highest points of the west range (3821 feet), is 3896 feet high.
