= Sushma Sharma =

Sushma Sharma may refer to:

- Sushma Sharma (politician)
- Sushma Sharma (kabaddi)
