= Insoo Hyun =

American academic

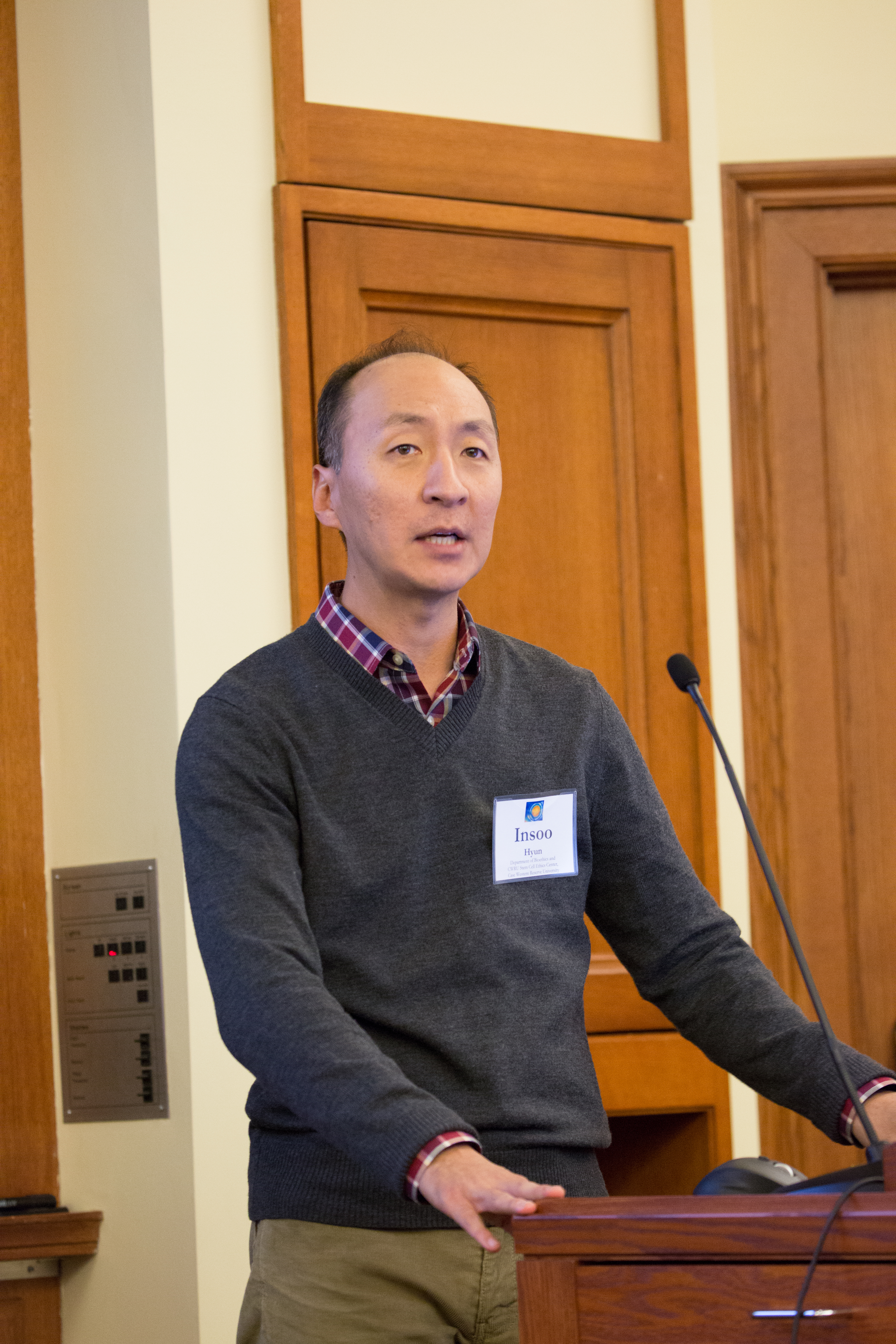
- Hyun in 2016
- Education: Stanford University (BA, MA); Brown University (PhD)
- Occupations: Professor of Bioethics and Philosophy Director of the Center for Life Sciences and Public Learning
- Employer: Harvard Medical School Museum of Science MIT

Korean name
- Hangul: 현인수
- RR: Hyeon Insu
- MR: Hyŏn Insu

Insoo Hyun is the Director of Research Ethics and a faculty member of the Center for Bioethics and senior lecturer on Global Health and Social Medicine at Harvard Medical School. He also serves as the Inaugural Director of the Center for Life Sciences and Public Learning at Boston's Museum of Science. As a Fulbright Scholar and Hastings Center Fellow, Hyun's interests include ethical and policy issues in stem cell research and new biotechnologies.

== Early life and education ==
Insoo Hyun grew up in Hollister, California and graduated from San Benito High School in 1988. Hyun received his B.A. and M.A. in philosophy with honors in ethics in society from Stanford University and his Ph.D. in philosophy from Brown University.

For 21 years, Hyun has been married to Leneigh White, the owner and director of Strongsville Family Counseling. The couple started dating in high school, when he was drum major in the marching band and she was also in the band. He played the saxophone, and she played the flute. “I was two years older than her. I ended up talking with her a lot because I would stand right in front of her during practice.”

== Professional Experience ==
He was awarded a Fulbright Award to study the ethical, legal, and cultural implications of human cloning in South Korea in 2005. A year later, he chaired the Human Biological Materials Procurement subcommittee of the International Society for Stem Cell Research. He was also the chair of ISSCR's Ethics and Public Policy Committee, and co-chair for the organization's Task Force on Guidelines for the Clinical Translation of stem cells. Recently, he served on the Task Force that revised the 2016 ISSCR Guidelines for Stem Cell Research and Clinical Translation.

He has been interviewed frequently on National Public Radio and has served on national commissions for the Institute of Medicine and the National Academy of Sciences in Washington D.C. Hyun is a regular contributor to Nature, Science, Cell Stem Cell, The Hastings Center Report, among many other journals. He was recently named one of Cleveland’s Most Interesting People of 2019

== Publications and Professional Work ==
Currently, Hyun is the Principal Investigator of a BRAIN Initiative-funded project exploring the ethical issues surrounding human brain organoid research, in collaboration with leading scientists at Harvard and Stanford. He is also a Co-Principal Investigator, along with colleagues at the Hastings Center, of an NIH grant identifying ways to improve the oversight of stem cell-based human-animal chimera research.

Hyun was Professor of Bioethics and Philosophy at Case Western Reserve University School of Medicine, where he taught for 18 years.

Hyun has been involved for many years with the ISSCR (International Society for Stem Cell Research), for which he has helped draft all of the ISSCR’s international research guidelines and has served as their Chair of the Ethics and Public Policy Committee.

Hyun has been published often in Nature, Science, The Hastings Center Report, Cell Stem Cell, among many other journals.

Hyun has also authored 2 books on the topic of Stem Cells and Chimera Research Bioethics and the Future of Stem Cell Research and Chimera Research: Methods and Protocols (Methods in Molecular Biology, 2005)

== Museum of Science ==
As of January 4, 2022, Hyun has been appointed as Director of the Center for Life Sciences and Public Learning at Boston's Museum of Science. Hyun will be responsible for spearheading overarching strategy for the Center, building partnerships with government, industry, academia, and the public. He works with other Museum teams to develop inclusive discussions, events, exhibits, curricula, citizen science projects and digital programming around key life sciences issues – from vaccinations to genetic engineering to broadening talent pipelines into the field.

== Martial Arts ==
Hyun holds three black belts, and in 2017, he received his black band, the equivalent of a black belt, in muay thai.

About four times a week, you can find the professor training in mixed martial arts at Vanyo Martial Arts in Strongsville. Hyun practices Thai kickboxing and Brazilian jiujitsu, and he was California State Champion in Kenpo Karate Fighting when he attended Stanford University. Hyun approaches his work in a similar way to how he approaches mixed martial arts. “I’ll learn from many different approaches. I’ll keep what works, throw away whatever doesn’t work.”
