= Mary Kim Joh =

Korean composer and physician (1904–2005)

Mary Kim Joh

Mary C. Kim Joh (1904 – February 9, 2005), also known as Che Sik Cho (Korean: 조채식), was a Korean-American music composer, academic and medical research scientist. Joh is best known for writing "School Bell" (학교종 Hak'kyo Jong) in 1945. This children's song is taught to pre-school students in South Korea.

== Early life ==
Joh, née Kim Sam-sik (김삼식), was born in Seoul in 1904. She was the daughter of Kim Ik-seung, the founder of one of Korea's first joint-stock companies, and a niece of Kim Kyu-sik. She graduated from Ewha Womans University. In 1930, she was awarded a master's degree in music at the University of Michigan. Later in life, she earned a master's degree in science from Wayne State University.

== Career ==
Joh taught in the music department at Ewha. She was asked by the South Korean government to compose children's songs after the end of Japanese rule over the country. At the end of World War II, the Koreans had no Korean-language school materials. Her 1950 book on Korean folk songs is one of very few published on the subject.

In the United States, Joh changed professions. She began a second career working in a hospital laboratory.

At age 73, she was a Peace Corps volunteer in Liberia. She worked in a hospital 600 miles from Monrovia.

== Selected works ==
In an overview of Joh's writing, OCLC/WorldCat lists 2 works in 3 publications in 2 languages and 39 library holdings.

This list is not finished; you can help Wikipedia by adding to it.

- Folk songs of Korea: original folk melodies and national anthem, 1950

== Honors ==
- Ewha University, honoris causa 1980

== See also ==
- Children's music
