= Amb, India =

Amb
- Town
- Location in Himachal Pradesh, India Amb (India)
- Coordinates: 31°40′47″N 76°07′03″E
- Country: India
- State: Himachal Pradesh
- District: Una

Government
  - Body: Panchayat
- Elevation: 478 m (1,568 ft)

Population
  - Total: 269,000

Languages
  - Official: Hindi
- Time zone: UTC+5:30 (IST)
- PIN: 177203
- Telephone code: 01976
- Vehicle registration: HP-19
- Nearest city: Una, Hamirpur, Hoshiarpur, Chintpurni
- Lok Sabha constituency: Hamirpur
- Civic agency: Panchayat
- Climate: Hot and humid. (Köppen)
- Avg. summer temperature: 28 °C (82 °F)
- Avg. winter temperature: 14 °C (57 °F)

Amb is a town in the Una district in Himachal Pradesh state, India. It is a sub-division and tehsil of Una district.

Vande Bharat Express connects New Delhi to this town via Amb Andaura Vande Bharat Express.

Himachal has 5 shakti peeths. Chintpurni Temple is located in Chintpurni village, about 20 kms north of Amb town.

== Geography and Demographics ==
Amb is in the Soan valley surrounded by the Shivalik mountains.

== Language ==
The local language is Pahari. Hindi and English are used for official purposes.

== History ==
In the year 1877, at the request of Maharaja Ranbir Singh of Jammu and Kashmir, the British government restored to Raja Ran Singh the Jagir in Jaswan, originally held by Raja Ummed Singh consisting of 21 villages in Jaswan Dun valley and the family garden at Amb, as well as palace buildings of Raja Ummed Singh at Rajpura. Raja Ran Singh died in 1892 and was succeeded by his son Raja Raghunath Singh who died in 1918. Thereafter, Raja Laxman Singh succeeded him and was in turn succeeded by his son Raja Chain Singh. After his death in 2009, Raja Nagendra singh succeeded him.

== Tourism & culture ==
Chintpurni Temple: A revered shakti peeth. This is one of the most famous temples in the Una district of Himachal Pradesh. It is situated on the Dharamshala-Hoshiarpur road. It is visited by thousands of devotees, mostly from Himachal Pradesh and Punjab. Chintpurni temple is devoted to the Supreme Goddess Durga.

Pong Dam: A dam and wildlife sanctuary, a major attraction amongst tourists.
