= Una, Himachal Pradesh =

Una
- City
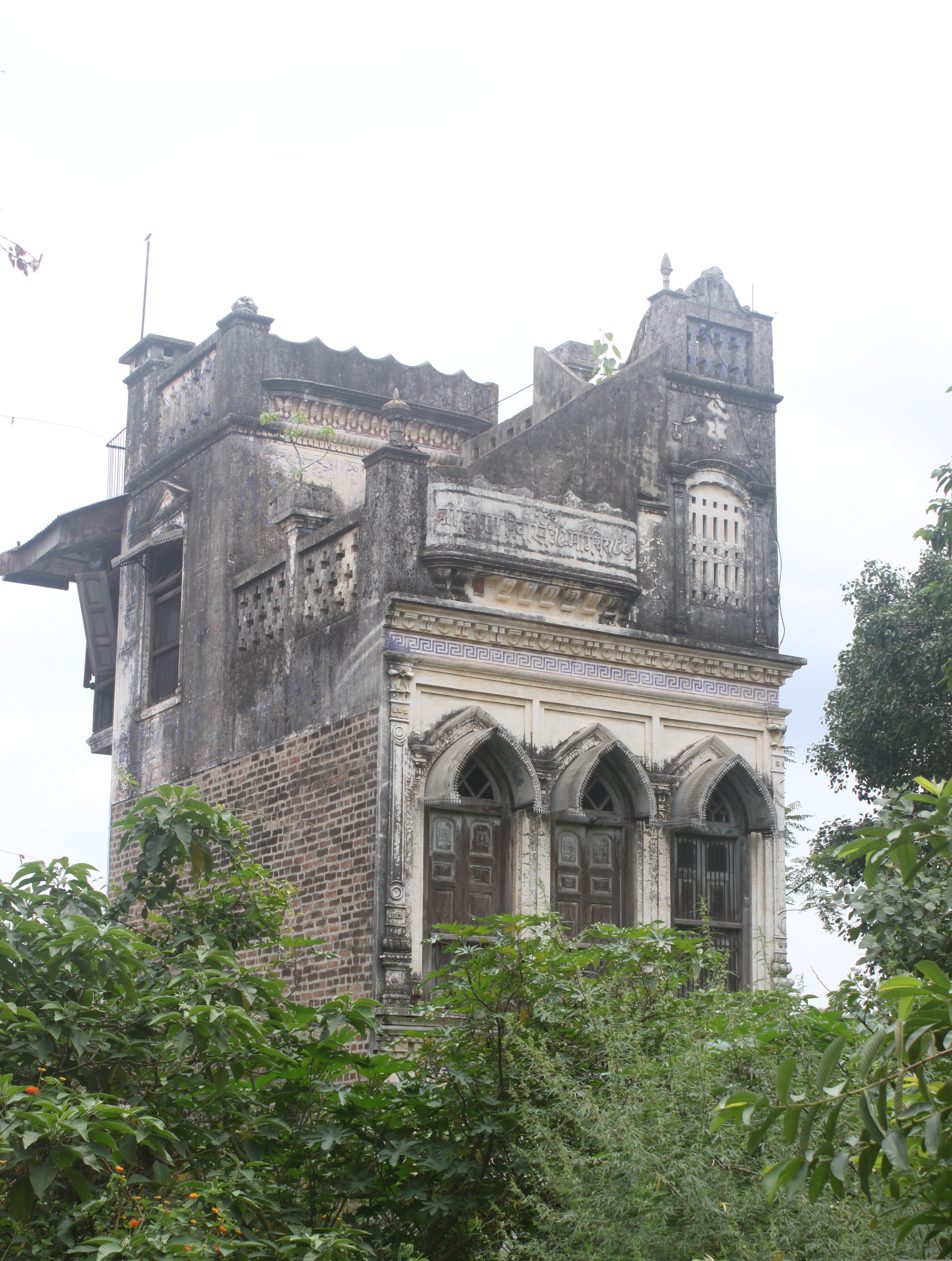
- Picturesque building in Haroli, Una

- Location in Himachal Pradesh, India
- Coordinates: 31.468°N 76.271°E
- Country: India
- State: Himachal Pradesh
- District: Una
- Established: 1 September 1972
- Elevation: 369 m (1,211 ft)

Population (2011)
  - Total: 18,722
  - Rank: 10 in HP

Languages
  - Official: Hindi
  - Other spoken: Punjabi, Pahari
- Time zone: UTC+5:30 (IST)
- Postal code: 174303
- Vehicle registration: HP-19, HP-19AA, HP-20, HP-72 HP-78, HP-80
- Website: hpuna.nic.in

Una is a city with Municipal Council and district headquarter in Una district, in the Indian state of Himachal Pradesh. Una sits on the border with Punjab, Una is one of the gateways to Himachal Pradesh. It lies on the bank of River Swan, a tributary of Sutlej.

The city's terrain is a mix of both hilly and plain areas. In fact, the low hilly terrain gradually flattens to merge with the plains, giving Una a tropical climate which gets quite hot in summer months.

Himachal has 5 Shakti PeethsChintpurni Temple is one of them located in Chintpurni village, about 45 km north of the city.

Chintpurni Temple, Kila Baba Bedi ji and Pong Dam are major tourist attractions of this area.

Palampur is served by the Una Himachal railway station (UNA), NH 503 and NH 503A connects Palampur, nearest airports are Chandigarh Airport and Kangra Airport (IATA: DHM, ICAO: VIGG).

== History ==
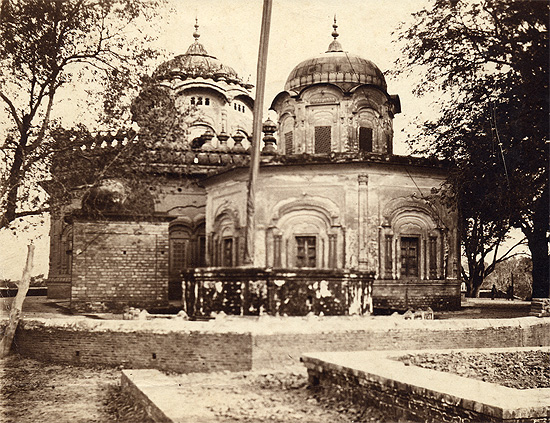
Photograph of Damdama Sahib Singh Bedi, the mausoleum of Sahib Singh Bedi in Una, ca.1910

The ancient Una Fort (Kila), which is a historical fort and an ancestral home of the descendants of the first guru of the Sikhs, Guru Nanak. Many Bedi descendants of Lakhmi Das, the younger son of Guru Nanak, reside at Una.

== Geography and climate ==
Una is located at 31.48°N 76.28°E. It has an average elevation of 369 metres (1,210 feet). The elevation keeps temperatures cooler than surrounding lowlands, however, the area still experiences temperatures up to 45 °C (113 °F).

Climate data for Una (1991–2020, extremes 1985–2020)
Month	Jan	Feb	Mar	Apr	May	Jun	Jul	Aug	Sep	Oct	Nov	Dec	Year
Record high °C (°F)	31.0 (87.8)	34.2 (93.6)	39.4 (102.9)	43.2 (109.8)	45.2 (113.4)	45.2 (113.4)	42.2 (108.0)	39.0 (102.2)	38.6 (101.5)	36.6 (97.9)	33.4 (92.1)	30.6 (87.1)	45.2 (113.4)
Mean daily maximum °C (°F)	19.7 (67.5)	23.1 (73.6)	28.5 (83.3)	34.3 (93.7)	38.4 (101.1)	37.7 (99.9)	33.9 (93.0)	32.9 (91.2)	32.8 (91.0)	31.5 (88.7)	27.5 (81.5)	22.7 (72.9)	30.2 (86.4)
Mean daily minimum °C (°F)	3.1 (37.6)	5.8 (42.4)	9.5 (49.1)	13.4 (56.1)	18.3 (64.9)	21.1 (70.0)	21.8 (71.2)	21.6 (70.9)	19.8 (67.6)	13.7 (56.7)	8.0 (46.4)	3.5 (38.3)	13.3 (55.9)
Record low °C (°F)	−5.8 (21.6)	−1.6 (29.1)	3.0 (37.4)	6.7 (44.1)	8.6 (47.5)	14.7 (58.5)	17.0 (62.6)	16.3 (61.3)	12.3 (54.1)	5.1 (41.2)	1.8 (35.2)	−3.3 (26.1)	−5.8 (21.6)
Average rainfall mm (inches)	42.3 (1.67)	48.3 (1.90)	38.5 (1.52)	24.8 (0.98)	29.7 (1.17)	109.1 (4.30)	316.1 (12.44)	338.0 (13.31)	136.3 (5.37)	22.8 (0.90)	7.3 (0.29)	19.8 (0.78)	1,132.8 (44.60)
Average rainy days	2.7	3.5	3.0	1.9	2.3	6.5	11.7	11.8	5.8	1.4	0.6	1.0	52.3
Average relative humidity (%) (at 17:30 IST)	64	62	53	42	38	49	66	71	65	60	56	59	57
Source: India Meteorological Department

== Demographics ==
Religions in Una City (2011)
Religion	Percent
Hindus	91.38%
Sikhs	6.93%
Muslims	1.05%
Distribution of religions

According to the 2011 Census of India, Una town had a population of 18,722 with 9,851 males and 8,871 females. The literacy rate was 86.21%, higher than the state average of 82.80%. The male literacy and female literacy rates were 88.84 and 83.29% respectively. There were 1,954 children below the age of six years. The sex ratio and child sex ratio of the town stood at 901 and 918 respectively. Punjabi and Pahari are the main spoken languages.

== Transport ==
Una serves as a major gateway to south-western Himachal Pradesh, with strategic road and rail connectivity and inland routes to Shimla, Manali, Dharamshala, Chamba, and beyond via National Highway 503 and National Highway 503A. to several important towns in Himachal and Punjab.

Road

Una is well connected to Shimla, Delhi, Chandigarh, Amritsar, Dharamshala, Manali, Chamba, etc via Himachal Road Transport Corporation (HRTC) services.

Rail

Una Himachal Railway Station (station code: UHL) is the only broad-gauge terminus in the region.

Air

- Gaggal (Kangra) Domestic Airport (114 km)
- Chandigarh International Airport (127 km)
