= Haroli Tehsil =

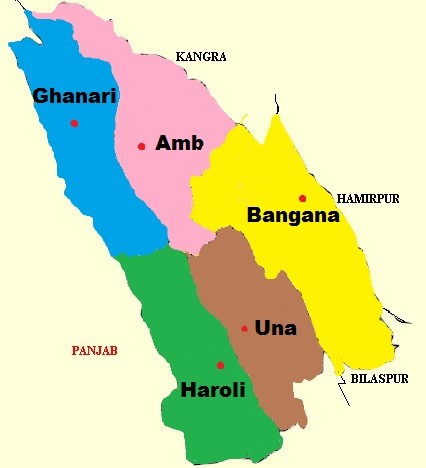
Haroli
- Town
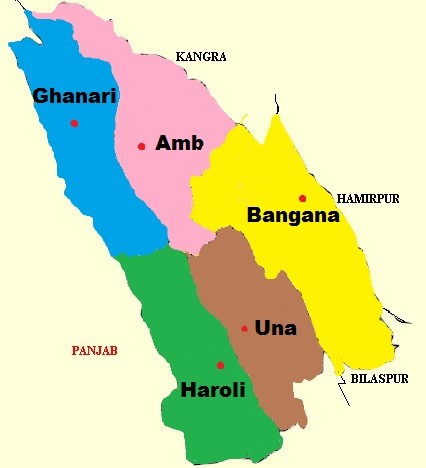
- Interactive map of Haroli
- Country: India
- State: Himachal Pradesh
- District: Una

Languages
  - Official: Hindi
- Time zone: UTC+5:30 (IST)
- PIN: 177220
- Climate: Hot and humid. (Köppen)
- Avg. summer temperature: 45 °C (113 °F)
- Avg. winter temperature: 3 °C (37 °F)

Haroli is one of the five major tehsils in Una, Himachal Pradesh. It is an Assembly constituency with a city headquarter located 6 km south from the District headquarters of Una.

Villages near Haroli include Dharampur (3 km), Palkwah (3 km), Kangar (3 km), Rora (3 km), and Lower Badehra (4 km). Haroli is further surrounded by Una City towards the east, Mahilpur City towards the west, Garhshankar City towards the south, and Bangana City towards the north. Nangal, Hoshiarpur, Nawanshahr, Hamirpur are cities near Haroli. This place is on the border of the Una District and Hoshiarpur District. Hoshiarpur District, Garhshankar is located towards the south of Haroli. It is near to the Punjab State Border.

== Historical Figures ==
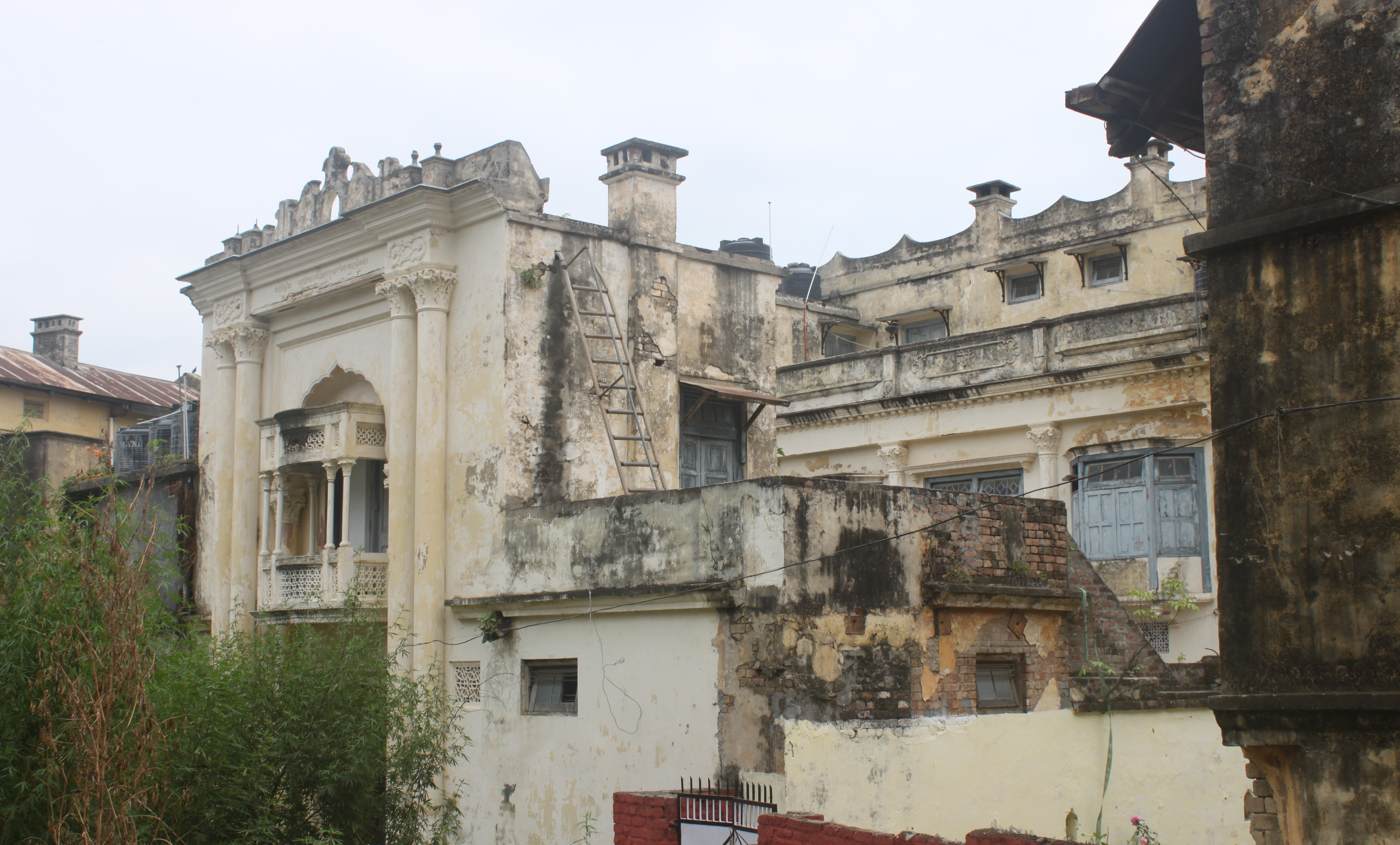
Another old historical building in Haroli

Haroli was initially known as Rai Sahib Puran Mal Kuthiala Nagar. Rai Sahib was the biggest entrepreneur of Haroli and Shimla and his business has expanded to present-day Lahore. His Haveli (residence) is at the hill top of Haroli, by going up the way from Rai Bahadur Jodhamal Marg. His Haveli was the oldest and the initial Haveli there because his father with his 2 elder brothers were the first to settle in Haroli. Rai Sahib Puran Mal Kuthiala had done a lot of social services for the people of Haroli by starting with the basic, which is by giving them good food and getting wells dug up so as to give them clean drinking water. He was born in the year 1836 and had created a massive empire till the early 20th century. He was the leading Banker as well as the biggest landlord in Haroli and Shimla.He was the Modi (financer) to the princely states like Keonthal, Bhagat, Jubal, Malerkotla, Koti Riyasat, Maharaja Jammu, Maharaja Patiala, Mandi Riyasat etc. He was always accompanied by his son named Raizada Lala Kadoomal Kuthiala who from the very beginning helped his father like an obedient son and expanded the business even further and made the business firms feet more strong. He was the owner of many Haveli's and other properties in Haroli as well as lands in nearby villages where they used to grow food like pulses, vegetables, fruits, spices on a large scale and hence forth distribute it to the poor and sell it to the Rich. He had created Haroli Waterworks Trust, for which he donated his land and large sum of money, so that water from pipeline could be sent to everyones' houses in Haroli, which in the 1920s no one in a village could have thought off. He even donated land, on the request of DC of Shimla for creating the old bus stand at Shimla. Rai Sahib Puran Mal Kuthiala died in the year 1932 in Shimla, where an official holiday was declared by the DC of Shimla on the demise of a great personality. He lived a life full of wealth and prosperity to serve the people and society by being selfless. He donated many lands owned by him in Kangra and Una to his sareeks (relatives) so that they could also prosper and donated a lot of land to people in need. People remember him as a great philanthropist of his time.

Another personality of Haroli was Rai Bahadur Jodhamal. Rai Bahadur Jodhamal was born on 23 November 1881 in Haroli Village of Princely Estate called Kuthiala. He donated 650 Kanal land situated in Tanda, District Kangra to the government for the purpose of constructing a TB Sanatorium.

There still are plenty of estates in Haroli, which were historically owned by Jodhamal ji.

Rai Bahadur Jodhamal died on 9 October 1961.

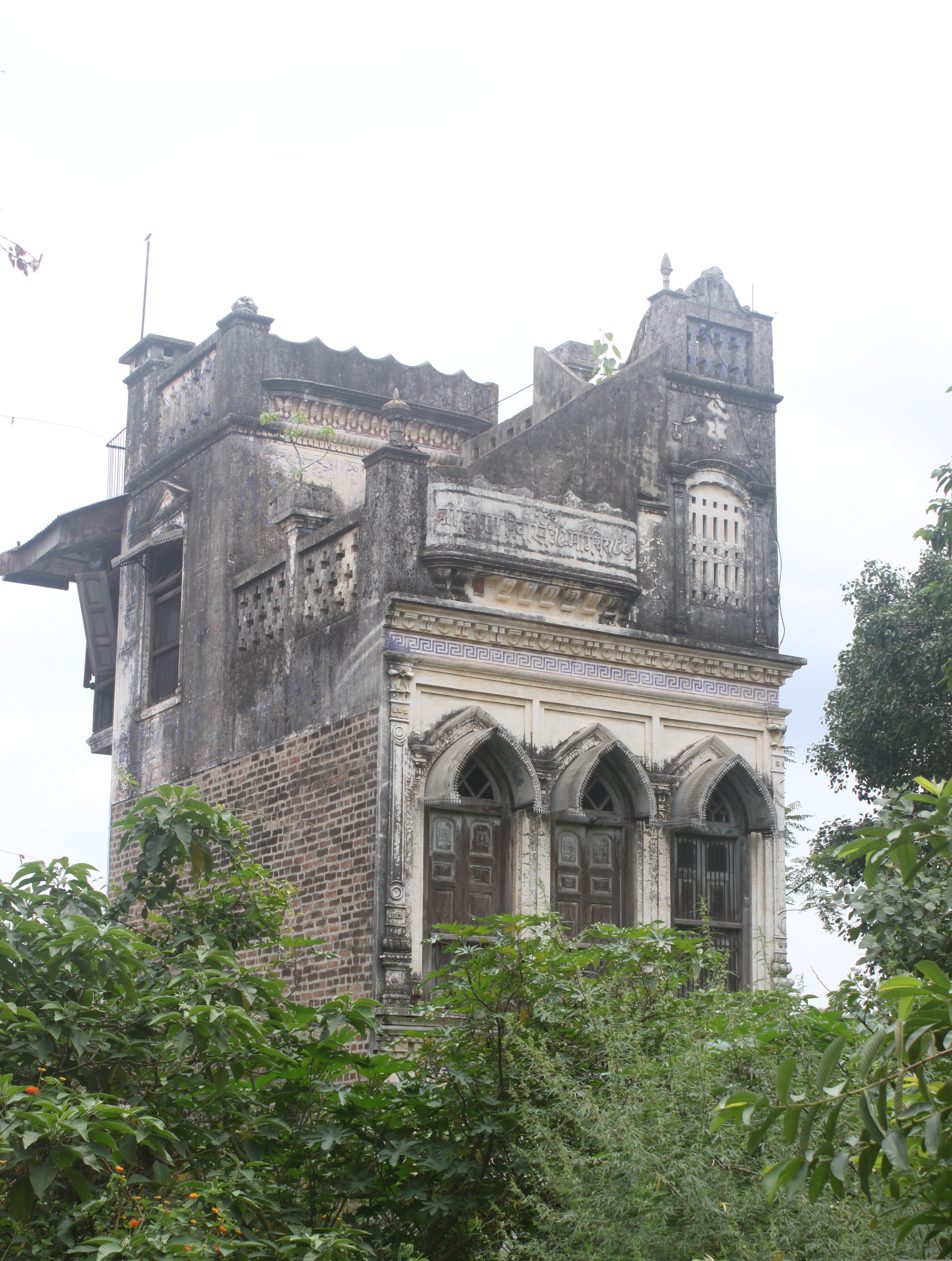
An old building from Sh. Jodhamal estate

== Haroli Constituency ==
INC and BJP are the major political parties in this area. The current MLA is Mukesh Agnihotri from Indian National Congress.

== See also ==
- Ghanari
