= Joh Hyun =

South Korean novelist

Joh Hyun (The romanization preferred by the author according to LTI Korea.) (Hangul 조현; born 1969) is a South Korean novelist. He follows the example of some artists known to adopt alien alter-egos (notably the British musician David Bowie, who invented the bisexual rockstar Ziggy Stardust persona) and describes himself as a "special correspondent in Earth for the planet of Klaatu." Klaatu is also the name of a fictional alien in the 1951 film The Day the Earth Stood Still directed by Robert Wise, based on the short story "Farewell to the Master" by Harry Bates. A Canadian rock band performed under the same name in the 1970s. As his unusual self-label suggests, Joh Hyun writes science fiction that combines Eastern history and culture with those of the West.

== Life ==
Joh Hyun was born in Damyang County, South Korea in 1969. He made his literary debut in 2008 when his short story “The Elegant Philosophy of the Paper Napkin” (종이냅킨에 대한 우아한 철학) won the Dong-A Daily New Writer's Contest. Jo mainly wrote poetry during his university years, but after landing a full-time job, he became content with reading literature as opposed to writing it. Near the end of his twenties, he decided to submit a poem to a new writer's contest but did not win. He tried again a decade later as a way to wrap up his thirties, sending in a poem along with a shorty story he happened to have ready at the time. To his surprise, the short story won the contest. He famously donated half of his prize money to a little girl in Mozambique so he could put into action the central message of his winning story: "All forms of life are interconnected, cannot exist independently, and must share with one another."

An avid reader, Jo dreamed of becoming a librarian as a child. When he started university, he haunted the school library and frequented used bookstores because he could not afford to buy new books. Jo was more interested in poetry and cinema than in novels during his university years. Wishing to learn more about screenwriting and film, he joined the Korea Media Rating Board after graduating. In 2003, he began working as a staff member of the Performing Arts department at the Kookmin University College of Art. In his first year, he was awarded the Best Reader Award by the Dean of Libraries of Kookmin University Sungkok Library.

Jo considers his dreams to be a major source of creative inspiration. In fact, most of the works in his first short story collection Nuguegena amugeotdo anin hambeogeoui yeoksa (누구에게나 아무것도 아닌 햄버거의 역사 The History of the Hamburger that Was Nothing to Anyone), including his award-winning debut “The Elegant Philosophy of the Paper Napkin” (종이냅킨에 대한 우아한 철학), were written based on what he saw in his dreams. Jo elaborates on his dreams in another short story, “Eunhasureul geonneo – klaatuhangseongtongshin 1” (은하수를 건너-클라투행성통신1 Crossing the Galaxy: Correspondence to Planet Klaatu 1). The protagonist's lucid dreams can be seen as alternate versions of Jo's own dream world. “The Elegant Philosophy of the Paper Napkin” has been translated into English and appeared in the literary journal AZALEA published by the Korean Institute of Harvard University.

== Writing ==
Literary critic Jeong Gwa-ri and novelist Song Sokze, who judged the 2008 Dong-A Daily New Writer's Contest, wrote the following commentary on selecting Joh Hyun's “The Elegant Philosophy of the Paper Napkin” as the winning work:

“‘The Elegant Philosophy of the Paper Napkin’ follows the story of cyborgs conducting an anthropological study of humans after their extinction. The work stood out for its highly imaginative premise involving ‘The Waste Land’ poet T. S. Eliot and napkins that satirize the emotional poverty of people today. Also notable was its clever narrative structure of starting and ending the story with shocking reveals in the form of letters. Blending prescient reflections on reality into a fictional world, while meeting the classic criteria for a ‘well-wrought urn,’ the work was a worthy winner.”

The commentary offers a basic guideline to understanding Joh Hyun’s work: against the backdrop of fictional universes influenced by a number of science fiction masterpieces, Jo writes stories about reality. In a perceptive commentary on the author, literary critic Kang Yu-jeong writes: “Novels are fiction. Even a fact, as soon as it enters the framework of fiction, becomes a component of fiction. A story that shamelessly presents ‘facts’ as real information is phony and obscene. Bad storytellers often use real information to emphasize the authenticity of their work. Bad liars think they are fooling others, but are really just fooling themselves. Better liars know how to fool others without fooling themselves. The best liars, that is the true liars, believe in their own lies. To make a lie true, the key is to properly construct the lie and have faith in it. Funnily enough, a properly constructed lie is often more poignant than a poorly told truth. People readily sympathize with true lies and are moved by their alluring charm. A well-made story, a great novel—they are all poignant lies. In the world of fiction and storytelling, whether something is factual or not is not the point. The point is whether it can inspire awe in your heart. I have no doubt in my mind that Joh Hyun is a superb liar.”

== Works ==
1. 『누구에게나 아무것도 아닌 햄버거의 역사』, 민음사, 2011년. ISBN 9788937483844 { The History of the Hamburger that Was Nothing to Anyone. Minumsa, 2011. }

2. 「제인도우, 마이보스」, 『2017 현대문학상 수상소설집』, 현대문학, 2017년. ISBN 9788972758013 { “Jane Doe, My Boss.” In 2017 Hyundae Literary Award Anthology. Hyundae Munhak, 2017. }

=== Works in translation ===
- The Elegant Philosophy of the Paper Napkin (English)

== Awards ==
1. 2017: Hyundae Literary Award

2. 2008: Dong-A Daily New Writer's Contest
