= Chintpurni =

Town and pilgrimage center in Himachal Pradesh, India

Maa Chintpurni
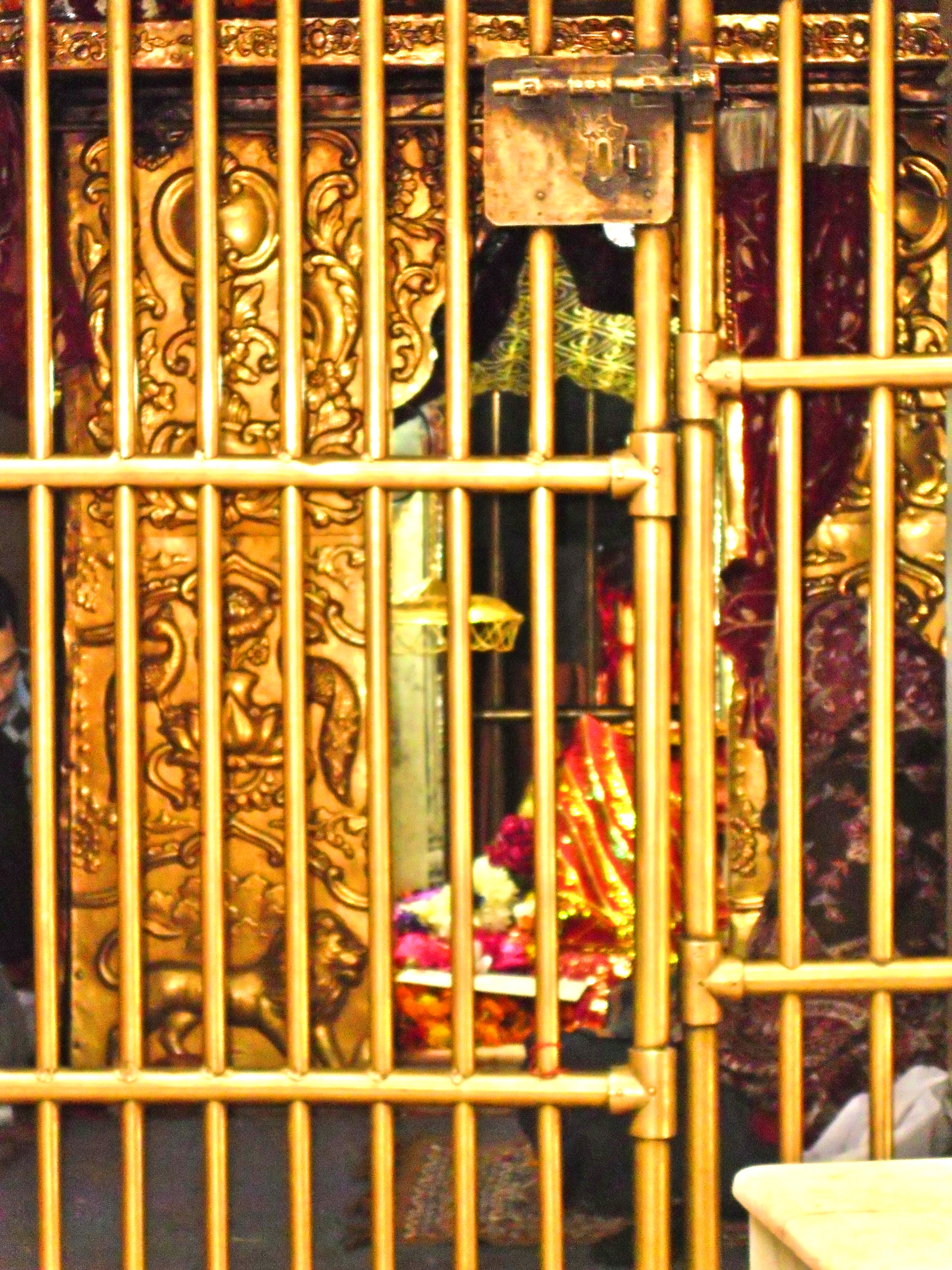
- Mata Chintpurni inside from back gate

- Location in Himachal Pradesh

Religion
- Affiliation: Hinduism
- District: Una district
- Deity: Chhinnamasta
- Festival: Navratri

Location
- Location: Chintpurni, 177110
- State: Himachal Pradesh
- Country: India
- Coordinates: 31.808620°N 76.102870°E

Architecture
- Type: Hindu
- Creator: Mai Das
- Completed: unknown
- Elevation: 977.87 m (3,208 ft)

Website
- http://chintpurni.in

Chintpurni is a small town in the Una district of Himachal Pradesh about 40 km (25 miles) north of Una, not far from the border with the Indian state of Punjab. The elevation is about 977 meters (about 3,200 feet). It is home to the Maa Chintpurni Temple which is a major pilgrimage site as one of the Shakta pithas in India.

== Chintpurni temple as a Shakta pitha ==
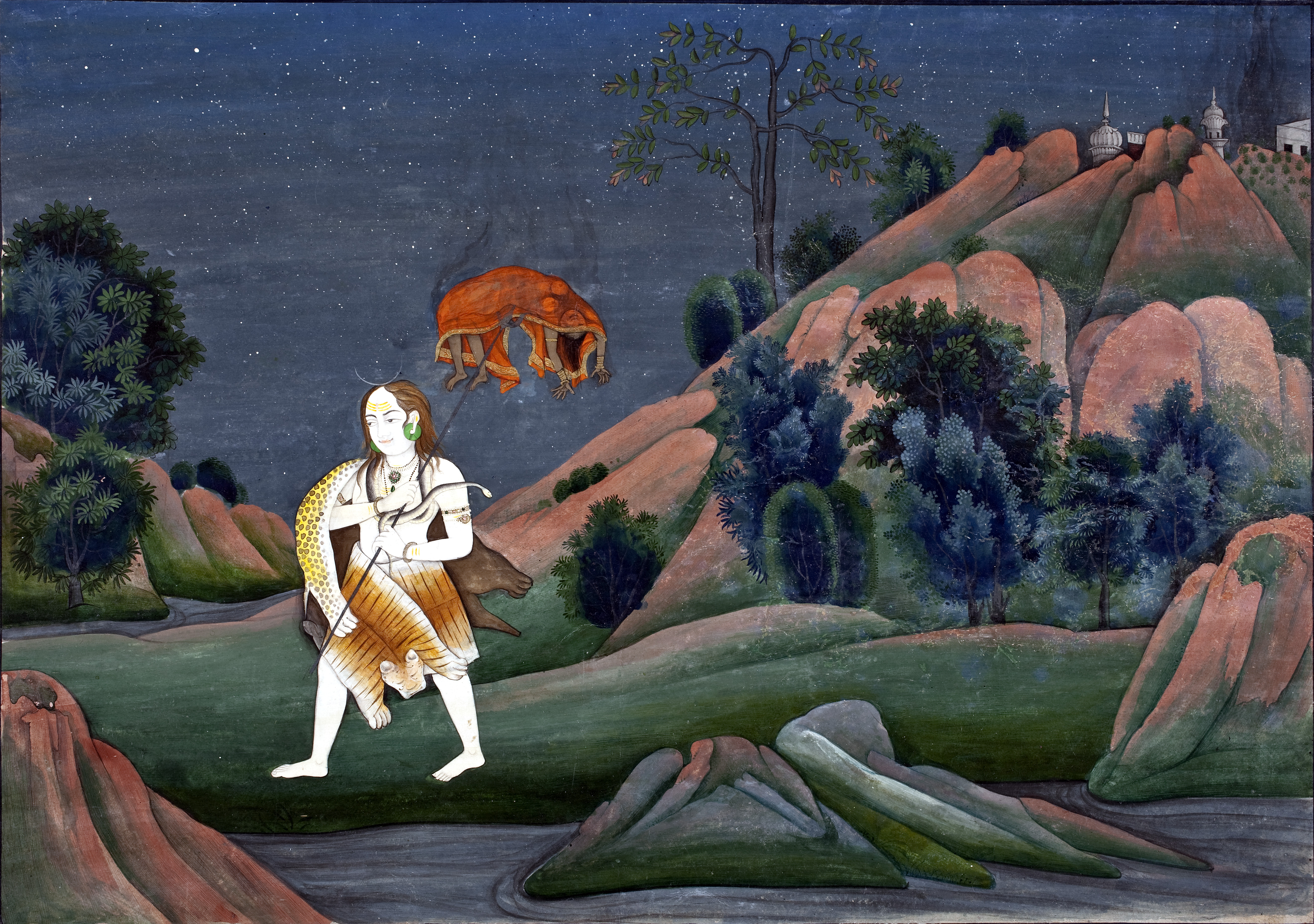
Shiva carrying the corpse of Sati Devi

The Chinnamastika Devi is a divine embodiment of self-sacrifice and there by the Chintpurni shri is considered as a Shakta pitha. The story of Daksha yaga and Sati's self immolation is the story liked to the Shakta pithas. Shakta pithas are holy shrines of Shakti associated with a story that says about the falling of body parts of the corpse of Sati Devi, when Lord Shiva carried it and wandered in sorrow. There are 51 Shakta pithas associated with the 51 alphabets in Sanskrit. It is believed that Sati Devi's consciousness fell here.

== Weather ==
In general, temperature in Chintpurni is about 5 degrees lower than in the Punjab and Haryana plains and in Delhi. The average annual rainfall is 2587 mm. In 2012, it had a chilling winter as there was a snowfall, reported after a period of 52 years, leading to road jams.

Climate data for Chintpurni
Month	Jan	Feb	Mar	Apr	May	Jun	Jul	Aug	Sep	Oct	Nov	Dec	Year
Mean daily maximum °C (°F)	16 (61)	21 (70)	24 (75)	29 (84)	35 (95)	35 (95)	32 (90)	30 (86)	31 (88)	27 (81)	22 (72)	16 (61)	27 (80)
Mean daily minimum °C (°F)	3 (37)	7 (45)	14 (57)	16 (61)	23 (73)	23 (73)	22 (72)	21 (70)	21 (70)	14 (57)	9 (48)	4 (39)	15 (59)
Source: World Meteorological Organisation

== Gallery ==
chinna masta temple
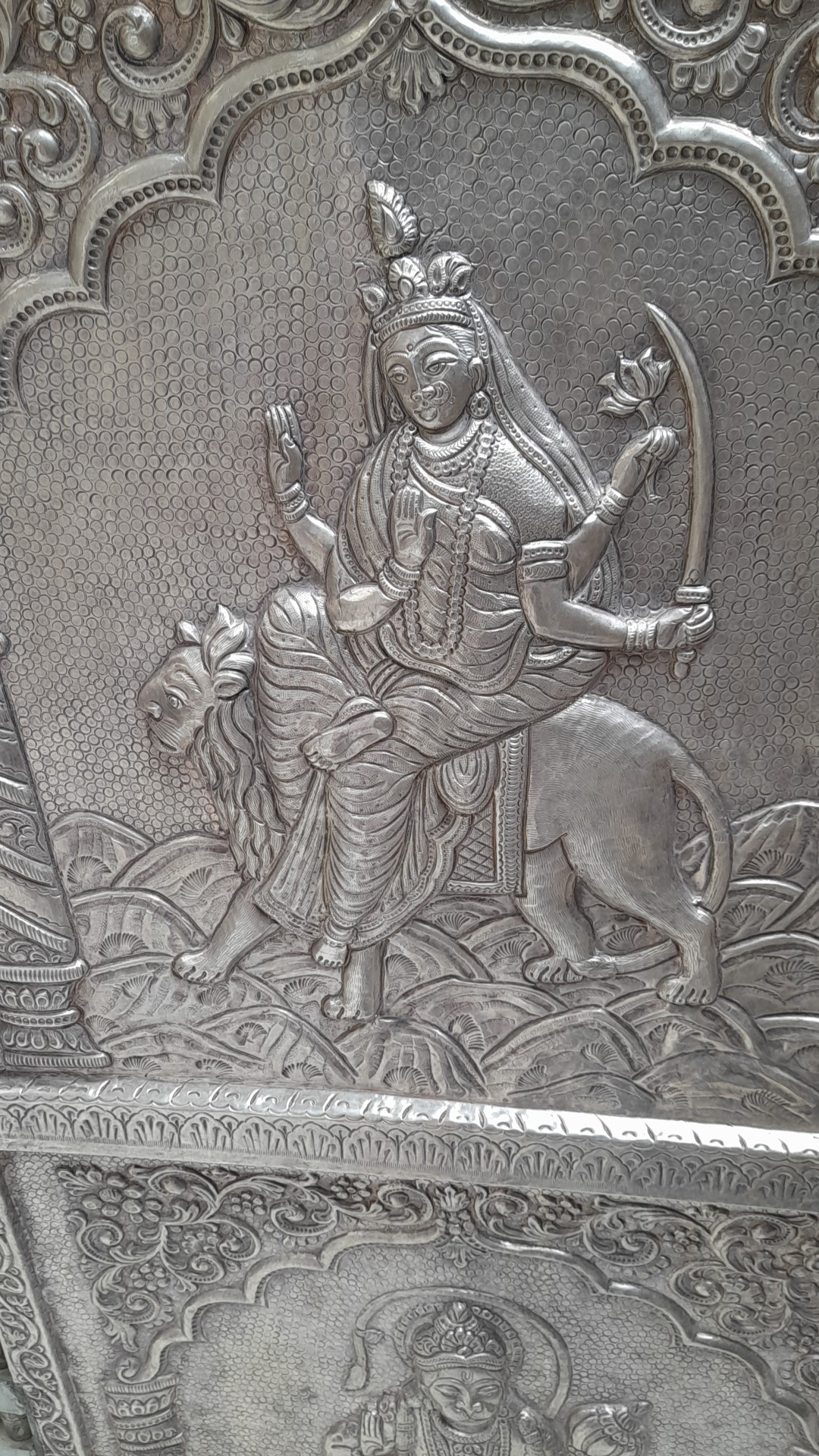
durga in the door

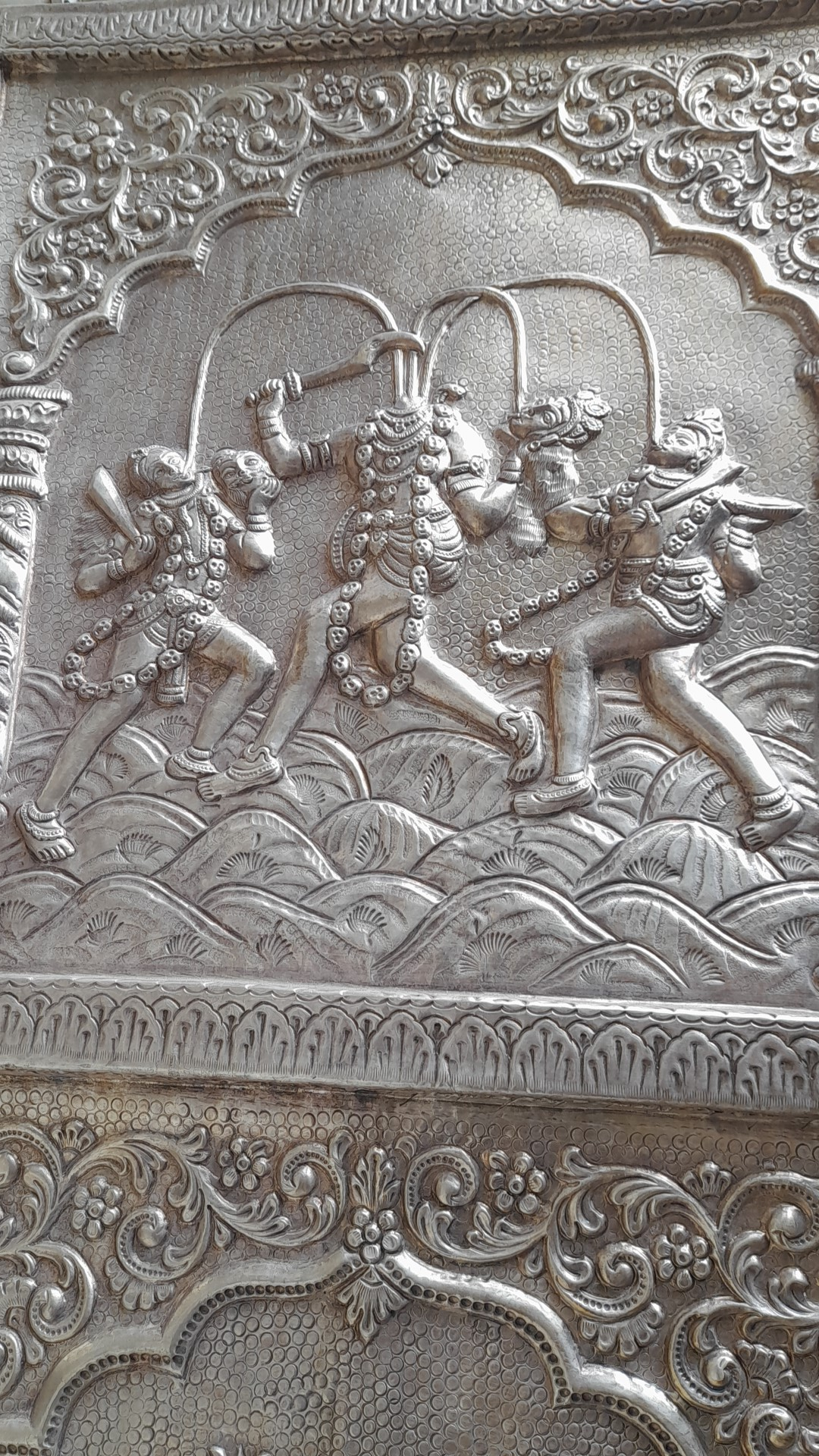
chinnamasta in the door

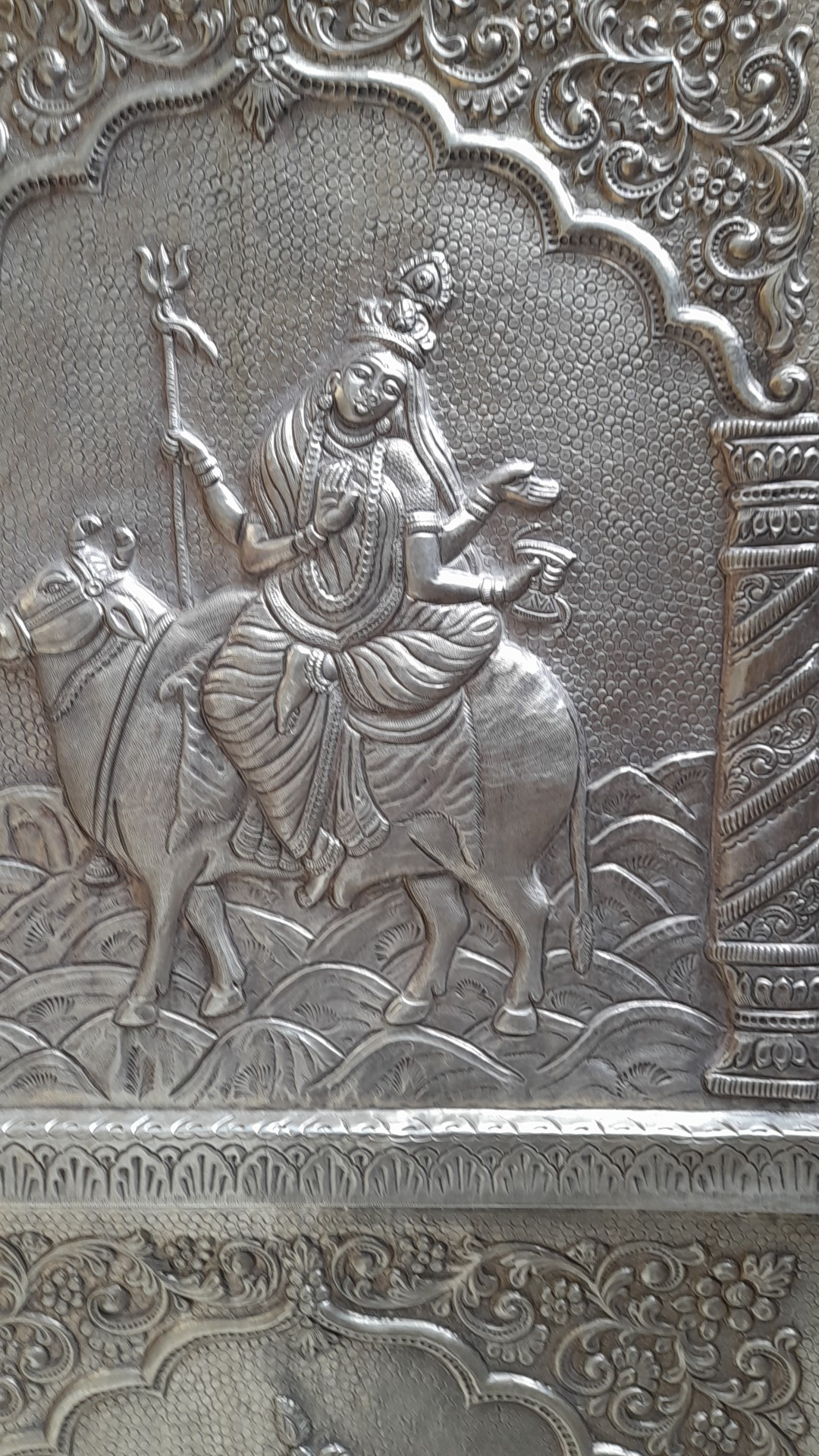
parvati

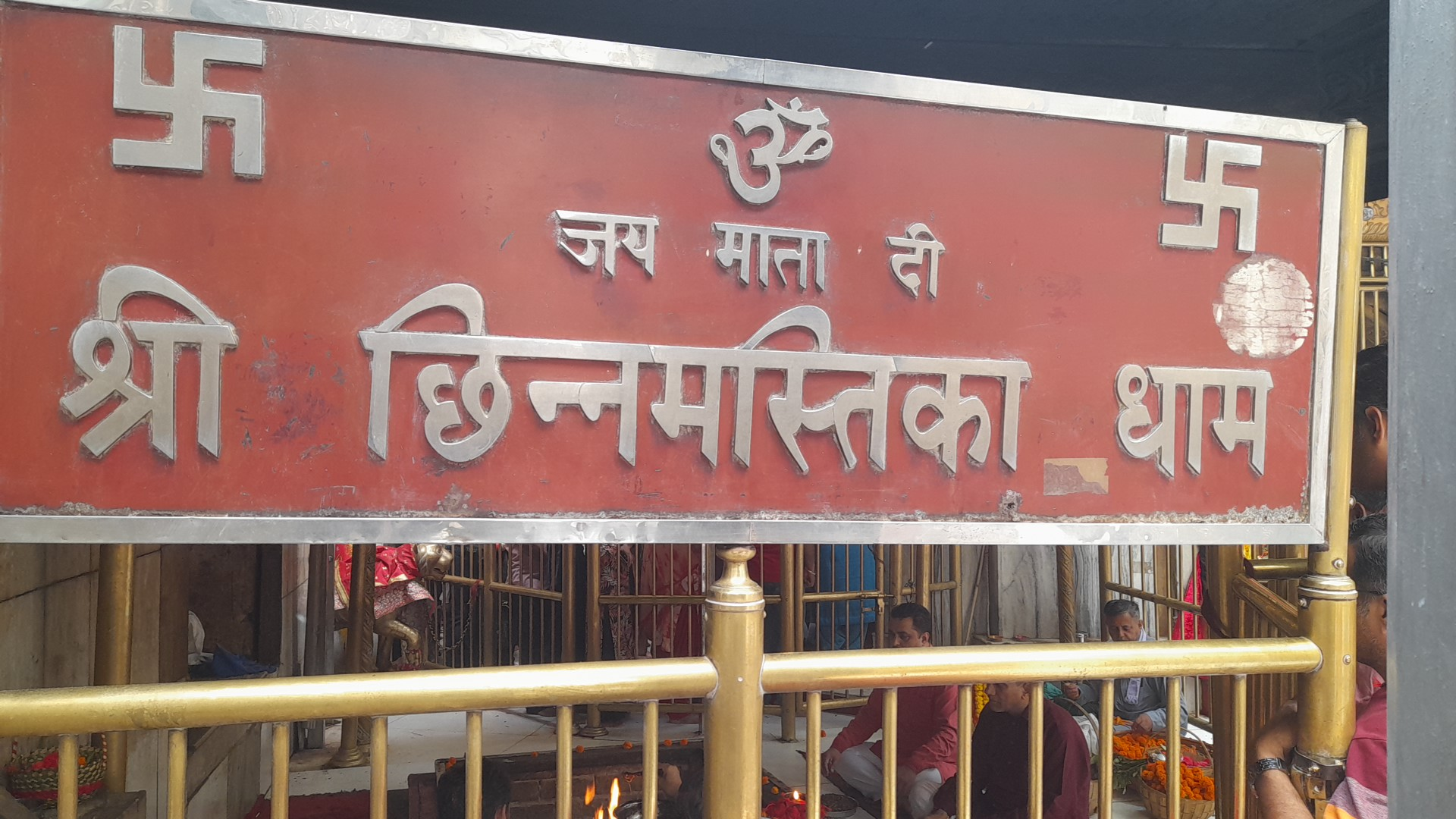
chinna masta dham

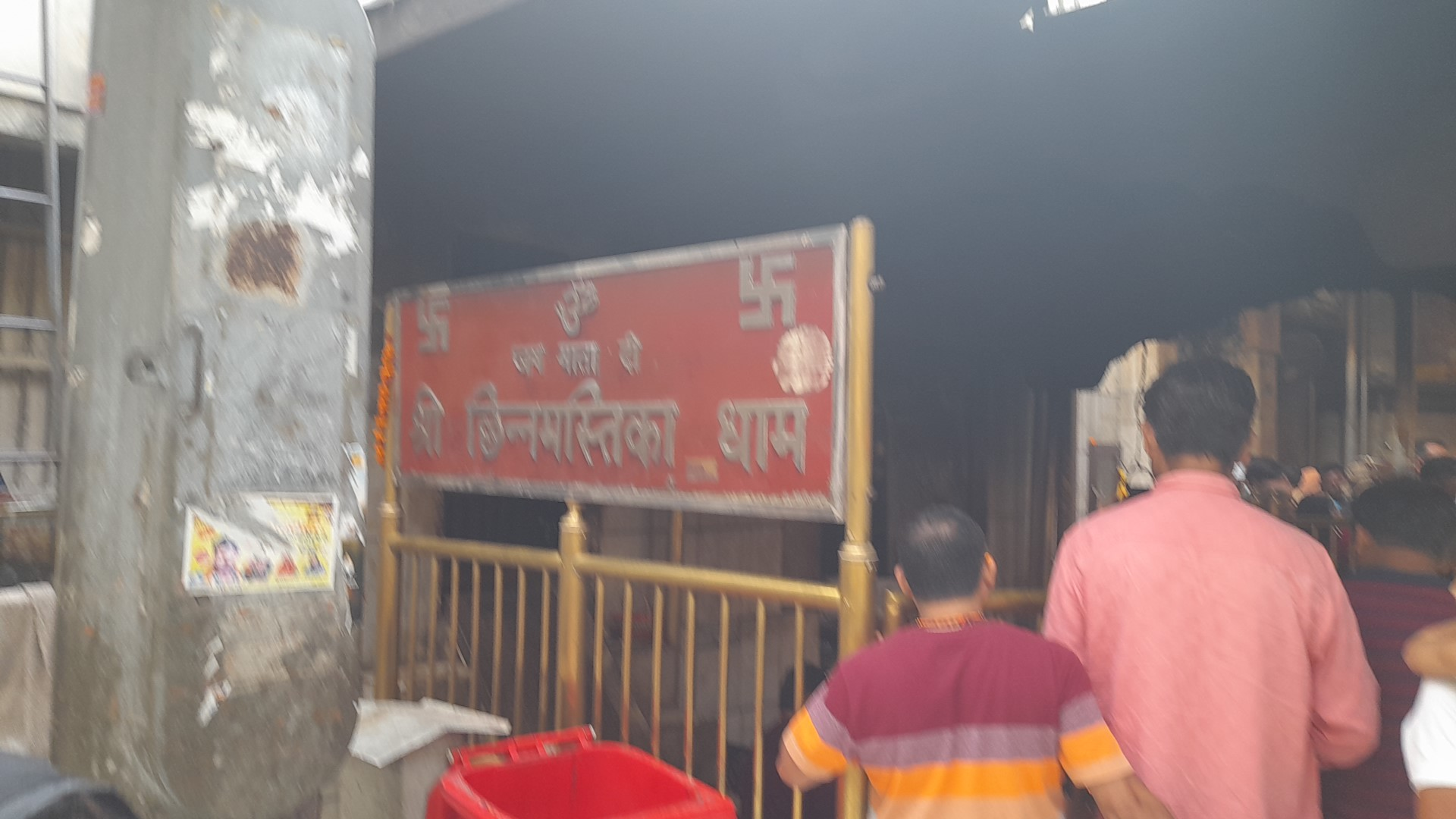
temple another view

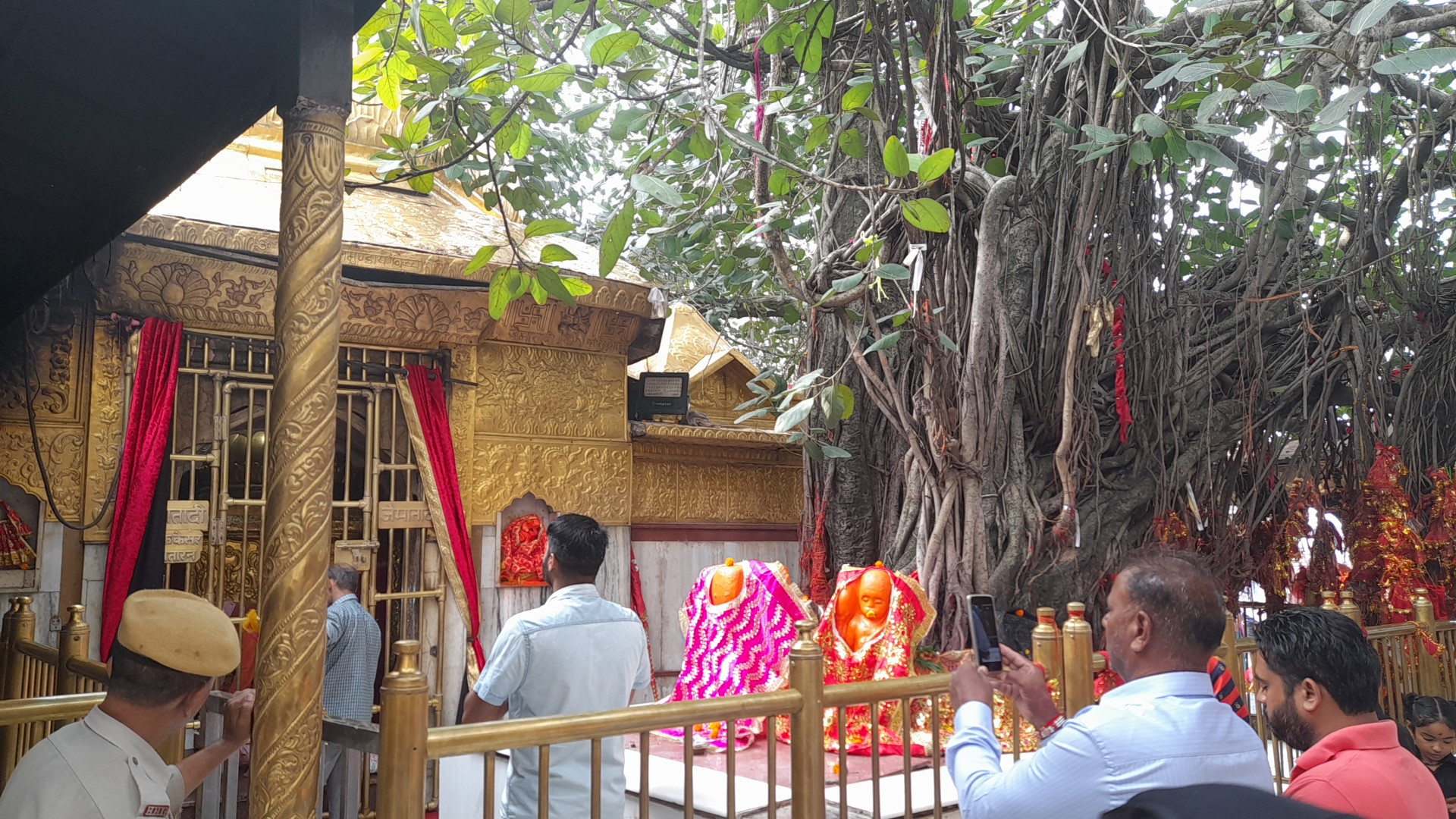
left side view

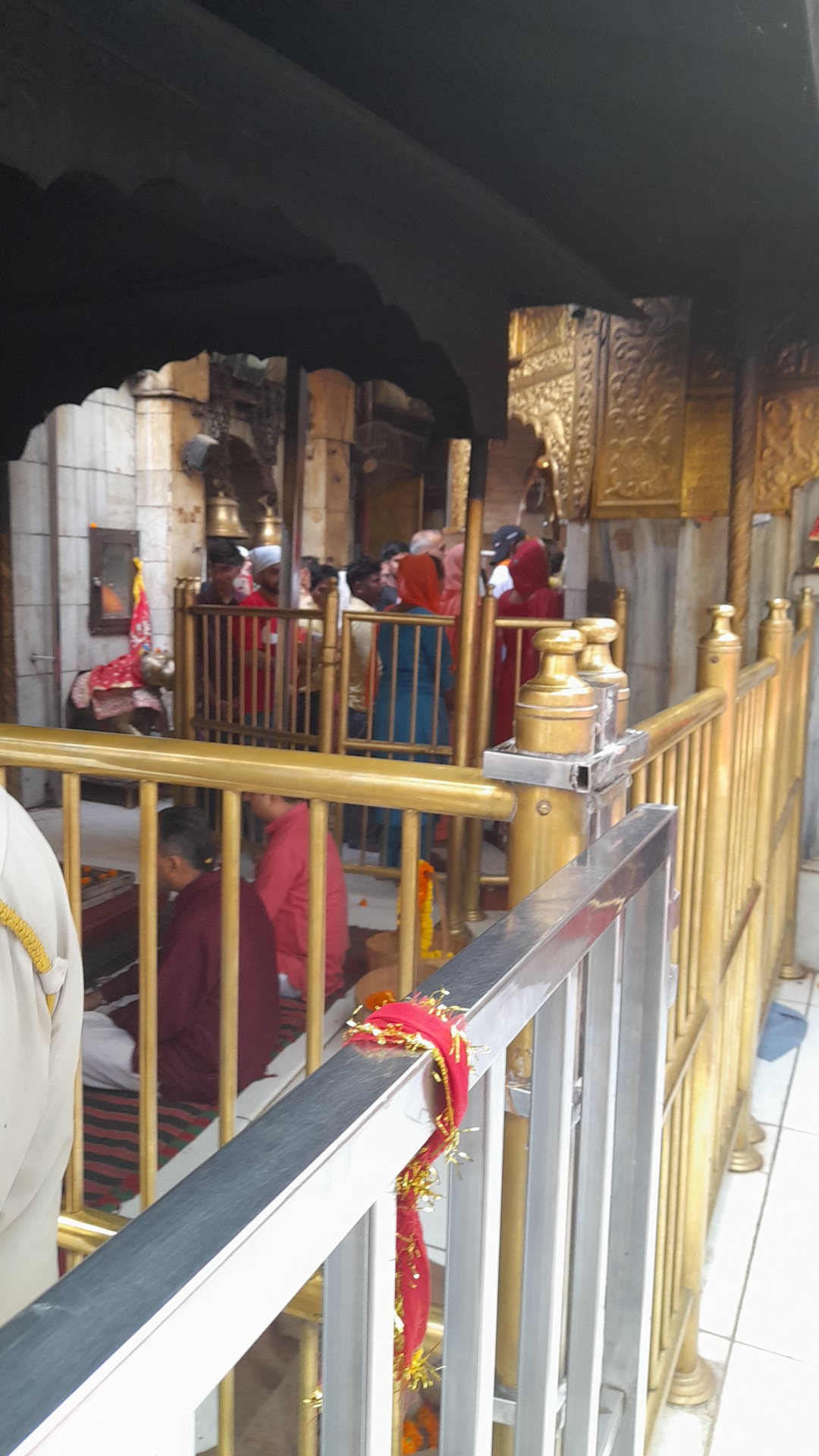
barricade

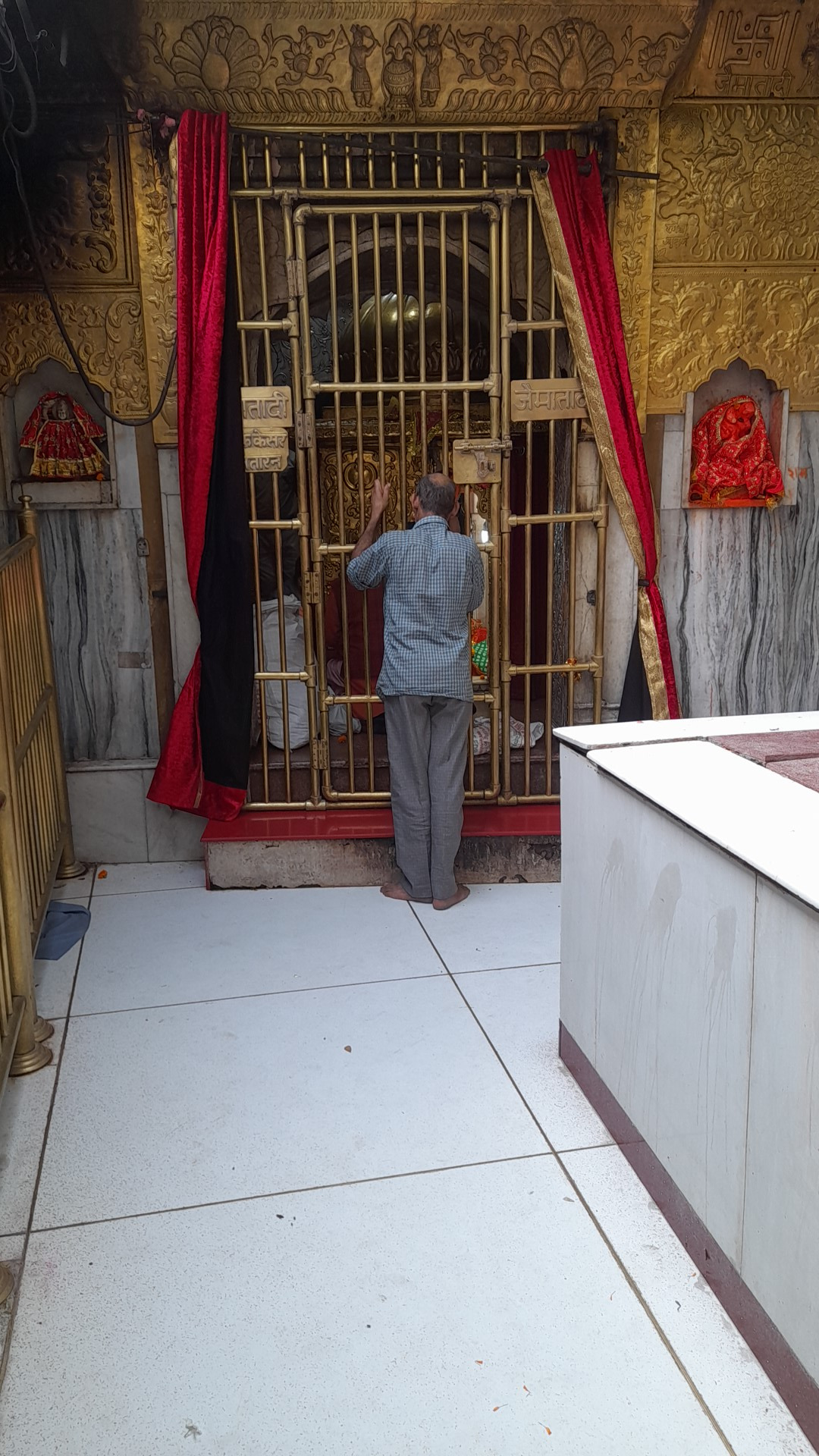
temple inside -side view

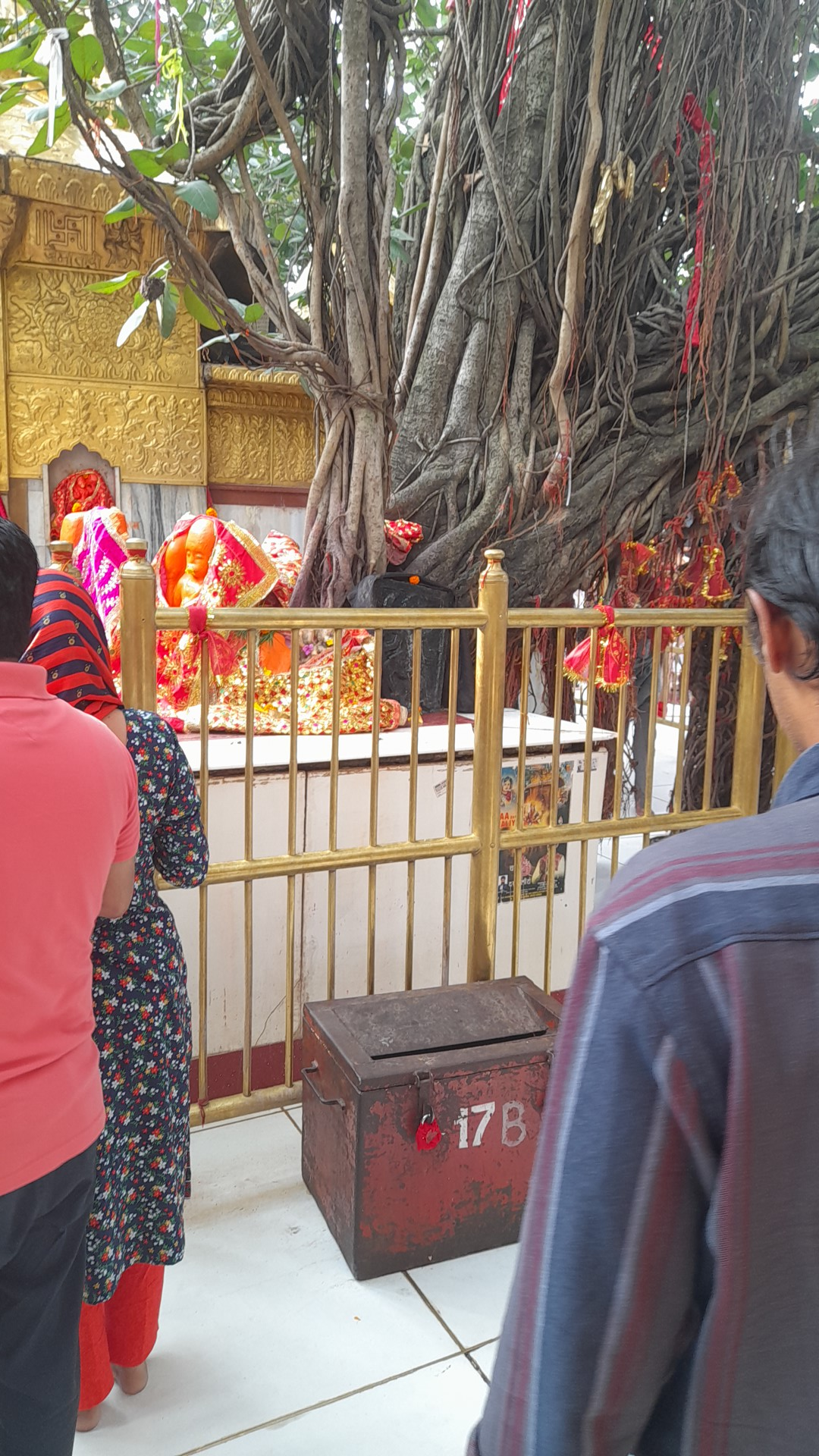
big banian tree outside
