= Una district =

District in Himachal Pradesh, India

- District of Himachal Pradesh
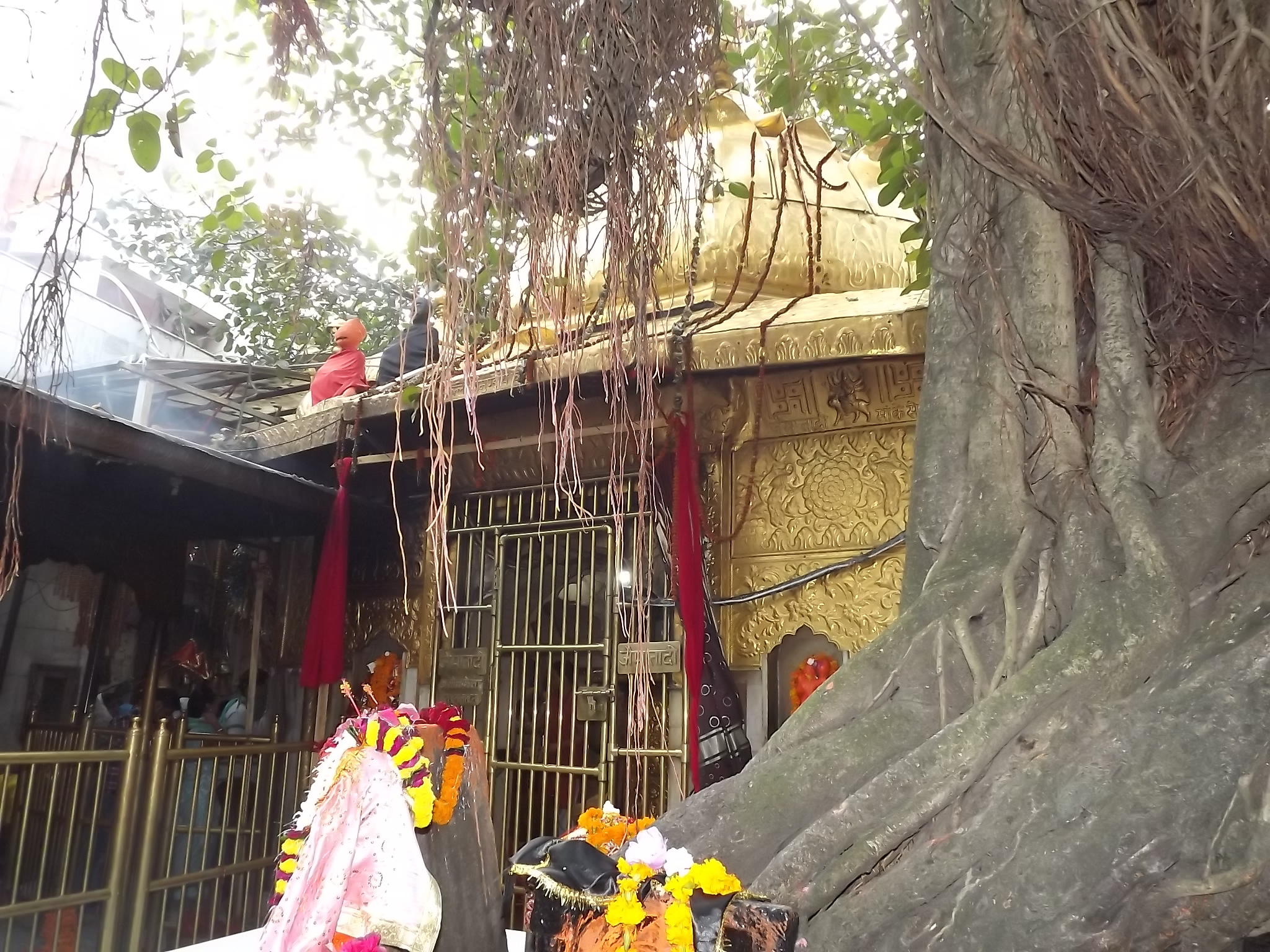
- Chintpurni Devi Temple

- Location in Himachal Pradesh
- Coordinates (Una, Himachal Pradesh, India): 31°28′34″N 76°16′13″E
- Country: India
- State: Himachal Pradesh
- Established: 1 September 1972
- Headquarters: Una
- Tehsils: 5

Government
  - Parliamentary Constituency: Hamirpur
  - Member of Parliament: Anurag Thakur

Area
  - Total: 1,540 km^{2} (590 sq mi)

Population (2011)
  - Total: 521,173
  - Density: 338/km^{2} (877/sq mi)
  - Urban: 8.8%

Demographics
  - Literacy: 87.23%
  - Sex ratio: 977
  - Official: Hindi
  - Local: Pahari; Punjabi

Languages
- Time zone: UTC+05:30 (IST)
- Vehicle registration: HP-72 (District RTO)
- Average annual precipitation: 1253 mm
- Website: http://hpuna.nic.in/

Una district is a district in the Indian state of Himachal Pradesh. Una shares its border with the Hoshiarpur and Rupnagar districts of Punjab and Kangra, Hamirpur, and Bilaspur districts of Himachal Pradesh. The terrain is generally plain with semi hills.

Una has five tehsils, namely Ghanari, Haroli, Amb, Bangana and Una itself. It was a tehsil of Hoshiarpur district until the Punjab Reorganisation Act, 1966 and Kangra district until 1972, after which it became a district of Himachal Pradesh.

== Geography ==
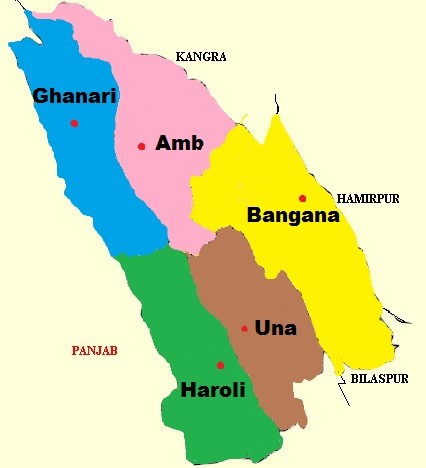
Tehsils of Una district

Una lies in the western part of Himachal Pradesh, with the Sivalik Hills of the Himalayas rolling on the western side and Solah Singhi range on the eastern side. The Satluj river alongside Shahtalai, known for the shrine of Baba Balak Nath passes through south of district near Nangal Dam and Beas passes at the north of district near Pong Dam, Talwara.

The altitude varies from more than 409 meters in plains to over 1200 meters in hills. Swan River which is basically seasonal river and also known as soul of district Una flows 65 km right across the Jaswan Valley towards south until it submerges in the Sutlej river near Anandpur.

== Demographics ==
Historical population
Year	Pop.	±% p.a.
1901	165,000	—
1911	161,786	−0.20%
1921	161,856	+0.00%
1931	170,620	+0.53%
1941	194,249	+1.31%
1951	196,829	+0.13%
1961	226,696	+1.42%
1971	261,357	+1.43%
1981	317,422	+1.96%
1991	378,269	+1.77%
2001	448,273	+1.71%
2011	521,173	+1.52%

According to the 2011 census, Una district has a population of 521,173, giving it a ranking of 543rd in India (out of a total of 640). The district has a population density of 338 inhabitants per square kilometre (880/sq mi). Its population growth rate over the decade 2001-2011 was 16.24%. Una has a sex ratio of 977 females for every 1000 males, and a literacy rate of 87.23%. 8.62% of the population lives in urban areas. Scheduled Castes and Scheduled Tribes make up 22.16% and 1.65% of the population, respectively.

Religions in Una district (2011)
Religion	Percent
Hinduism	92.13%
Sikhism	4.99%
Islam	2.74%
Other or not stated	0.14%

=== Language ===
Languages of Una district (2011)
1. Hindi (39.5%)
2. Punjabi (29.7%)
3. Pahadi (23.4%)
4. Haryanvi (3.34%)
5. Dogri (1.01%)
6. Others (3.06%)

Local languages are Hindi, Punjabi and Pahari. Punjabi is mostly used in plain areas of Tehsil Ghanari, Haroli Tehsil, Tehsil Una, and parts of Tehsil Amb. In other areas like Tehsil Bangana and Chintpurni (Part of Amb Tehsil) Pahari dialect is spoken.

== Politics ==
This is the list of current Member of Legislative Assembly from Una district:

Chintpurni (SC)	Sudarshan Singh Babloo	Indian National Congress	
Gagret	Rakesh Kalia	Indian National Congress	Elected on 4 Jun 2024
Haroli	Mukesh Agnihotri	Indian National Congress	Deputy Chief Minister
Una	Satpal Singh Satti	Bharatiya Janata Party	
Kutlehar	Vivek Sharma	Indian National Congress	Elected on 4 Jun 2024

== Education ==
=== Schools ===
- Mount Carmel School, Una
- St. D.R. Public School, Gagret
- Dashmesh Public School Gurplah Sahib
- DAV Sr Sec Public School, Ambota
- Himalayan Convent, Bhanjal
- Jawahar Navodaya Vidyalaya, Una
- Mount Everest Model High School, Mehatpur
- PAR Model High School, Dohgi
- Sai Public School
- Saraswati School, Rampur
- Sunrise Public Sr Sec School, Saloh
- Vashist Public School

== Places near Una ==
- Joh, Una
- Dharamshala
- McLeod Ganj
- Kangra
- Hoshiarpur
- Khajjiar
- Jawalamukhi
- Chandigarh
- Pragpur
