= Haridwar–Una Link Janshatabdi Express =

Railway in India

Overview
- Service type: Janshatabdi, Superfast Express
- First service: 30 June 2010
- Current operator: Northern Railways

Route
- Termini: Haridwar (HW); Una (UHL)
- Stops: 12
- Distance travelled: 368 km (229 mi)
- Average journey time: 7 hours 25 minutes as 12063, 8 hours 55 minutes as 12064.
- Service frequency: Tri-weekly
- Train number: 12063 / 12064

On-board services
- Class: 2nd Class seating only
- Seating arrangements: Yes
- Sleeping arrangements: No
- Catering facilities: No pantry car
- Observation facilities: Runs combined with 12053 / 12054 Amritsar Haridwar Jan Shatabdi Express until Ambala Cant Junction then attached to 12057 / 12058 Una Jan Shatabdi Express.

Technical
- Rolling stock: ICF coach
- Track gauge: 1,676 mm (5 ft 6 in)
- Operating speed: 110 km/h (68 mph) maximum, 46 km/h (29 mph) average including halts

The 12063 / 12064 Haridwar–Una Link Jan Shatabdi Express is a Superfast Express train of the Jan Shatabdi category belonging to Indian Railways – Northern Railway zone that runs between Haridwar Junction and Una in India.

It operates as train number 12063 from Haridwar Junction to Una and as train number 12064 in the reverse direction, serving the state of Uttarakhand, Uttar Pradesh, Haryana, Chandigarh, Punjab & Himachal Pradesh.

== Coaches ==
The 12063 / 64 |Haridwar–Una Link Jan Shatabdi Express presently has only 2 Second Class seating coaches. It does not have a pantry car.

As is customary with most train services in India, coach composition may be amended at the discretion of Indian Railways depending on demand.

== Service ==
The 12063 Haridwar–Una Link Jan Shatabdi Express covers the distance of 368 kilometres in 7 hours 40 mins (48.00 km/h) and in 8 hours 55 mins as 12064 Una–Haridwar Link Jan Shatabdi Express (41.27 km/h).

Despite the average speed of the train being below 55 km/h, its fare includes a Superfast Express surcharge as both the trains to which its coaches are attached. i.e. 12053 / 54 Amritsar Haridwar Jan Shatabdi Express & 12057 / 58 Una Jan Shatabdi Express are classed as Superfast Express.

== Routeing ==
The 12063 / 64 Haridwar–Una Link Jan Shatabdi Express runs from Haridwar Junction via Saharanpur Junction, Ambala Cant Junction, Chandigarh, Rupnagar to Una.

== Traction ==
As the route is partly electrified & due to the train being attached to 2 different trains, a Ludhiana-based WDM-3A locomotive hauls the train until Ambala Cant Junction along with the 12053 / 54 Amritsar Haridwar Jan Shatabdi Express, handing over to a Ghaziabad-based WAP-5 which powers the train along with the Una Jan Shatabdi Express for the remainder of the journey.

== Timings ==
12064 Una–Haridwar Link Jan Shatabdi Express leaves Una every Monday, Wednesday & Saturday at 05:00 hrs IST and reaches Haridwar Junction at 13:55 hrs IST the same day.

12063 Haridwar–Una Link Jan Shatabdi Express leaves Haridwar Junction every Tuesday, Friday & Sunday at 14:30 hrs IST and reaches Una at 22:10 hrs IST the same day.
