= Rupnagar (disambiguation) =

Rupnagar is a city and a municipal council in Rupnagar district in the Indian state of Punjab.

Rupnagar may also refer to:

== Bangladesh ==
- Rupnagar Residential Area, a residential area in Dhaka, Bangladesh

== India ==
- Rupnagar Assembly constituency, a Legislative Assembly Constituency in Punjab, India
- Rupnagar district, a district in Punjab, India
- Rupnagar railway station, railway station of Rupnagar, Punjab, India
- Rupnagar, Guwahati, a locality in Guwahati, Assam, India
- Rupnagar, Jaynagar, a village in West Bengal, India
- Rupnagar wetland, a.k.a Ropar Wetland
- Rupnagar Lok Sabha Constituency, a.k.a Ropar Lok Sabha Constituency, former Lok Sabha Constituency

== Nepal ==
- Rupnagar, Nepal, a village in Nepal
