= Kangarh, Rupnagar =

Human settlement in India

Kangarh is a village in the tehsil/mandal of Nurpur Bedi in the Rupnagar district of Punjab. It is situated near the hills of Shivalik. It is around 3 km from Nurpur Bedi. It is under the Lok Sabha constituency of Anandpur Sahib, as well as under the Vidhan sabha constituency of Ropar. It is located on Nurpur Bedi- Ropar road. This village is dominated by Chauhan gurjars.

== History ==
After 17 battles between Chauhan King Prithviraj and Shahabuddin Muhammad Ghori, Ghori won with false tactics. Afterward, Delhi was destroyed and plundered, so many people from nearby villages migrated to other places. One major group of Chauhans shifted to places near Rupnagar and settled there. They established village Kalar in the suburb of Balachor, but the land was not fertile so some of them shifted near Nurpur Bedi and built villages - Kangarh, Tedewal and Jhandian Khurd. One of them was Kangarh. Kangarh was thus constructed by Chauhans and they managed to make it prosperous in a short span. Kangarh is approximately 300 years old.

== Prominent people ==
Kangarh is known for village of late Chaudhary Dhani Ram Chauhan, late Chaudhary Lalchand Chauhan DFO Gurdass Chaudhary and Late Inspector Radha Krishan Chauhan coined the name of Kangarh in Rupnagar.

== Environment ==
The foothills of the Shiwalik Range are forested. Some areas are protected. There are areas of public (village council) and private ownership. Local fauna includes: sambar, muntjacs (barking deer), woodpeckers, peacocks, parrots and forest pigs.

== Climate ==
Kangarh has a humid subtropical climate characterized by a seasonal rhythm with very hot summers, mild winters, unreliable rainfall and great variation in temperature (-1 °C to 41.2 °C). The average annual rainfall is 1110.7 mm. Spring temperatures vary between a maximum of 16 °C to 25 °C and minimums 9 °C to 18 °C and the climate is pleasant. Summer is from mid-May to mid-June. Rarely there are very hot days to 45 °C. Temperatures generally remain between 35 and 40 °C (95 and 104 °F). The monsoon season lasts from mid-June to mid-September. Knagarh receives moderate to heavy rainfall and sometimes heavy to very heavy rainfall (generally during the month of August or September). Usually, the rain bearing monsoon winds blow from south-west / south-east. The maximum amount of rain received by Kangarh in a single day was 200.5 mm in a single day. Autumn is from mid-March to April. The temperature may rise to a maximum of 36 °C. Temperatures usually remain between 16° and 27°. The minimum temperature is around 11 °C. Winters last from November to mid-March. The temperature is mild but can get chilly. Average temperatures in the winter are (max) 7 °C to 15 °C and (min) -3 °C to 5 °C. Rain comes from the west and usually a lasts for 2–3 days, sometimes with hail.

== Famous and sacred places ==
Kangarh village has many sacred places like Lakh Data peer mandir, Shah Meer mandir, Kutia Bhuriwale and Lord Shiva mandir.

It has one of the best and biggest government senior secondary schools in the area.

Along with this, jungle resort Kikar Lodge is also in the suburb of this village.
