= Ropar (disambiguation) =

Ropar is the old name of Rupnagar, a city in Punjab, India.

Ropar may also refer to:

- Ropar Meeting, 1831 meeting between Maharaja Ranjit Singh and Lord William Bentinck, Governor-General of the East India Company
- Ropar Wetland, a man-made freshwater riverine and lacustrine wetland in Punjab, India
- Ropar District, a.k.a Rupnagar District
