= Assarpur =

- village
- Location in Punjab, India Assarpur (India)
- Coordinates: 30.3291°N 76.4880°E
- Country: India
- State: Punjab

Languages
  - Official: Punjabi
- Time zone: UTC+5:30 (IST)

Assarpur is a small village in the district of Ropar, Punjab region, India.
