= Amb Andaura railway station =

Railway station in Himachal Pradesh

Amb Andaura Railway Station
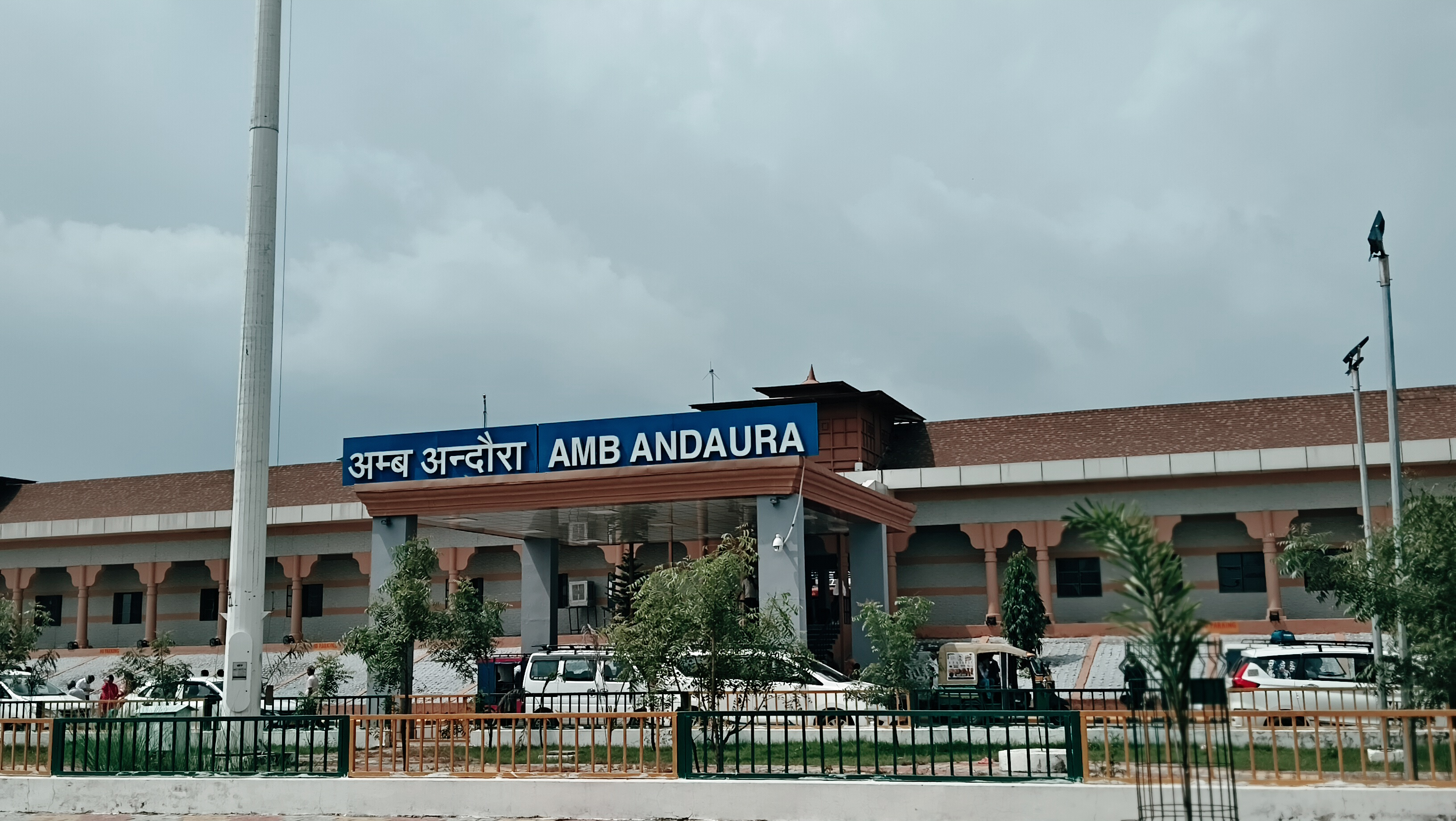
- Amb Andaura Railway station, c. 2026

General information
- Location: Andaura, Himachal Pradesh; India
- Coordinates: 31.6705°N 76.1104°E
- Elevation: 462.1 metres (1,516 ft)
- System: Indian Railways station
- Owner: Indian Railways
- Line: Single broad gauge
- Platforms: 2
- Tracks: 3
- Connections: Auto stand

Construction
- Structure type: Standard (on-ground station)
- Parking: Yes
- Cycle facilities: No

Other information
- Status: Active
- Station code: AADR
- Zone(s): Northern Railway
- Division(s): Ambala

History
- Opened: 2010
Location
- Location within India Location within Himachal Pradesh

Amb Andaura Railway Station is situated in Amb Tehsil of Una district, Himachal Pradesh. Its code is AADR. It serves Gagret and Amb towns. The station consists of two Platforms and 3 Tracks . It provide facilities including Drinking water and Sanitation. The station is serviced by the only broad-gauge line in Himachal Pradesh.

== Major trains ==
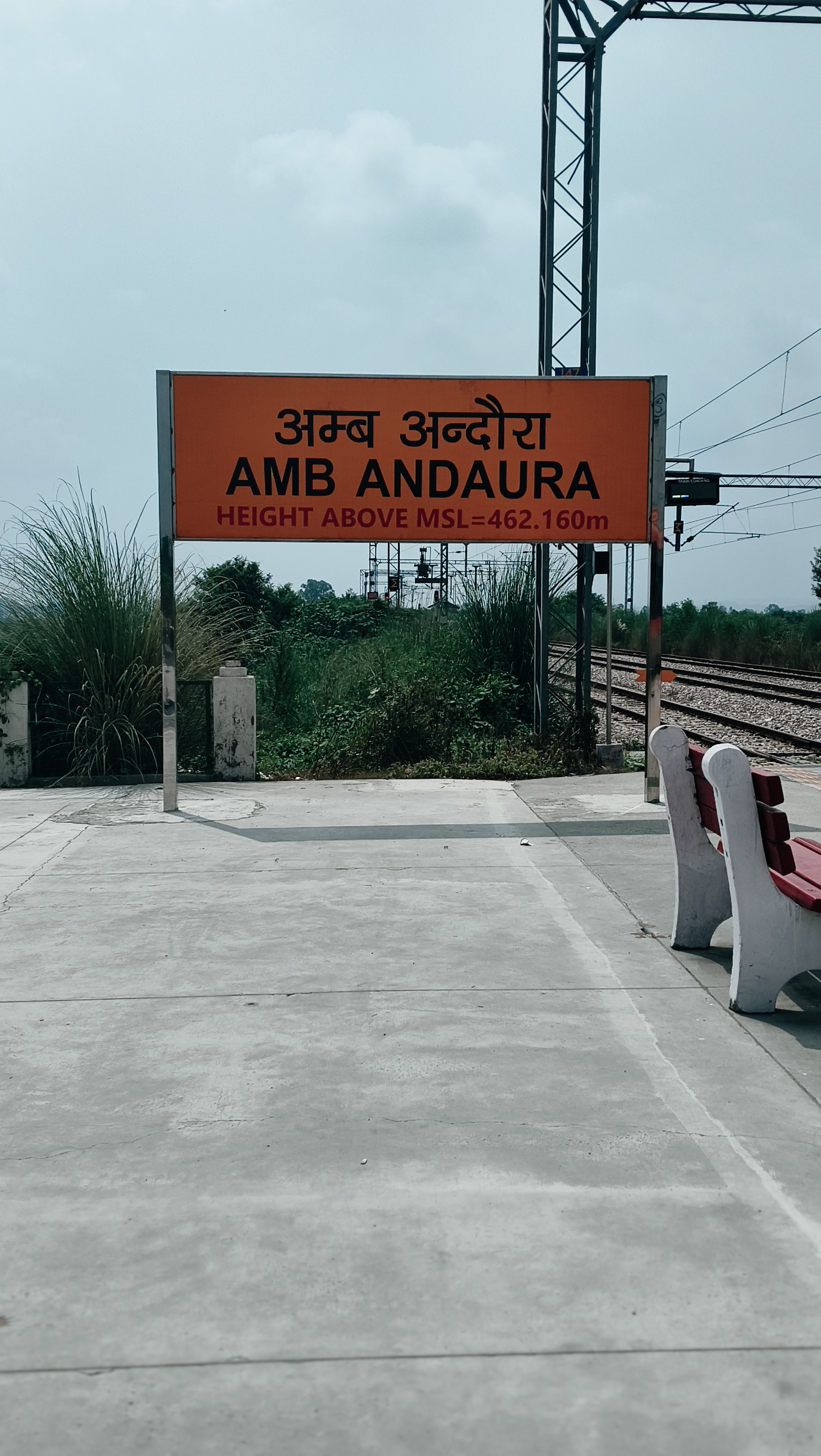
Station sign board

- New Delhi – Amb Andaura Vande Bharat Express
- Sabarmati Express
- Daulatpur chowk express
- Daulatpur Chowk–New Delhi Jan Shatabdi Express
- Huzur sahib nanded weekly sf express
- Himachal Express
- Amb Andaura–Ambala DMU
