= National Highway 344A (India) =

National highway in India

National Highway 344A
- Map of the National Highway in red

Route information
- Length: 88 km (55 mi)

Major junctions
- North end: Phagwara
- South end: Rupnagar

Location
- Country: India
- States: Punjab

Highway system
- Roads in India; Expressways; National; State; Asian
← NH 44	→ NH 205

National Highway 344A, commonly called NH 344A is a national highway in India. It is a spur road of National Highway 44. NH-344A traverses the state of Punjab in India.

== Route ==
Phagwara, Phagwara bypass, Banga, Nawanshahr, Balachur, Rupnagar.

== Junctions ==
NH 44 Terminal near Phagwara.
NH 344B near Phagwara bypass.
NH 205 Terminal near Rupnagar.

== Upgradation ==
In 2016, the NHAI issued letter of award for four laning of 344A. Upgradation project includes 4 structures (Grade separator/flyover), 1 major bridge, 22 minor bridges, one vehicular underpass and one pedestrian underpass.

== See also ==
- List of national highways in India
- List of national highways in India by state

== Notes ==
- In first notification for S.N. 262, route Hoshiarpur - Nawanshahr - Rupnagar was named as NH 103A. This has been replaced as NH 344A, route from Phagwara to Rupnagar.
