= New Delhi–Amb Andaura Vande Bharat Express =

Vande Bharat Express train route in India

New Delhi - Amb Andaura Vande Bharat Express

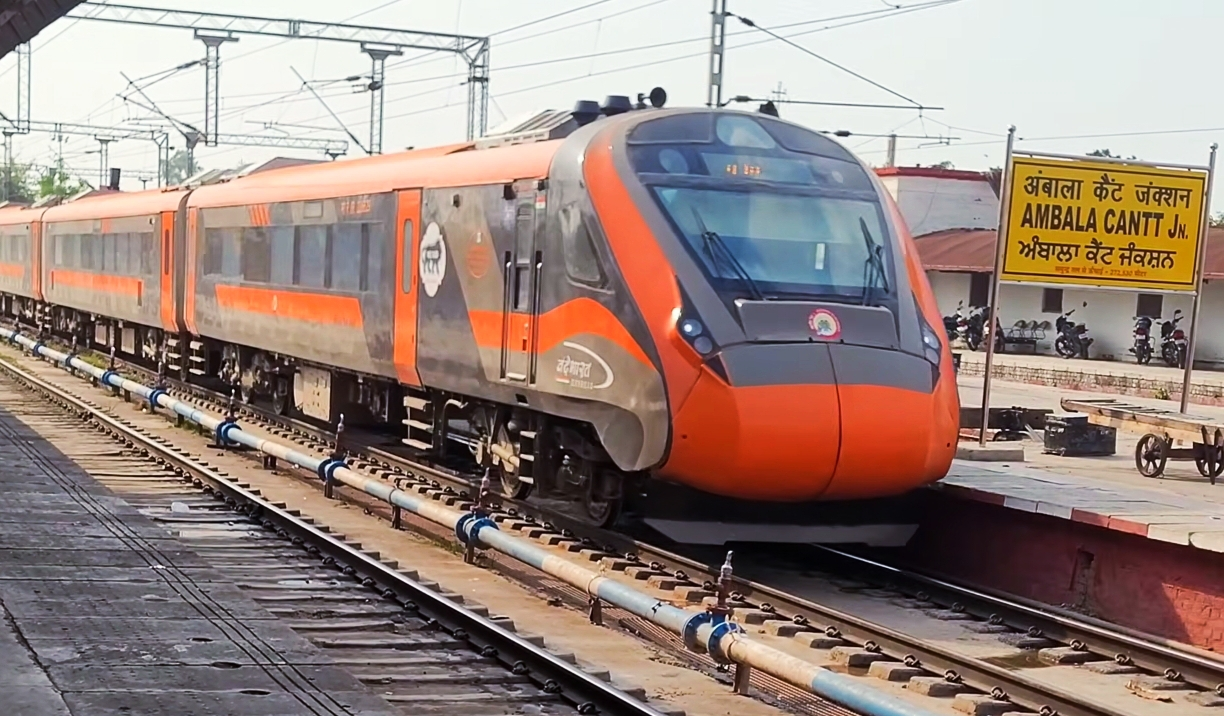
- New Delhi - Amb Andaura Vande Bharat Express At Ambala cantt Junction

Overview
- Service type: Vande Bharat Express
- Locale: Delhi, Haryana, Chandigarh, Punjab and Himachal Pradesh
- First service: 13 October 2022; 4 years ago
- Current operator: Northern Railways (NR)

Route
- Termini: New Delhi (NDLS); Amb Andaura (AADR)
- Stops: 5
- Distance travelled: 437 km (272 mi)
- Average journey time: 5h 22 mins (5 hours 20 mins (up), 5 hours 25 mins (down))
- Service frequency: Six days a week (Note: Except Tuesdays)
- Train number: 22447 / 22448
- Lines used: New Delhi - Kalka (till Chandigarh Jn); Chandigarh - Amb Andaura line

On-board services
- Classes: AC Chair Car, AC Executive Chair Car
- Seating arrangements: Airline style; Rotatable seats
- Sleeping arrangements: No
- Catering facilities: On-board catering
- Observation facilities: Large windows in all coaches
- Entertainment facilities: On-board WiFi; Infotainment System; Electric outlets; Reading light; Seat Pockets; Bottle Holder; Tray Table
- Baggage facilities: Overhead racks

Technical
- Rolling stock: Vande Bharat 1.0
- Track gauge: Indian gauge 1,676 mm (5 ft 6 in) broad gauge
- Electrification: 25 kV 50 Hz AC Overhead line
- Operating speed: 76 km/h (47 mph) to 79 km/h (49 mph) (Avg.)
- Average length: 384 metres (1,260 ft) (16 coaches)
- Track owner: Indian Railways
- Rake maintenance: New Delhi (Shakur Basti DEMU Care Center)

The 22447/22448 New Delhi - Amb Andaura Vande Bharat Express is India's 4th Vande Bharat Express train, connecting the states of New Delhi, Haryana, Chandigarh, Punjab, and Himachal Pradesh.

== Overview ==
This train is operated by Indian Railways, connecting New Delhi, Ambala Cantt. Jn, Chandigarh Jn, Anandpur Sahib, Nangal Dam, Una Himachal and Amb Andaura. It is currently operated with train numbers 22447/22448 on 6 days a week basis.

== Rakes ==
It was flagged off with the improved 2nd Generation Vande Bharat Express train and was designed and manufactured by the Integral Coach Factory (ICF) under the leadership of Sudhanshu Mani at Perambur, Chennai under the Make in India initiative. However, once the 22439/22440 NDLS SVDK Vande Bharat was given the latest Vande Bharat 3.0 rakes, its Vande Bharat 1.0 rake was given to this train.

== Service ==
The 22447/22448 New Delhi - Amb Andaura Vande Bharat Express operates six days a week except Tuesdays, covering a distance of 437 km (272 mi) in a travel time of 5 hours 20–25 mins with an average speed of 76 km/h (47 mph)–79 km/h (49 mph). The service has 5 intermediate stops. The Maximum Permissible Speed is 130 km/h (81 mph).

== See also ==
- Vande Bharat Express
- Tejas Express
- Gatimaan Express
- New Delhi railway station
- Amb Andaura railway station
