= Gaggon =

- village
- Location in Punjab, India Gaggon (India)
- Coordinates: 30°53′31″N 76°25′27″E
- Country: India
- State: Punjab

Languages
  - Official: Punjabi
- Time zone: UTC+5:30 (IST)
- Vehicle registration: PB
- Coastline: 0 kilometres (0 mi)

Gaggon is a village in Rupnagar (Ropar) district of Punjab. It has population of 578 and total area of 2.4 km^{2}. It is 5 km from Chamkaur (an important Sikh pilgrimage site) and 12 km from district headquarters Ropar.

The village is located on Guru Gobind Singh Marg. The main communities are Jatt Sikh, Saini, Scheduled castes and Brahmins. Sikhism is the dominant faith. There are two gurudwaras, a Valmiki temple and a shrine dedicated to Gugga Pir.

Two martyrs in World War II were born in Gaggon. Major crops grown in village are wheat, rice, maize, sugarcane, etc. Nearby villages are Gadhram Kalan, Gadhram Khurd, Dehar, Salempur, Makdona Kalan, Makdona Khurd, Rampur Bet.

The village has a Government Senior Secondary School and a Veterinary Hospital.
