= Sihon Majra =

- Location within Punjab Location within India
- Coordinates: 30°52′34.27″N 76°32′31.08″E
- Country: India
- State: Punjab
- District: Rupnagar
- Tehsil: Rupnagar

Sihon Majra is a village in Rupnagar tehsil, Rupnagar district, Punjab, India. It is on National Highway 21, 32 kilometres (20 mi) from Chandigarh, and close to the market town of Kurali.

== Infrastructure ==
A deep tube well, which supports village farmers on a user-pays basis, was installed by the government. Prosperous farmers have their own wells. The Agriculture Department opened a farmers training center in the village.

The village has a sub post office. It is linked to the main post office in Kurali.

The streets are paved and drainage is planned. The road network in and around the village is now abundant. All roads are metaled. Roads link all nearby villages such as Goslan Rormajra and Mughal Majra.

A local pond provides a fishing ground, earning good income for the village Panchayat.

Most villagers use cesspools for sanitation.

== Education ==
The state government operates all schools. The village school now offers up to year 8 education. The school has its full complement of government approved teachers. The school boasts a new primary section building. Plans to develop recreation areas are underway, with support derived from both government and private sources.

== Leadership ==
The village is led by an elected official, known colloquially as a panchayat. As a reflection of modern-day society, the panchayat generally comprises four male panches and two female panches. The village is also represented in the block samiti (the next level of governance).

According to the 2001 census, 506 people live in the village.
