= Haridwar–Amritsar Jan Shatabdi Express =

Jan Shatabdi Express train in India

Amritsar Junction - Haridwar Jan Shatabdi Express

Overview
- Service type: Superfast Express, Jan Shatabdi Express
- First service: 27 September 2006; 19 years ago
- Current operator: Northern Railways (NR)

Route
- Termini: Amritsar (ASR); Haridwar (HW)
- Stops: 9
- Distance travelled: 407 km (253 mi)
- Average journey time: 7 hours 20 minutes as 12053 Haridwar–Amritsar Jan Shatabdi Express, 7 hours 00 minutes as 12054 Amritsar–Haridwar Jan Shatabdi Express
- Service frequency: Six days a week (Note: Except Thursdays)
- Train number: 12053 / 12054

On-board services
- Classes: AC Chair Car, Second Class seating
- Seating arrangements: Yes
- Sleeping arrangements: No
- Catering facilities: No pantry car attached
- Observation facilities: Runs with slip coaches of 12063/12064 Una Jan Shatabdi Express

Technical
- Rolling stock: ICF coach
- Track gauge: 1,676 mm (5 ft 6 in)
- Operating speed: 110 km/h (70 mph) maximum, 55.82 km/h (34.68 mph) average including halts

The 12054 / 12053 Amritsar–Haridwar Jan Shatabdi Express is a Superfast Express train belonging to Indian Railways – Northern Railway zone that runs between Amritsar Junction and Haridwar Junction in India, serving the states of Punjab, Haryana, Uttar Pradesh & Uttarakhand.

It operates as train number 12054 from Amritsar Junction to Haridwar Junction and as train number 12053 in the reverse direction.

For 3 days a week, the slip coaches of 12057/58 Una Jan Shatabdi Express are attached / detached to the train at Ambala Cantonment Junction.

== Coaches ==
The 12054 / 53 Amritsar–Haridwar Jan Shatabdi Express presently has 1 AC Chair Car & 7 Second Class Jan Shatabdi seating coaches.

As is customary with most train services in India, coach composition may be amended at the discretion of Indian Railways depending on demand.

== Service ==
The 12054 / 53 Amritsar–Haridwar Jan Shatabdi Express covers the distance of 407 kilometres in 7 hours 00 mins (58.14 km/h) and in 7 hours 35 mins (53.67 km/h) as 12053 Haridwar–Amritsar Jan Shatabdi Express.

As the average speed of the train is above 55 km/h, as per Indian Railways rules, its fare includes a Superfast Express surcharge.

== Routeing ==
The 12054 / 53 Amritsar–Haridwar Jan Shatabdi Express runs from Amritsar Junction via Jalandhar City, Ludhiana, Sirhind, Ambala Cantonment Junction Saharanpur Junction to Haridwar Junction.

== Traction ==
Despite electrification of the 250 km stretch between Amritsar Junction & Ambala Cantonment Junction, a Ghaziabad-based WAP-7 or WAP-5 locomotive powers the train for its entire run.

== Timings ==
- 12054 Amritsar–Haridwar Jan Shatabdi Express leaves Amritsar Junction every day except Thursday at 06:55 hrs IST and reaches Haridwar Junction at 13:55 hrs IST on the same day.
- 12053 Haridwar–Amritsar Jan Shatabdi Express leaves Haridwar Junction every day except Thursday at 14:30 hrs IST and reaches Amritsar Junction at 22:05 hrs IST on the same day.
