= Rupnagar railway station =

Train station in Punjab, India

- Indian Railways logo

General information
- Location: NH 21, Rupnagar, Punjab; India
- Coordinates: 30.9664°N 76.5331°E
- Elevation: 277 metres (909 ft)
- System: Express train and Passenger train station
- Owner: Indian Railways
- Operator: Northern Railways
- Line: Sirhind-Una-Mukerian line
- Platforms: 2
- Tracks: 4

Construction
- Structure type: Standard (on ground station)
- Parking: Yes

Other information
- Status: Functioning
- Station code: RPAR
- Zone(s): Northern Railway zone
- Division(s): Ambala
Location
- Location within Punjab Location within India

Rupnagar railway station is a railway station in Rupnagar district, Punjab. Its code is RPAR. It is fall under Northern Railway zone's Ambala railway division. It serves Rupnagar city. The station consists of 1 platform.

== Major trains ==
Some of the important trains that run from Anandpur Sahib are:

- Himachal Express
- Una Jan Shatabdi Express
- Haridwar–Una Link Janshatabdi Express (via Chandigarh)
- Hazur Sahib Nanded–Una Himachal Express
- Gurumukhi Superfast Express
