= Una Himachal railway station =

Railway station in Himachal Pradesh, India

General information
- Location: Near Government Regional Hospital on Una – Hamirpur Highway, Una, Himachal Pradesh; India
- Coordinates: 31.4787°N 76.2751°E
- Elevation: 396.45 metres (1,300.7 ft)
- System: Indian Railways station
- Owner: Indian Railways
- Line: Sirhind-Una-Mukerian line
- Platforms: 2
- Tracks: 2
- Connections: Auto stand

Construction
- Structure type: Standard (on ground)
- Parking: Yes
- Cycle facilities: Yes

Other information
- Status: Functioning
- Station code: UHL
- Zone(s): Northern Railway
- Division(s): Ambala Division

History
- Opened: 1990
Location
- Location within India Location within Himachal Pradesh

Una Himachal railway station, code name "UHL", is an important and main station in Una district which is located near Regional Government Hospital on Una–Hamirpur Highway in Una City which is the first broad gauge of Himachal Pradesh.

The ISBT Una is 2 km from station. Auto rickshaws and cabs are available here all the time.

Una Himachal railway station is directly connected to the country's capital Delhi, Chandigarh, Gujarat (Sabarmati), Madhya Pradesh (Ujjain/Indore).

Second-class waiting room, deluxe toilets, and water coolers, are available in the station. The station has two platforms and three rail tracks. Station is well rain sheltered. Rail tracks are electrified.

== Trains ==
- 22447/22448 New Delhi - Amb Andaura Vande Bharat Express 6 days a week(except Tuesday)
- 22710/22709 Amb Andaura–Hazur Sahib Nanded Weekly Mail (Thursday)
- 12058/12057 Daulatpur Chowk–New Delhi Jan Shatabdi Express
- 14054/14053 Himachal Express
- 19411/19412 Daulatpur Chowk– Gandhinagar Capital Express
- 74992/74991 Daulatpur Chowk- Ambala Cantt DEMU (via. Chandigarh)
- 64512/64511 Amb Andaura- Haridwar MEMU (via Sirhind jn.)
- 64564/64563 Amb Andaura- Raipur Haryana MEMU ( via Chandigarh jn.)
- 19307/19308 Una Himachal - Indore jn. Exp (via Chandigarh, Saharanpur, Meerut city, Nizamuddin) (Only Friday/Saturday)

== Functional and proposed rail line ==
Himachal's first broad-gauge railway line, which was accepted in 1981–1982 general budget, from town Nangal Dam in Punjab state via Una District of Himachal Pradesh to Talwara (Punjab), which has now been completed for 59 km long at Daulatpur Chowk in District Una. the rest of 5 km formation in Himachal, it will re-enter Punjab. Further, it is also planned to connect Talwara with Mukerian city after joining Mukerian city, it will be the second railway line to Jammu.
