= Daulatpur Chowk–New Delhi Jan Shatabdi Express =

Jan Shatabdi Express train in India

Daulatpur Chowk - New Delhi - Dehradun Jan Shatabdi Express
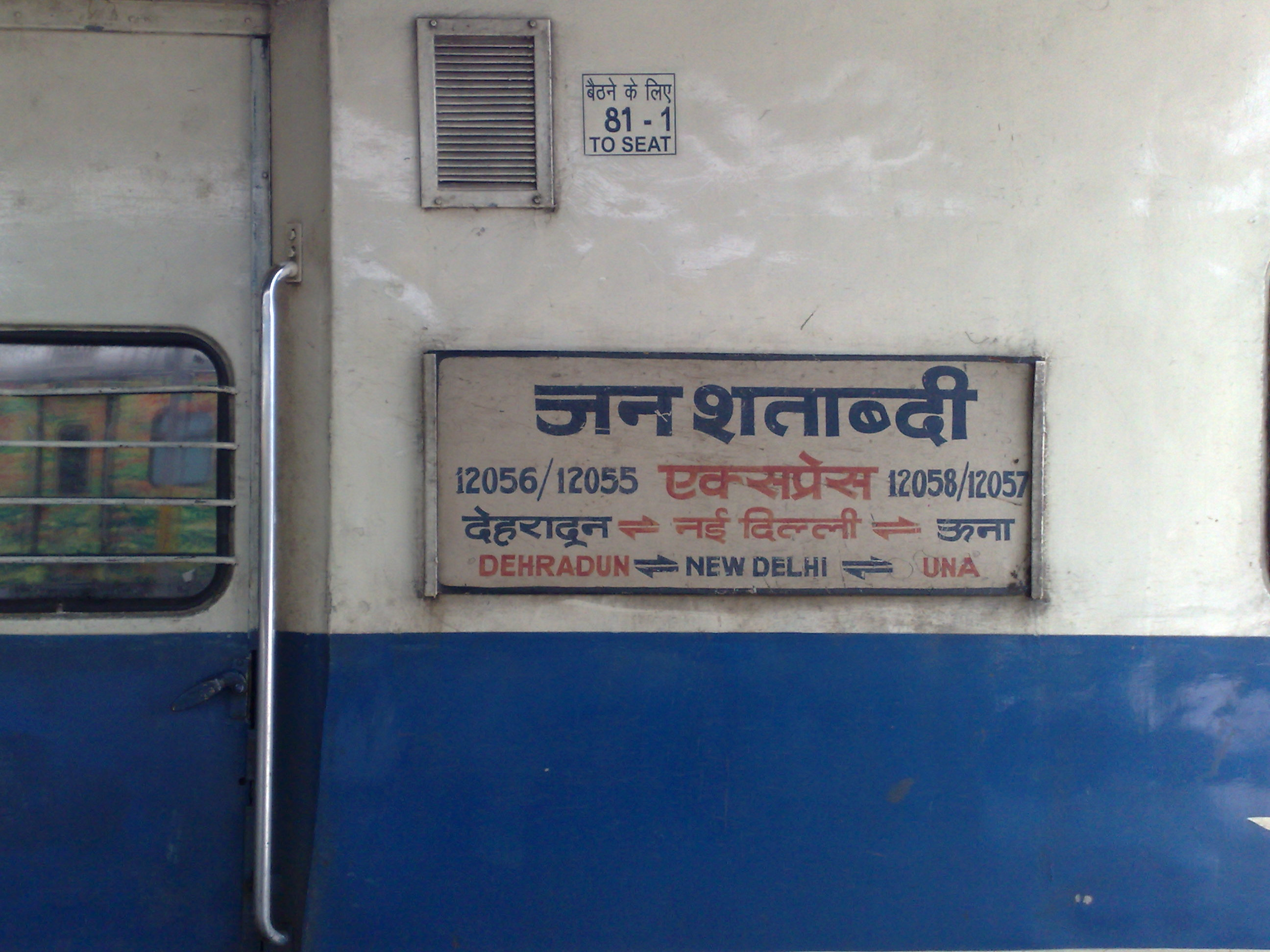

Overview
- Service type: Jan Shatabdi Express
- Locale: Himachal Pradesh, Punjab, Haryana, Delhi
- First service: 14 December 2008; 17 years ago
- Current operator: Northern Railways (NR)

Route
- Termini: Daulatpur Chowk (DLPC); New Delhi (NDLS)
- Stops: 18
- Distance travelled: 454 km (282 mi)
- Average journey time: 7 hours 37 minutes (7 hours 40 mins (up), 7 hours 35 mins (down))
- Service frequency: Daily service
- Train number: 12058 / 12057

On-board services
- Classes: AC Chair Car, Second Class seating
- Seating arrangements: Yes
- Sleeping arrangements: No
- Catering facilities: No Pantry Car attached but available
- Observation facilities: Rake Sharing with 12055/56 Dehradun Jan Shatabdi Express

Technical
- Rolling stock: LHB coach
- Track gauge: 1,676 mm (5 ft 6 in)
- Operating speed: 130 km/h (80 mph) maximum 59.54 km/h (37.00 mph), including halts
Route map
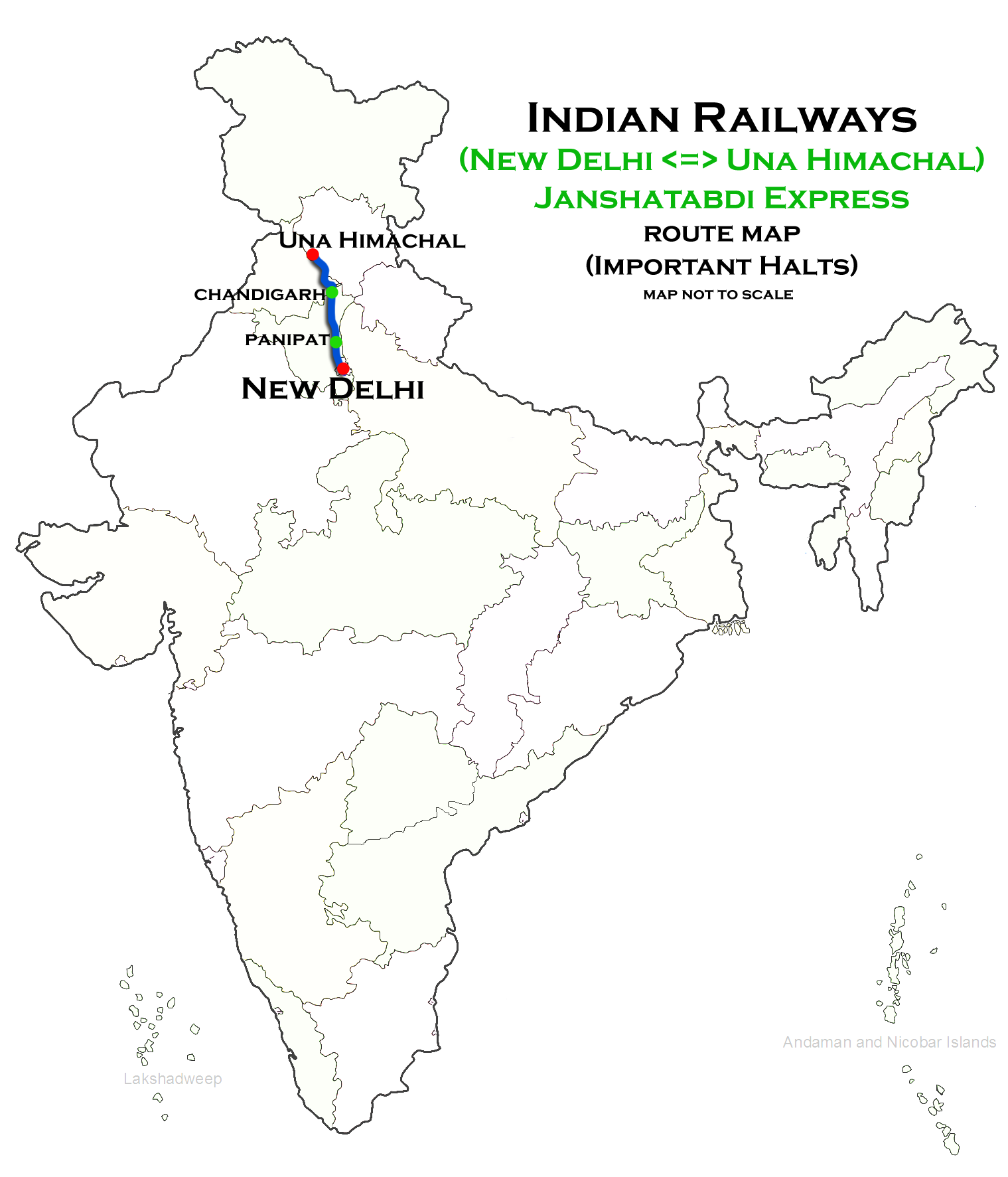
↓ 12058 • 12057 ↑

The Daulatpur Chowk- New Delhi Jan Shatabdi Express is a Superfast Express train belonging to Indian Railways - Northern Railway Division that runs between Daulatpur Chowk and New Delhi in India.

It operates as train number 12058 from Daulatpur Chowk to New Delhi via Chandigarh Junction and Train number 12057 in the reverse direction.

It serves the states of Himachal Pradesh, Punjab, Chandigarh, Haryana and Delhi. Initially it ran up to Chandigarh and was extended to Una Himachal in the year 2008, followed by Amb Andaura and ultimately to Daulatpur Chowk in 2024.

== Coaches ==
The train presently has 4 AC Chair Car and 8 Second Class Jan Shatabdi seating coaches.

As with most train services in India, coach composition may be amended at the discretion of Indian Railways depending on demand.

== Service ==
The 12057/58 Daulatpur – New Delhi Janshatabdi Express covers the distance of 454 kilometres (282 mi) in 7 hours 40 mins (59.22 km/h (36.80 mph)) as 12057 New Delhi Daulatpur Jan Shatabdi Express and in 7 hours 35 mins (59.87 km/h (37.20 mph)) as 12058 Daulatpur New Delhi Jan Shatabdi Express.

Since the average speed of the train is above 55 km/h (35 mph), as per Indian Railways rules, its fare includes a Superfast Express surcharge.

== Routeing ==
The 12057/58 New Delhi Daulatpur Janshatabdi Express runs from Daulatpur via Una Himachal, Rupnagar, Chandigarh, Ambala Cantonment Junction, Panipat Junction to New Delhi.

== Traction ==
As the route is fully electrified, a Ghaziabad-based WAP 4 / WAP 5 / WAP 7 powers the train for its entire run.

== Timings ==
12057 New Delhi Daulatpur Jan Shatabdi Express leaves New Delhi on a daily basis at 14:35 hrs IST and reaches Daulatpur at 22:15 hrs IST on the same day.

12058 Daulatpur New Delhi Jan Shatabdi Express leaves Daulatpur on a daily basis at 04:10 hrs IST and reaches New Delhi at 11:45 hrs IST on the same day.

== Gallery ==
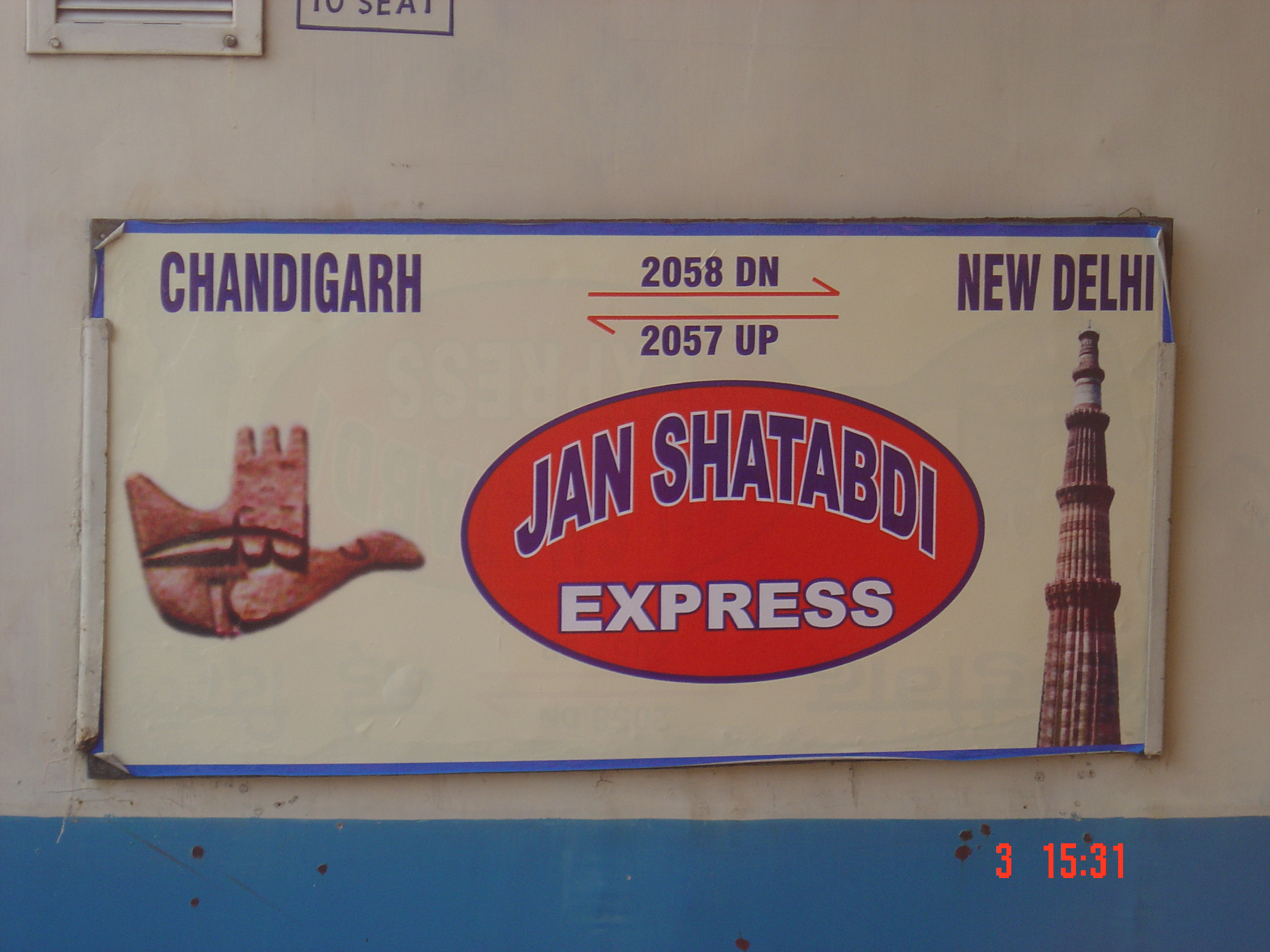
12057 Jan Shatabdi Express trainboard prior its extension to Una

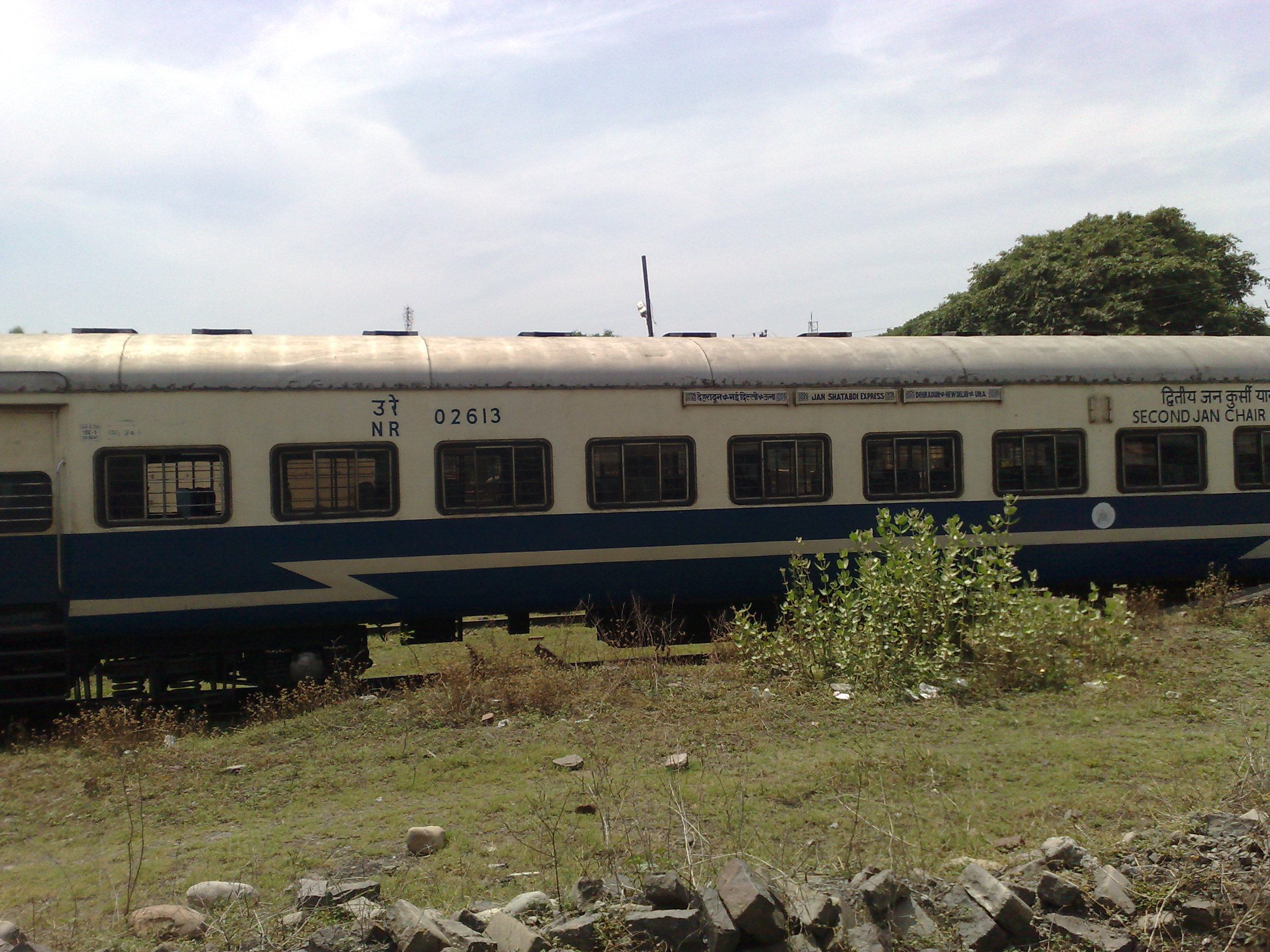
12057 Jan Shatabdi Express - Second Jan Chair Car

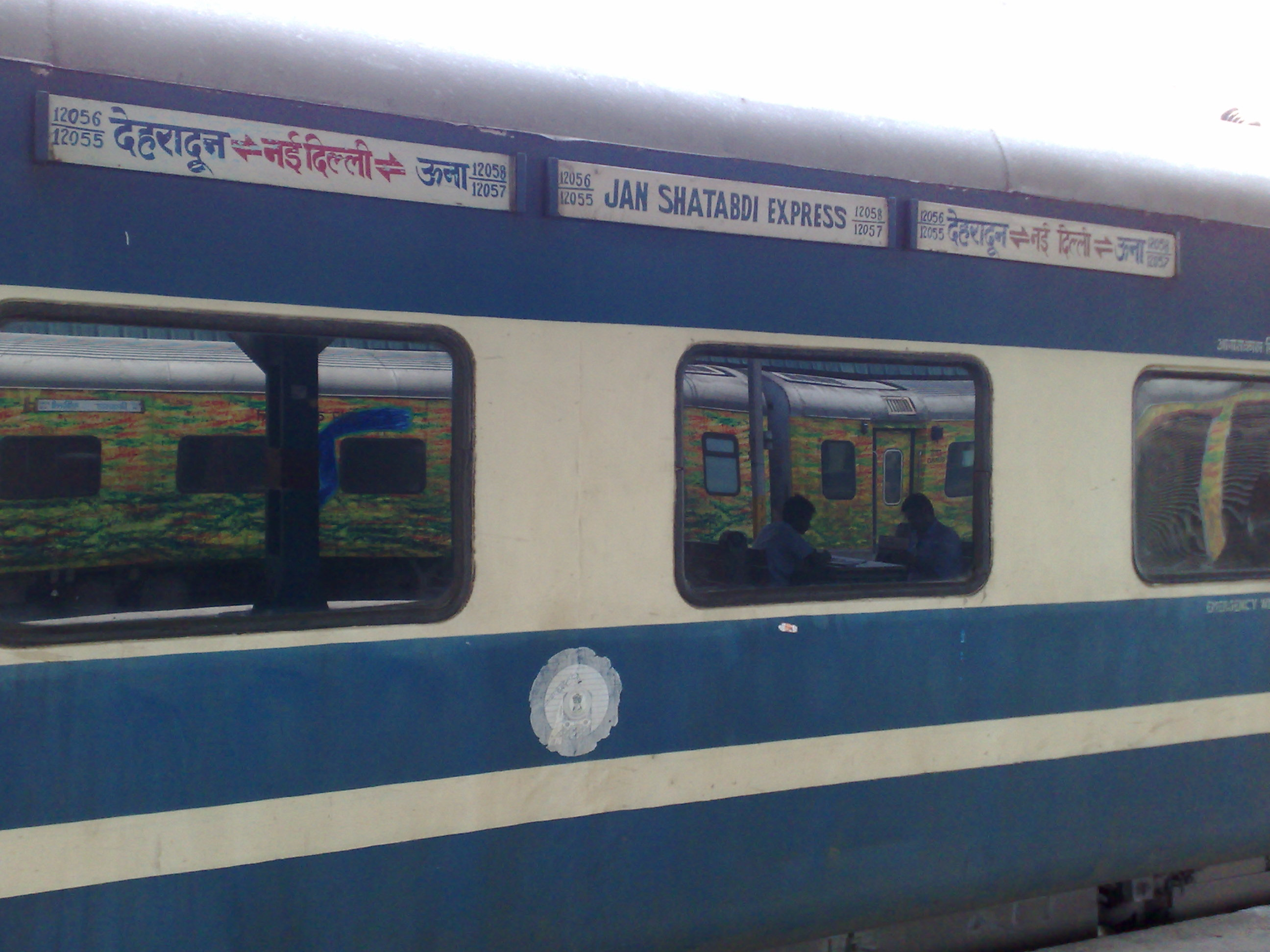
12057 Janshatabdi Express - AC Chair Car coach

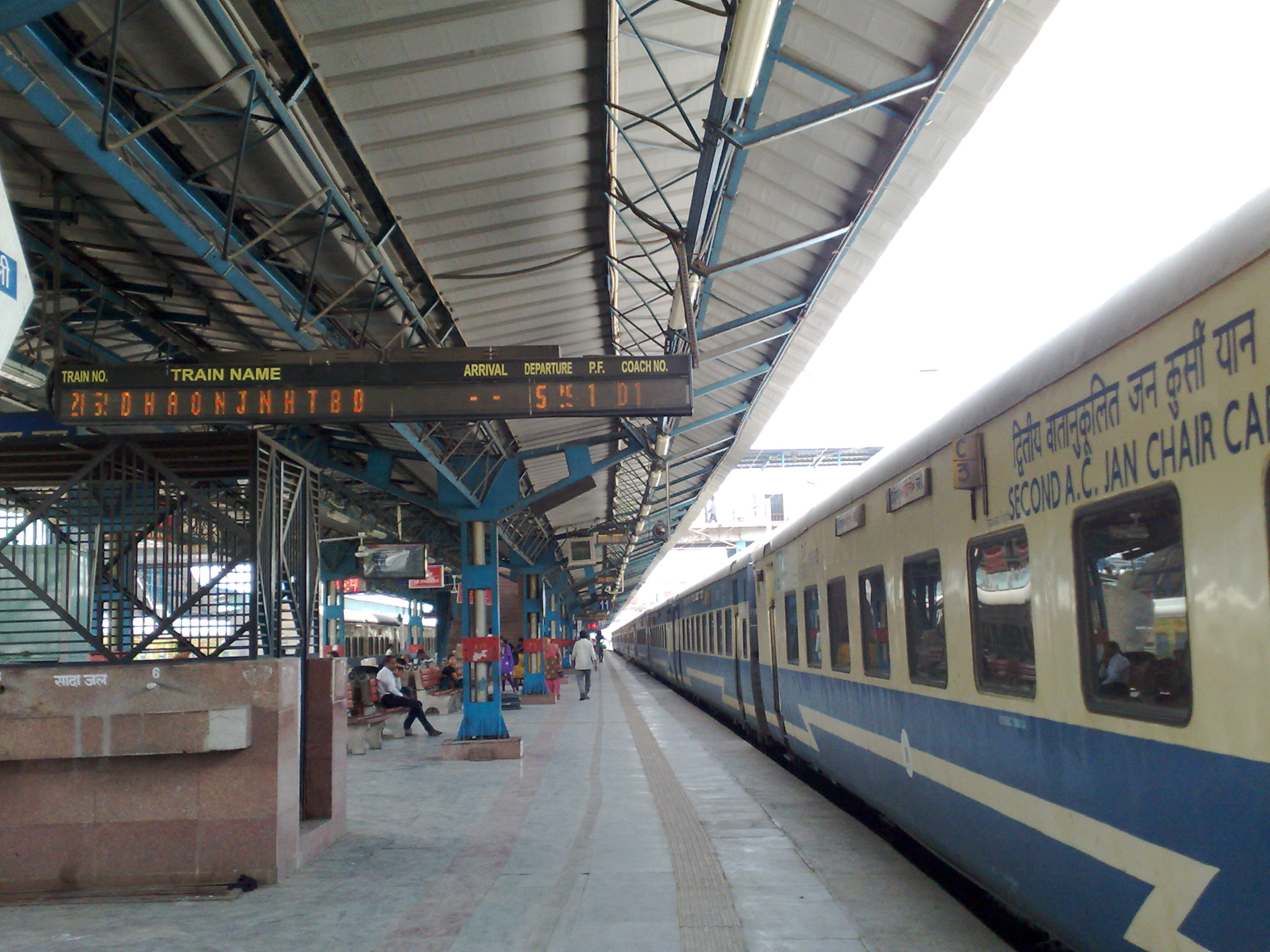
12057 Janshatabdi Express at New Delhi
