= Ameles modesta =

Scientific classification
- Kingdom: Animalia
- Phylum: Arthropoda
- Clade: Pancrustacea
- Class: Insecta
- Order: Mantodea
- Family: Amelidae
- Genus: Ameles
- Species: A. modesta

Binomial name
- Ameles modesta Bolivar, 1914

Species of praying mantis

Ameles modesta is a species of praying mantis found in Morocco.
