= Ropar Wetland =

Artificial or man-made lake

Ropar Wetland and Ropar Lake
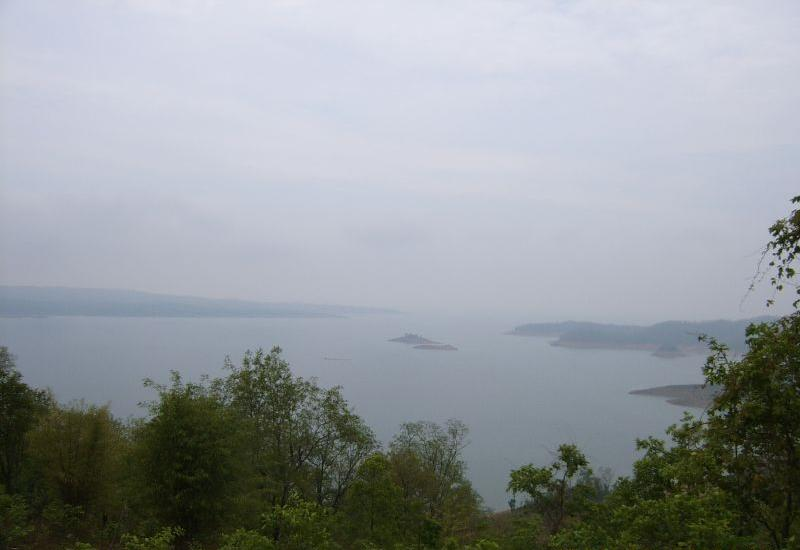
- View of Reservoir

- Location within Punjab
- Location: Punjab
- Coordinates: 31.02°N 76.50°E
- Type: Freshwater
- Primary inflows: Sutlej River
- Basin countries: India
- Surface area: 1,365 ha (3,370 acres)
- Average depth: 0.5 m (1 ft 8 in)
- Max. depth: 6 m (20 ft)
- Surface elevation: 275 m (902 ft)
- Settlements: Rupnagar

Ramsar Wetland
- Official name: Ropar
- Designated: 22 January 2002
- Reference no.: 1161

Ropar Wetland, also named Ropar Lake, is a man-made freshwater riverine and lacustrine wetland. The area has at least 9 mammal, 154 bird (migratory and local), 35 fish, 9 arthropod, 11 rotifer, 9 crustacean and 10 protozoan species, making it biologically diverse. This important ecological zone is located in the Shivalik foothills of the Lower Himalayas and was created in 1952 on the Sutlej River, in the Punjab state of India, by building a head regulator to store and divert water for beneficial uses of irrigation, drinking and industrial water supply. The endangered turtle Chitra indica and the threatened snake Python molurus ("at lower risk"), as per IUCN Red List, are reported to be resident in the wetland. Considering the wetland's diverse and rich biodiversity, Ramsar Convention has included Ropar Wetland (listed as Ropar Lake) as one of the Ramsar sites among the 42 sites listed under India, for "the conservation of global biological diversity and for sustaining human life through the ecological and hydrological functions they perform."

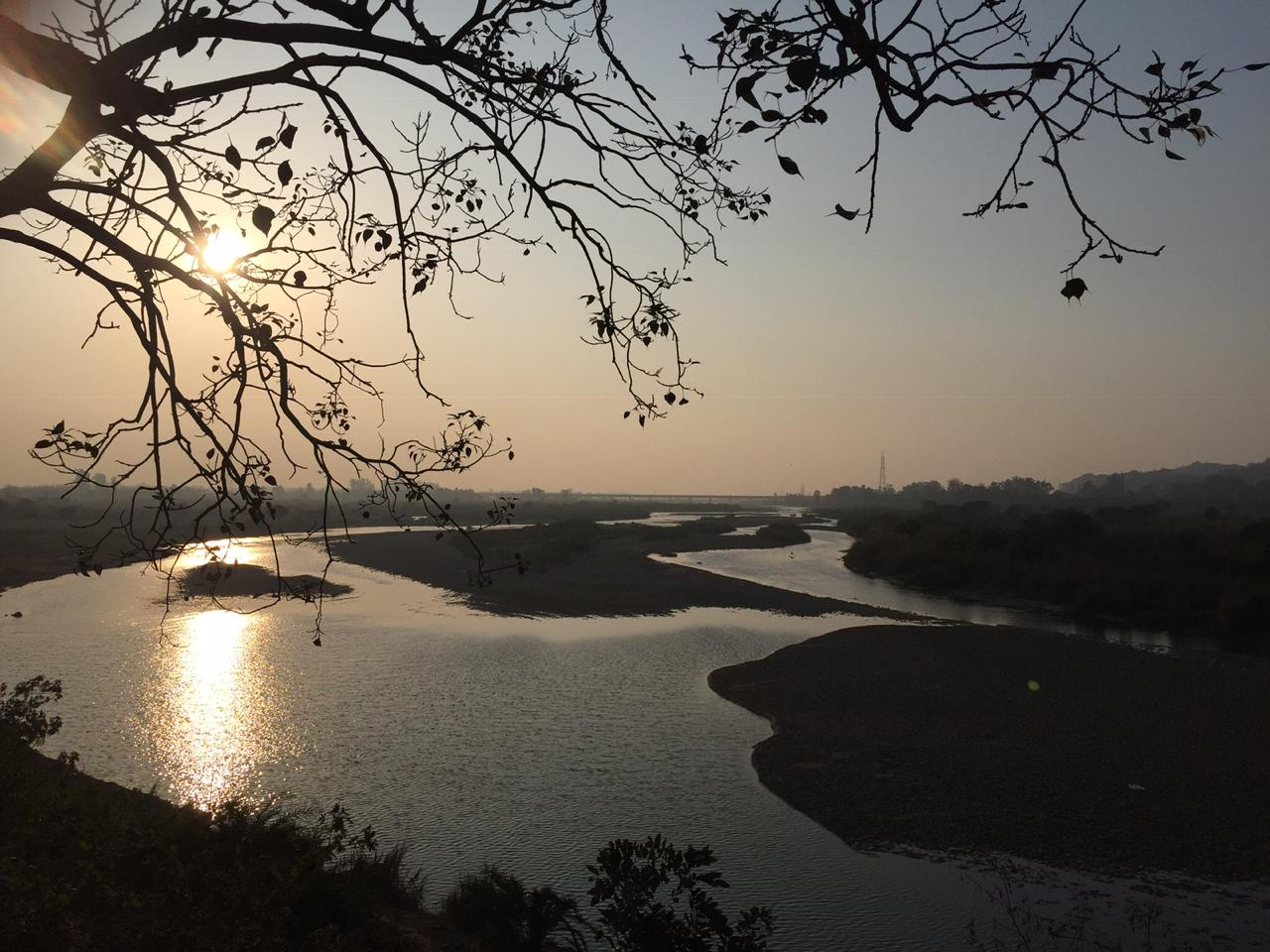
Ropar Wetland

The wetland once was a popular tourist attraction for bird watching and boating. A tourism complex called the ‘Pinccasia’ was located within the wetland boundary, which was run by the Punjab Tourism Development Corporation. A boat club was also functioning. Now only a dilapidated building of tourist bungalow exists, boating Bay is damaged, garden is also unkept. The road leading to Katli fish farm once displayed typical ecological succession with Marsilea growing on the banks of lake along with Equisetum sp.(Horsetails) growing through large rock boulders on the bank. Typha grew further away from lake going across the narrow road with Ferns growing ultimately leading to shrubs during early 1990s. Now only shrubs and trees can be seen.

== Access ==
The wetland is located close to the city of Rupnagar, 45 km northwest of Chandigarh City, in Rubnagar and Shaheed Bhagat Singh Nagar districts of Punjab. Chandigarh is the nearest airport, which connects it to the rest of India.

== History ==
An archaeological museum of the Archaeological Survey of India at Ropar has displays of the antiquities unearthed during the excavations of mound in the area along with photographs displaying excavation material. The Museum depicts a sequence of six cultural periods or phases, with some breaks from Harappan times to the present day, found in the 21-metre-high (69 ft) ancient mound known as Nalagarh Tibbi overlaying the Shiwalik (also spelt Sivalik) deposition on the left bank of the Satluj River where it emerges into the plains. A deep well with a stone inscription of Emperor Shah Jahan (AD 1627-1658) has been located at the foot of the mound. The excavations have established that advanced civilization similar to the Harappa and Mohenjodaro Civilization prospered in Ropar town, an integral part of the wetland.

=== Anglo - Sikh treaty ===
The wetland area has also a modern history in respect of Anglo - Sikh relations. On 26 October 1831, sitting under the shade of an old ficus tree on the bank of Sutlej River, Maharaja Ranjit Singh and Lord William Bentinck, the British Governor General signed an agreement defining the Anglo - Sikh relations and territories.

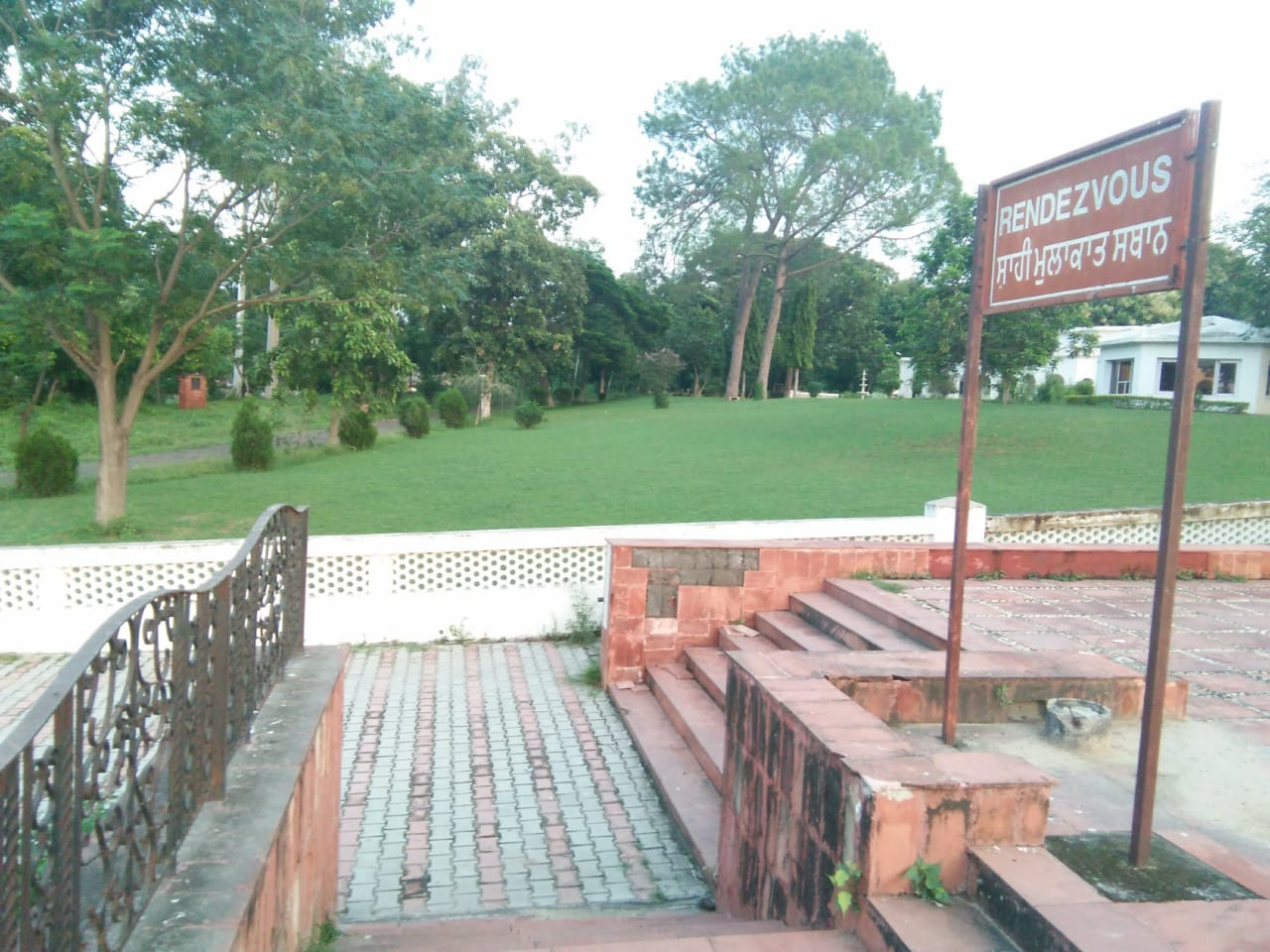
Shahi Mulakaat Sthan Maharaja Ranjit Singh Runagar

== Topography ==
The total area covered by the Wetland is 1365 ha, which includes 800 ha area of the river and the reservoir, 30 ha of forest area named as Sadavarat Forest and 30 ha under marshy plants. The wetland is surrounded by hills in the North West and by plain area in the South and South East. Agricultural crops such as wheat, rice, sugarcane, sorghum etc., are grown in the farm lands in the area surrounding the wetland but the hills have thin vegetation and are exposed to intensive grazing.

== Hydrology ==
Climatically, the drainage area of the wetland falls under semi-arid zone of Punjab with mean annual rainfall of 1518 mm. Initially, in the year 1882, a small headwork was constructed on the right bank of Sutlej River, near Ropar town, to supply water to Sirhind Canal. Subsequently, in 1952, a head regulator was constructed to divert water not only to the Bist Doab Canal but also to Sirhind Canal and to the Bhakra Main Canal (upstream of the wetland), for irrigation, industrial and domestic use.

== Water quality ==
Water quality that determines the health of ecosystem of the wetland was monitored by the Punjab Pollution Control Board (PPCB) in the year 1998-99. The water quality was reported to be of 'A' category as the river entered into Punjab and deteriorated to 'D' category downstream of Ropar Lake, mainly due to the industrial effluents from a number of factories and industrial units. Further studies on physico-chemical analysis of important parameters, biological estimations as well as pesticide residue analysis have been initiated.

== Flora and fauna ==
The wetland is rich in flora and fauna which are categorized below.

=== Flora ===
A total of 19 species of trees and 14 species of bushes and grasses are recorded. Of these, the tree species are Acacia catechu, Ameles modesta, Acacia nilotica, Albizzia lebbek Azadirachta indica, Bombax ceiba, Cassia fistula, Dalbergia sissoo, Eucalyptus tereticornis, Ficus benghalensis, Ficus religiosa, Mangifera indica, Melia azedarach, Moringa oleifera, Morus indica, Prosopis juliflora, Salix (willow), Syzygium cumini (jambul) and Ziziphus jujuba.

=== Aquafauna ===
Wetland is a major source of fisheries since large species of fishes have been recorded; some of the commercially important ones are: Rohu; Labeo gonius Seerha; Labeo calbasu Kalbans or Dhai; Labeo dero Gid; Labeo dyocheilus (Kunni); Catla catla Thal; Cirrhinus mrigala Mori; Puntius sarana Puthi; Cyprinus carpio communis (common carp); Cyprinus carpio spacularis (Mirror carp); Ceenopharyngodon idelle (grass carp); wallago attu Mali; Aorichthys seenghala Sangarha; Mastacembelus armatus Sam (Tire track eel); Ambasis ranga Shisha Mach; Channa punctatus Dolla (snake headed fish); and Channa striata Curd.

Gour species of frogs have been noted.

=== Avifauna ===
Several species of birds have been recorded including 49 local birds, 11 migratory birds, 3 rare birds and 54 common birds. Some of the rare migratory birds are: golden-backed woodpecker (Dinopium benghalense, crimson-breasted barbet (Megalaima haemacephala) and green barbet (Stactolaema olivacea).

=== Fauna ===
Two species of tortoise (Geoclemys hamiltonii and Chitra indica both endangered), five species of lizards, eleven species of snakes including the threatened Python molurus or Indian python or ajgar are found in the wetland.

== Food chain ==
The food chain in the wetland is basically well balanced as it has both deep water and shallow water characteristics and the ecosystem is stated to be

almost self sufficient and self-regulating.

A Scientific study of the food chain has brought out the following sequence of facts.

- Sunlight, pH, inorganic salts, nutrients and dissolved gases are the main abiotic components of the wetland ecosystems with the organic matter caused by the death and decay of animals and plants accumulating at the bottom of the lake
- Decomposition at the bottom of the lake takes place due to a variety of heterotrophic microbes such as bacteria, actinomycetes and fungi; Aspergillus sp., Rhizopus sp., Curvularia sp., Paecilomyces sp., Saprolegnia sp. etc. are main species causing the decomposition
- The producers of organic matter are the eutrophic green plants and some photosynthetic bacteria; the rooted submerged, floating and emergent hydrophytes being the Typha sp., Eleocharis sp., Sagittaria sp., Nymphaea sp., Potamogeton sp., Vallisneria sp., Eichhornia sp., Lemna sp. etc. and minute, floating or suspended lower plants like filamentous algae, diatoms, chlorococcales and flagellates.
- Herbivores such as the mollusks, crustaceans, rotifers and some insects are the primary consumers which feed directly on plants.
- Plant remains and organic matter nourish detritivores like the Chironomidae sp., mollusks, mites, some crustaceans and small fishes
- Marginal rooted macrophytes are consumed by mammals such as buffaloes, cows etc. which frequent the shores of the lake
- Hydrophytes are also the food source of some birds
- Carnivores like the Predator beetles and bugs, dragonflies are the secondary consumers which feed on insects, mollusks, rotifers and crustaceans. Carnivorous fishes also belong to this category
- Large carnivorous fishes and birds are the tertiary consumers which feed on small fishes and insects.
- Top most consumer level is that of the human being and the fish eating birds, which feed mainly on fishes

== Adverse impacts on the wetland ==
Over the years several adverse impacts on the quality of the wetland have been reported. Some of the important ones which invited remedial actions are:

- Acute problems of siltation from the adjoining barren and fragile hills. Bare hills of the catchment are subject to continuous erosion leading to shrinkage of wetland area.
- Unwarranted interference with the resident and migratory birds
- Unauthorized fishing and poaching of wildlife causing damage to species
- Increase in effluents from industrializatation in the upstream area of the wetland, such as the Fertilizer plant at Nangal and Thermal Power Plant at Ropar
- Effluents of chemical pollutants like agrochemical residues run off, industrial effluents and sewage from some towns in the upper reaches of the wetland
- Growth of Invasive weeds

== Restoration measures ==
The Punjab State Council for Science & Technology has evolved several conservation programmes with support from the Ministry of Environment and Forests (MoE&F) of the Govt of India. Some of the programmes implemented include mass awareness campaigns and promotion of public participation in the wetland conservation. A few of the measures planned and under various stages of implementation are:

- Afforestation and soil conservation in the highly erosion prone catchment areas of the wetland,
- To erect chain-link fencing of strategic areas of the wetland to prevent exploitation of vital wetland resources and prevent encroachments of the wetland
- detailed survey, including remote sensing survey and preparation of comprehensive maps
- Detailed taxonomic studies of plant and animal species
- Introduce fish species sustain fragile relationship between the fish level and the other biotic resources like birds and primary producers and to set up new fish seed farms in addition to refurbish the existing ponds.
- Economic assessment

== Gallery ==
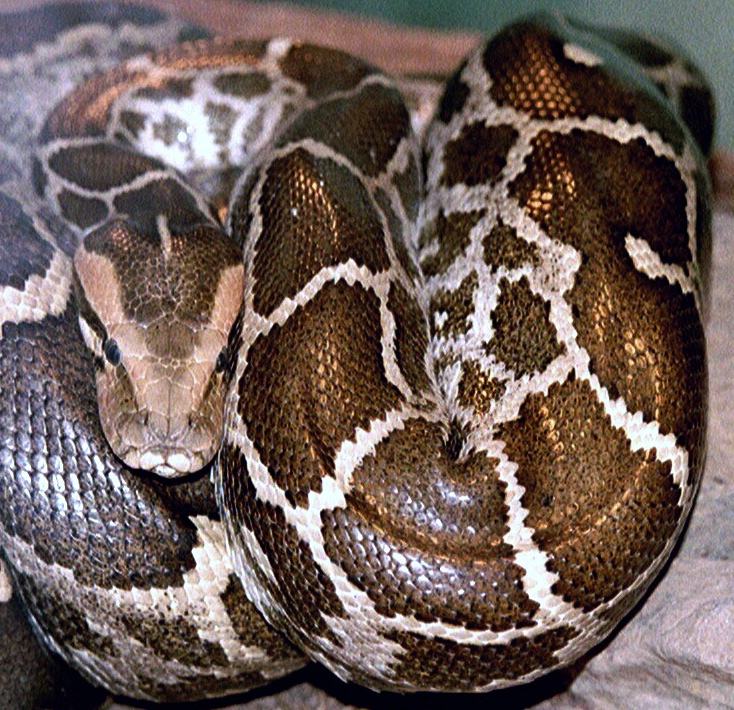
Indian python (Python molurus molurus, Near threatened species)

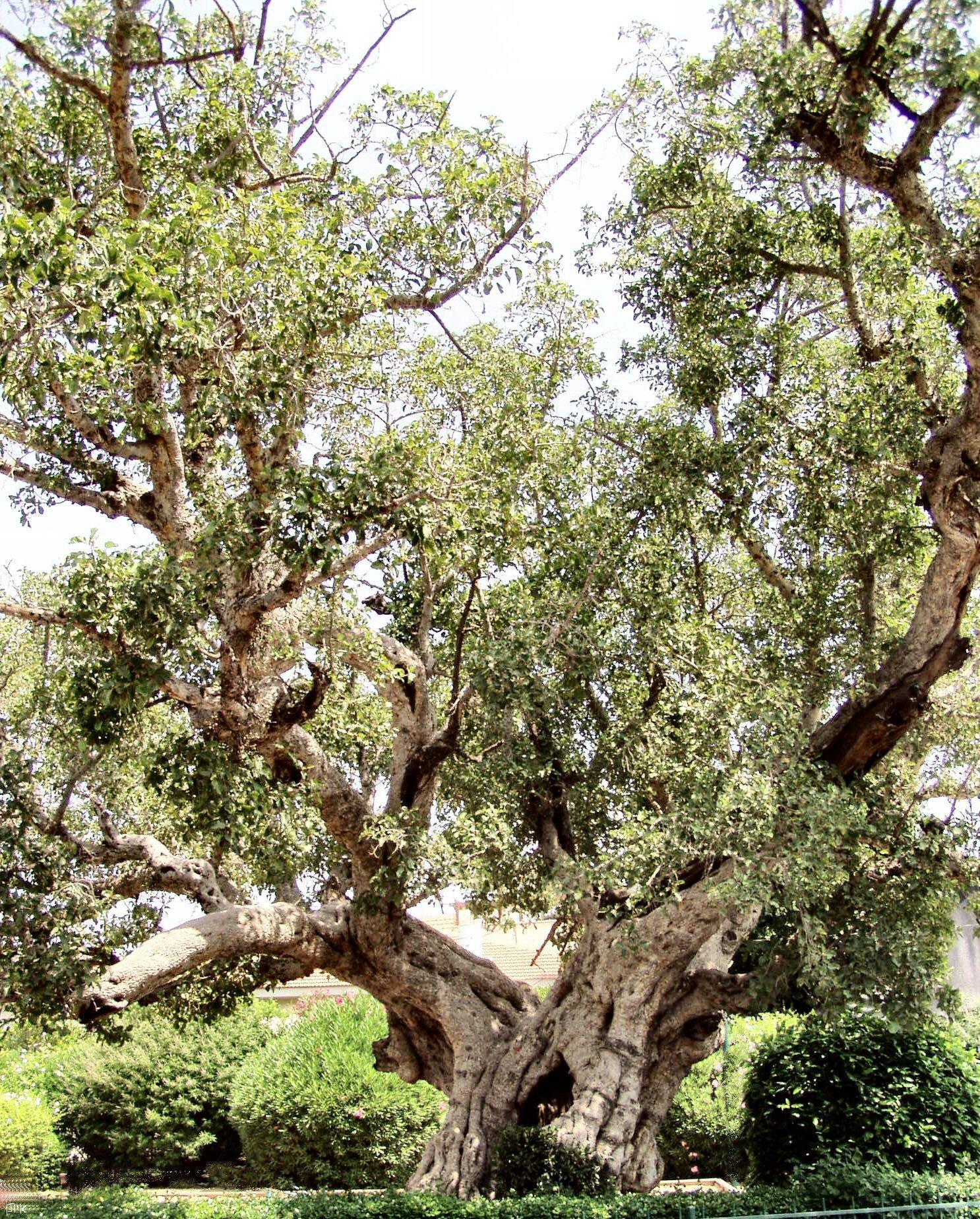
Ficus tree or fig tree

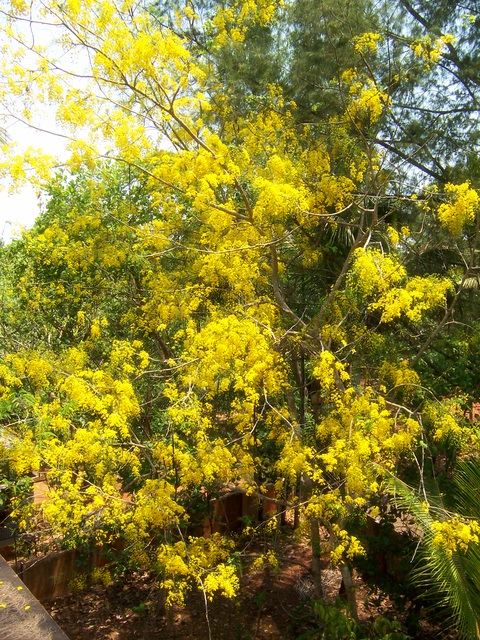
Golden Shower Tree (Cassia fistula)

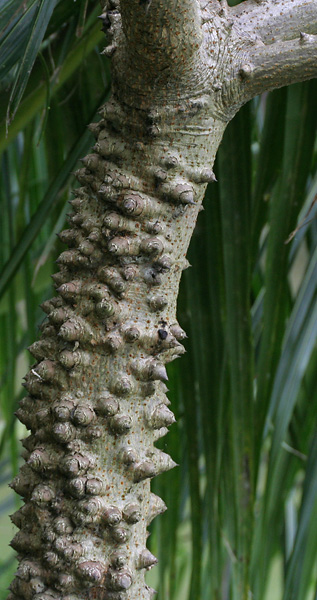
Bombax ceiba (Cotton tree)

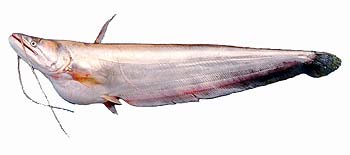
Wallago attu, a species of catfish

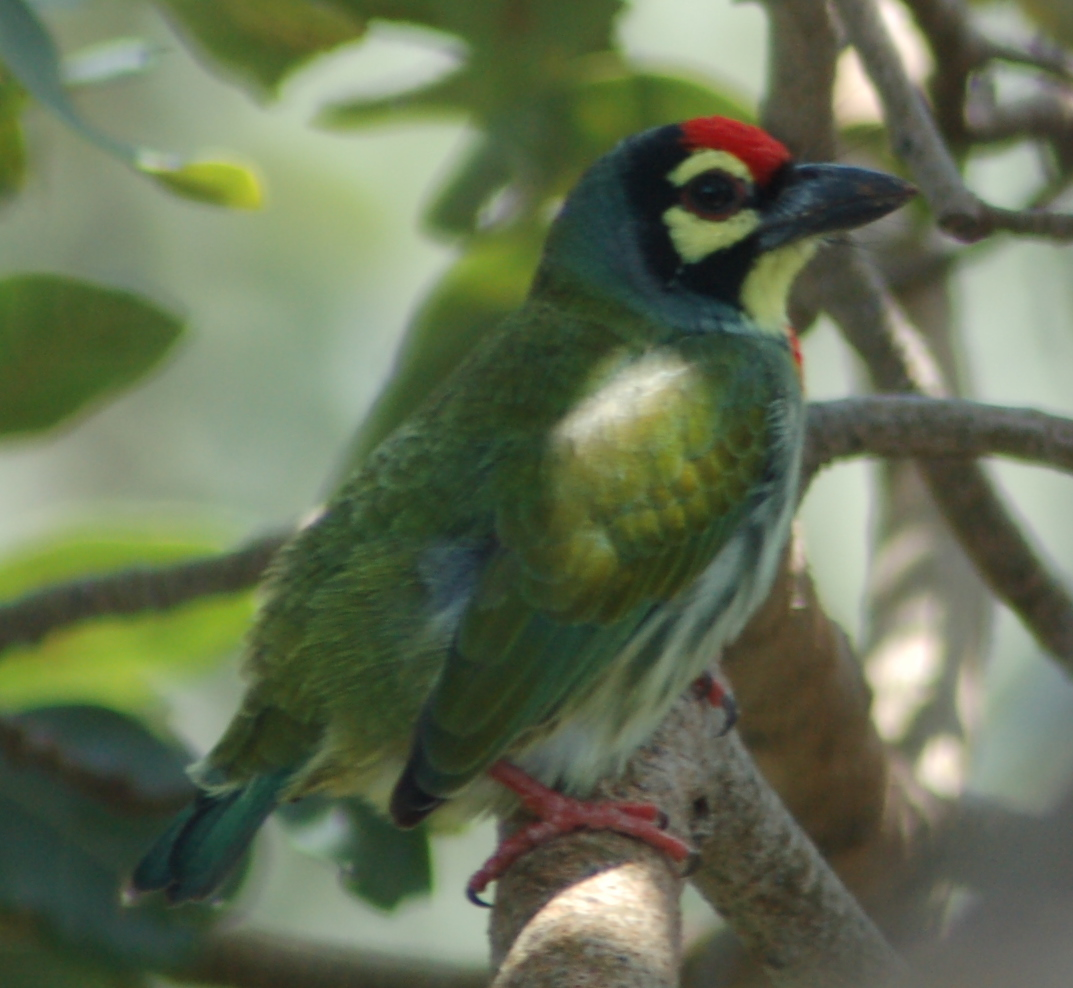
Coppersmith barbet (Megalaima haemacephala)

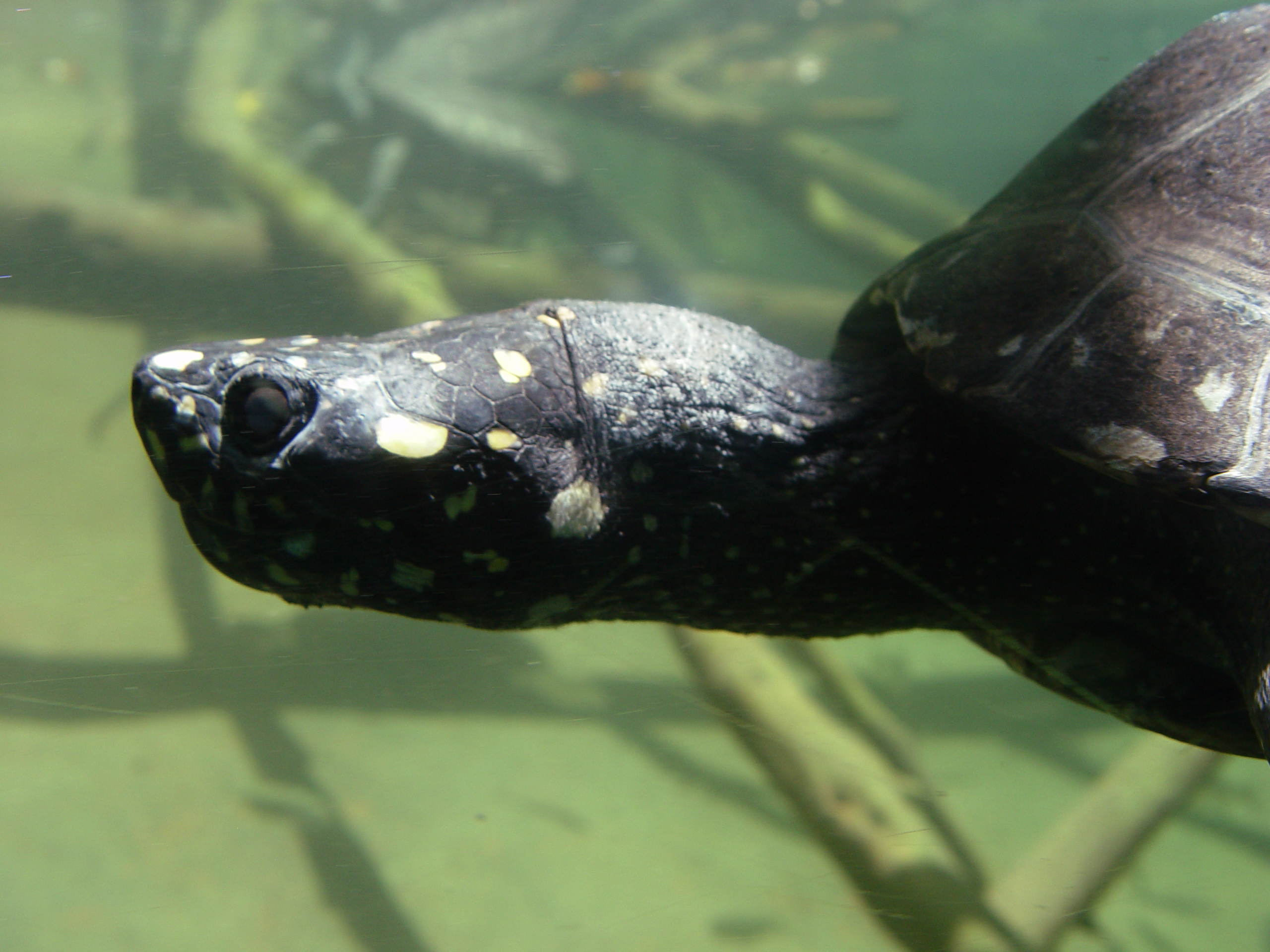
Geoclemys hamiltonii (spotted pond turtle)

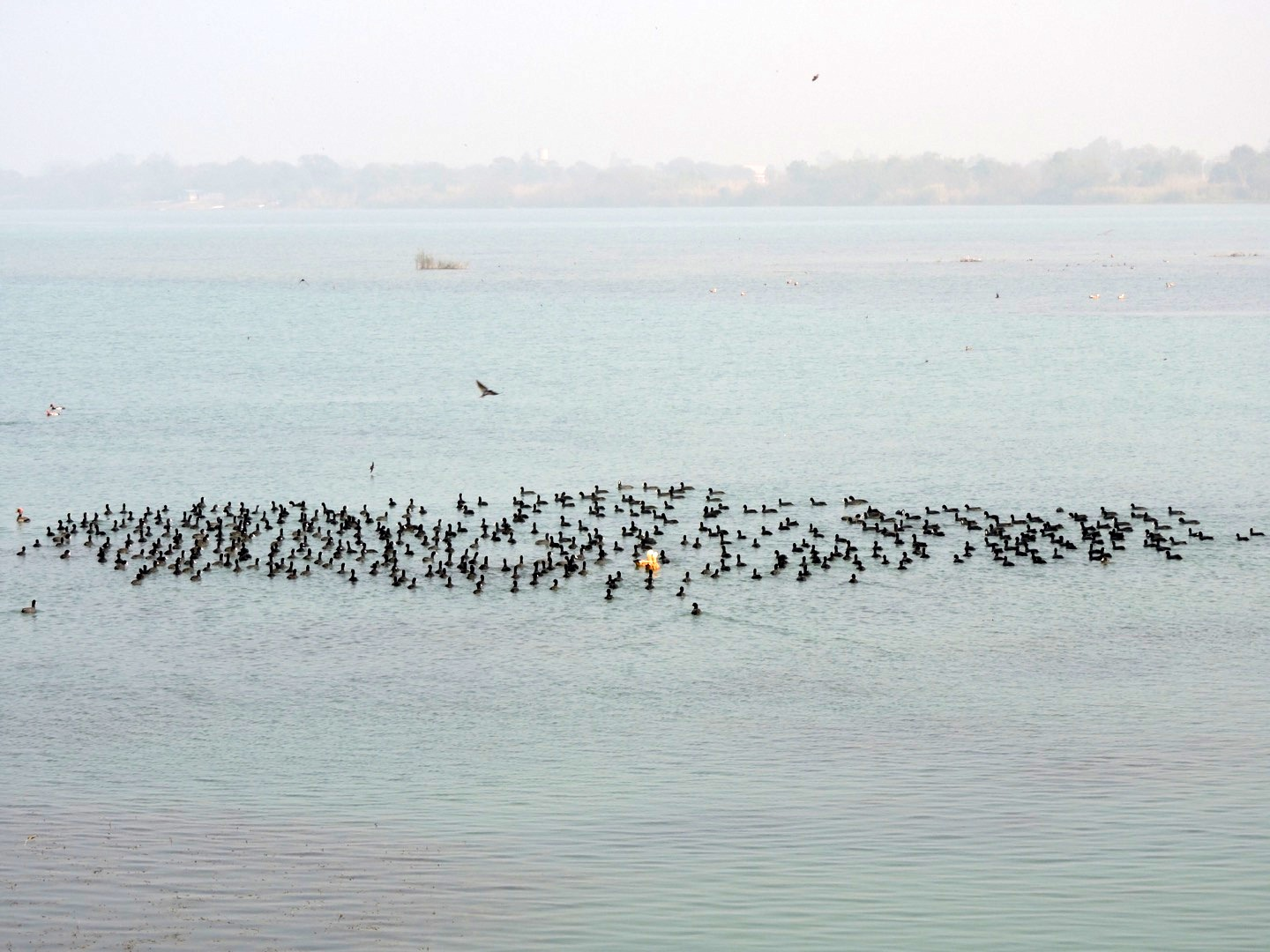
Migratory birds at Ropar Wetland -January 2018

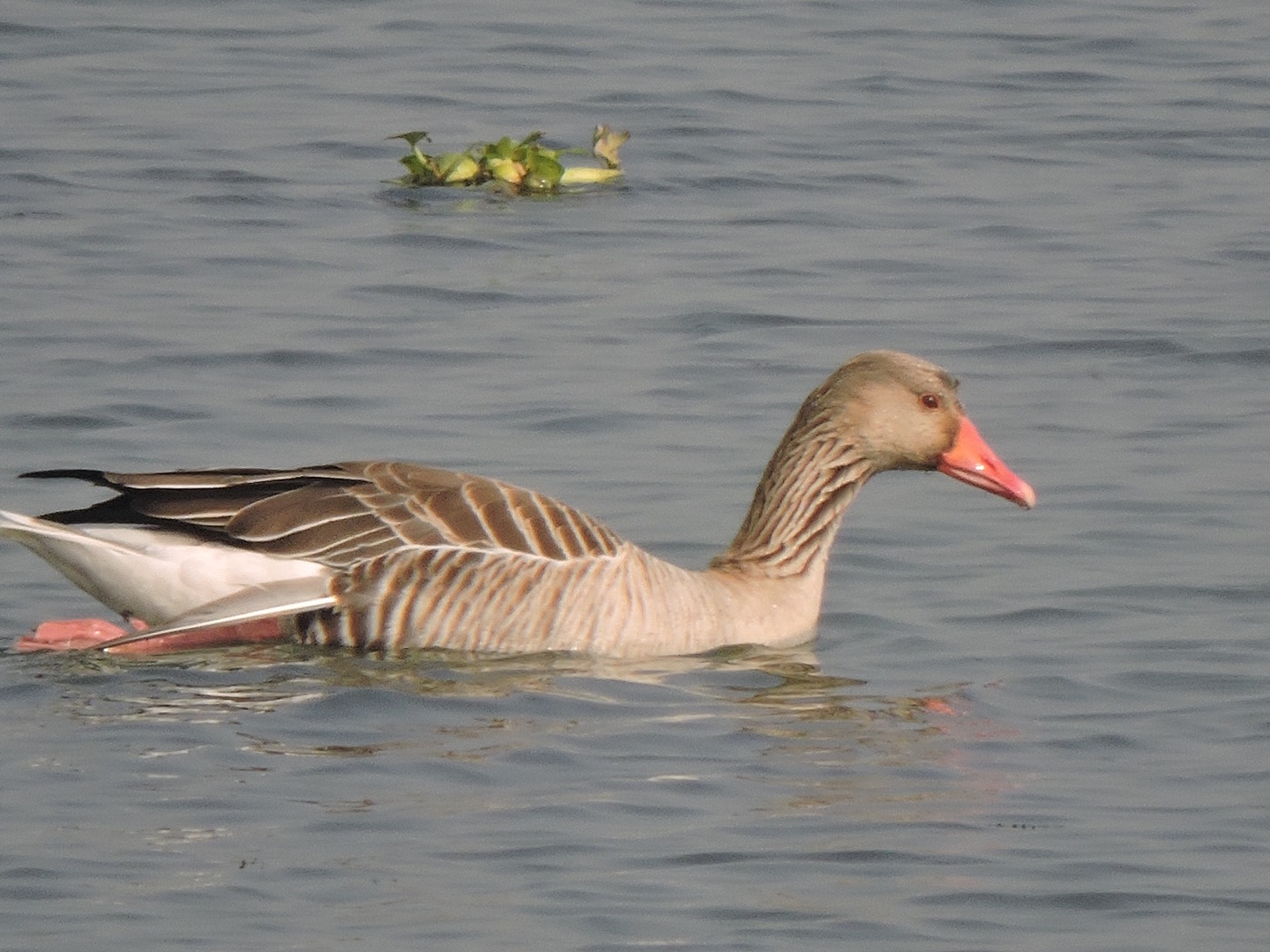
Migratory birds at Ropar Wetland

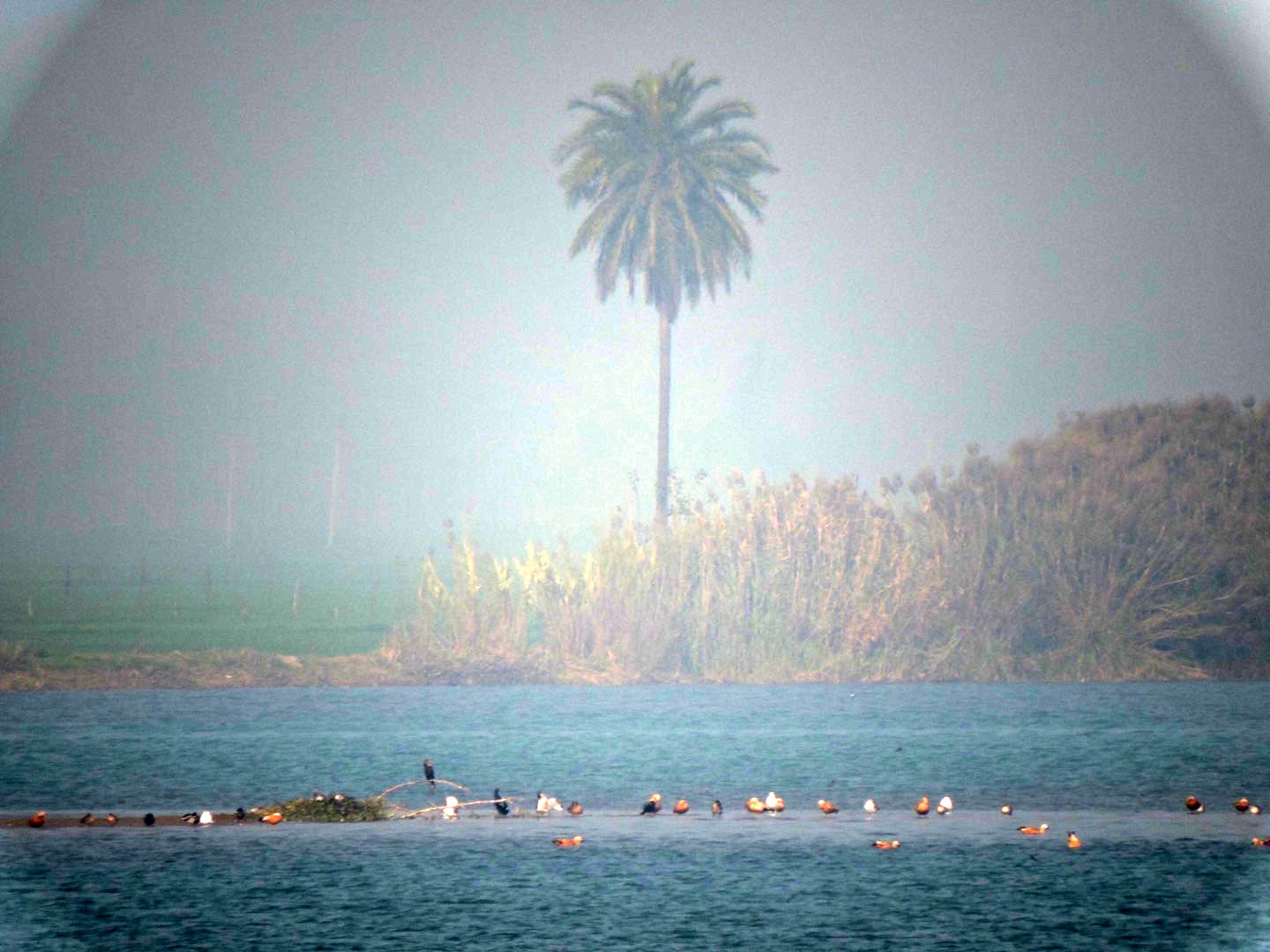
Migratory birds at Ropar Wetland

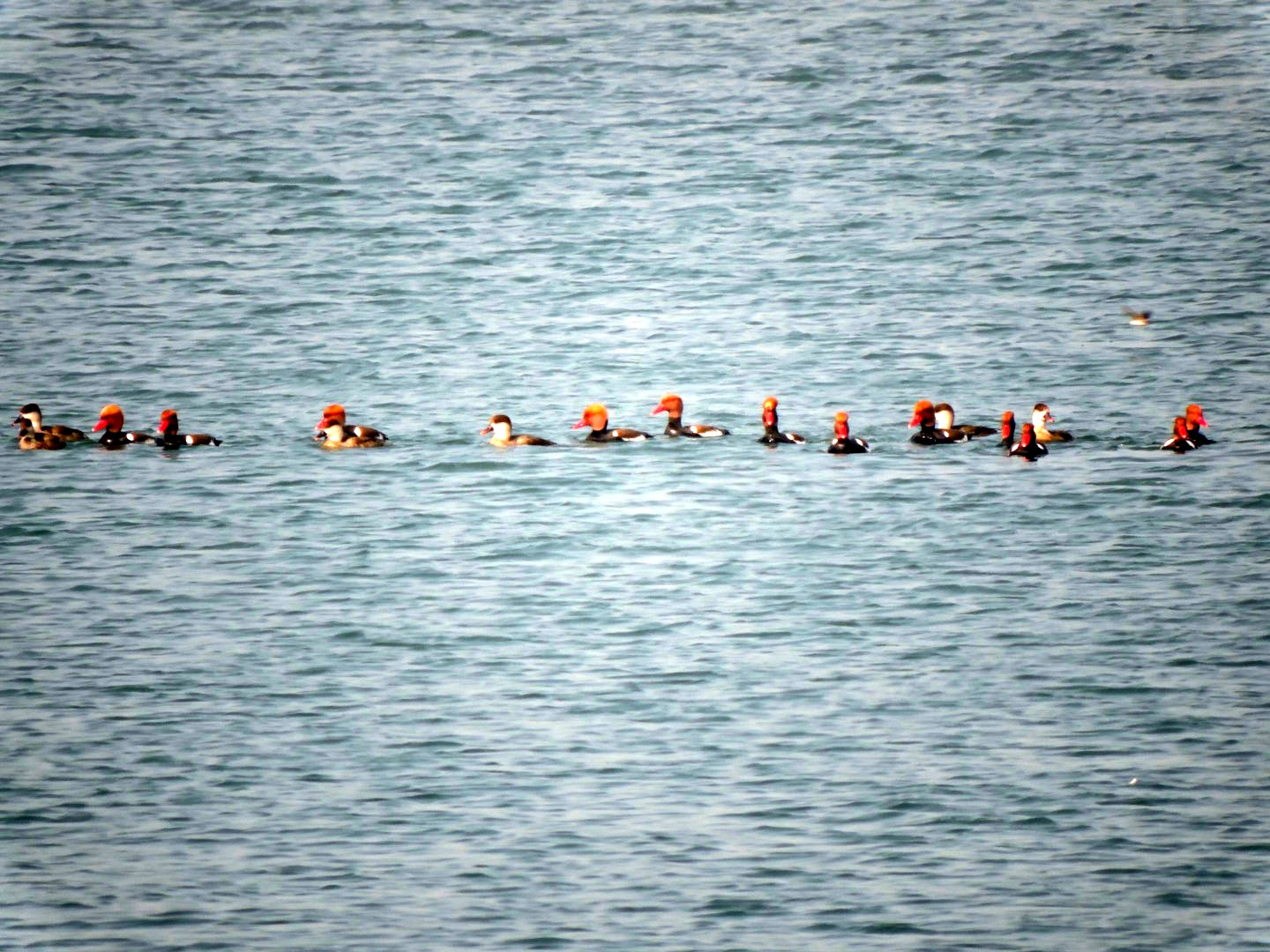
Migratory birds at Ropar Wetland

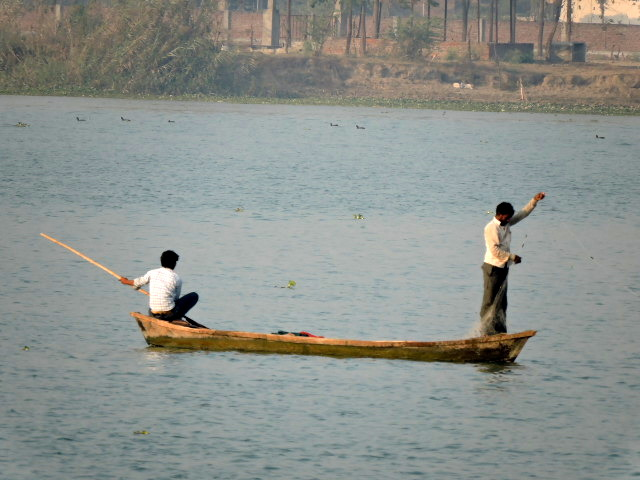
Ropar Wetland -Dec, 2017

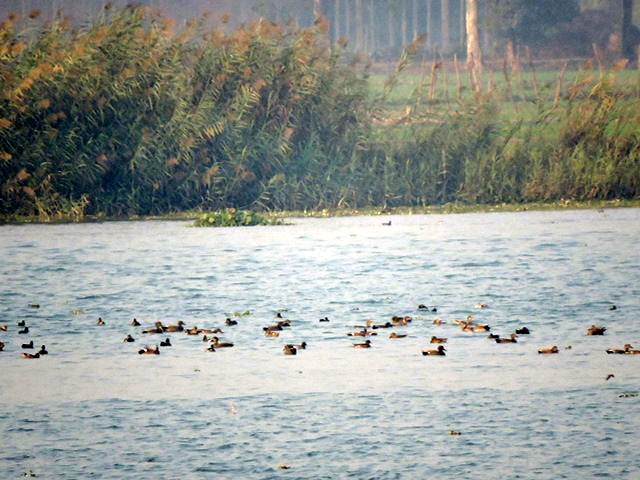
Ropar Wetland - Dec, 2017

== See also ==
- Wetland
- Kanjli Wetland
- Harike Wetland
