= Rupnagar =

Rupnagar Rūpnagar (Punjabi)
- City
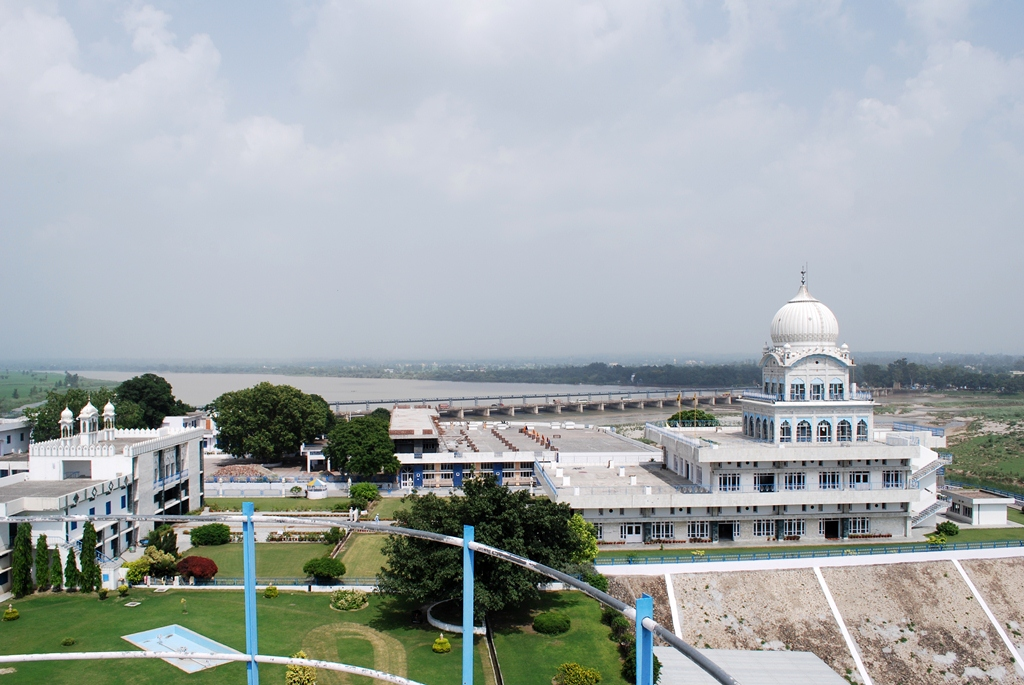
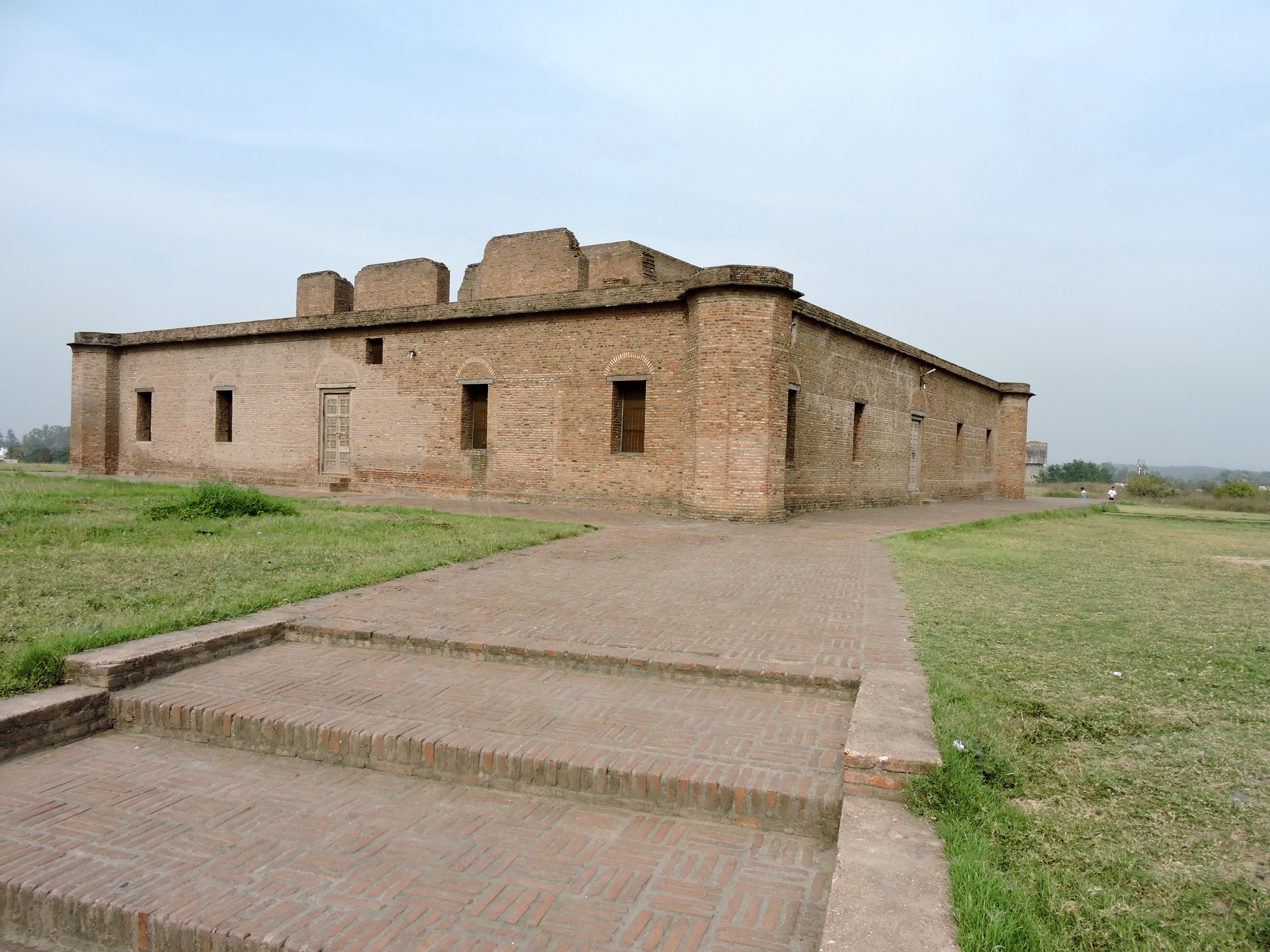
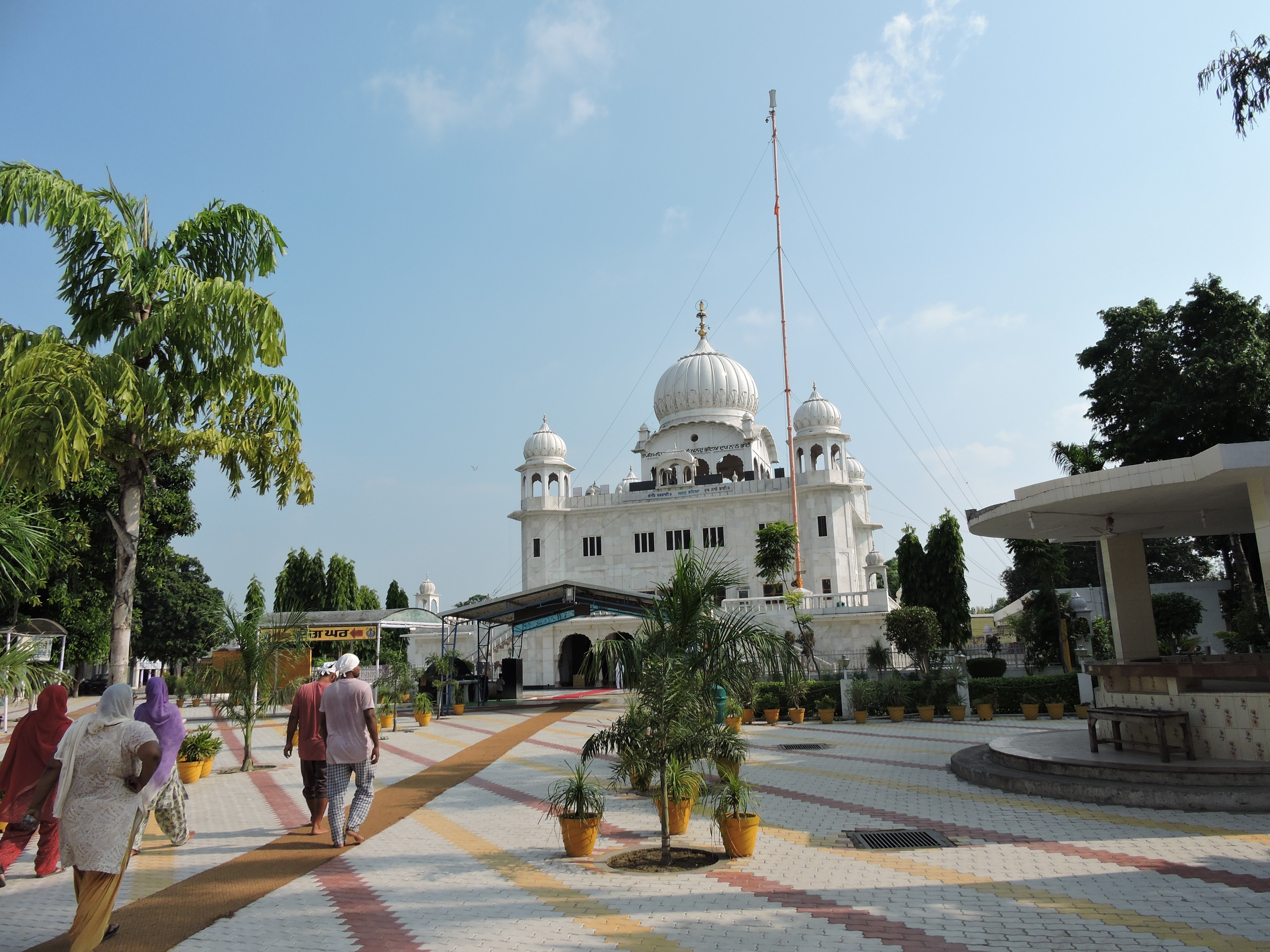
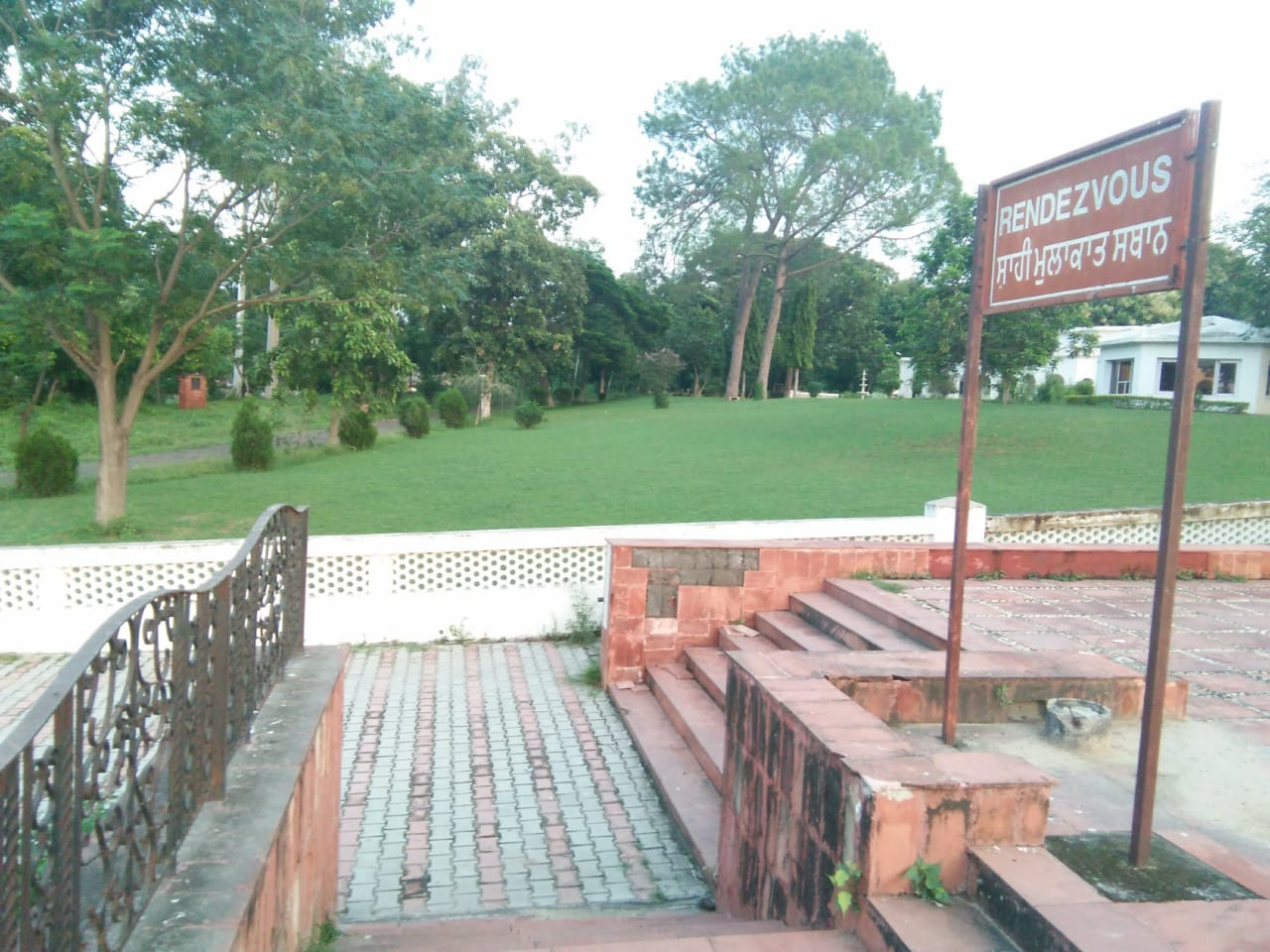
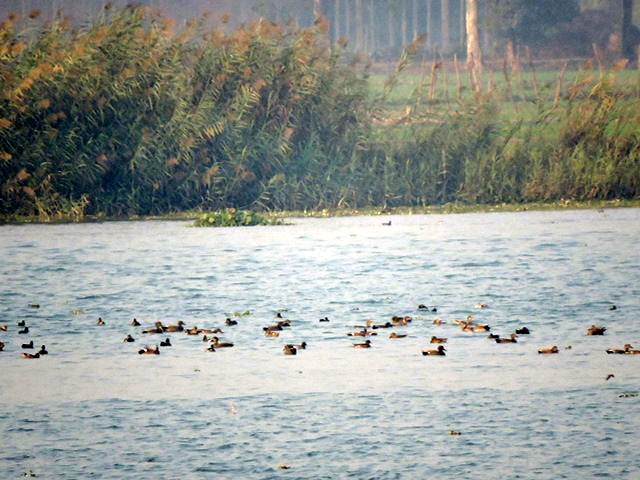
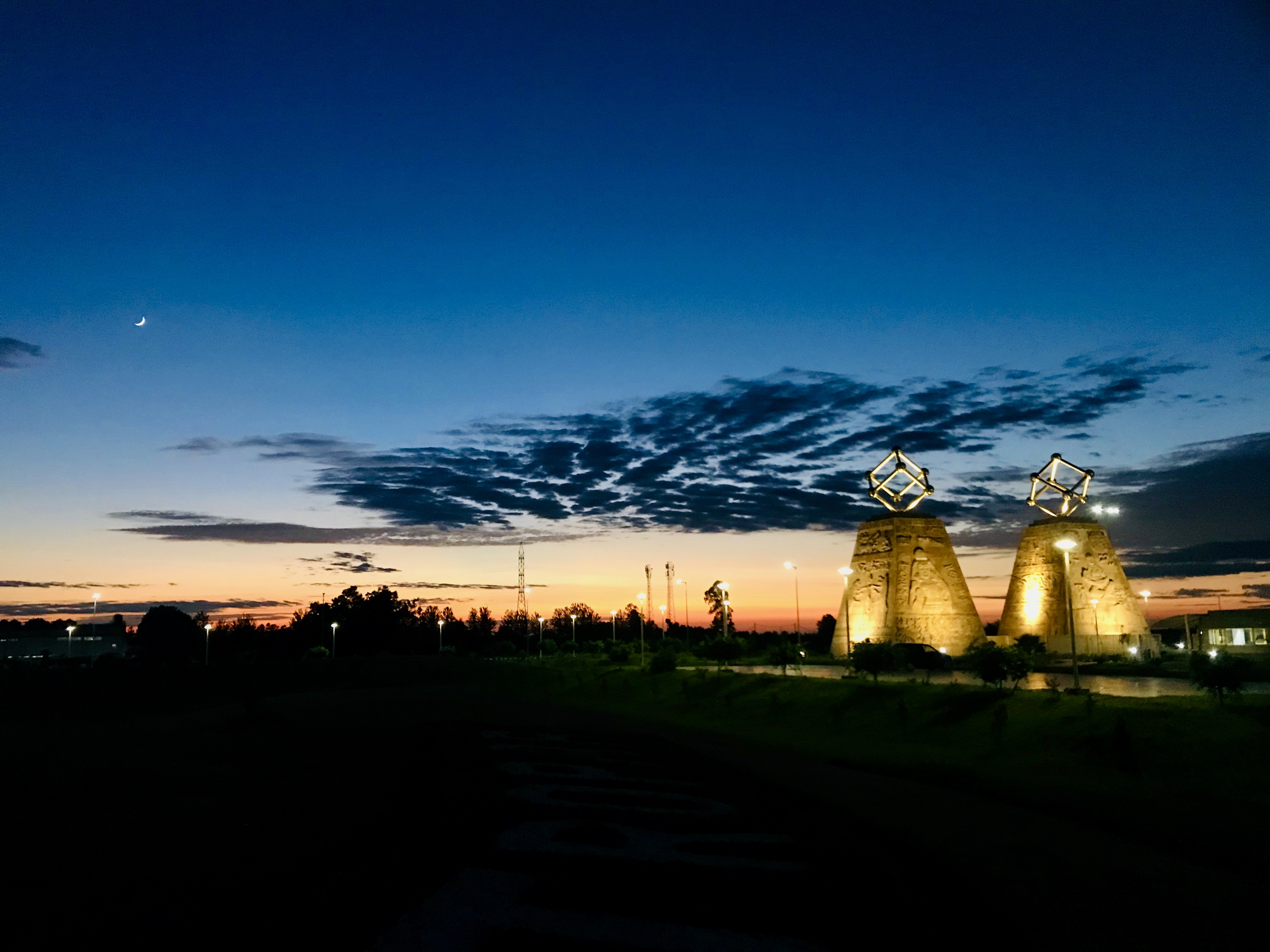
- Gurudwara Tibbi Sahib situated on the banks of Satluj River Indus Valley Civilization (Rupnagar) Gurdwara Bhatha Sahib Maharaja Ranjit Singh Park Ropar Wetland IIT Ropar
- Nickname: Ropar
- Location within Punjab Location within India
- Coordinates: 30°58′00″N 76°31′25″E
- Country: India
- State: Punjab
- District: Rupnagar
- Established: 19th century (2000 BCE)

Government
  - Type: Municipal council
  - Body: Ropar MC

Area
  - Total: 13.65 km^{2} (5.27 sq mi)
- Elevation: 262 m (860 ft)

Population (2011)
  - Total: 56,000
  - Density: 4,100/km^{2} (11,000/sq mi)

Languages
  - Official: Punjabi
  - Native: Puadhi
- Time zone: UTC+5:30 (IST)
- PIN: 140 001
- Telephone code: 91-1881
- Vehicle registration: PB-12
- Website: rupnagar.nic.in

Rupnagar (/ˈrʊpnəɡər/; formerly known as Ropar or Rupar) is a city and a municipal council in Rupnagar district in the Indian state of Punjab. Rupnagar is a newly created fifth Divisional Headquarters of Punjab comprising Rupnagar, Mohali, and its adjoining districts. It is also one of the bigger sites belonging to the Indus Valley civilization. Rupnagar is nearly 47 km (29 mi) to the northwest of Chandigarh (the nearest airport and the capital of Punjab) and nearly 36 kilometres (22 mi) from Baddi- Barotiwala- Nalagarh (BBN) industrial corridor in Solan district of Himachal Pradesh. It is bordered by Himachal Pradesh to the north and Shahid Bhagat Singh Nagar district to its west.

There are many historical and religious places in Rupnagar, including gurdwaras such as Gurdwara Bhatha Sahib, Gurdwara Bhubour Sahib, Gurdwara Solkhian and Gurudwara Tibbi Sahib.

== History ==
=== Etymology ===
The ancient town of Rupnagar is said to have been named by a Raja called Rokeshar, who ruled during the 11th century and named it after his son Rup Sen.

=== Indus Valley civilization ===
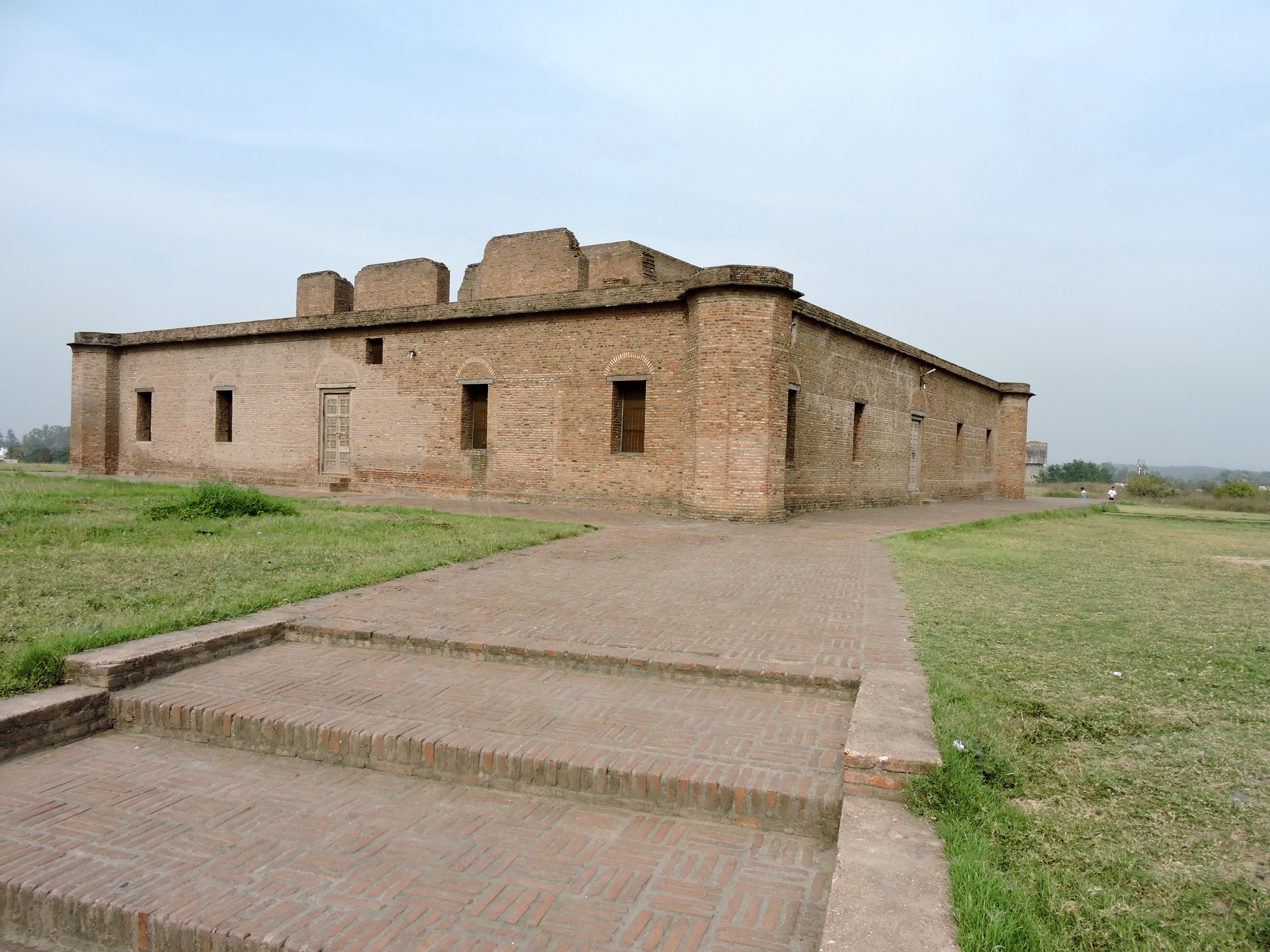
Indus Civilization site, Rupnagar (Ropar), Punjab, India

Rupnagar is one of the Indus Valley civilization sites located along the Ghaggar-Hakra River beds. The site is referenced in sources such as the Encyclopædia Britannica.

The city houses an Archaeological Museum, opened to the public in 1998, which displays artifacts recovered from the excavated site. Rupnagar is notable as the first Harappan site excavated after India's independence.

The excavations reveal a continuous cultural sequence from the Harappan period to medieval times. Important exhibits include Harappan antiquities, gold coins attributed to Chandragupta Maurya, and copper and bronze implements.

== Geography ==
Rupnagar is located at 30.97°N 76.53°E. It has an average elevation of 260 metres (850 ft). The town lies on the bank of Satluj River and the Shivalik hill range spreads along the opposite bank of the river.

=== Climate ===
The climate of Rupnagar is characterized by general dryness (except in the south west monsoon season), a hot summer and a cold winter. The year may be divided into four seasons. The period from about middle of November to February is the cold season. This is followed by the summer season from March to about the end of June. The south-west monsoon season commences late in June and continues up to about middle of September. The period from mid September to the middle of November constitutes the post-monsoon or transition season. The temperature ranges from a minimum of 1 °C (34 °F) in winter to 47 °C (117 °F) in summer. May and June are generally the hottest months and December and January are the coldest months. Relative humidity is high, averaging about 70% during monsoon. The average annual rainfall in the district is 1030mm. About 78% of the annual rainfall is received during June through September.

=== Rupnagar wetland ===
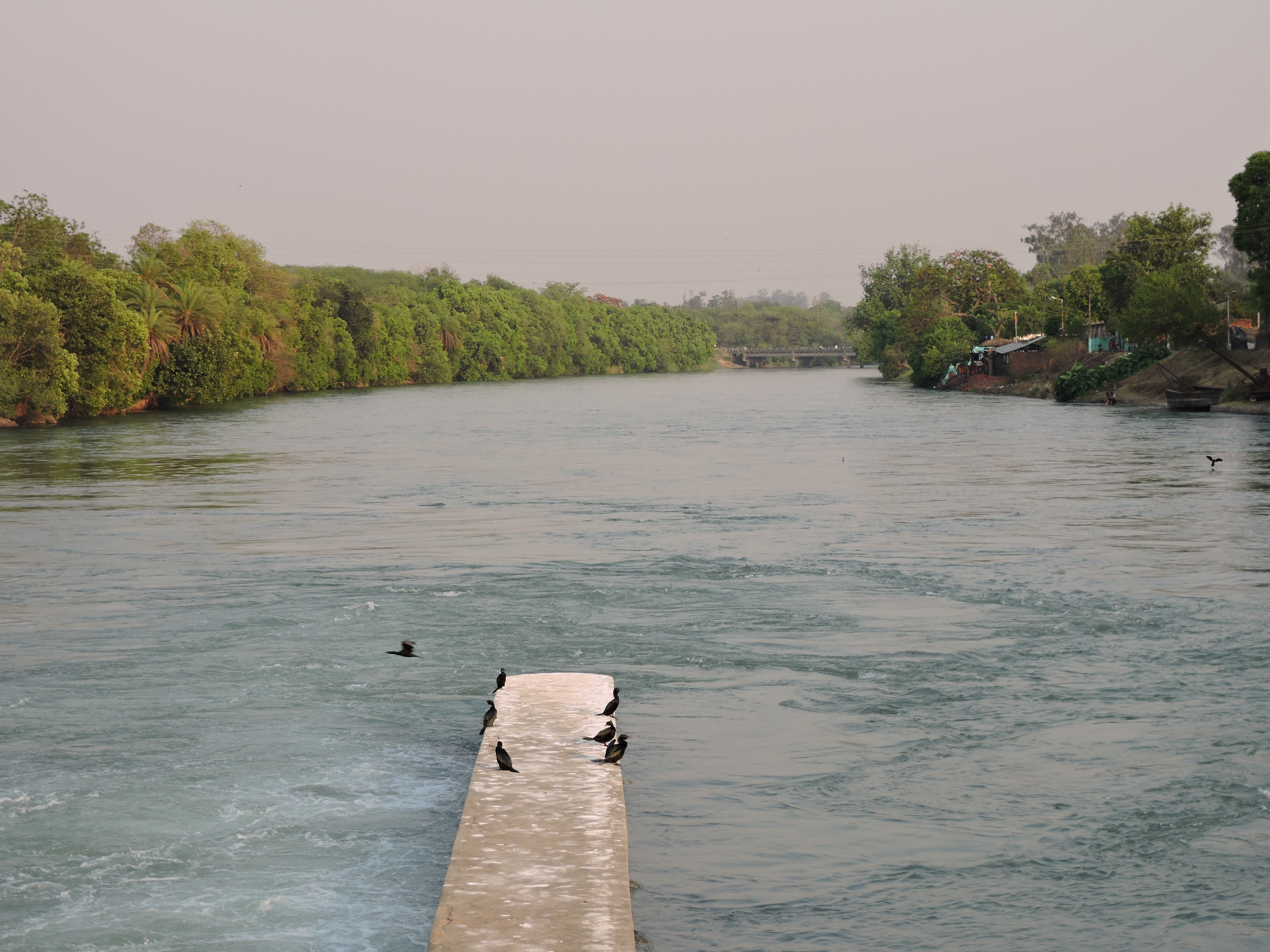
Rupnagar wetland (side outlet), Punjab

The city has one of the three important wetlands of the Punjab State known as Rupnagar Wetland or Ropar Wetland.It was declared as a Ramsar site in 2002 This is a man-made freshwater wetland covering 1,365 hectares. Also called the Rupnagar Lake, the wetland developed consequent to the construction of a regulator on the Sutlej River. The area has a large number of birds, mammals and vegetation. It has at least 9 mammalian, 154 bird, 35 fish, 9 arthropod, 11 rotifer and 10 protozoan species. This important ecological zone is located in the Shivalik foothills of the Lower Himalayas and was created in 1952 on the Sutlej River, in the Punjab state of India, by building a head regulator. The total area of the wetland is 1,365 hectares (3,370 acres). The wetland is surrounded by Shivalik hills to the northwest and by plains to the south and southeast.

== Transport ==
=== Rail ===
Rupnagar railway station falls in the Northern Railway zone of the Indian Railways. It is connected to Chandigarh by a single line railway track. It is also connected to Amritsar via Jalandhar, Ludhiana, Morinda, Una and Nangal Dam.

=== Road ===
Rupnagar city has a road network to surrounding villages and towns in the district as well as to major cities including Una, Baddi, Shimla, Solan, Ludhiana, Jalandhar, Chandigarh and Delhi. Rupnagar is connected by the National Highway system to the following nearby cities, by the following highway routes:

- NH 205 that connects Kharar, Chandigarh, Kurali to Kiratpur Sahib, Bilaspur, Shimla via Rupnagar
- NH 103A connects Hoshiarpur to Rupnagar.
- NH 344A links Rupnagar to Phagwara, Jalandhar via Nawanshahr, Balachaur and Banga via NH103A at Balachaur.

== Demographics ==
As per 2011 India census, Rupnagar had a population of 56,038. Males constitute 52.8% of the population and females 47.2%. Rupnagar has an average literacy rate of 82.19%, higher than the national average of 74.04%: male literacy is 87.50%, and female literacy is 76.42%.

== Companies ==
- Ranbaxy Laboratories

== Education ==
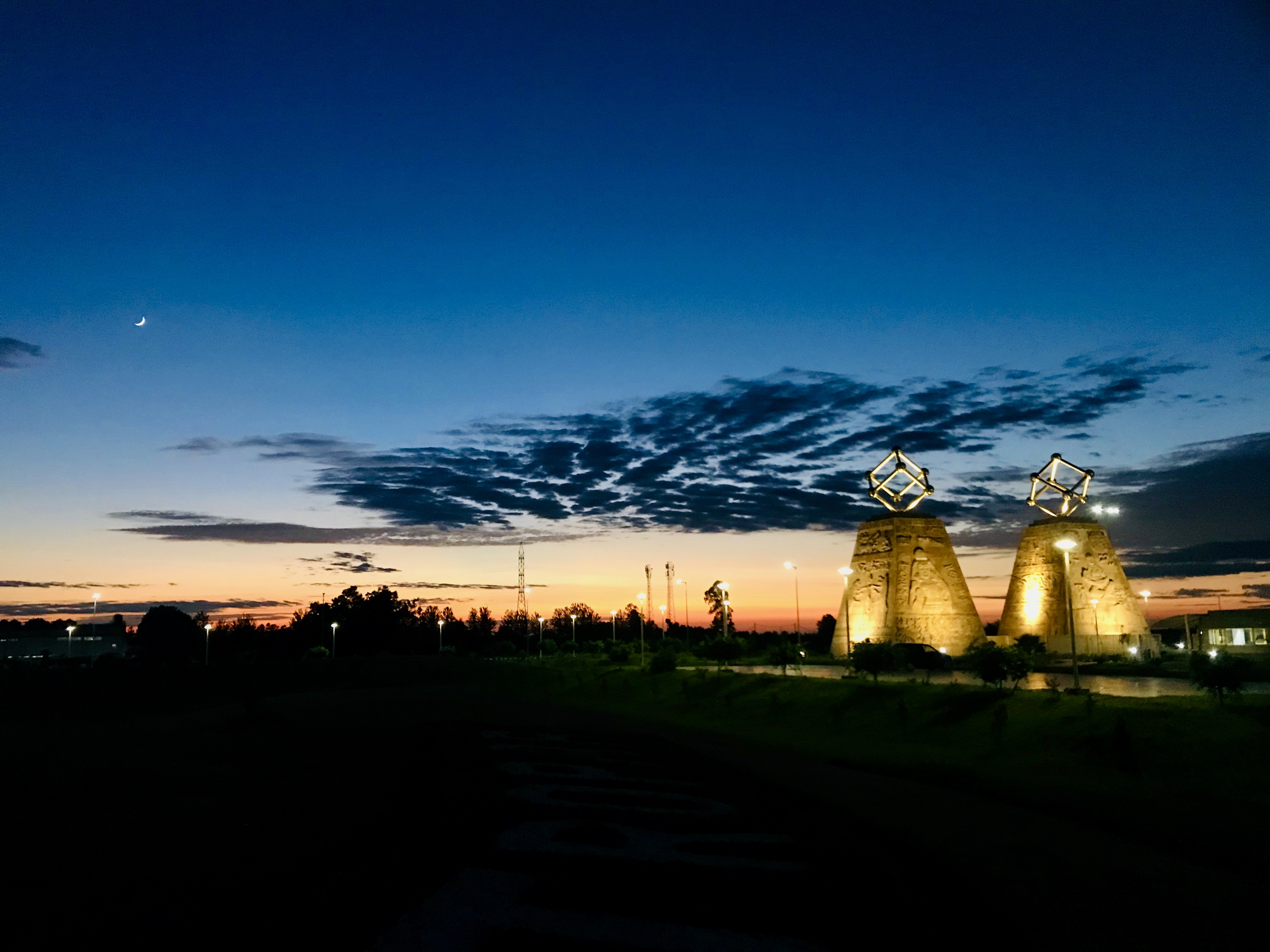
The Indian Institute of Technology, ROPAR.

=== Schools ===
Rupnagar has both public and private schools affiliated with the Central Board of Secondary Education (CBSE), Punjab School Education Board (PSEB), or the Indian Certificate of Secondary Education (ICSE). These schools follow the 10+2 system of education.

=== Higher education ===
Rupnagar houses the Indian Institute of Technology Ropar which is spread over 525 acres in the banks of Satluj, the Institute of Engineering and Technology, Bhaddal, and Government College, Ropar (affiliated to Punjabi University, Patiala).Ropar is an education hub for local villages. Colleges in Ropar offers great opportunities to students from nearby districts too.

== Notable people ==
- Himanshi Khurana, Indian model
- Rattan Chand, Senior bureaucrat for the Government of India
- Manpreet Gony, Indian Cricketer
- Kanshi Ram, Indian politician
- Surjit Bindrakhia, Punjabi singer
- Rana K. P. Singh, Indian politician

== Villages ==
- Assarpur
- [Behrampur Bet]
- [Bela]

== See also ==
- Indus Valley civilization
- List of Indus Valley Civilization sites
- List of inventions and discoveries of the Indus Valley Civilization
- Hydraulic engineering of the Indus Valley Civilization
- Bara, Punjab
- Gaggon
- Sihon Majra
- Rupnagar (disambiguation)
- Ropar (disambiguation)
