= Daulatpur, Himachal Pradesh =

Daulatpur Chowk
- town
- Location in Himachal Pradesh, India Daulatpur Chowk (India)
- Coordinates: 31.8°N 75.98°E
- Country: India
- State: Himachal Pradesh
- District: Una

Government
  - Body: Government of Himachal Pradesh
- Elevation: 521 m (1,709 ft)

Population (2011)
  - Total: 3,765

Languages
  - Official: Hindi
  - Local: Pahadi
- Time zone: UTC+5:30 (IST)
- Postal code: 177204
- Vehicle registration: HP-19AA-

Daulatpur Chowk is a Nagar Panchayat in Tehsil Ghanari of Una district in the state of Himachal Pradesh.

== Geography ==
Daulatpur is located at 31.8°N 75.98°E. It has an average elevation of 521 metres (1709 feet).

== Demographics ==
As of 2011 India census, Daulatpur had a population of 3765. Males constitute 50% of the population and females 50%. Daulatpur has an average literacy rate of 79%, higher than the national average of 74.04%: male literacy is 82% and, female literacy is 76%. In Daulatpur, 11% of the population is under 6 years of age.
