= Northern Railway zone =

Northernmost railway zone of India

Northern Railway

Overview
- Stations operated: 1021
- Headquarters: Baroda House, New Delhi
- Key people: Ashok Kumar Verma (General Manager); Mohit Chandra (Additional General Manager)
- Dates of operation: 14 April 1952; 74 years ago–Present
- Predecessor: Eastern Punjab Railway; Jodhpur State Railway; Bikaner State Railway; East Indian Railway

Technical
- Track gauge: Mixed
- Length: 7,405 km (4,601 mi)
- Track length: 10,702 km (6,650 mi)

Other
- Website: nr.indianrailways.gov.in

The Northern Railway (abbreviated NR) is one of the 18 Railway zones of India and the northernmost zone of the Indian Railways. It is headquartered at Baroda House in New Delhi.

== History ==
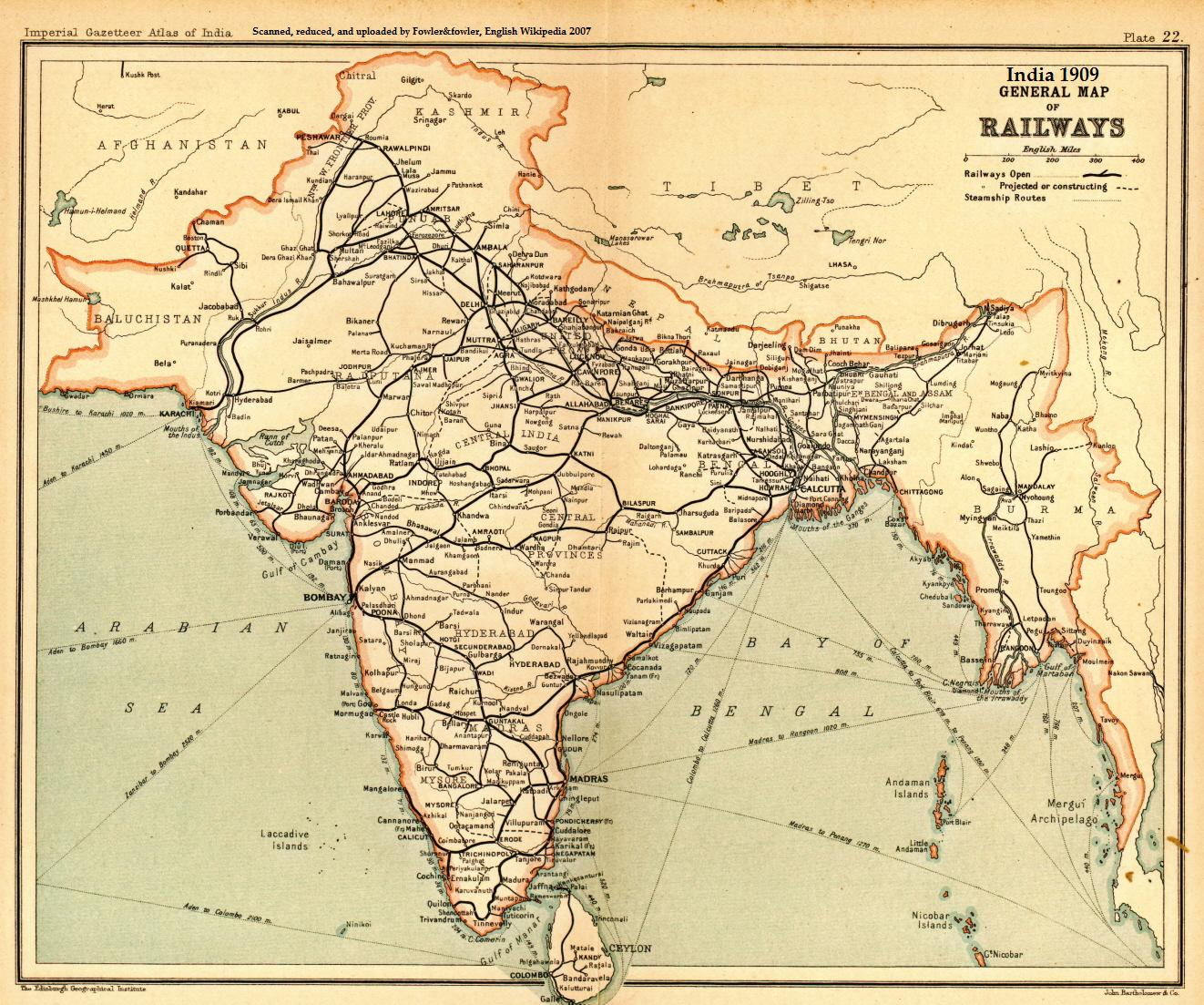
Extent of the Indian railway network in 1909

Officially notified as a new railway zone on 14 April 1952, its origin goes back to 3 March 1859.

On 14 April 1952, the Northern Railway zone was created by merging Jodhpur Railway, Bikaner Railway, Eastern Punjab Railway and three divisions of the East Indian Railway north-west of Mughalsarai (Uttar Pradesh).

On 3 March 1859, Allahabad–Kanpur, the first passenger railway line in North India was opened, which falls under Northern Railway zone.

In 1864, a broad-gauge track from Calcutta to Delhi was laid.

In 1864, the railway line between Old Delhi and Meerut City railway station was constructed. Meerut Cantt railway station was established by British India government around 1865 after the sepoy mutiny of 1857.

In 1866, through trains started running on the East Indian Railway Company's Howrah–Delhi line.

In 1870, the Scinde, Punjab & Delhi Railway completed the 483 km (300 mi)-long Amritsar–Ambala–Jagadhri–Saharanpur–Ghaziabad line connecting Multan (now in Pakistan) with Delhi Junction.

In 1872, Delhi Sarai Rohilla railway station was established when the metre-gauge railway line from Delhi to Jaipur and Ajmer was being laid. It was a small station just outside Delhi as Delhi was confined to walled city then. All the metre-gauge trains starting from (and terminating at) Delhi to Rewari, Punjab, Rajasthan and Gujarat passed through this station. The track from Delhi to Sarai Rohilla was double. The single track from Sarai Rohilla to Rewari was doubled up to Rewari, from where single tracks diverged in five directions.

In 1876, metre-gauge track from Delhi to Rewari and further to Ajmer was laid in 1873 by Rajputana State Railway.

In 1879, the Sind, Punjab and Delhi railway completed the 483-kilometre-long (300 mi) Amritsar–Ambala–Saharanpur–Ghaziabad line connecting Multan (now in Pakistan) with Delhi.

In 1884, the Rajputana–Malwa Railway extended the 1,000 mm (3 ft 3 3/8 in)-wide metre gauge Delhi–Rewari line to Bathinda. The Bathinda–Rewari metre-gauge line was converted to 5 ft 6 in (1,676 mm) broad gauge in 1994.

On 9 March 1885, the first train ran from Jodhpur Junction railway station to Luni. The New Jodhpur Railway was later combined with Bikaner Railway to form Jodhpur–Bikaner Railway in 1889. A Railway line was completed between Jodhpur and Bikaner in 1891. Later in 1900, it combined with Jodhpur–Hyderabad Railway (some part of this railway is in Pakistan) leading to connection with Hyderabad of Sindh Province. Later in 1924 Jodhpur and Bikaner Railways worked as independent Railways. After Independence, a part of Jodhpur Railway went to West Pakistan.

In 1891, the Delhi–Panipat–Ambala–Kalka line was opened.

In 1891, the Delhi–Panipat–Ambala–Kalka line was opened The 610 mm (2 ft)-wide narrow-gauge Kalka–Shimla Railway was constructed by Delhi–Panipat–Ambala–Kalka Railway Company and opened for traffic in 1903. In 1905 the line was regauged to 762 mm (2 ft 6 in)-wide narrow gauge.

In 1897, the Southern Punjab Railway Co. opened the Delhi–Bhatinda–Samasatta line in 1897. The line passed through Muktasar and Fazilka tehsils and provided direct connection through Samma Satta (now in Pakistan) to Karachi.

In 1900, the present building of the Delhi Junction railway station was built with 2 platforms and opened for public in 1903.

In 1900, the Ghaziabad–Moradabad link was established by Oudh and Rohilkhand Railway. In 1901–02, the metre gauge Jodhpur–Bikaner line was extended to Bathinda by Jodhpur–Bikaner Railway. It was subsequently converted to broad gauge.

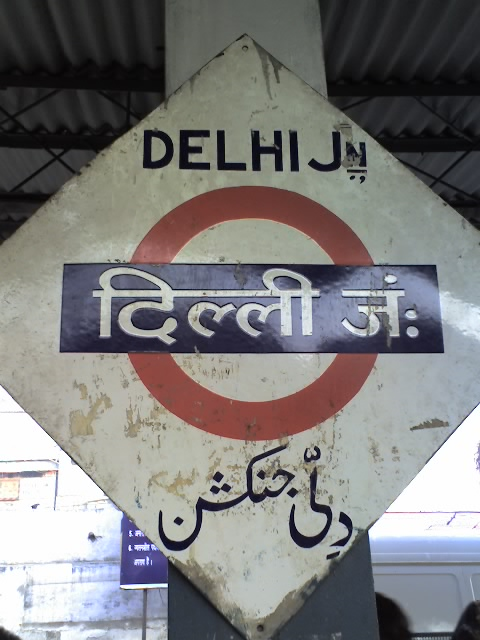
Old Delhi Junction

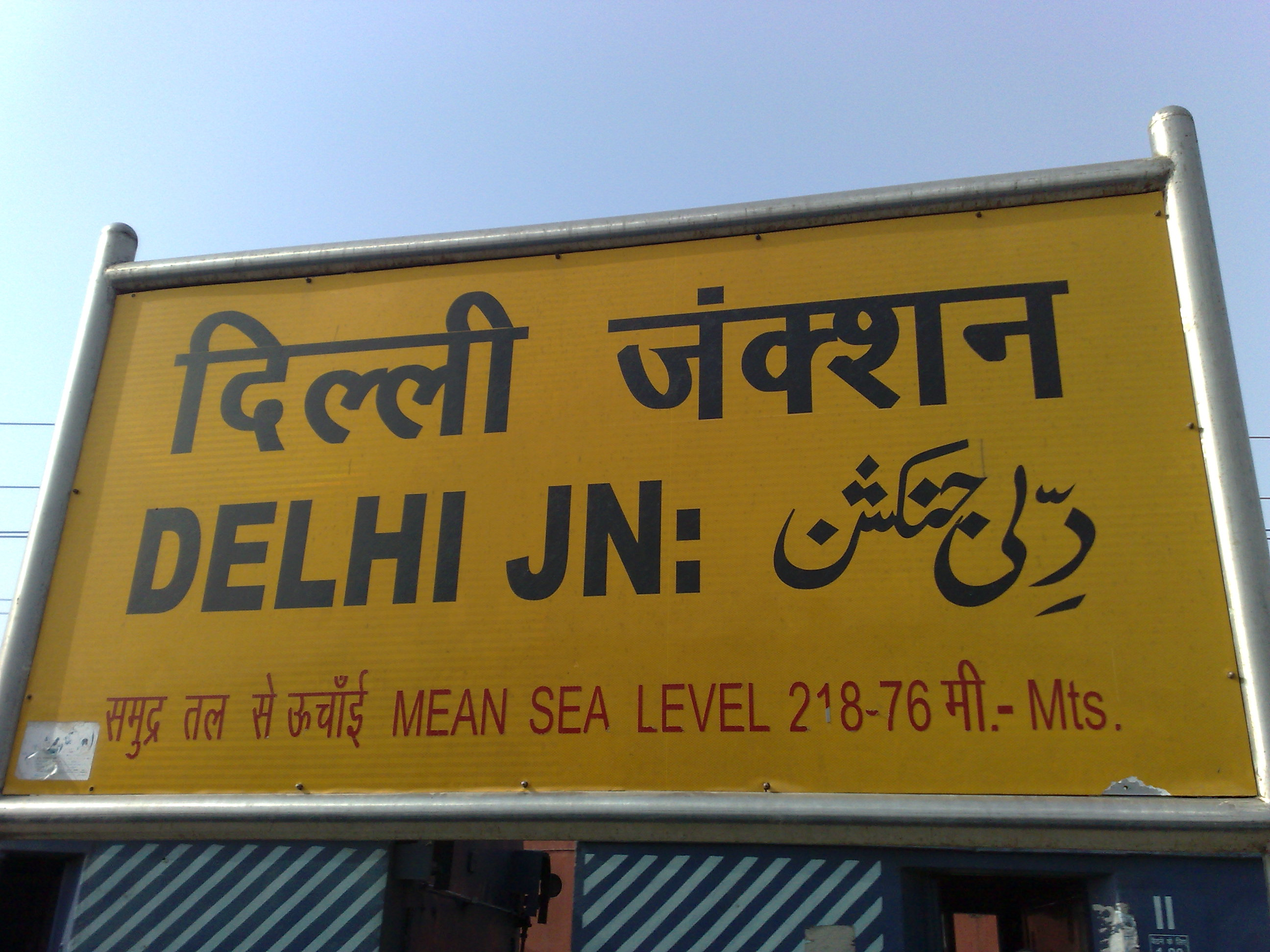
Delhi railway station

In 1904 the Agra–Delhi line was opened. Six railway lines then entered Delhi. East Indian Railway, North-Western Railway, and Oudh and Rohilkhand Railway entered from Ghaziabad crossing the Yamuna river. Delhi–Sonipat Junction railway station–Panipat Junction–Ambala Cantonment Junction–Kalka Railway ran northwards from Delhi, and the Rajputana–Malwa Railway traversed the Delhi district for a short distance in the direction of Gurgaon and Rewari Junction. Delhi Railway Station was built in red stone to give the effect of nearby historic Red Fort. The station building had six clock towers and tower 4 is still in use as a water tank. The station was remodelled in 1934–35, when its platforms were extended and power signals were introduced. A new entrance from Kashmere Gate side was created in 1990s and new platforms were added. The platforms were renumbered in September 2011. The numbers that started from Kashmere Gate entrance as 1A and ended at 18 near the main entrance were renumbered starting as 1 from the main entrance and ending at 16 at Kashmere Gate entrance and some platforms were merged to form long platforms to accommodate trains of 24 coaches. The station building was renovated in 2012–13. Delhi earlier handled both broad and meter gauge trains. Since 1994, it is a purely broad-gauge station, metre-gauge traffic having been shifted to Delhi Sarai Rohilla station.

In 1926, New Delhi railway station opened ahead of the inauguration of the New Delhi as city in 1931. Agra–Delhi railway track cut through the site earmarked for the hexagonal War Memorial (now called India Gate) and Kingsway (now called Rajpath). East Indian Railway Company shifted the line along the Yamuna river and opened the new track in 1924. Before the new imperial capital New Delhi was established after 1911, the Old Delhi railway station served the entire city and the Agra–Delhi railway line cut through what is today called Lutyens' Delhi and the site earmarked for the hexagonal All-India War Memorial (now India Gate) and Kingsway (now Rajpath). The railway line was shifted along Yamuna river and opened in 1924 to make way for the new capital. Minto (now Shivaji) and Hardinge (now Tilak) rail bridges came up for this realigned line. The East Indian Railway Company, that overlooked railways in the region, sanctioned the construction of a single story building and a single platform between Ajmeri Gate and Paharganj in 1926. This was later known as New Delhi Railway station. The government's plans to have the new station built inside the Central Park of Connaught Place was rejected by the Railways as it found the idea impractical. In 1927–28, New Delhi Capital Works project involving construction of 4.79 miles (7.71 km) of new lines was completed. The Viceroy and royal retinue entered the city through the new railway station during the inauguration of New Delhi in 1931. New structures were added to the railway station later and the original building served as the parcel office for many years.

In 1975–76, the Tundla–Aligarh–Ghaziabad track was electrified.

In 1976–77, the Ghaziabad–Nizamuddin–New Delhi–Delhi track was electrified.

On 1 July 1987, Ambala railway division was created by transferring 639 km tracks from Delhi Division and 348 km from Firozpur Division, and it became completely operational from 15 August 1988. 62% its are lies Punjab and the rest in Haryana, Himachal Pradesh, Uttar Pradesh, Rajasthan and Chandigarh. It has 141 stations, including UNESCO World Heritage Kalka Shimla Railway.

In 1992–1995, Sabjimandi–Panipat–Karnal sector was electrified.

In 1994 December, the Delhi–Rewari railway line had double metre-gauge tracks and one of the tracks was converted to broad gauge as a part of conversion of Ajmer–Delhi line. Within a few years, both the tracks from Sarai Rohilla to Delhi railway station were converted to broad gauge and all metre gauge trains stopped operating from Delhi station.

In 1998–99, Ambala–Chandigarh sector was electrified.

In 1999–2000, Chandigarh–Kalka.

In 2003, Anand Vihar Terminal railway station's was announced as new station to be built, foundation stone laid on 25 January 2004. construction commenced in October 2006, and opened on 20 October 2009. The city of Delhi heavily depends on the Rail transport to cater for the increasing load of passengers to their destinations. The long-distance trains from Delhi used to ply from three stations namely Delhi Junction (Old Delhi), New Delhi and Hazrat Nizamuddin railway stations. These stations lacked the infrastructure facilities to handle such high passenger rush. Also, Delhi is the connecting station for the cities in the Northern states Punjab, Haryana, Himachal Pradesh, Uttarakhand and Jammu and Kashmir. With increasing passenger pressure at the existing stations, the requirement of additional major passenger terminals was identified by the Northern Railways. The East-bound trains from Delhi to the states of Uttar Pradesh, Bihar, Orissa, Jharkhand West Bengal and other North-eastern states had to cross the bridge over River Yamuna as all the three stations are located on the other side of the river. Thus, the area of Anand Vihar was selected in the trans-Yamuna region to construct a mega-railway terminal.

In 2010–11 Rail Budget, Panipat–Meerut line 104 km survey was announced and the project implementation was approved in 2017–18 budget with an outlay of ₹948 crore.

In 2013, Chandigarh–Sahnewal line (also referred to as Ludhiana–Chandigarh rail link) was inaugurated.

In 2013, the foundation stone for the shifting of Rohtak–Makrauli section of Rohtak–Gohana–Panipat line was laid.

In May 2013, a tender was awarded to enable free Wi-Fi connectivity at the New Delhi railway station, at an approximate cost of ₹8 million (US$85,000) and service became functional later in the year.

By September 2006, the second metre-gauge track from Sarai Rohilla to Rewari was also converted to broad gauge and all metre-gauge trains stopped operating between Rewari and Sarai Rohilla (though the converted track was opened for public use only in October 2007).

In 2015 and 2016, work of doubling of Ghaziabad–Meerut–Khatauli (Muzaffarnagar) section of Meerut–Muzaffarnagar–Saharanpur tracks was completed.

In January 2016, the 140-kilometre-long (87 mi) Ghaziabad–Moradabad line was completely electrified. The Ghaziabad–Meerut–Muzaffarnagar–Saharanpur–Roorkee–Haridwar line is also open to electric trains with effect from March 2016.

In 2016, Vivaan Solar, a Gwalior-based company won the contract to install 2.2 MW of rooftop solar project at the Delhi Junction railway station in late 2016. The solar power project to be set up under public–private partnership will be executed on design, build, finance, operate and transfer (DBFOT) basis. The company will also be responsible for maintenance of the plant for a period of 25 years.

In 2016–17 Rail Budget, Yamunanagar–Chandigarh line re-survey for this ₹875 crore line was announced at the cost of ₹25 crore.

In 2017–18, Indian Railway approved Panipat–Jind line and Panipat–Rohtak line electrification for ₹980 crore and new rail line Panipat–Shamli–Baghpat–Meerut for ₹2200 crore.

In December 2017, National Capital Region Transport Corporation signed agreements with Administrador de Infraestructuras Ferroviarias (Spain's state owned company) and Société nationale des chemins de fer français (France's state owned company) to cooperate on the development of rapid rail smart projects, including Delhi–Meerut Smart Line, Delhi–Panipat Smart Line and Delhi–Alwar Smart Line have been prioritised for implementation in the first phase of NCR RRTS where these three lines will operate from Sarai Kale Khan in Delhi. Designed with 180 km/h design speed, 160 km/h operational speed, and 100 km/h average speed, of six-car trains carrying 1,154 passengers running every 5 to 10 minutes on either underground or elevated point-to-point tracks where passengers will not have to change trains. 35-40% funding will be equity from Centre and state governments and the remaining 60% will come from multilateral funding agencies. In 2017 December, National Capital Region Transport Corporation signed agreements with Administrador de Infraestructuras Ferroviarias (Spain's state owned company) and Société nationale des chemins de fer français (France's state owned company) to cooperate on the development of rapid rail smart projects, including Delhi–Meerut Smart Line, Delhi–Panipat Smart Line and Delhi–Alwar Smart Line have been prioritised for implementation in the first phase of NCR RRTS where these three lines will operate from Sarai Kale Khan in Delhi. NCRTC has commissioned a traffic pattern study by the Delhi Integrated Multi-Modal Transit System (DIMTS) that will determine rote and the design of stations depending on the traffic. ₹32,598 crore Delhi–Ghaziabad–Meerut RRTS will be implemented first, ground clearance is underway in December 2017, construction will commence by June 2018 and completed by 2024, for which pre-construction activities including geo-technical investigations, detailed design, utility-shifting planning and traffic diversion planning are in progress. ₹30,000 crore Delhi–Panipat Smart Line and 180.5 km will cost around ₹37,539 crore Delhi–Alwar Smart Line are awaiting DPR approval, construction to commence by the end of 2018 and completed before 2025. Delhi–Alwar line will have 19 stations, 9 underground stations from ISBT Kashmere Gate to Kherki Daula and 10 elevated stations on 124.5 km route.

By December 2017, railways for the first time installed 6,095 GPS-enabled "Fog Pilot Assistance System" railway signalling devices in four most affected zones, Northern Railway zone, North Central Railway zone, North Eastern Railway zone and North Western Railway zone.

== Divisions ==
The Zonal Headquarters Office of Northern Railways is at Baroda House, New Delhi, and it has 6 railway divisions, whose divisional headquarters are located at:

- Ambala railway division at Ambala (Haryana),
- Delhi railway division at Delhi,
- Firozpur railway division at Firozpur (Punjab),
- Lucknow NR railway division at Lucknow (Uttar Pradesh)
- Moradabad railway division at Moradabad (Western Uttar Pradesh)
- Jammu railway division at Jammu (Jammu and Kashmir).

The first passenger railway line in North India opened from Allahabad to Kanpur on 3 March 1859. This was followed in 1889, by the Delhi–Panipat–Ambala–Kalka line. Northern Railways previously consisted of eight divisional zones: Allahabad, Bikaner, Jodhpur, Delhi, Moradabad, Ferozpur, Ambala, and Lucknow, spanning most of North India. With the re-organisation of zones by the Indian Railways, Northern Railway zone came to its present form on 14 April 1952 and it now consists of six divisional zones. The Jammu railway division is the latest division which came to existence in 2025.

== Major stations in Northern Railway Zone ==
Below is a list of the breakup of stations by category.

Category of stations	Name of stations
NSG-1	Delhi Jn., Hazarat Nizamuddin Jn., New Delhi
NSG-2	Ambala Cantt. Jn., Amritsar Jn, Anand Vihar Terminal, Chandigarh, Delhi-Sarai Rohilla, Ghaziabad Jn, Haridwar Jn., Jalandhar City Jn., Jammu Tawi, Lucknow Jn.,Bareilly Jn. , Ludhiana Jn., Sonipat, Varanasi Jn.
NSG-3	Ayodhya Cantt, Bathinda Jn, Beas Jn, Dehra Dun, Delhi Cantt., Delhi-Shahdara Jn., Faizabad Jn., Faridabad, Firozpur Cantt. Jn., Gurgaon, Hardoi, Jalandhar Cantt. Jn., Jaunpur Jn., Kalka, Meerut City Jn., Moradabad Jn., Muzaffarnagar, Palwal, Panipat Jn., Pathankot Cantt, Phagwara Jn., Partapgarh Jn, Rae Bareli Jn., Rohtak Jn., Roorkee, Saharanpur Jn., Shahganj Jn., Shahjahanpur Jn., Shri Mata Vaishno Devi Katra, Sultanpur Jn.
NSG-4	Abohar, Amethi, Amroha, Ayodhya, Bahadurgarh, Ballabgarh, Barabanki Jn., Baraut, Bhadohi, Chandausi Jn., Faridabad New Town, Ganaur, Hapur Jn., Janghai Jn., Jaunpur City, Karnal, Kurukshetra Jn., Modinagar, Najibabad Jn., Nangloi, Narela, Noli, Palam, Patiala, Pataudi Road, Prayag Jn., Rajpura Jn., Rampur, Sadar Bazar, Sahibabad, Shakur Basti, Sirhind Jn., Tugalakabad, Unnao Jn.
NSG-5	Adarsh Nagar Delhi, Alam Nagar, Amb Andaura, Ambala City, Anandpur Sahib, Anantnag, Anji Shahabad, Aonla, Asaoti, Babrala, Bachhrawn, Badshahpur, Badli, Baghpat Road, Balamau Jn., Barara, Barnala, Batala Jn., Bijnor, Bisharatganj, Budhlada, Bulandshahr, Chandpur Siau Halt, Dabtara, Daryabad, Dasua, Dehradun, Delhi-Kishanganj, Delhi-Safdar Jang, Deoband, Dhampur, Dhandari Kalan, Dhariwal, Dhuri Jn., Dinanagar, Faridkot, Fazilka Jn., Gajraula Jn., Gangsar Jaitu, Garhi Harsaru Jn., Garhmuktesar, Gauriganj, Giddarbaha, Goshainganj, Gurdaspur, Haldaur, Hoshiarpur, Jagadhri Workshop, Jais, Jakhal Jn., Jind Jn., Julana, Kaithal, Kapurthala, Kartarpur, Kashi, Kathua, Khanna, Khatauli, Khekra, Kot Kapura Jn., Kotdwara, Kunda Harnamganj, Laksar Jn., Lalganj, Lalgopalganj, Lambhua, Lohian Khas Jn., Makhu, Malerkotla, Malipur, Malout, Mandi Gobind Garh, Mansa, Mariahu, Maur, Meerut Cantt, Mukerian, Muktsar, Muradnagar, Musafirkhana, Nabha, Nagina, Nakodar Jn., Nangal Dam, Narwana Jn., Nihalgarh, Okhla, Phaphamau Jn., Phillaur Jn., Phulpur, Pilkhua, Pitambarpur, Raiwala Jn., Rampura Phul, Rishikesh, Roop Nagar, Rudauli, Sahibzada Ajit Singh Nagar, Samalkha, Samba, Sampla, Sandila, Sangrur, Seohara, Shamli, Shimla, Shivaji Bridge, Sitapur City Jn., Sri Krishna Nagar, Subzi Mandi, Sunam Udham Singh Wala, Suriawan, Tapri Jn., Tilak Bridge, Tilhar, Tohana, Una Himachal, Unchahar Jn., Vivek Vihar, Yamunanagar Jagadhri, Yog Nagari Rishikesh, Zafarabad Jn.
NSG-6	
SG-1	
SG-2	
SG-3	
HG-1	
HG-2	
HG-3	

== Amrit Bharat Station Scheme in Northern Railway Zone ==
The Amrit Bharat Station Scheme in Northern Railway Zone is a significant infrastructure project under the Ministry of Railways, aimed at the long-term redevelopment of 151 railway stations in the Northern Railway (NR) zone. Launched as part of a national initiative by Prime Minister Narendra Modi in August 2023 and furthered in February 2024, the scheme aims to transform these stations into modern "City Centres" that integrate transportation with social and economic hubs. The table below lists all the stations under the project.

S.no	Division	Count	Name of stations
1	Ambala (UMB)	19	Abohar, Amb andaura, Ambala Cantt. Jn., Ambala City, Anandpur Sahib, Bathinda Jn., Chandigarh, Dhuri Jn., Kalka, Malerkotla, Nangal Dam, Patiala, Roop Nagar, Saharanpur Jn., Sahibzada Ajit Singh Nagar (Mohali), Sangrur, Shimla, Sirhind Jn. & Yamunanagar jagadhari
2	Delhi (DLI)	34	Adarsh Nagar Delhi, Anand Vihar Terminal, Bahadurgarh, Ballabgarh, Bijwasan, Delhi Cantt., Delhi Jn., Delhi-Safdar Jang, Delhi-Sarai Rohilla, Delhi-Shahdara Jn., Faridabad, Faridabad New Town, Ghaziabad Jn., Gohana, Gurgaon, Hazrat Nizamuddin Jn. , Jind Jn., Karnal, Kurukshetra Jn., Mansa, Meerut City Jn., Modinagar, Muzaffarnagar, Narela,Narwana Jn., New Delhi, Palwal,Panipat Jn., Pataudi Road, Rohtak Jn., Shamli, Sonipat, Subzi Mandi & Tilak Bridge
3	Firozpur (FZR)	15	Amritsar Jn., Beas JN., Dhandari Kalan, Fazilka Jn., Firozpur Cantt. Jn., Hoshiarpur, Jalandhar Cantt. Jn., Jalandhar City Jn., Kapurthala, Kot Kapura Jn., Ludhiana Jn., Moga, Muktsar, Phagwara Jn. & Phillaur Jn.
4	Jammu (JAT) Included under Firozpur/Northern HQ for administrative ABSS purposes.	9	Budgam, Baijnath Paprola, Gurdaspur, Jammu Tawi, Martyr Captain Tushar Mahajan, Palampur Himachal, Pathankot Cantt, Pathankot Jn. & Shri Mata Vaishno Devi Katra
5	Lucknow (LKO)	44	Akbarpur Jn., Amethi, Ayodhya Dham Junction, Babatpur, Bachhrawn, Badshahpur, Bara Banki Jn., Bhadohi, Bharatkund, Chilbila Jn., Darshannagar, Gauriganj, Haidergarh, Janghai Jn., Jaunpur City, Jaunpur jn., Kanpur Bridge, Kashi, Kunda Harnamganj, Lalganj, Lambhua, Lohta, Lucknow Jn., Maa Belha Devi Dham Pratapgarh Junction, Maharaja Bijli Pasi, Malhour, Manak Nagar, Mariahu, Mohanlalganj, Phaphamau Jn., Phulpur, Prayag Jn., Rae Bareli Jn., Shahganj Jn., Shiupur, Sri Krishna Nagar, Sultanpur Jn., Takia, Unchahar Jn., Unnao Jn., Utraitia Jn., Varanasi Jn., Vyasanagar & Zafarabad Jn.
6	Moradabad (MB)	23	Amroha, Aonla, Balamau Jn., Bareilly Jn., Bijnor, Bulandshahr, Chandausi Jn., Dehra Dun, Dhampur, Gajraula Jn., Garhmuktesar, Hapur jn., Hardoi , Haridwar Jn., Harrawala, Kotdwara, Moradabad Jn., Nagina, Najibabad Jn., Rampur, Roorkee, Seohara & Shahjahanpur Jn.

== State wise Stations under Amrit Bharat Station scheme ==
The Amrit Bharat Station Scheme, as of March 2026, encompasses 144 railway stations under the jurisdiction of the Northern Railway (NR) zone, distributed across several states and union territories in North India. Uttar Pradesh holds the largest share of the project with 61 stations, primarily managed by the Lucknow and Moradabad divisions, including major hubs like Varanasi Jn. and Ayodhya Dham Junction. Punjab follows with 29 stations, featuring significant redevelopment at sites such as Amritsar Jn., Ludhiana Jn., and Jalandhar City Jn. In Haryana, 20 stations have been identified for upgrades, with a heavy concentration in the Delhi and Ambala divisions, covering locations like Faridabad, Rohtak Jn. and Ambala Cantt.

The National Capital Territory of Delhi includes 14 stations under the scheme, with New Delhi (NDLS) representing the most significant financial investment at a project cost of 4,744 Cr. In the Himalayan regions, Himachal Pradesh and Uttarakhand have 6 and 5 stations respectively, including high-profile tourist destinations like Shimla, Haridwar Jn., and Dehra Dun. The Union Territory of Jammu and Kashmir accounts for 4 stations, notably Jammu Tawi and Shri Mata Vaishno Devi Katra. The Union Territory of Chandigarh is represented by a single station Chandigarh (CDG) which has an allocated project cost of 436.29 Cr.

S. No.	Name of Station	State	Division	Category	Executing Agency
1	Abohar (ABS)	Punjab	Ambala	NSG4	Gati Shakti Unit
2	Amb Andaura (AADR)	Himachal Pradesh	Ambala	NSG4	Gati Shakti Unit
3	Ambala Cantt. Jn. (UMB)	Haryana	Ambala	NSG2	RLDA
4	Ambala City (UBC)	Haryana	Ambala	NSG5	Gati Shakti Unit
5	Anandpur Sahib (ANSB)	Punjab	Ambala	NSG5	Gati Shakti Unit
6	Bathinda Jn. (BTI)	Punjab	Ambala	NSG3	Construction Unit
7	Chandigarh (CDG)	Chandigarh	Ambala	NSG2	RLDA
8	Dhuri Jn. (DUI)	Punjab	Ambala	NSG5	Gati Shakti Unit
9	Kalka (KLK)	Haryana	Ambala	NSG3	Gati Shakti Unit
10	Malerkotla (MET)	Punjab	Ambala	NSG5	Gati Shakti Unit
11	Nangal Dam (NLDM)	Punjab	Ambala	NSG5	Gati Shakti Unit
12	Patiala (PTA)	Punjab	Ambala	NSG4	Gati Shakti Unit
13	Roop Nagar (RPAR)	Punjab	Ambala	NSG5	Gati Shakti Unit
14	Saharanpur Jn. (SRE)	Uttar Pradesh	Ambala	NSG3	Gati Shakti Unit
15	SAS Nagar Mohali (SASN)	Punjab	Ambala	NSG5	Gati Shakti Unit
16	Sangrur (SAG)	Punjab	Ambala	NSG5	Gati Shakti Unit
17	Shimla (SML)	Himachal Pradesh	Ambala	NSG5	Gati Shakti Unit
18	Sirhind Jn. (SIR)	Punjab	Ambala	NSG4	Gati Shakti Unit
19	Yamunanagar Jagadhari (YJUD)	Haryana	Ambala	NSG3	Gati Shakti Unit
20	Adarsh Nagar Delhi (ANDI)	Delhi	Delhi	NSG5	Construction Unit
21	Anand Vihar Terminal (ANVT)	Delhi	Delhi	NSG1	RLDA
22	Bahadurgarh (BGZ)	Haryana	Delhi	NSG4	Gati Shakti Unit
23	Ballabgarh (BVH)	Haryana	Delhi	NSG5	Gati Shakti Unit
24	Bijwasan (BWSN)	Delhi	Delhi	NSG6	RLDA
25	Delhi Cantt. (DEC)	Delhi	Delhi	NSG3	RLDA
26	Delhi Jn. (DLI)	Delhi	Delhi	NSG1	RLDA
27	Delhi-Safdar Jang (DSJ)	Delhi	Delhi	NSG4	RLDA
28	Delhi-Sarai Rohilla (DEE)	Delhi	Delhi	NSG2	Gati Shakti Unit
29	Delhi-Shahdara Jn. (DSA)	Delhi	Delhi	NSG4	Construction Unit
30	Faridabad (FDB)	Haryana	Delhi	NSG3	Construction Unit
31	Faridabad New Town (FDN)	Haryana	Delhi	NSG5	Gati Shakti Unit
32	Ghaziabad Jn. (GZB)	Uttar Pradesh	Delhi	NSG2	Construction Unit
33	Gohana (GHNA)	Haryana	Delhi	NSG6	Gati Shakti Unit
34	Gurgaon (GGN)	Haryana	Delhi	NSG3	RLDA
35	Hazrat Nizamuddin Jn. (NZM)	Delhi	Delhi	NSG1	RLDA
36	Jind Jn. (JIND)	Haryana	Delhi	NSG4	Gati Shakti Unit
37	Karnal (KUN)	Haryana	Delhi	NSG3	Construction Unit
38	Kurukshetra Jn. (KKDE)	Haryana	Delhi	NSG3	Construction Unit
39	Mansa (MSZ)	Punjab	Delhi	NSG5	Gati Shakti Unit
40	Meerut City Jn. (MTC)	Uttar Pradesh	Delhi	NSG3	Construction Unit
41	Modinagar (MDNR)	Uttar Pradesh	Delhi	NSG4	Gati Shakti Unit
42	Muzaffarnagar (MOZ)	Uttar Pradesh	Delhi	NSG3	Gati Shakti Unit
43	Narela (NUR)	Delhi	Delhi	NSG4	Gati Shakti Unit
44	Narwana Jn. (NRW)	Haryana	Delhi	NSG5	Gati Shakti Unit
45	New Delhi (NDLS)	Delhi	Delhi	NSG1	RLDA
46	Palwal (PWL)	Haryana	Delhi	NSG4	Gati Shakti Unit
47	Panipat Jn. (PNP)	Haryana	Delhi	NSG3	Construction Unit
48	Pataudi Road (PTRD)	Haryana	Delhi	NSG5	Gati Shakti Unit
49	Rohtak Jn. (ROK)	Haryana	Delhi	NSG3	Gati Shakti Unit
50	Shamli (SMQL)	Uttar Pradesh	Delhi	NSG5	Gati Shakti Unit
51	Sonipat (SNP)	Haryana	Delhi	NSG3	Gati Shakti Unit
52	Subzi Mandi (SZM)	Delhi	Delhi	NSG4	Gati Shakti Unit
53	Tilak Bridge (TKJ)	Delhi	Delhi	NSG6	Gati Shakti Unit
54	Amritsar Jn. (ASR)	Punjab	Firozpur	NSG2	Construction Unit
55	Beas JN (BEAS)	Punjab	Firozpur	NSG3	Construction Unit
56	Dhandari Kalan (DDL)	Punjab	Firozpur	NSG4	Gati Shakti Unit
57	Fazilka Jn. (FKA)	Punjab	Firozpur	NSG5	Gati Shakti Unit
58	Firozpur Cantt. Jn. (FZR)	Punjab	Firozpur	NSG3	Gati Shakti Unit
59	Hoshiarpur (HSX)	Punjab	Firozpur	NSG5	Gati Shakti Unit
60	Jalandhar Cantt. Jn. (JRC)	Punjab	Firozpur	NSG3	Construction Unit
61	Jalandhar City Jn. (JUC)	Punjab	Firozpur	NSG2	Construction Unit
62	Kapurthala (KXH)	Punjab	Firozpur	NSG5	Gati Shakti Unit
63	Kot Kapura Jn. (KKP)	Punjab	Firozpur	NSG5	Gati Shakti Unit
64	Ludhiana Jn. (LDH)	Punjab	Firozpur	NSG2	Construction Unit
65	Moga (MOGA)	Punjab	Firozpur	NSG5	Gati Shakti Unit
66	Muktsar (MKS)	Punjab	Firozpur	NSG5	Gati Shakti Unit
67	Phagwara Jn. (PGW)	Punjab	Firozpur	NSG3	Gati Shakti Unit
68	Phillaur Jn. (PHR)	Punjab	Firozpur	NSG4	Gati Shakti Unit
69	Baijnath Paprola (BJPL)	Himachal Pradesh	Jammu	NSG6	Gati Shakti Unit
70	Budgam (BDGM)	Jammu and Kashmir	Jammu	NSG6	Gati Shakti Unit
71	Gurdaspur (GSP)	Punjab	Jammu	NSG5	Gati Shakti Unit
72	Jammu Tawi (JAT)	Jammu and Kashmir	Jammu	NSG2	Construction Unit
73	MCT Mahajan (MCTM)	Jammu and Kashmir	Jammu	NSG3	Gati Shakti Unit
74	Palampur Himachal (PLMX)	Himachal Pradesh	Jammu	NSG4	Construction Unit
75	Pathankot Cantt (PTKC)	Punjab	Jammu	NSG3	Construction Unit
76	Pathankot Jn. (PTK)	Punjab	Jammu	NSG4	Gati Shakti Unit
77	SMVD Katra (SVDK)	Jammu and Kashmir	Jammu	NSG2	Gati Shakti Unit
78	Akbarpur Jn. (ABP)	Uttar Pradesh	Lucknow	NSG3	Gati Shakti Unit
79	Amethi (AME)	Uttar Pradesh	Lucknow	NSG4	Gati Shakti Unit
80	Ayodhya Dham Jn. (AY)	Uttar Pradesh	Lucknow	NSG3	Construction Unit
81	Babatpur (BTP)	Uttar Pradesh	Lucknow	NSG6	Gati Shakti Unit
82	Bachhrawn (BCN)	Uttar Pradesh	Lucknow	NSG5	Gati Shakti Unit
83	Badshahpur (BSE)	Uttar Pradesh	Lucknow	NSG5	Gati Shakti Unit
84	Bara Banki Jn. (BBK)	Uttar Pradesh	Lucknow	NSG3	Gati Shakti Unit
85	Bhadohi (BOY)	Uttar Pradesh	Lucknow	NSG3	Gati Shakti Unit
86	Bharatkund (BTKD)	Uttar Pradesh	Lucknow	NSG6	Gati Shakti Unit
87	Chilbila Jn. (CIL)	Uttar Pradesh	Lucknow	NSG6	Gati Shakti Unit
88	Darshannagar (DRG)	Uttar Pradesh	Lucknow	NSG6	Gati Shakti Unit
89	Gauriganj (GNG)	Uttar Pradesh	Lucknow	NSG5	Gati Shakti Unit
90	Haidergarh (HGH)	Uttar Pradesh	Lucknow	NSG6	Gati Shakti Unit
91	Janghai Jn. (JNH)	Uttar Pradesh	Lucknow	NSG3	Gati Shakti Unit
92	Jaunpur City (JOP)	Uttar Pradesh	Lucknow	NSG4	Gati Shakti Unit
93	Jaunpur Jn. (JNU)	Uttar Pradesh	Lucknow	NSG3	Gati Shakti Unit
94	Kanpur Bridge (RB) (CPB)	Uttar Pradesh	Lucknow	NSG6	Gati Shakti Unit
95	Kashi (KEI)	Uttar Pradesh	Lucknow	NSG5	Construction Unit
96	Kunda Harnamganj (KHNM)	Uttar Pradesh	Lucknow	NSG5	Gati Shakti Unit
97	Lalganj (LLJ)	Uttar Pradesh	Lucknow	NSG5	Gati Shakti Unit
98	Lambhua (LBA)	Uttar Pradesh	Lucknow	NSG5	Gati Shakti Unit
99	Lohta (LOT)	Uttar Pradesh	Lucknow	NSG6	Gati Shakti Unit
100	Lucknow Jn. (LKO)	Uttar Pradesh	Lucknow	NSG2	RLDA
101	MBDD Pratapgarh Jn. (MBDP)	Uttar Pradesh	Lucknow	NSG3	Gati Shakti Unit
102	Maharaja Bijli Pasi (MBLP)	Uttar Pradesh	Lucknow	NSG4	Gati Shakti Unit
103	Malhour (ML)	Uttar Pradesh	Lucknow	NSG6	Gati Shakti Unit
104	Manak Nagar (MKG)	Uttar Pradesh	Lucknow	NSG6	Gati Shakti Unit
105	Mariahu (MAY)	Uttar Pradesh	Lucknow	NSG5	Gati Shakti Unit
106	Mohanlalganj (MLJ)	Uttar Pradesh	Lucknow	NSG6	Gati Shakti Unit
107	Phaphamau Jn. (PFM)	Uttar Pradesh	Lucknow	NSG5	Division (Open Line) Unit
108	Phulpur (PLP)	Uttar Pradesh	Lucknow	NSG5	Gati Shakti Unit
109	Prayag Jn. (PRG)	Uttar Pradesh	Lucknow	NSG4	Division (Open Line) Unit
110	Rae Bareli Jn. (RBL)	Uttar Pradesh	Lucknow	NSG3	Gati Shakti Unit
111	Shahganj Jn. (SHG)	Uttar Pradesh	Lucknow	NSG3	Gati Shakti Unit
112	Shiupur (SOP)	Uttar Pradesh	Lucknow	NSG6	Gati Shakti Unit
113	Sri Krishna Nagar (SKN)	Uttar Pradesh	Lucknow	NSG5	Gati Shakti Unit
114	Sultanpur Jn. (SLN)	Uttar Pradesh	Lucknow	NSG3	Gati Shakti Unit
115	Takia (TQA)	Uttar Pradesh	Lucknow	NSG5	Gati Shakti Unit
116	Unchahar Jn. (UCR)	Uttar Pradesh	Lucknow	NSG5	Gati Shakti Unit
117	Unnao Jn. (ON)	Uttar Pradesh	Lucknow	NSG3	Gati Shakti Unit
118	Utraitia Jn. (UTR)	Uttar Pradesh	Lucknow	NSG6	Gati Shakti Unit
119	Varanasi Jn. (BSB)	Uttar Pradesh	Lucknow	NSG1	Construction Unit
120	Vyasanagar (VYN)	Uttar Pradesh	Lucknow	NSG6	Gati Shakti Unit
121	Zafarabad Jn. (ZBD)	Uttar Pradesh	Lucknow	NSG5	Gati Shakti Unit
122	Amroha (AMRO)	Uttar Pradesh	Moradabad	NSG5	Gati Shakti Unit
123	Aonla (AO)	Uttar Pradesh	Moradabad	NSG5	Gati Shakti Unit
124	Balamau Jn. (BLM)	Uttar Pradesh	Moradabad	NSG5	Gati Shakti Unit
125	Bareilly Jn. (BE)	Uttar Pradesh	Moradabad	NSG1	Gati Shakti Unit
126	Bijnor (BJO)	Uttar Pradesh	Moradabad	NSG5	Division (Open Line) Unit
127	Bulandshahr (BSC)	Uttar Pradesh	Moradabad	NSG5	Gati Shakti Unit
128	Chandausi Jn. (CH)	Uttar Pradesh	Moradabad	NSG4	Gati Shakti Unit
129	Dehra Dun (DDN)	Uttarakhand	Moradabad	NSG2	Gati Shakti Unit
130	Dhampur (DPR)	Uttar Pradesh	Moradabad	NSG5	Division (Open Line) Unit
131	Gajraula Jn. (GJL)	Uttar Pradesh	Moradabad	NSG5	Gati Shakti Unit
132	Garhmuktesar (GMS)	Uttar Pradesh	Moradabad	NSG5	Gati Shakti Unit
133	Hapur Jn. (HPU)	Uttar Pradesh	Moradabad	NSG4	Gati Shakti Unit
134	Hardoi (HRI)	Uttar Pradesh	Moradabad	NSG3	Gati Shakti Unit
135	Haridwar Jn. (HW)	Uttarakhand	Moradabad	NSG2	Gati Shakti Unit
136	Harrawala (HRW)	Uttarakhand	Moradabad	NSG6	Gati Shakti Unit
137	Kotdwara (KTW)	Uttarakhand	Moradabad	NSG5	Gati Shakti Unit
138	Moradabad Jn. (MB)	Uttar Pradesh	Moradabad	NSG2	Construction Unit
139	Nagina (NGG)	Uttar Pradesh	Moradabad	NSG5	Gati Shakti Unit
140	Najibabad Jn. (NBD)	Uttar Pradesh	Moradabad	NSG4	Gati Shakti Unit
141	Rampur (RMU)	Uttar Pradesh	Moradabad	NSG3	Gati Shakti Unit
142	Roorkee (RK)	Uttarakhand	Moradabad	NSG3	Gati Shakti Unit
143	Seohara (SEO)	Uttar Pradesh	Moradabad	NSG5	Gati Shakti Unit
144	Shahjahanpur Jn. (SPN)	Uttar Pradesh	Moradabad	NSG3	Gati Shakti Unit

== Infrastructure ==
On 19 February 1986, Northern Railways was the first zone to introduce the computerized passenger reservation system and was the first zone to do so. To facilitate the Unreserved travellers to also plan their journey ahead, Northern Railway introduced the Unreserved Ticketing System (UTS) whereby the unreserved rail passenger can purchase an unreserved ticket three days in advance from the current booking counters.

The first diesel and electric locomotive simulators in India at the Tughlakabad and Kanpur locomotive sheds were introduced by Northern Railways. These help upgrading the skills of the working and new drivers, providing them training for high-speed train operation. All workshops, diesel sheds and air brake freight departments are ISO 9000 certified. Diesel shed, Tughlaqabad has the distinction of being the first diesel shed to get ISO 14000 certification on the Indian Railway.

There are eight workshops operated by Northern Railways

Workshop	Location	State
Locomotive Workshop	Charbagh railway station, Lucknow	Uttar Pradesh
Carriage & Wagon Workshop	Alambagh, Lucknow	Uttar Pradesh
Carriage & Wagon Workshop	Yamunanagar-Jagadhari railway station, Yamunanagar	Haryana
Carriage & Wagon Workshop	Kalka	Haryana
Bridge Workshop	Jalandhar Cantonment	Punjab
Bridge Workshop	Lucknow	Uttar Pradesh
Engineering workshop	Jalandhar	Punjab
Signal & Telecom Workshop	Ghaziabad	Uttar Pradesh

Zonal Railway Training Institute (ZRTI) at Chandausi, Moradabad UP is the oldest (and North India's only) Railway Training Institute, where group C railway employees like Driver, Guard, Ticket Checker, Station Master, Traffic Inspector, Commercial Inspector, JE (signal & Telecom) etc. are trained for initial, promotional and refresher courses. ZRTI is an ISO 9001 Institute. Applicants pass All India Railway Examinations to get admission into the institute. ZRTI is headed by a senior Civil Services Officer.

== Routes ==
=== Express ===
- Haridwar–Jammu Tawi Express, between Haridwar and Jammu Tawi
- Kalka–Shri Mata Vaishno Devi Katra Express, between Kalka and Shri Mata Vaishno Devi Katra

== Jurisdiction ==
Northern Railways is one of nine old zones of Indian Railways and also the biggest in terms of network having 6807 kilometre route. It covers the states of Punjab, Haryana, Himachal Pradesh, Uttarakhand and Uttar Pradesh and the Union territories of Jammu and Kashmir, Delhi and Chandigarh.

== Background ==
Northern Railways implemented the route relay interlocking (RRI) system at New Delhi railway station which is a modern signaling system for enhancing efficiency and safety in the operations. This RRI system at New Delhi is one of the world's largest route relay interlocking system certified by the Guinness Book of Records. Northern Railway is equipped with 40 RRI systems including the system at Delhi Main.

Delhi Suburban Railway services is a commuter rail service operated by Northern Railway. It covers the city state of Delhi, along with the adjoining districts of Faridabad, Ghaziabad and other adjoining places in Haryana and Uttar Pradesh. These services are mostly run using EMU and MEMU rakes. In 2009 Ladies Special trains were introduced between New Delhi and Palwal. Two more ladies special trains will be connecting from the city to Ghaziabad and Panipat.

Starting with a part of Firozpur division of the Northern Railway zone, the line has been under construction since 1983; the Jammu–Udhampur–Srinagar–Baramulla Railway Link (JUSBRL) of the Jammu–Baramulla line is under construction in perhaps the most difficult terrain on the Indian subcontinent. The Northern Railway reached another landmark achievement by extending rail services in the Kashmir Valley on 28 October 2009 by commencing rail services between Anantnag and Qazigund of the Qazigund-Baramula rail project. Pir Panjal Railway Tunnel, the 10.96 km long railway tunnel, passes through the Pir Panjal Range of middle Himalayas in Jammu and Kashmir. It is a part of its Udhampur–Srinagar–Baramulla rail link project, opened in October 2011, India's longest and Asia's second longest railway tunnel and reduced the distance between Quazigund and Banihal to only 11 km.

Northern Railways in keeping the objective to achieve the target under National Solar Mission to maximize the use of solar power selected Vivaan Solar, a Gwalior-based company to install a total of five MW rooftop solar power project in 4 major railway stations of Delhi namely Anand Vihar, New Delhi, Old Delhi and Hazrat Nizamuddin respectively. The Public Private Partnership to install rooftop solar project was signed in late 2016. The solar power project is to be executed on design, build, finance, operate and transfer (DBFOT) basis and expected to be operational by August 2017. The company will also be responsible for maintaining the respective solar power plants with break up of 1.1 MW, 1.1 MW, 2.2 MW, and 0.6 MW respectively for a period of 25 years.

== Loco sheds ==
- Electric Loco Shed, Ghaziabad
- Electric Loco Shed, Ludhiana
- Electric Loco Shed, Saharanpur
- Electric Loco Shed, Khanalampura
- Diesel Loco Shed, Tughlakabad
- Diesel Loco Shed, Ludhiana
- Diesel Loco Shed, Roza
- Diesel Loco Shed, Alambagh(Lucknow)

== See also ==
- All India Station Masters' Association (AISMA)
- Zones and divisions of Indian Railways
- New Delhi railway station
- Delhi Junction railway station
- Delhi Sarai Rohilla railway station
- Lucknow NR
