= Jhelum Express =

Train in India

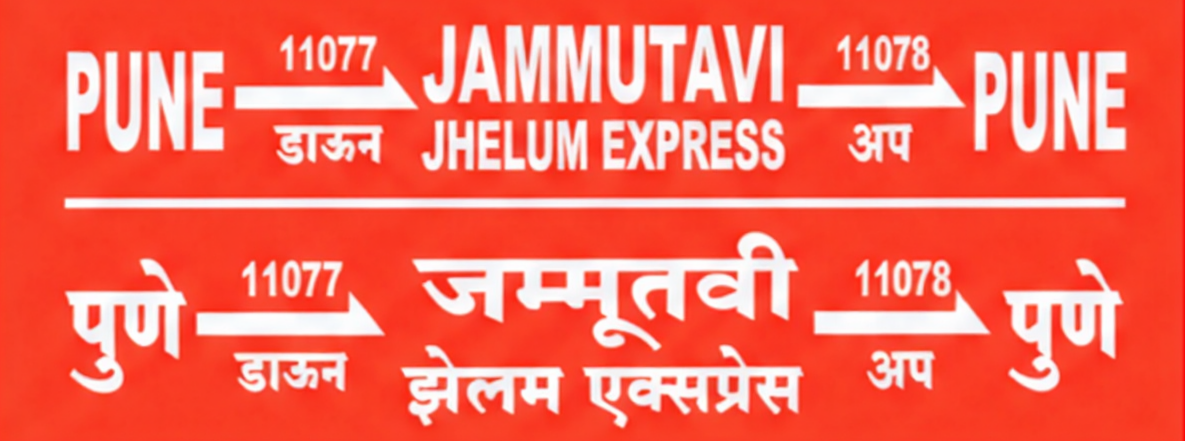

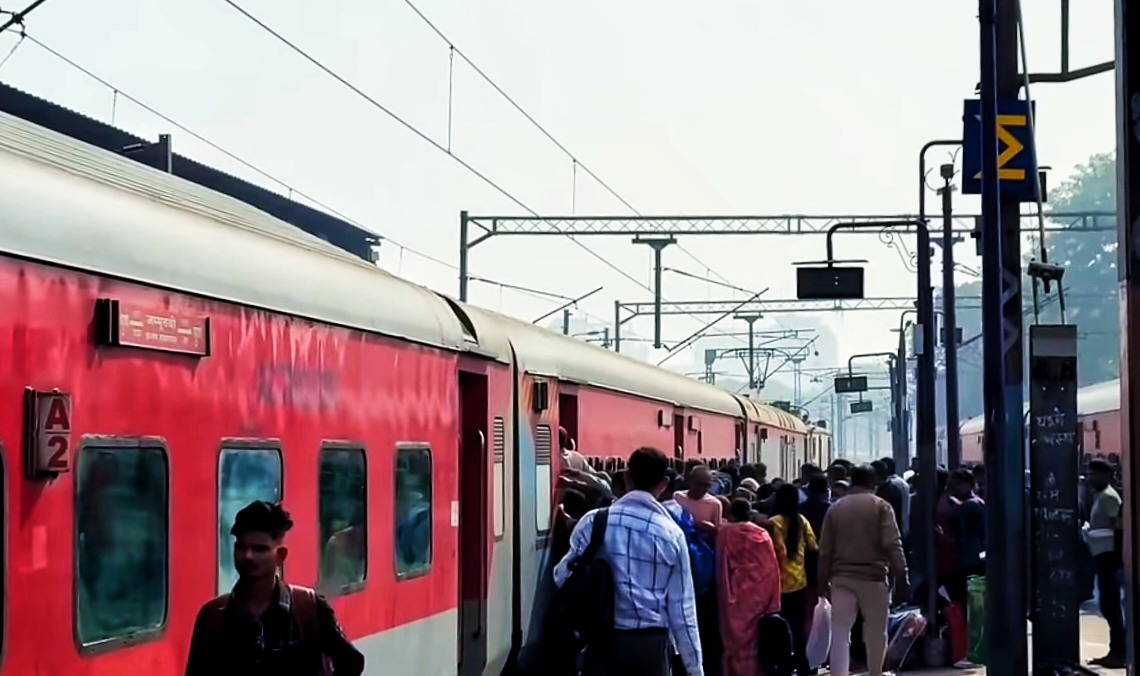
- Jhelum Express at Mathura Jn.

Overview
- Service type: Express
- First service: 15 April 1958; 68 years ago
- Current operator: Central Railway

Route
- Termini: Pune (PUNE); Jammu Tawi (JAT)
- Stops: 63
- Distance travelled: 2,171 km (1,349 mi)
- Average journey time: 40 hrs 25 mins
- Service frequency: Daily
- Train number: 11077 / 11078

On-board services
- Classes: AC 2 Tier, AC 3 Tier, Sleeper Class, General Unreserved
- Seating arrangements: Yes
- Sleeping arrangements: Yes
- Catering facilities: Available
- Observation facilities: Large windows
- Baggage facilities: Available
- Other facilities: Below the seats

Technical
- Rolling stock: LHB coach
- Track gauge: 1,676 mm (5 ft 6 in); Broad Gauge
- Operating speed: 54 km/h (34 mph) average including halts.
Route map
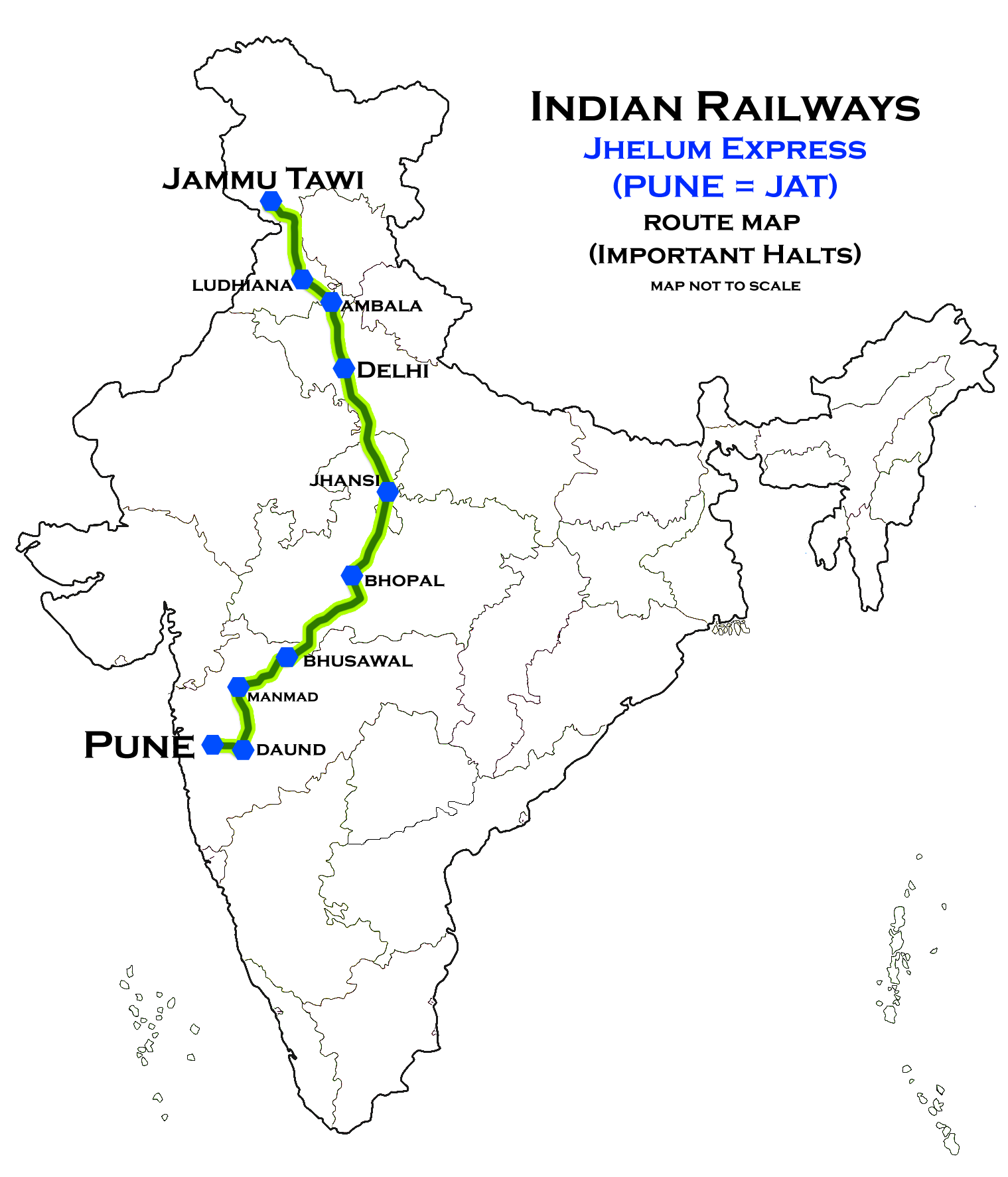

The 11077 / 11078 Jhelum Express is a daily express train on the Indian Railways. It runs from Pune, the cultural capital of Maharashtra, to Jammu Tawi, the winter capital of Jammu and Kashmir, in North India.

The train is strategically important, as it connects the headquarters of the Southern Command of the Indian Army, Pune, with an important border city. And Military Reserved compartment.

== History ==
The Jhelum Express is one of the oldest trains originating from Pune. Started in 1979, it was the first train connecting Pune to the capital city of New Delhi. The train was initially started for the military. Srinagar Express, predecessor, between Delhi and Pathankot during 1950's was extended till Pune and renamed as Jhelum Express.

== Number and nomenclature ==
Although it is River Tawi, a tributary of River Chenab which flows through the city of Jammu, the train is named after the Jhelum, often confused with the river is also a city on the banks of the river it's named after. This nomenclature was adopted at the behest of S. Prakash Singh Ghai, a partner at 'Ghai Brothers', a pioneer firm of railway contractors around the time the train first hit the tracks. The Ghai family hailed from the Pinanwal, a village in district Jhelum and settled in Pune post-partition. The Up train, Pune–Jammu Tawi, has the number 11077, while the Down train, Jammu Tawi–Pune, is numbered 11078.

== Route and halts ==
The 11077 / 11078 Jhelum Express runs from Pune Junction via Daund Chord Line, Ahilyanagar, Manmad Junction, Jalgaon Junction, Bhusaval Junction, Khandwa Junction, Itarsi Junction, Bhopal Junction, Bina, Jhansi Junction, Gwalior, Agra Cantonment, Mathura Junction, New Delhi, Narela, Sonipat Junction, Panipat, Kurukshetra Junction, Ambala Cantonment, Sirhind, Ludhiana, Jalandhar Cantonment, Pathankot Cantonment, Kathua to Jammu Tawi.

== Future prospects ==
With the doubling and electrification of the Daund–Manmad section and the Jalandhar–Pathankot–Jammu Tawi section, the Jhelum Express is expected to run faster, with comparatively less running time. Moreover, with the completion of Katra–Banihal section in 2018 December, the train is also expected to be extended to Srinagar, linking the important army setups in Kashmir with Northern Command headquarters in Udhampur and Southern Command headquarters in Pune. There is strong demand to extend this train up to Miraj junction which will facilitate military personnel and tourists from Sangli, Satara and Kolhapur districts.

== Traction ==
Initially it was hauled by Pune-based twin Alco WDM-2 or a single WDP-4 from Pune Junction till Manmad Junction after which it was hauled by a Bhusawal-based WAP-4 or Ghaziabad-based WAP-7 or WAP-4 until Jalandhar after which it was hauled by a Ludhiana-based WDM-3A till Jammu Tawi.

With the electrification of the Jalandhar–Pathankot-Jammu Tawi section in 2014 and Pune–Daund-Manmad section in 2016, it is hauled by a Ghaziabad Loco Shed-based WAP-7 or Bhusawal Loco Shed based WAP-4 electric locomotive on its entire journey.

== Coach composition ==
LOCO-SLR-GEN-GEN-S1-S2-S3-S4-S5-S6-S7-PC-B1-B2-B3-B4-B5-B6-A1-A2-GEN-GEN-EOG

For the train running from Pune to Jammu.This is the coach composition, and vice versa for the train running from Jammu Tawi to Pune Junction.

== Gallery ==
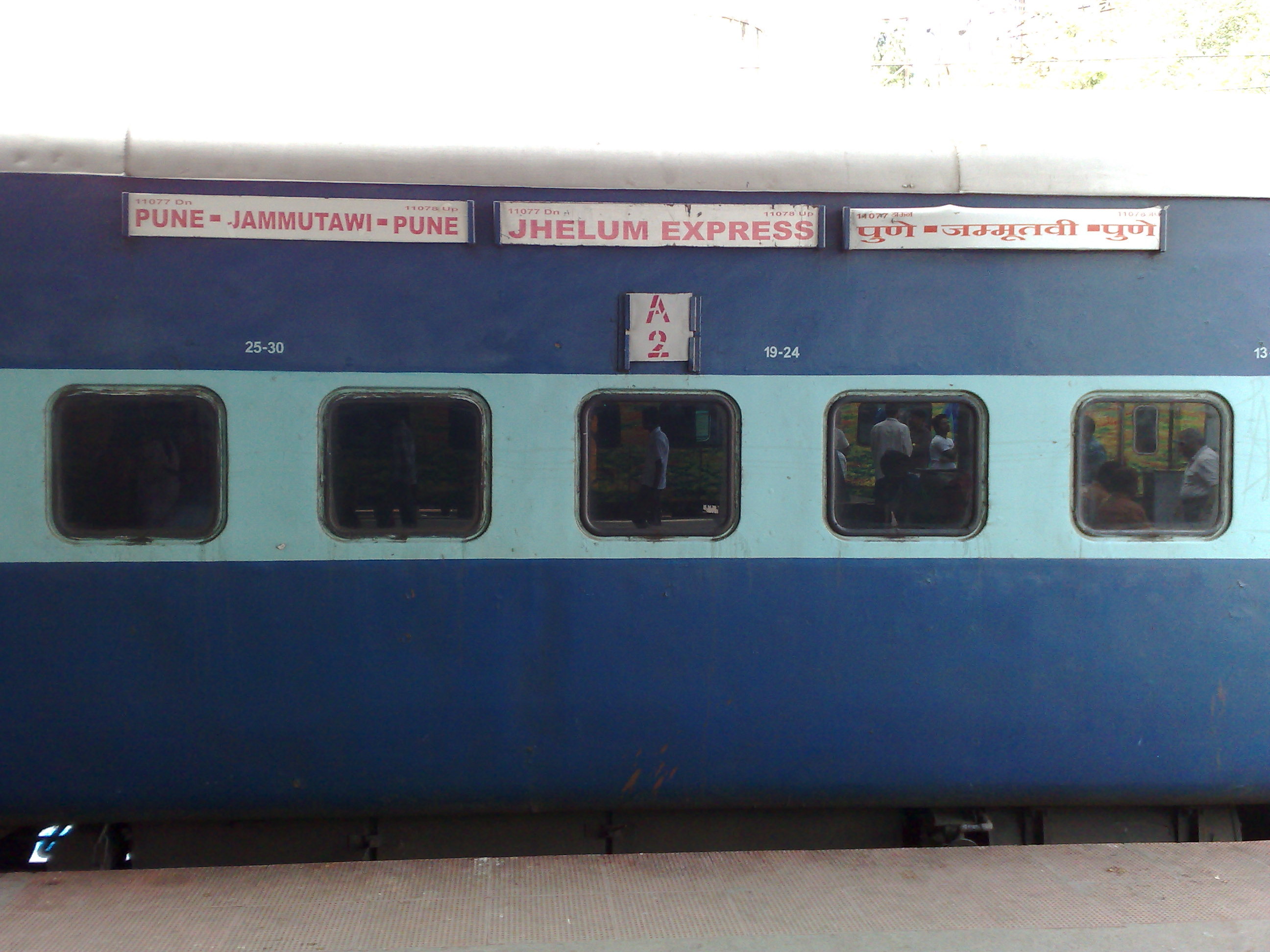
11077 Jhelum Express – AC 2 tier coach

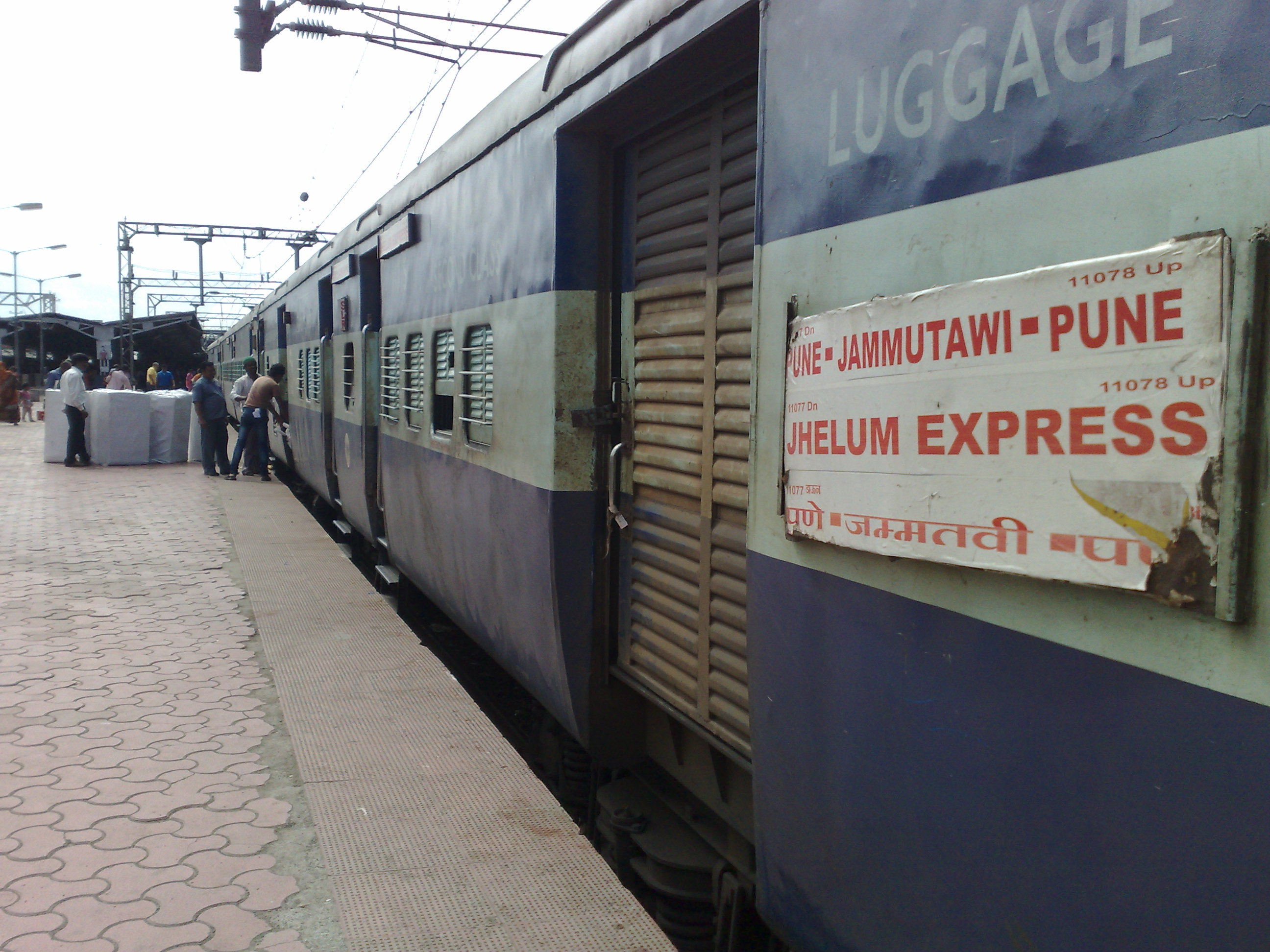
11077 Jhelum Express at Pune Junction

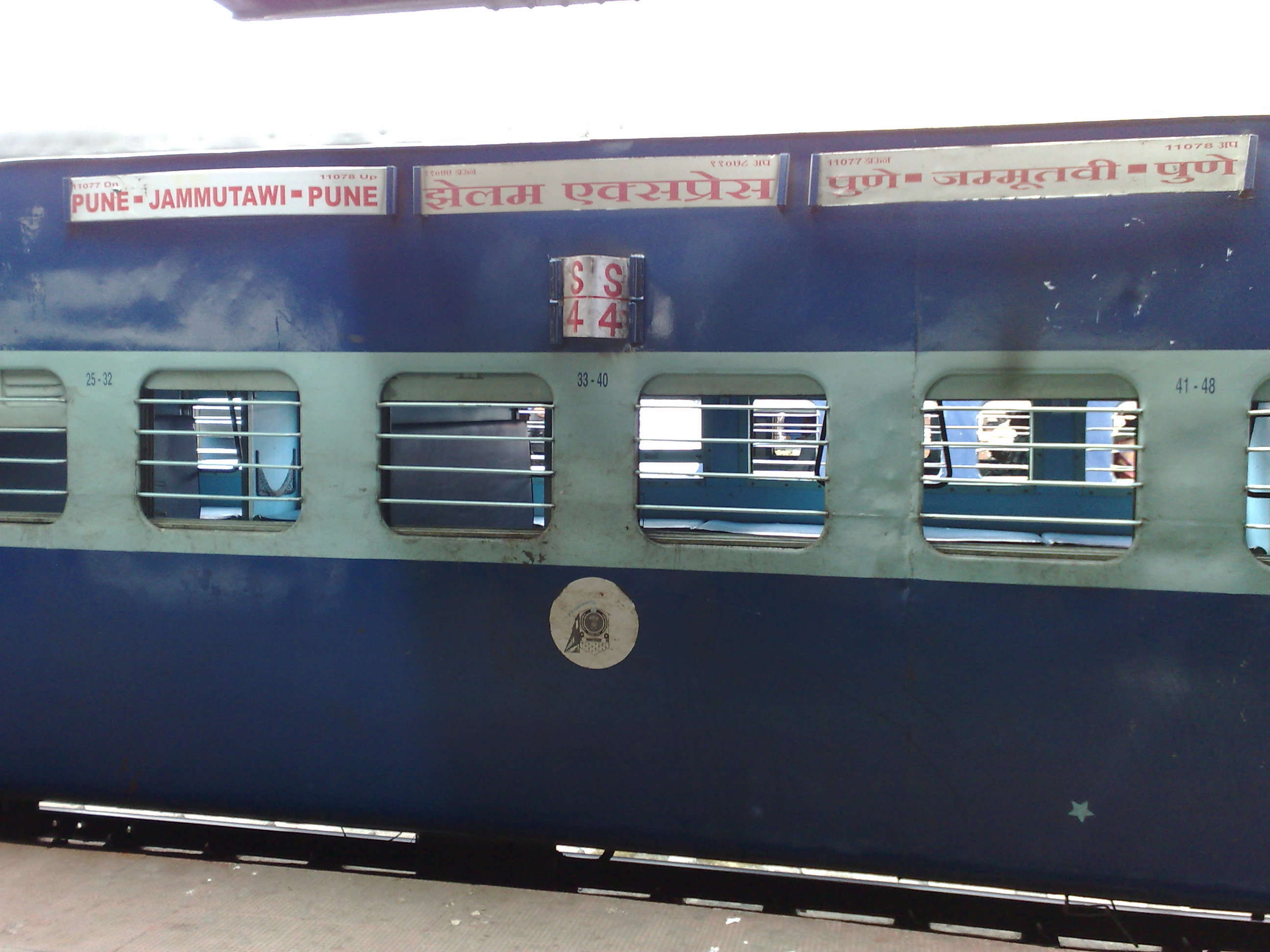
11077 Jhelum Express – Sleeper coach

== See also ==
- Shalimar Express
- Malwa Express
- Goa Express
- Swaraj Express
