= Malwa Express =

Train in India

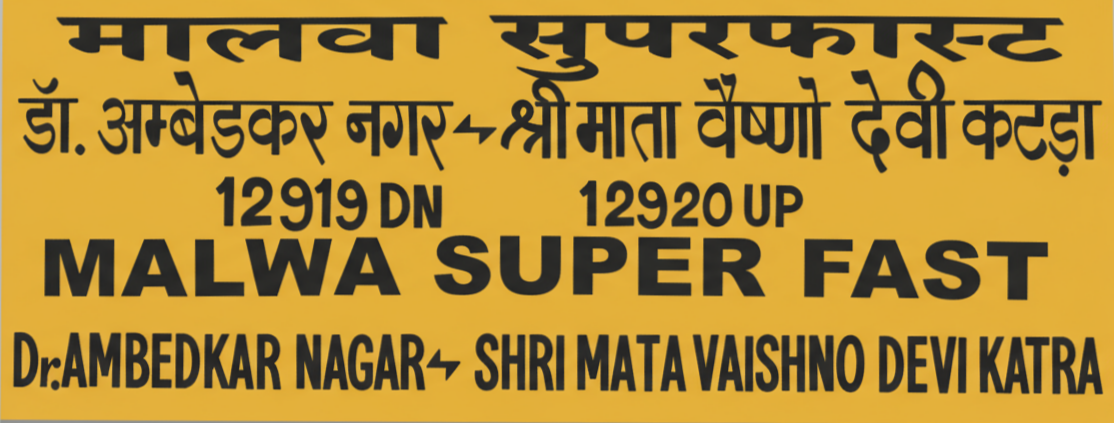

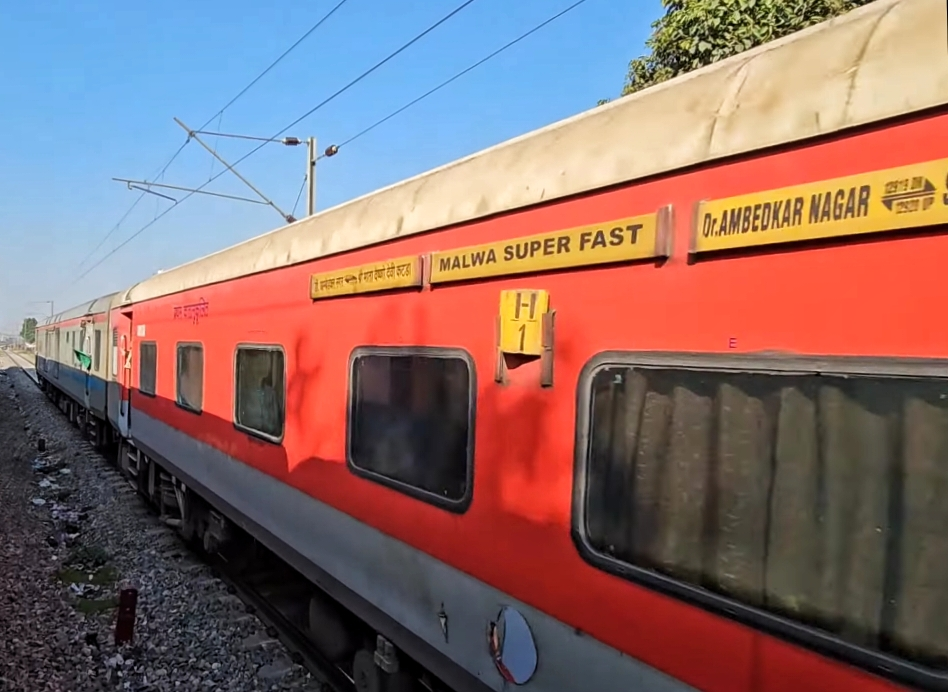
- Malwa Express At Karnal railway station

Overview
- Service type: Superfast
- Locale: Madhya Pradesh, Uttar Pradesh, Rajasthan, Haryana, Delhi, Punjab & Jammu & Kashmir
- First service: 2 April 1984; 42 years ago
- Current operator: Western Railway

Route
- Termini: Dr. Ambedkar Nagar (DADN); Shri Mata Vaishno Devi Katra (SVDK)
- Stops: 47
- Distance travelled: 1,641 km (1,020 mi)
- Average journey time: 30 hours 40 minutes
- Service frequency: Daily
- Train number: 12919 / 12920

On-board services
- Classes: AC First Class, AC 2 Tier, AC 3 Tier, AC 3 Tier Economy, Sleeper Class, General Unreserved
- Seating arrangements: Yes
- Sleeping arrangements: Yes
- Catering facilities: Available
- Observation facilities: Large windows
- Baggage facilities: Available
- Other facilities: Below the seats

Technical
- Rolling stock: LHB coach
- Track gauge: 1,676 mm (5 ft 6 in); Broad Gauge
- Operating speed: 54 km/h (34 mph) average including halts.
Route map
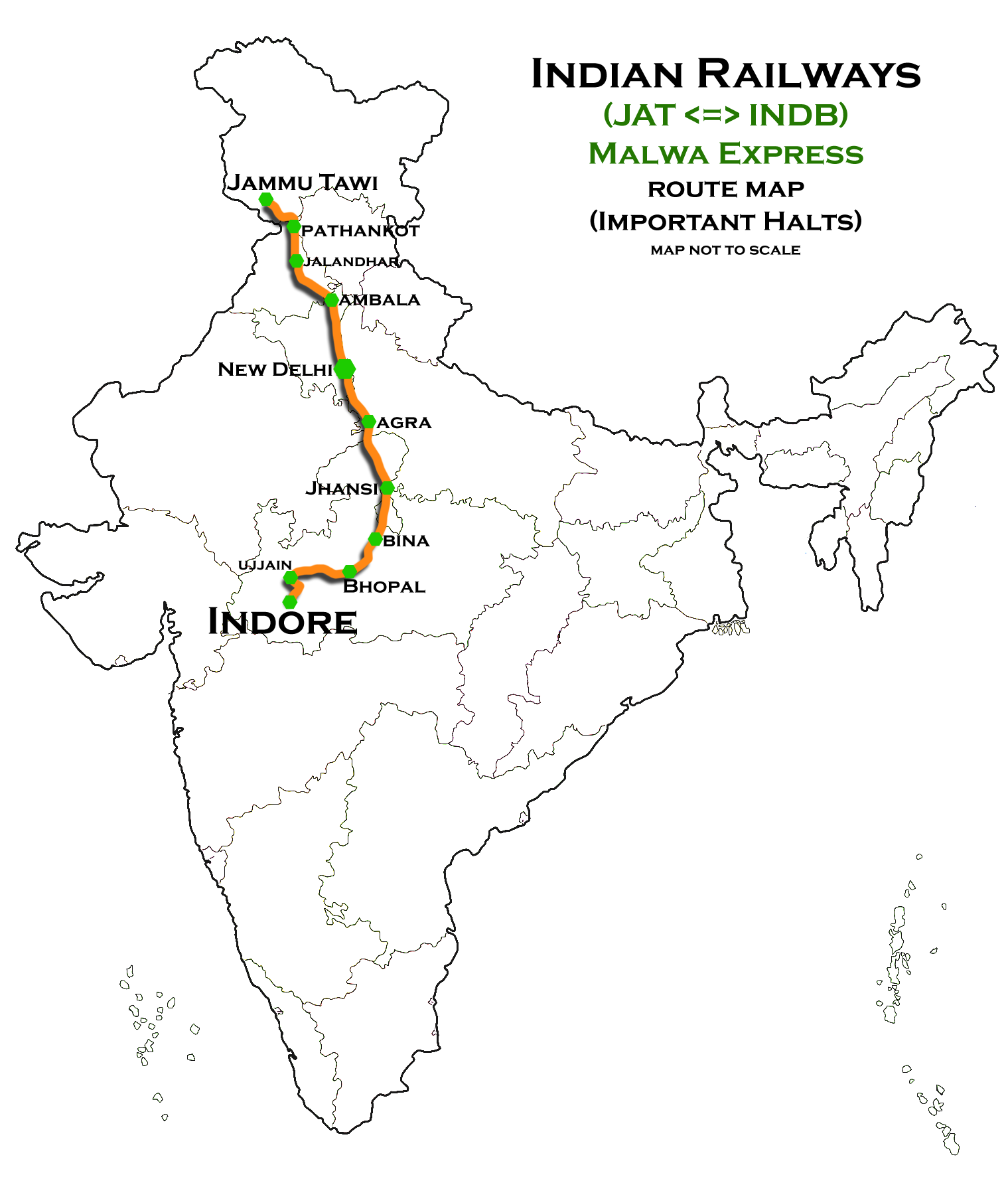

The 12919 / 12920 Malwa Express is a superfast express train service of the Indian Railways connecting Dr. Ambedkar Nagar of Madhya Pradesh and Shri Mata Vaishno Devi Katra of Jammu and Kashmir. It is currently being operated with 12919/12920 train numbers on a daily basis.

The name Malwa signifies the region of Madhya Pradesh where the city of Indore is located.

== History ==
This train was originally introduced between Indore Junction and New Delhi and was then extended to Jammu Tawi. It was the first Indian train to reach Pakistan as a diplomatic gesture. In mid 1982 contemporaneous Member of Parliament from Indore Prakash Chandra Sethi became Railway Minister for a short time, Sectioned Indore New Delhi Express which is named Malwa Express.

On 22 October 1985, it terminated at Lahore in Pakistan running as Indore–Lahore Special, but the service was withdrawn after 55 days due to controversies.

In June 2017, Malwa Express was extended up to Shri Mata Vaishno Devi Katra from Jammu Tawi.

It is the 5th train in India and Madhya Pradesh to get an ISO certificate, after the Bhopal Express, Rewanchal Express and Ahilyanagari Express.

In January 2019, Malwa Express was extended up to Dr. Ambedkar Nagar (Mhow) from Indore Junction.

In March 2020 it gets LHB coach.

== Coach composition ==
The train consists of 22 coaches:

- 1 First AC
- 2 AC II Tier
- 4 AC III Tier
- 2 AC Economy
- 6 Sleeper class
- 1 Pantry car
- 4 General Unreserved
- 1 SLRD
- 1 EOG
- There are 4 dedicated rakes for this train.

== Service ==
- The 12919/Malwa Superfast Express has an average speed of 55 km/h and covers 1641 km in 29 hrs 20 mins.
- The 12920/Malwa Superfast Express has an average speed of 55 km/h and covers 1641 km in 30 hrs 20 mins.

== Route and halts ==
The important halts of the train are:

- Dr. Ambedkar Nagar
- Indore Junction
- Dewas Junction
- Ujjain Junction
- Maksi Junction
- Bhopal Junction
- Vidisha
- Bina Junction
- Lalitpur Junction
- Jhansi Junction
- Gwalior Junction
- Dholpur Junction
- Agra Cantonment
- Mathura Junction
- Faridabad
- Hazrat Nizamuddin
- New Delhi
- Sonipat Junction
- Panipat Junction
- Kurukshetra Junction
- Ambala Cantonment
- Ludhiana Junction
- Jalandhar Cantonment
- Dasuya
- Pathankot Cantonment
- Kathua
- Jammu Tawi
- MCTM Udhampur
- Shri Mata Vaishno Devi Katra

== Placing of coaches ==
Placing of coach for 12919 Malwa Express.

Loco-EOG-H1-A1-A2-B1-B2-B3-B4-M1-M2-PC-S1-S2-S3-S4-S5-S6-GEN-GEN-GEN-GEN-SLR-UJN

Vice Versa for 12920 Malwa Express

== Schedule ==
Train number	Station code	Departure station	Departure time	Departure day	Arrival station	Arrival tme	Arrival dy
12919	DADN	Dr. Ambedkar Nagar	11:50 AM	Daily	Shri Mata Vaishno Devi Katra	Second day 05:10 PM	Daily
12920	SVDK	Shri Mata Vaishno Devi Katra	08:35 AM	Daily	Dr. Ambedkar Nagar	Second day 02:30 PM	Daily

== Reversals ==
The train is reversed twice at:

- Ujjain Junction
- Bhopal Junction

== Traction ==
Both trains are hauled by a Vadodara Loco Shed based WAP-7 electric locomotive between Dr. Ambedkar Nagar and Bhopal Junction. After Bhopal Junction, both trains are hauled by an Itarsi Loco Shed based WAP-7 electric locomotive upto Shri Mata Vaishno Devi Katra and vice versa.

== See also ==
- Indore–Jammu Tawi Weekly Superfast Express
- Indore–Chandigarh Weekly Express
- Indore–Dehradun Express
- Indore–Amritsar Express
- Indore–New Delhi Intercity Express
