= Indore–MCTM Udhampur Weekly Superfast Express =

Train in India

Indore-MCTM Udhampur Weekly Superfast Express

Overview
- Service type: Superfast Express
- First service: 29 December 2014; 11 years ago
- Current operator: Western Railway

Route
- Termini: Indore Junction (INDB); MCTM Udhampur (MCTM)
- Stops: 17
- Distance travelled: 1,476 km (917 mi)
- Average journey time: 22 hrs 40 mins
- Service frequency: Weekly
- Train number: 22941 / 22942

On-board services
- Classes: AC 2 Tier, AC 3 Tier, Sleeper Class, General Unreserved
- Seating arrangements: Yes
- Sleeping arrangements: Yes
- Catering facilities: Available
- Observation facilities: Large windows
- Baggage facilities: Available
- Other facilities: Below the seats

Technical
- Rolling stock: LHB coach
- Track gauge: Broad Gauge
- Operating speed: 65 km/h (40 mph) average including halts.

The 22941 / 22942 Indore–MCTM Udhampur Weekly Superfast Express is a superfast train of the Indian Railways which runs between Indore Junction of Madhya Pradesh and MCTM Udhampur of Jammu and Kashmir. The train is the second train between Indore and Jammu after Malwa Express.

== Coach Composition ==
The train consists of 22 coaches :

- 1 AC II Tier
- 3 AC III Tier
- 12 Sleepar Class
- 4 General Unreserved
- 2 Seating cum Luggage Rake

== Service ==
The 22941/Indore–MCTM Udhampur Weekly Superfast Express has an average speed of 65 km/h and covers 1476 km in 22 hrs 40 mins.

The 22942/MCTM Udhampur-Indore Weekly Superfast Express has an average speed of 65 km/h and covers 1476 km in 22 hrs 40 mins.

== Route and halts ==
The important halts of the train are :

- Indore Junction
- Dewas Junction
- Ujjain Junction
- Nagda Junction
- Bhawani Mandi
- Kota Junction
- Sawai Madhopur Junction
- Gangapur City
- Mathura Junction
- Delhi Safdarjung
- Panipat Junction
- Ambala Cantonment
- Ludhiana Junction
- Jalandhar Cantonment
- Pathankot Cantonment
- Jammu Tawi
- MCTM Udhampur

== Schedule ==
Train Number	Station Code	Departure Station	Departure Time	Departure Day	Arrival Station	Arrival Time	Arrival Day
22941	INDB	Indore Junction	23:55 PM	Mon	MCTM Udhampur	01:25 AM	Wed
22942	MCTM	MCTM Udhampur	05:00 AM	Wed	Indore Junction	05:15 AM	Thu

== Direction Reversal ==
The train reverses its direction once at:

- Nagda Junction.

== Traction ==
Both trains are hauled by a Vadodara Loco Shed based WAP-7 electric locomotive from Indore to MCTM Udhampur and vice versa.

== See also ==
- Indore-Chandigarh Weekly Express
- Indore-Dehradun Express
- Indore – Amritsar Express
- Malwa Express
