= Chandpur Siau railway station =

Railway station in Uttar Pradesh, India

General information
- Location: Main Market, Chowk Bazar, Chandpur, Bijnor, Uttar Pradesh; India
- Coordinates: 29.1319°N 78.2765°E
- Elevation: 90 metres (300 ft)
- System: Indian Railways station
- Owner: Indian Railways
- Operator: Northern Railway
- Platforms: 2
- Tracks: 4 (single diesel broad gauge)
- Connections: Auto stand

Construction
- Structure type: Standard (on-ground station)
- Parking: Yes
- Cycle facilities: No

Other information
- Status: Functioning
- Station code: CPS
- Zone(s): Northern Railway
- Division(s): Moradabad
Location
- Location within India Location within Uttar Pradesh

Chandpur Siau is a railway station in Chandpur, Bijnor, India, where Mussoorie Express, Garhwal Express, and Lucknow–Chandigarh Express trains stop. Its code is CPS. It serves Chandpur city.
