= Alamnagar railway station =

Railway station in Uttar Pradesh, India

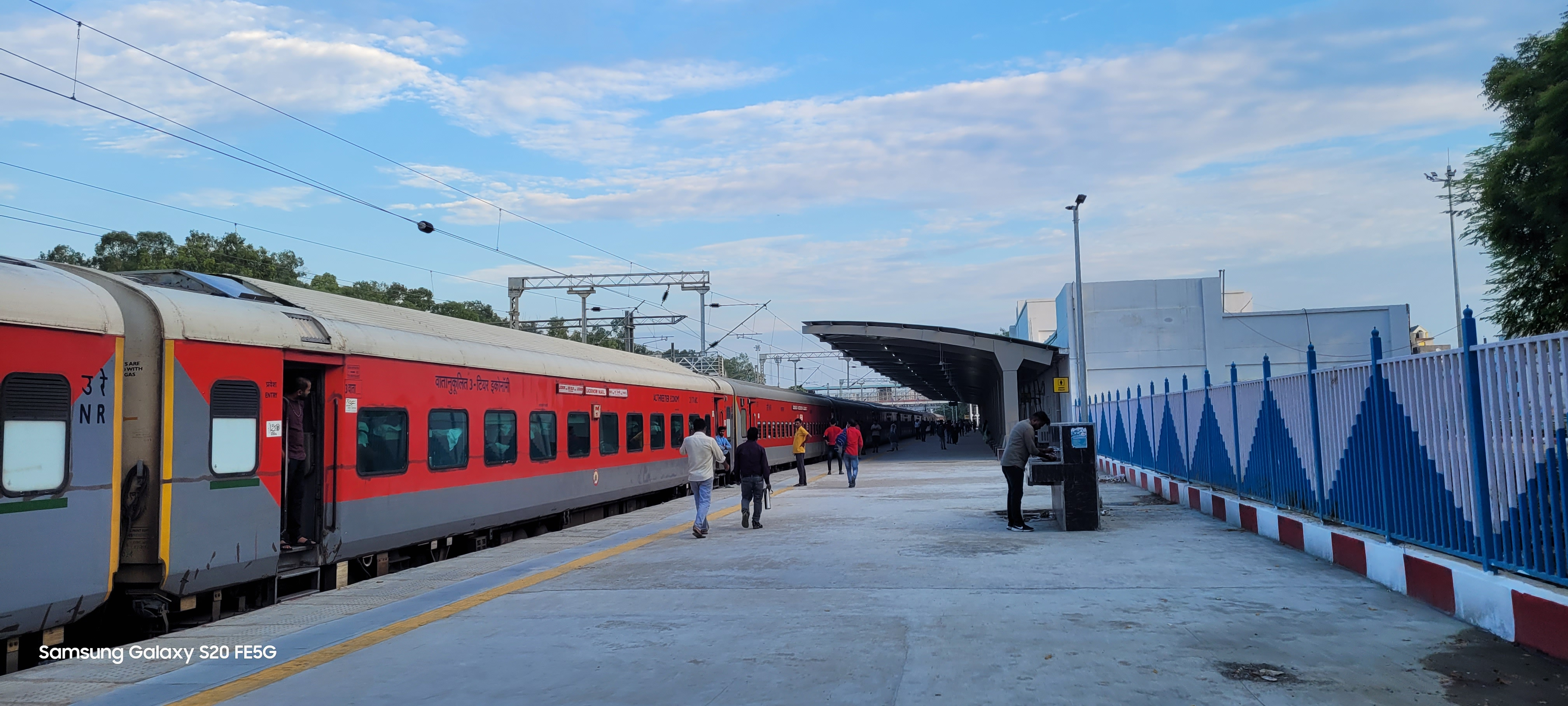
- Lucknow Mail Superfast Express at Alamnagar Railway Station Platform 1

General information
- Location: Alamnagar, Lucknow, Uttar Pradesh 226017; India
- Coordinates: 26.84708°N 80.86031°E
- Elevation: 129 metres (423 ft)
- System: Indian Railways station
- Owner: Indian Railways
- Operator: Northern Railway
- Lines: Lucknow-Moradabad, Alamnagar-Transport Nagar-Utraitia
- Platforms: 5+1(Goods Shed)
- Tracks: 9
- Connections: Alamnagar Railway Station has been developed to act as a satellite station and decongest Lucknow Charbagh railway station

Construction
- Structure type: Standard (on-ground station)
- Parking: Yes
- Cycle facilities: No

Other information
- Status: Double electric line
- Station code: AMG
- Zone(s): Northern Railway
- Division(s): Lucknow NR

History
- Rebuilt: Jan 2023
Location
- Location within India Location within Uttar Pradesh

Alamnagar railway station is a railway station in Lucknow, Uttar Pradesh. Its code is AMG. It serves Rajajipuram, Alamnagar and Buddheshwar areas of Lucknow. The station consists of five platforms. The platforms are well sheltered. It has facilities including water and sanitation. Currently the station is satellite station.

Alamnagar is also a junction station. Lines coming from Moradabad bifurcate here. A set of double electrified lines go towards Lucknow Charbagh NR (LKO) and Lucknow Junction NER (LJN) Stations. Another set of double electrified lines go towards Utraitia Junction (UTR) via Transport Nagar Railway Station (TPNR). This allows trains to skip the highly congested Charbagh Railway Station. These tracks were also strengthened to run trains at speeds upto 100kmph.

== Gallery ==
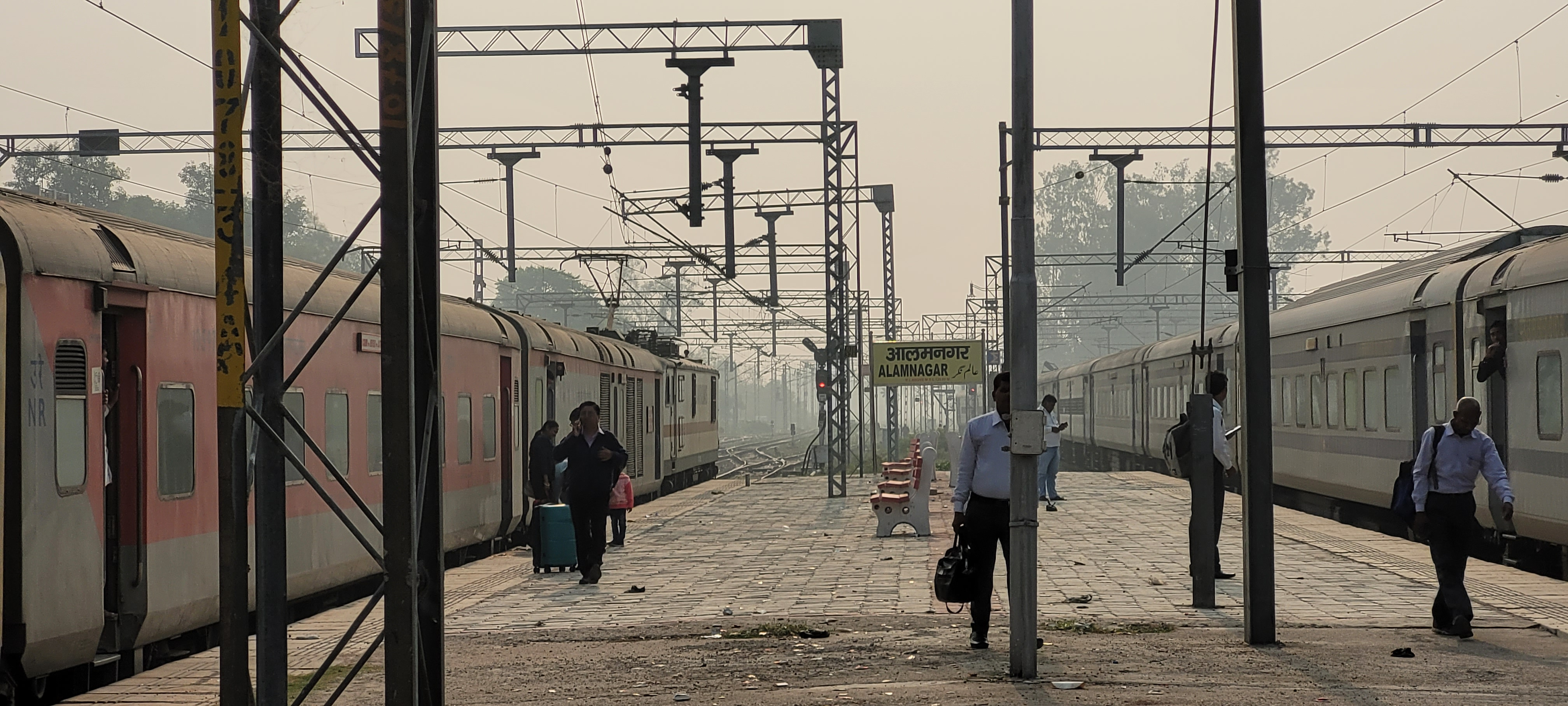
Lucknow AC Superfast Express waiting for departure after unscheduled halt at Alamnagar Railway Station Platform 4 while Shaktinagar-Tanakpur Triveni express skips through Platform 5

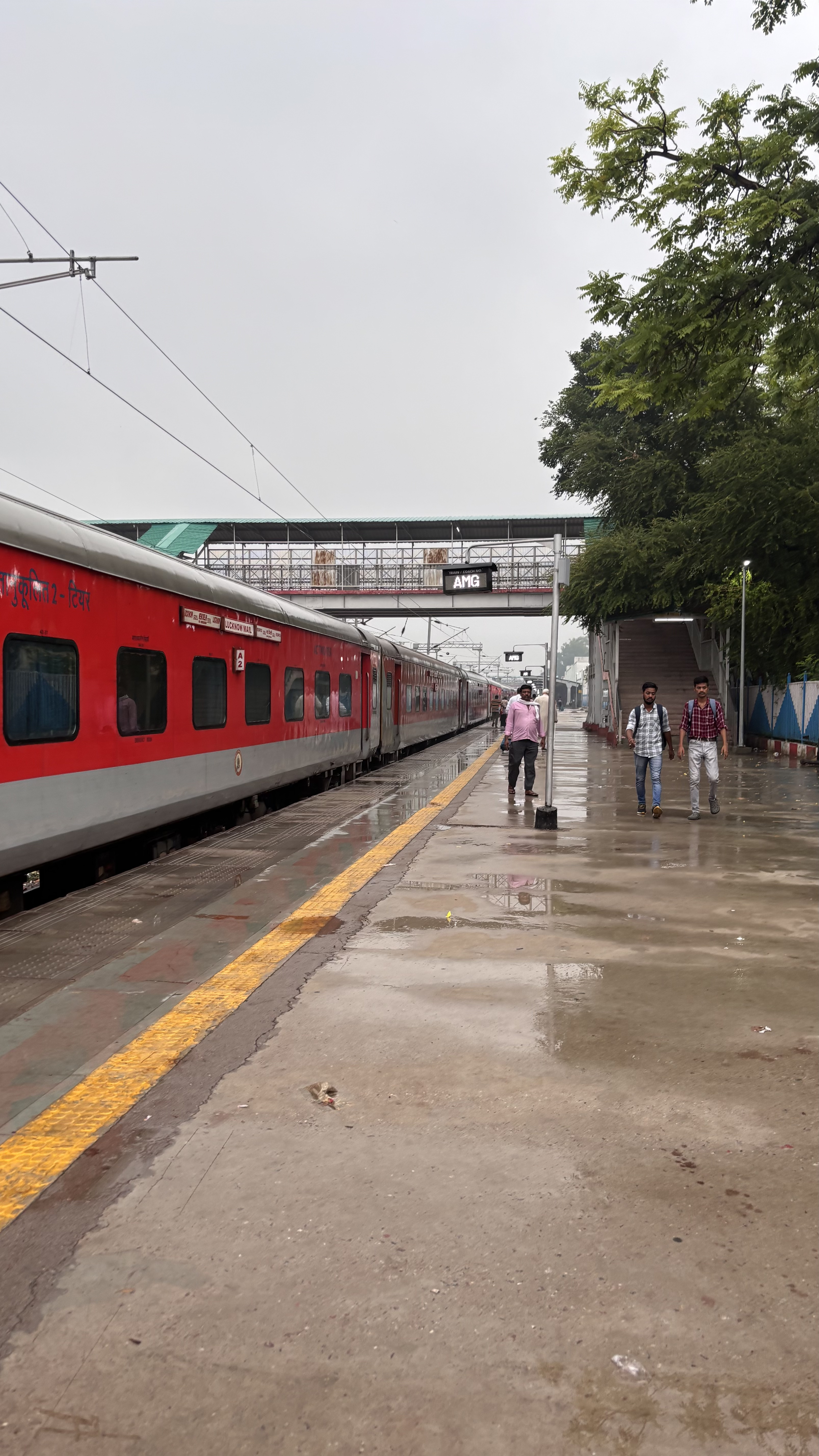
Lucknow Mail Superfast Express arrives at Alamnagar Railway Station for its scheduled halt
