= Anandpur Sahib railway station =

Railway station in Punjab

Anandpur Sahib Railway Station

General information
- Location: SH 25, Rupnagar, Punjab; India
- Coordinates: 31.2299°N 76.5005°E
- Elevation: 297 metres (974 ft)
- System: Indian Railways station
- Owner: Indian Railways
- Operator: Northern Railway
- Line: Sirhind-Una-Mukerian line
- Platforms: 1
- Tracks: 2 (single electrified BG)
- Connections: Auto stand

Construction
- Structure type: Standard (on-ground station)
- Parking: No
- Cycle facilities: No

Other information
- Status: Functioning
- Station code: ANSB
- Zone(s): Northern Railway
- Division(s): Ambala
Location
- Location within Punjab Location within India

Anandpur Sahib Railway Station is a small railway station in Rupnagar district, Punjab. Its code is ANSB. It serves Anandpur Sahib city. The station consists of 1 platform. The platform is not well sheltered. It lacks many facilities including water and sanitation.

== Major trains ==
Some of the important trains that run from Anandpur Sahib are:

- Himachal Express
- Una Jan Shatabdi Express
- Haridwar Una Link Janshatabdi Express (via Chandigarh)
- Hazur Sahib Nanded-Una Himachal Express
- Gurumukhi Superfast Express
- Vande Bharat Express
