= Kalka–Shri Mata Vaishno Devi Katra Express =

Express train in India

Overview
- Service type: Express
- First service: 30 May 2015; 11 years ago
- Current operator: Northern Railways

Route
- Termini: Kalka (KLK); Shri Mata Vaishno Devi Katra (SVDK)
- Stops: 8
- Distance travelled: 479 km (298 mi)
- Average journey time: 9h 35m
- Service frequency: Bi-Weekly (Note: Runs two day in a week for every direction.)
- Train number: 14503 / 14504

On-board services
- Classes: AC 2 tier, AC 3 tier, Sleeper class, General Unreserved
- Seating arrangements: Yes
- Sleeping arrangements: Yes
- Catering facilities: On-board catering E-catering
- Observation facilities: Rake sharing with 22455/22456 Sainagar Shirdi–Kalka Express
- Baggage facilities: No
- Other facilities: Below the seats

Technical
- Rolling stock: ICF coach
- Track gauge: 1,676 mm (5 ft 6 in)
- Operating speed: 50 km/h (31 mph) average including halts

The 14503 / 14504 Kalka–Shri Mata Vaishno Devi Katra Express is an Express train belonging to Northern Railway zone that runs between Kalka and Shri Mata Vaishno Devi Katra in India. It is currently being operated with 14503/14504 train numbers on bi-weekly basis.

== Service ==
The 14503/Kalka–Shri Mata Vaishno Devi Katra Express has an average speed of 50 km/h and covers 479 km in 9h 35m. The 14504/Shri Mata Vaishno Devi Katra–Kalka Express has an average speed of 46 km/h and covers 479 km in 10h 30m.

== Coach composite ==
The train has standard ICF rakes with a maximum speed of 110 km/h. The train consists of 16 coaches :

- 1 AC II Tier
- 2 AC III Tier
- 5 Sleeper Coaches
- 6 General
- 2 Seating cum Luggage Rake

== Route & Halts ==
- Kalka
- Chandigarh
- Mohali
- Ludhiana
- Jalandhar Cantonment
- Pathankot Cantonment
- Jammu Tawi
- Udhampur
- Shri Mata Vaishno Devi Katra

== Traction ==
Both trains are hauled by a Ghaziabad Loco Shed based WAP-7 Electric locomotive from Kalka to Katra and vice versa.

== Rake sharing ==
The train sharing its rake with 22455/22456 Sainagar Shirdi–Kalka Express.

== See also ==
- Kalka railway station
- Shri Mata Vaishno Devi Katra railway station
- Sainagar Shirdi–Kalka Express
