= Faridabad New Town railway station =

Railway station in Haryana, India

Faridabad New Town
- Indian Railways logo

General information
- Location: Bata Flyover, New Industrial Township, Faridabad, Haryana; India
- Coordinates: 28°22′35″N 77°18′35″E
- Elevation: 204 metres (669 ft)
- System: Indian Railways station
- Owner: Indian Railways
- Operator: Northern Railways
- Line: Agra–Delhi chord
- Platforms: 3
- Tracks: 4

Construction
- Structure type: Standard on ground
- Parking: No
- Cycle facilities: No

Other information
- Status: Functioning
- Station code: FDN
- Zone(s): Northern Railway zone
- Division(s): Delhi

History
- Electrified: 1982–85

Services
Preceding station	Indian Railways	Following station
Ballabhgarh towards ?	Northern Railway zone Agra–Delhi chord	Faridabad towards ?
Location
- Location within Haryana Location within India

Faridabad New Town Railway Station is on the Agra–Delhi chord. It is located in Faridabad district in the Indian state of Haryana. It serves Faridabad and surrounding areas.

== History ==
In 1904, The Agra–Delhi chord was completed. Some parts of it were relaid during the construction of New Delhi (inaugurated in 1927–28).

In 1982–85, Faridabad–Mathura–Agra section was electrified.

== Train service ==
=== Passengers ===
As of 2013, Faridabad New Town railway station handles around 129,000 long distance and suburban Delhi NCR passengers every day.

=== Suburban railway ===
Faridabad New Town is part of the Delhi Suburban Railway and is served by EMU trains.

== See also ==
- Transport in Delhi
- Faridabad railway station
