= Khatauli railway station =

Railway station in Uttar Pradesh, India

- Indian Railways logo

General information
- Location: SH 51, Khatauli, Muzaffarnagar district, Uttar Pradesh; India
- Coordinates: 29.2737°N 77.7370°E
- Elevation: 242 metres (794 ft)
- System: Indian Railways station
- Owner: Indian Railways
- Operator: Northern Railway
- Line: Delhi–Meerut–Saharanpur line
- Platforms: 2
- Tracks: 4
- Connections: National Highway 58

Construction
- Structure type: Standard (on-ground station)
- Parking: Yes
- Cycle facilities: No

Other information
- Status: Electric double line
- Station code: KAT
- Zone(s): Northern Railway
- Division(s): Delhi

History
- Rebuilt: 2018
Route map
Location
- Location within India Location within Uttar Pradesh

Khatauli railway station is a railway station in Khatauli, a tehsil of Muzaffarnagar district, Uttar Pradesh. Its code is KAT. Twenty-seven trains per day stop at Khatauli station. Of these, 12 are express trains, 9 are passenger trains, and 6 are MEMUs. Some notable trains are Nauchandi Express (Prayagraj–Saharanpur), Yoga Express (Ahmedabad–Haridwar), Bandra Terminus–Dehradun Express, Shalimar Express (Jammu Tawi–Old Delhi), Delhi–Ambala Cantonment Intercity Express, and Chhattisgarh Express. The station consists of two well-sheltered platforms. It has many facilities including water and sanitation.

On 19 August 2017 the Kalinga Utkal Express derailed near the station at around 5:46 pm. About 23 people were killed and more than 100 injured in the incident.
