= Narela railway station =

Railway station in Delhi, India

Narela

General information
- Location: Narela, North West Delhi district India
- Coordinates: 28.8465°N 77.0855°E
- Elevation: 220 m (722 ft)
- System: Indian Railway and Delhi Suburban Railway station
- Owner: Indian Railways
- Operator: Delhi railway division
- Line: Northern Railways' Ambala–Delhi rail route
- Platforms: 2 BG
- Tracks: 5 BG
- Connections: Taxi stand, auto stand

Construction
- Structure type: Standard (on-ground station)
- Parking: Available
- Cycle facilities: Not available
- Accessible: Disabled access

Other information
- Station code: NUR
- Fare zone: Northern Railways

History
- Opened: 1890
- Rebuilt: 2016

Services
Preceding station	Indian Railways	Following station
Holambi kalan towards ?	Northern Railway zone Northern Railways' Ambala–Delhi rail route	Rathdhana towards ?
Location
- Location within India Location within Haryana

Narela railway station (code is NUR) is a railway station on Ambala–Delhi rail route in Narela which is a residential and commercial neighborhood of the North West Delhi district of Delhiin India.

== History ==
In 1890, the station was built on Northern Railways' Ambala–Delhi rail line.

As of 2025-26, Narela station underwent upgrade with additional platform shelters, better waiting halls, toilets, and free Wi-Fi.

== Trains ==
The following trains run from Narela railway station:

- Farakka Express (via Sultanpur)
- Lokmanya Tilak Terminus–Amritsar Express
- Sahibabad ←→ Sonipat MEMU
- Delhi–Fazilka InterCity Express
- Delhi–Kalka Passenger (unreserved)
- Delhi ←→ Panipat MEMU
- Ghaziabad ←→ Panipat MEMU
- Himachal Express
- Jammu Mail
- Jhelum Express
- New Delhi ←→ Kurukshetra MEMU
- Panipat ←→ Delhi MEMU
- Kurukshetra ←→ Hazrat Nizamuddin MEMU
- Unchahar Express

== Facilities ==
The station has two platforms, shelters, water and public convenience facilities, book stall and refreshment stall.

== See also ==
Delhi travel guide from Wikivoyage

- Hazrat Nizamuddin railway station
- New Delhi railway station
- Delhi Junction railway station
- Anand Vihar Terminal railway station
- Delhi Sarai Rohilla railway station
- Delhi Metro
