= Jodhpur State Railway =

British Indian railway company

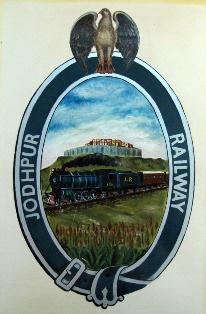

Overview
- Headquarters: Jodhpur
- Locale: Jodhpur State, British India
- Dates of operation: 1924–1952

Technical
- Track gauge: 1,000 mm (3 ft 3 3/8 in)
- Length: approx 1,050 miles (1,690 km)

The Jodhpur State Railway (JSR) was formed in 1924 and took over responsibility for working the Jodhpur section of the Jodhpur–Bikaner Railway, and the British section of the Jodhpur-Hyderabad Railway.

== History ==
=== Predecessors ===
Earlier named the Jodhpur Railway the first section opened as a metre gauge line in 1882, later becoming the Jodhpur–Bikaner Railway (JBR) in 1889. In 1908 the JBR operated 828 miles (1,333 km) in the territories of Sind (under British control) and the States of Jodhpur and Bikaner. By 1918 the ‘JBR System’ had expanded to 1,355 miles (2,181 km), 1,106 miles (1,780 km) of its own track and 249 miles (401 km) which the JBR operated under agreements with other railways. A further 210 miles (340 km) were sanctioned or under construction by JBR in 1918.

=== Creation of the Jodhpur State Railway ===
In 1924, the JBR was divided into two new systems, the Jodhpur State Railway (JSR) and Bikaner State Railway (BSR) formed to take over responsibility for working the railway. The JSR taking the Jodhpur Section of the Jodhpur–Bikaner Railway, together with the Jodhpur-Hyderabad Railway (British Section). The exact mileage comprising the Jodhpur section is not known but in 1918 it was 687 miles (1,106 km) plus 124 miles (200 km) of the Jodhpur-Hyderabad Railway (British Section).

Writing critically in 1929 about third class travelling, Mahatma Gandhi condemned the latrines in JSR carriages as being "absolutely intolerable, insanitary and unfit for human use. The State railways should really be a model to the British system; whereas the actual state of things is the other way."

In 1936-37, the route mileage for the JSR had expanded to 767 miles (1,234 km). They were also operating the British section of the Jodhpur–Hyderabad Railway (British Section), expanded to 239 miles (385 km) and also the 49 miles (79 km) long Mirpur Khas–Khadro Railway. All these were metre gauge lines.

In 1947, the British section of the Jodhpur-Hyderabad Railway and the western portions of Jodhpur State Railway and Bikaner State Railway was ceded to the government of Pakistan becoming part of Pakistan Railways. The remaining portions of the Jodhpur State Railway and the Bikaner State Railway became part of the Northern Division of Indian Railways in 1952.

=== Rolling stock ===
In 1936, the company owned 107 locomotives, 243 coaches and 2611 goods wagons.

=== Classification ===
It was labeled as a Class I railway according to Indian Railway Classification System of 1926.

=== Conversion to broad gauge ===
The network was converted to 1,676 mm (5 ft 6 in) 5 ft 6 in (1,676 mm) broad gauge progressively in 2000s and 2010s.
