= Jodhpur–Bikaner Railway =

Jodhpur-Bikaner Railway
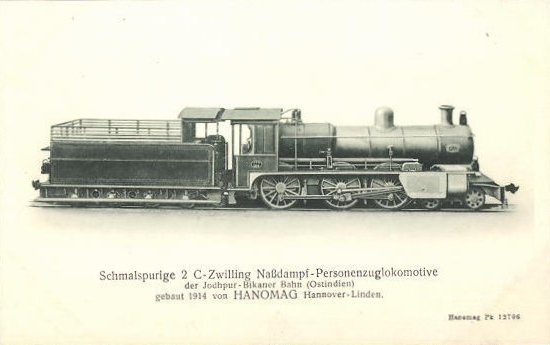
- Industry: Railways
- Defunct: 1924
- Headquarters: Jodhpur, Bikaner, British India
- Area served: Jodhpur State & Bikaner State
- Services: Rail transport

The Jodhpur–Bikaner Railway (JBR) was a 1,000 mm (3 ft 3 3/8 in) metre gauge railway, jointly owned and operated by the Jodhpur State and Bikaner State until 1924 when the system was split between the newly formed Jodhpur State Railway and Bikaner State Railway.

== History ==
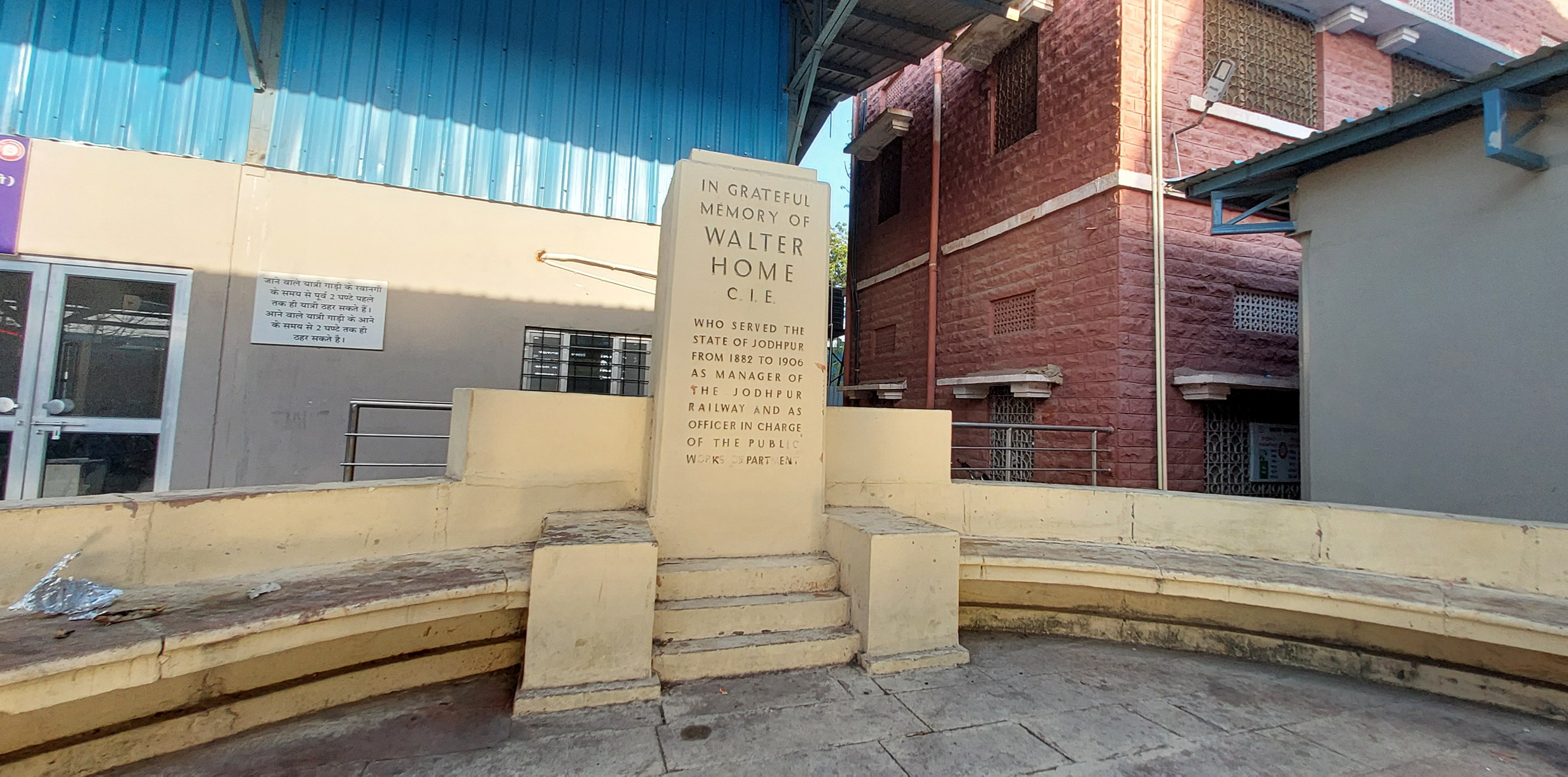
Memorial of Walter Home, creator of Jodhpur-Bikaner railways

The JBR had its beginnings as the Jodhpur Railway with the decision by Maharaja Jaswant Singh, to build a railway line from Bitoora to his capital city Jodhpur. Douglas Joscelyne, a British executive engineer, was posted from the Public Works Department to Rajputana for this work. The construction on metre gauge Bitoora–Pali section was commenced on 16 February 1881 and was completed on 28 February 1882. Bitoora became known as Marwar Junction with a connection to Bombay, Baroda and Central India Railway (BB&CIR) Rajputana Section between Ajmer and Palanpur that had opened in 1881.

Walter Home, who succeeded Joscelyne in April 1882, was deployed from the Public Works Department Railways Branch and appointed as Manager for the construction of the Jodhpur Railway and also in-charge of the Marwar State Public Works Department. He built the Jodhpur Railway over the ensuing 25 years. The first section of Jodhpur Railway from Marwar Junction to Pali was opened for traffic in 1882, extended Luni 1884 and reached Jodhpur in 1885 railways.

In 1887, a proposal was put forward for linking up Jodhpur with other important towns of the State like Nagaur and Makrana and with a possible rail link to Bikaner. Both of these were given due consideration in forming the expansion proposals of Jodhpur Railway. The outcome were agreements dated 13 and 30 July 1889, between the British Government, Maharaja of Jodhpur and Maharaja of Bikaner for the construction of a railway from Jodhpur to Bikaner. This agreement of 1889 was unique, in that, it was first of its kind in which two native rulers decided to co-operate and invest in an enterprise for the benefit of both and public at large. The title of Jodhpur Railway was then changed to Jodhpur Bikaner Railway (JBR). Walter Home, now the manager of JBR was promoted and placed in the list of superintending engineers.

In 1891, rapid progress was made in constructing the railway from Jodhpur to Bikaner, later extended to Bhatinda (1901-1902) where the JBR connected with the metre gauge section of the Bombay, Baroda and Central India Railway, and the Broad Gauge(BG) North Western and the Southern Punjab Railways. By 1906 the JBR was having operations over 828 miles in the territories of Sind (under British control) and in territories of the States of Jodhpur and Bikaner. In October 1906, Walter Home resigned. In 1911, the company owned 64 locomotives, 324 coaches and 1342 goods wagons.

In 1924, the JBR was split into its two constituent parts, with two new systems, the Jodhpur and Bikaner State Railways, formed to work the lines.

== Network ==
Jodhpur Section — 1918 grand total, 687 miles(1105 km).

- Main Line, MG, 342 miles(550 km)
  - Kuchman Road-Jodhpur, opened 1891-93, 137 miles
  - Jodhpur- Luni Junction, opened 1885, 20 miles
  - Luni Junction-Balotra, opened 1887, 50 miles
  - Balotra-Barmer, opened 1899, 60 miles
  - Barmer-Marwar Frontier, opened 1900, 74 miles
- Pachpadra Branch Line, MG, 10 miles(16 km)
  - Balotra-Pachpadra, opened 1887, 10 miles
- Marwar Junction Extension Line, MG, 44 miles(71 km)
  - Luni Junction-Marwar Pali, opened 1884, 25 miles
  - Maewar Pali-Marwar Junction, opened 1882, 19 miles
- Phalodi Branch Line, MG, 79 miles(127 km)
  - Jodhpur-Osian, opened 1913, 34 miles
  - Osian-Phalodi, opened 1914, 45 miles
- Merta City Branch Line, MG, 19 miles(31 km)
  - Merta Road-Merta City, opened 1905, 19 miles
- Bhagu Extension Line, MG, 59 miles(95 km)
  - Merta Road-Nagaur, opened 1891, 35 miles
  - Nagaur-Bhagu, opened 1891, 24 miles
- Marwar Frontier Line, MG, 61 miles(98 km)
  - Degana-Marwar Frontier, opened 1909, 61 miles
- Ladna Extension Line, MG, 5 miles(8 km)
  - Jaswantgarg-Ladna, opened 2015, 5 miles
- Sanderao Extension Line, MG, 78 miles(125 km)
  - Marwar Junction-Sanderao, sanctioned for construction 1914, 78 miles

Bikaner Section — 1918 grand total, 630 miles(1013 km).

- Main Line, MG, 249 miles(401 km)
  - Bhagu(Marwar Frontier)-Bikaner, opened 1891, 48 miles
  - Bikaner-Dumera, opened 1898, 42 miles
  - Dulmera-Suratgarh, opened 1901,71 miles
  - Suratgarh-Bhatinda, opened 1902, 88 miles
- Hisar Extension Line, MG, 136 miles(219 km)
  - Marwar Frontier to Ratangarh, opened 1909-10, 30 miles
  - Ratangarh-Churu, opened 1910, 26 miles
  - Churu-Hisar, opened 1911, 80 miles
- Bikaner-Ratangarh Chord Line, MG, 85 miles(137 km)
  - Bikaner-Ratangarh, opened 1912, 85 miles
- Sardarshahr Extension Line, MG, 27 miles(43 km)
  - Hudera(2 miles from Ratangarh)- Sardarshahr, opened 1916, 27 miles
- Hanumangarh-Sadupur Line, MG, 105 miles(169 km)
  - Hanumangarh-Sadupur, sanctioned for construction 1915, 105 miles
- Bikaner-Kolayat Line, MG, 27 miles(43 km)
  - Bikaner-Kolayat, sanctioned for construction 1915, 27 miles

Other lines

Jodhpur–Hyderabad Railway (British Section) MG, 1918 grand total, 124 miles(200 km).

- Hyderabad-Shadipali, opened 1892 as a broad gauge line; converted to MG in 1901, 56 miles. The section extended eastward from Shadalpi as far as Umarkot and was also known as the Hyderabad-Umarkot Railway.
- Shadipali-Jodhpur Frontier, opened 1900, 68 miles.

Mirpur Khas–Jhudo Railway, MG, 50 miles(80 km). Owned, managed and maintained by JBR, worked as part of the JBR network

- Jamro Junction-Jhudo, opened 1909, 50 miles.

Mirpur Khas–Khadro Railway, MG, 49 miles(79 km). Owned, managed and maintained by JBR, worked as part of the JBR network.

- Mirpur Khas-Khadro, opened 1912, 49 miles.

Pipar Road–Ravi Light Railway, 2 ft/610mm narrow gauge(NG), 25 miles(40 km). Constructed as a steam tramway and initially worked by Jodhpur Durbar, taken over by JBR

- Pipar Road-Bhavi, opened 1910, 19 miles
- Bhavi-Bilara, opened 1912, 6 miles

== Conversion to broad gauge ==
The network was converted to 5 ft 6 in (1,676 mm) broad gauge progressively in 2000s and 2010s.
