= Bikaner State Railway =

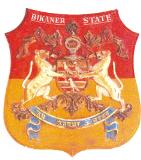
- Industry: Railways
- Founded: 1924
- Defunct: 1952
- Headquarters: Bikaner, British India
- Area served: Bikaner State
- Services: Rail transport

The Bikaner State Railway (BkSR) was formed in 1924 and took over responsibility for working the Bikaner section of the Jodhpur–Bikaner Railway.

== History ==
Earlier named the Jodhpur Railway the first section opened as a metre gauge line in 1882, later becoming the Jodhpur–Bikaner Railway (JBR) in 1889. In 1908 the JBR operated 828 miles (1,333 km) in the territories of Sind (under British control) and in territories of the States of Jodhpur and Bikaner. By 1918 the ‘JBR System’ had expanded to 1,355 miles (2,181 km), which comprised 1,106 miles (1,780 km) plus a further 249 miles (401 km) which JBR was working and operating under agreements with other railways. A further 210 miles (340 km) were sanctioned or under construction by JBR in 1918.

In 1924, the JBR was divided into its two constituent parts, with two new systems, the Jodhpur State Railway (JSR) and Bikaner State Railway (BkSR) formed to take over responsibility for working the railway. The exact mileage of BkSR comprising the "Bikaner Section" of JBR is not known but in 1918 it was 630 miles (1,010 km). In 1936-37 the route mileage for the BkSR had expanded to 796 miles (1,281 km) of metre gauge lines. By 1943 the BkSR was operating a network of 883 miles (1,421 km)

In 1947, the British section of the Jodhpur-Hyderabad Railway and the western portions of Jodhpur State Railway and Bikaner State Railway was ceded to the government of Pakistan becoming part of Pakistan Railways. The remaining portions of the Jodhpur State Railway and Bikaner State Railway became part of the Northern Division of Indian Railways in 1952.

== Rolling stock ==
In 1936, the company owned 54 locomotives, 187 coaches and 325 goods wagons.

== Classification ==
It was labeled as a Class II railway according to Indian Railway Classification System of 1926. Later, it was classified as Class I.

== Conversion to broad gauge ==
The network was converted to 1,676 mm (5 ft 6 in) broad gauge progressively in the 2000s and 2010s.
