= Faridabad railway station =

Railway station in Haryana, India

Faridabad
- Indian Railway logo

General information
- Location: Sector 20A, Old Faridabad, Faridabad, Haryana; India
- Coordinates: 28°24′38″N 77°18′27″E
- Elevation: 206 metres (676 ft)
- System: Indian Railways station
- Owner: Ministry of Railways (India)
- Operator: Indian Railways
- Lines: New Delhi–Mumbai main line, New Delhi–Agra chord
- Platforms: 7 (1A, 1B, 1, 2, 3, 4, 5)
- Tracks: 9
- Connections: Violet Line Old Faridabad

Construction
- Structure type: At grade
- Parking: No
- Cycle facilities: No

Other information
- Status: Functioning
- Station code: FDB
- Zone(s): Northern Railway
- Division(s): Delhi

History
- Opened: 1904
- Electrified: 1982–85

Services
| Preceding station | Indian Railways | Following station |
|---|---|---|
| Faridabad New Town towards ? | Northern Railway zone Agra–Delhi chord | Tughlakabad towards ? |
Location
- Location within Haryana Location within India

Faridabad Railway Station (station code: FDB) is located in Faridabad city of Faridabad district in Haryana state of India.

== History ==
In 1904, the Agra–Delhi line was completed. Some parts of it were relaid during the construction of New Delhi (inaugurated in 1927–28).

In 1982-85, Faridabad–Mathura–Agra line was electrified.

In 2025-26, Faridabad station underwent ₹261.97 crore airport-style redevelopment with two new iconic station buildings, separate departure and arrival areas, a wide concourse with waiting lounges, food courts, shopping facilities, multi-level car parking on both sides with a capacity for hundreds of vehicles, and two 12-meter-wide foot overbridges to ease traffic flow.

== Train service ==
=== Amenities ===
Faridabad railway station has telephone booth, computerized booking office, waiting room, and refreshment room. Distance from Faridabad railway station: Delhi–Haryana Badarpur border 10.2 km, Mehrauli 23.6 km, and India Gate 27 km.

=== Rail line ===
Station is on the Agra–Delhi line.

=== Trains ===
Faridabad has several long distance as well as Delhi Suburban Railway (served by EMU) trains.

== See also ==
- Faridabad New Town railway station
- Transport in Delhi
