= Sainagar Shirdi–Kalka Express =

Passenger train in India

Sainagar Shirdi–Kalka Superfast Express
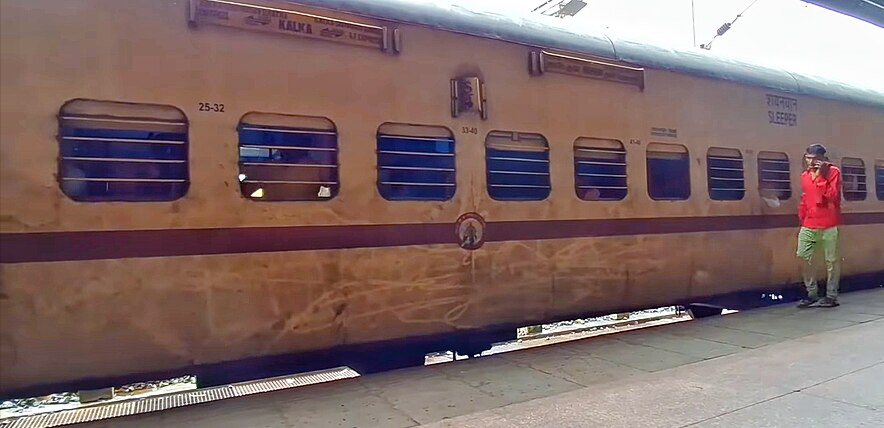
- Sainagar Shirdi–Kalka Superfast Express At Itarsi Junction railway station

Overview
- Service type: Express
- Locale: Maharashtra, Madhya Pradesh, Uttar Pradesh, Delhi & Haryana
- First service: 8 October 2013; 12 years ago
- Current operator: Northern Railways

Route
- Termini: Sainagar Shirdi (SNSI); Kalka (KLK)
- Stops: 23
- Distance travelled: 1,637 km (1,017 mi)
- Average journey time: 27 hours 12 mins
- Service frequency: Bi-weekly
- Train number: 22455 / 22456

On-board services
- Classes: AC 2 Tier, AC 3 Tier, Sleeper Class, General Unreserved
- Seating arrangements: Yes
- Sleeping arrangements: Yes
- Catering facilities: On-board catering E-catering
- Observation facilities: Rake sharing with 14503/14504 Kalka–Shri Mata Vaishno Devi Katra Express
- Baggage facilities: Available

Technical
- Rolling stock: ICF coach
- Track gauge: 1,676 mm (5 ft 6 in)
- Operating speed: 62 km/h (39 mph) average including halts

The 22455 / 22456 Sainagar Shirdi–Kalka Superfast Express is an express train belonging to Indian Railways Northern Railway zone that run between Sainagar Shirdi and Kalka in India.

== Service ==
It operates as train number 22455 from Sainagar Shirdi to Kalka and as train number 22456 in the reverse direction, serving the states of Maharashtra, Madhya Pradesh, Uttar Pradesh, Delhi, Haryana and Chandigarh. The train covers the distance of 1,637 km (1,017 mi) in 27 hours 12 mins approximately at a speed of 61 km/h (38 mph).

== Schedule ==
Train number	Station code	Departure station	Departure time	Departure day	Arrival station	Arrival time	Arrival day
22455	SNSI	Sainagar Shirdi	10:00 AM	TUE SAT	Kalka	12:20 PM	WED SUN
22456	KLK	Kalka	7:00 PM	SUN THU	Sainagar Shirdi	10:15 PM	MON FRI

== Coach composition ==
- 1 AC II Tier
- 2 AC III Tier
- 5 Sleeper Coaches
- 6 General
- 2 Second-class Luggage/parcel van

Loco	1	2	3	4	5	6	7	8	9	10	11	12	13	14	15	16
	SLR	GEN	GEN	GEN	S1	S2	S3	S4	S5	B1	B2	A1	GEN	GEN	GEN	SLR

As with most train services in India, coach composition may be amended at the discretion of Indian Railways depending on demand.

== Routeing ==
The train runs from Sainagar Shirdi via Kopargaon, Manmad Junction, Bhusaval Junction, Khandwa Junction, Itarsi Junction, Bhopal Junction, Jhansi Junction, Gwalior, Agra Cantonment, Hazrat Nizamuddin, New Delhi, Panipat, Ambala Cantonment, Chandigarh Junction to Kalka.

== Traction ==
earlier was Itarsi-based WDM-3D. The train is hauled by a Ghaziabad-based WAP-7 or WAP-5 locomotive from end to end.

== Rake sharing ==
The train sharing its rake with 14503/14504 Kalka–Shri Mata Vaishno Devi Katra Express.
