= Makrouli =

- Country: India
- State: Haryana

Population (2011)
  - Total: 8,346

Makrauli is the first village on Rohtak-Gohana-Panipat highway in the Indian state of Haryana. The village is composed of two adjacent small villages, Makrauli Khurd and Makrauli Kalan.

== Demographics ==
According to the 2011 census of India, Makrouli Khurd had a population of 2828 in 476 households. Males (1506) constitute 53.25% of the population and females (1322) 46.74%. Makrouli Khurd has an average literacy (2076) rate of 73.4%, more than the national average of 73.4%: male literacy (1183) is 56.98%, and female literacy (893) is 43.01% of total literates (2076). In Makrouli Khurd, 11.88% of the population is under 6 years of age (336).

Poonia and bazzad are the main jat gotra of Makrauli khurd.

Nearby villages are Dhammar, Kiloi, Basantpur, Chamaria, Ladhout-Bhaiyapur, Bohar.

== Education ==
A Government Senior Secondary School (GSSS) is near the village pond.

== Culture ==
The village has a temple, small mandi and housing projects.

== Economy ==
Axis Bank has a branch there.

== Transport ==
The village is near Rohtak-Gohana toll road. It is 220 km away from Chandigarh, 56 km from Delhi and 5 km from Rohtak.
