= Sonipat Junction railway station =

Railway station in Haryana, India

Sonipat Junction
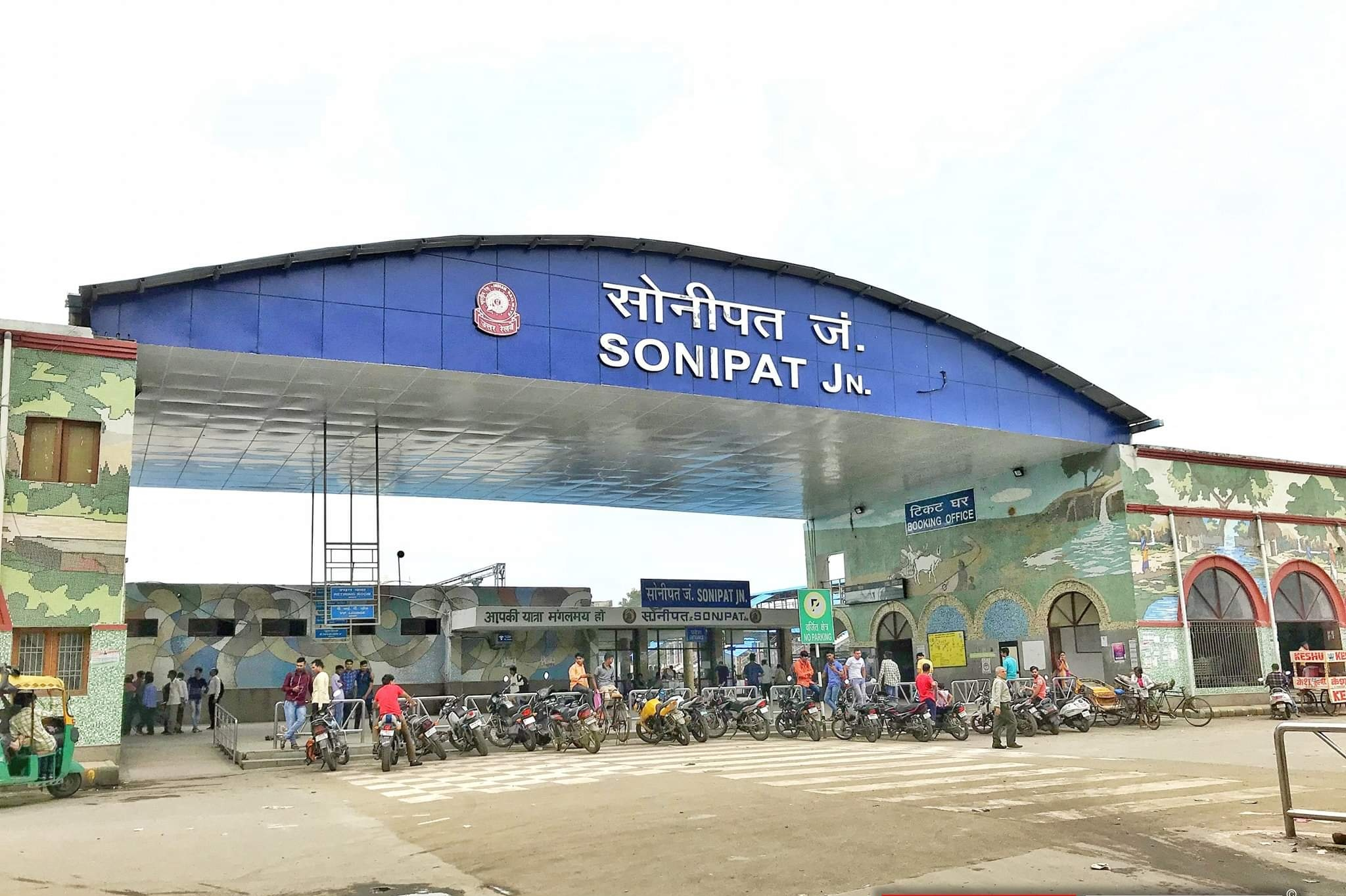

General information
- Location: Aggarsain Nagar, Sonipat; India
- Coordinates: 28.9898°N 77.0171°E
- Elevation: 235 m (771 ft)
- System: Indian Railway and Delhi Suburban Railway station
- Owner: Ministry of Railways (India)
- Operator: Indian Railways
- Lines: Delhi–Kalka line, Sonipat–Jind line
- Platforms: 5
- Tracks: 6 ( Broad Gauge)

Construction
- Structure type: At grade

Other information
- Station code: SNP
- Zone(s): Northern Railway
- Division(s): Delhi
Location

Sonipat Junction railway station is located in Sonipat district in the Indian state of Haryana. It is a major junction in Delhi NCR. Its station code is SNP.

It is also connected to Gohana and Jind via regular rail links.

There is also a proposal connecting Palwal directly from Sonepat. Haryana government has given approval to connect Harsana Kala to Palwal railway station. This will directly connect North Haryana to Southern Haryana. To reduce Delhi's rail traffic, a bypass project will run along the KMP Expressway.
