= Laksar–Dehradun line =

Railway route

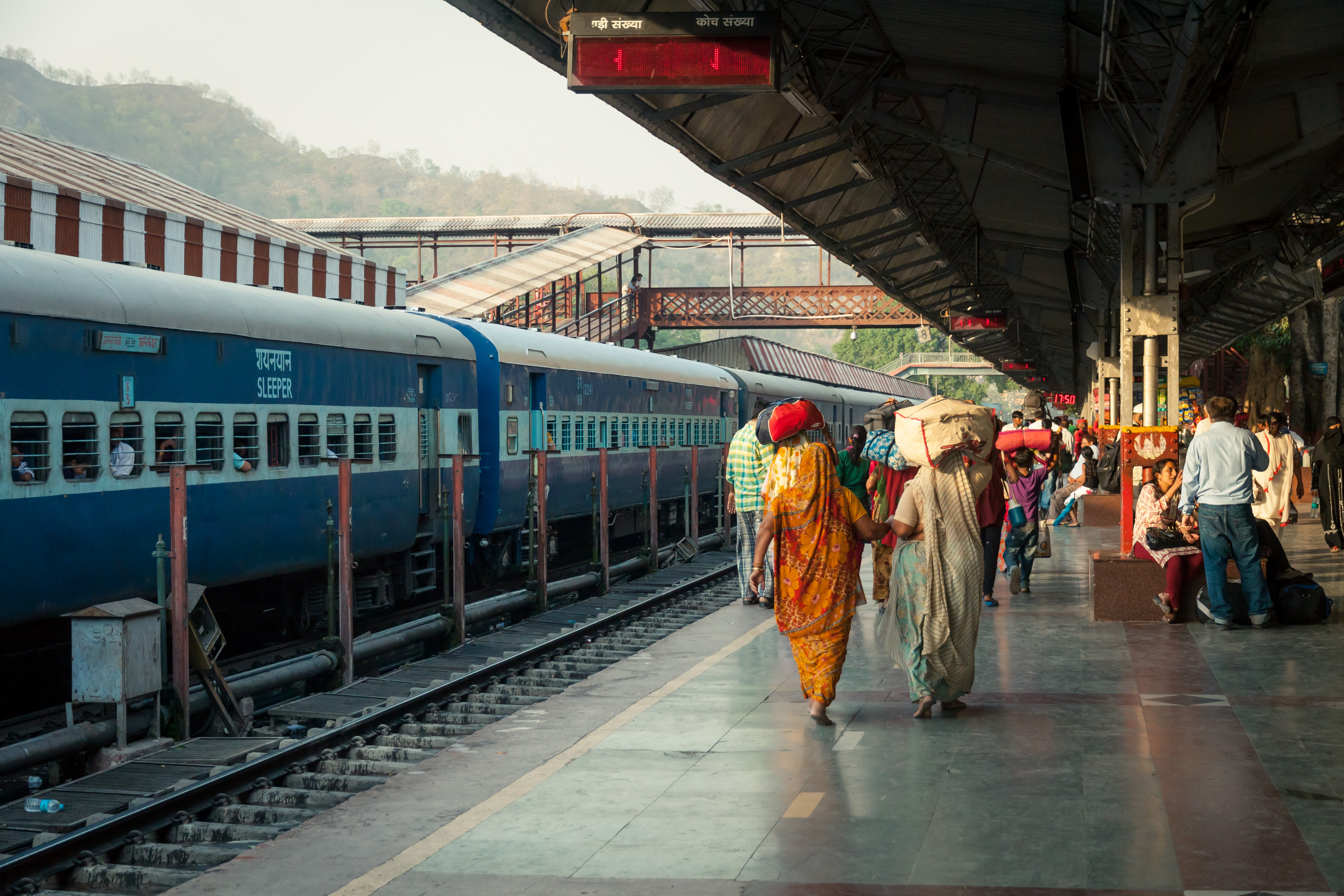
- Haridwar Junction is an important railway station on Laksar-Dehradun line

Overview
- Status: Operational
- Owner: Indian Railways
- Locale: Uttarakhand
- Termini: Laksar Junction; Dehradun

Service
- Operator: Northern Railway

History
- Opened: 13 March 1900 (Main line); 2 April 1927 (Rishikesh branch)

Technical
- Line length: Main line 79 km (49 mi); Raiwala–Rishikesh branch line 12 km (7 mi)
- Track gauge: 1,676 mm (5 ft 6 in) Broad Gauge
- Electrification: Yes
- Operating speed: 100 km/h

The Laksar–Dehradun line is a railway route on the Northern Railway zone of Indian Railways. This route plays an important role in rail transportation of Garhwal division of Uttarakhand state.

The corridor passes through the hilly areas of Uttarakhand. Some portions are near the bank of Ganges with a stretch of 79 km which connects Laksar Junction situates on Moradabad–Ambala line and Dehradun. It has a branch line which starts from Raiwala Junction and ends at Rishikesh with a stretch of 12 km.

== Speed Limit ==
Laksar-Dehradun line is classified as a "Group D" line and can take speeds up to 100 km/h. and Raiwala-Rishikesh branch line is classified as a "Group D" line and can take speeds up to 100 km/h but Haridwar to Dehradun is PSR caution of 50 kmph so the train can not attain max speed.

== History ==
The main railway line from Laksar Junction to Dehradun via Raiwala Junction was originally built by Oudh and Rohilkhand Railway of United Provinces of Agra and Oudh portion as 5 ft 6 in (1,676 mm) broad gauge was constructed on different phases.

- The first phase, from Laksar Junction to Jwalapur was opened on 1 January 1886.
- The second phase, from Jwalapur to Haridwar was opened on 20 August 1886.
- The third phase, from Haridwar to Dehradun was sanctioned on 18 November 1896 and opened on 1 March 1900.

Whereas, the branch line between Raiwala Junction railway station and Rishikesh railway station which were comes under the East Indian Railway Garhwal district portion was opened on 2 April 1927. And the extension of the line to Karnaprayag by Rishikesh–Karnaprayag line, the Yog Nagari Rishikesh railway station was inaugurated on 12 January 2021.

== Electrification ==
The electrification was done on dividing the three sections of this route, the first section is Laksar Junction–Haridwar, the second section is Haridwar–Dehradun and the third section is Raiwala–Rishikesh branch. The First section is electrified on 28 September 2015. The second section is electrified on 20 October 2016. And the third section was opened on 2018.

== Trains Passing through this line ==
=== Main ===
- Kathgodam–Dehradun Express
- Nanda Devi AC Express
- Mussoorie Express
- Dehradun–Amritsar Express
- Naini Doon Jan Shatabdi Express
- Dehradun Jan Shatabdi Express
- Dehradun Shatabdi Express
- Rapti Ganga Express
- Bandra Terminus–Dehradun Express
- Upasana Express
- Indore–Dehradun Express
- Ujjaini Express
- Uttaranchal Express
- Dehradun Banaras Express
- Anand Vihar Terminal - Dehradun Vande Bharat Express

=== Branch ===
- Kalinga Utkal Express
- Yoga Express
- Yog Nagari Rishikesh–Prayagraj Sangam Express
- Yog Nagari Rishikesh–Jammu Tawi Express
- Udaipur City–Yog Nagari Rishikesh Express
- Doon Express
- Kochuveli–Yog Nagari Rishikesh Superfast Express
- Hemkunt Express
