= Dehradun Shatabdi Express =

Shatabdi Express train in India

Overview
- Service type: Shatabdi Express
- Locale: Delhi, Uttar Pradesh, Uttarakhand
- First service: 26 January 1995; 31 years ago
- Current operator: Northern Railways

Route
- Termini: New Delhi; Dehradun
- Stops: 8
- Distance travelled: 314 km (195 mi)
- Average journey time: 6 hours 10 minutes as 12017; 5 hours 55 minutes as 12018
- Service frequency: Daily
- Train number: 12017 / 12018
- Lines used: Delhi–Meerut–Saharanpur line; Saharanpur–Laksar line; Laksar–Dehradun line

On-board services
- Classes: Executive Chair Car, AC Chair Car
- Seating arrangements: Yes
- Sleeping arrangements: No
- Catering facilities: Yes
- Observation facilities: Large windows
- Entertainment facilities: No
- Baggage facilities: Overhead racks

Technical
- Rolling stock: LHB rakes
- Track gauge: 1,676 mm (5 ft 6 in)
- Electrification: Yes
- Operating speed: 110 km/h (70 mph) maximum 52.36 km/h (32.53 mph), including halts

The Dehradun Shatabdi Express is an Express train of Shatabdi class belonging to Indian Railways that runs between New Delhi and Dehradun in India. It runs 7 days in a week. It operates as train number 12017 from New Delhi to Dehradun and as train number 12018 in the reverse direction. Dehradun Shatabdi Express is part of series of Shatabdi Express trains called as 'superfast train' in India. These passenger trains are operated by Indian Railways to connect Metro cities with other important cities of India.

== Service ==
It is among the fastest trains on the Delhi–Dehradun section along with the 22457/58 Dehradun-Anand Vihar Terminal Vande Bharat Express, 12401/02 Nanda Devi AC Express & 12055/56 Dehradun Jan Shatabdi Express. It covers the distance of 314 kilometres in 6 hours 10 mins as 12017 Shatabdi Express (51 km/h) and 5 hours 55 mins as 12018 Shatabdi Express (53 km/h) .

== Loco link ==
It is hauled end to end by a WAP-7 engine from the Ghaziabad shed.

== Route and halts ==
• New Delhi

• Ghaziabad Junction

• Meerut City Junction

• Muzaffarnagar

• Saharanpur Junction ( Reversal )

• Roorkee

• Haridwar

• Dehradun

== Coach composition ==
This train runs with Morden LHB coaches.Coach Composition of this train is:

2 EOG Brake Van Luggage Car Coach

2 Executive Chair Car

12 AC Chair Car

== Coach positioning ==
Coach Positioning of this train at New Delhi Railway station is:

LOCO-EOG-E1-E3-C1-C2-C3-C4-C5-C6-C7-C8-C9-C10-C11-C12-EOG

Vice Versa Coach positioning at Dehradun station.

== Gallery ==
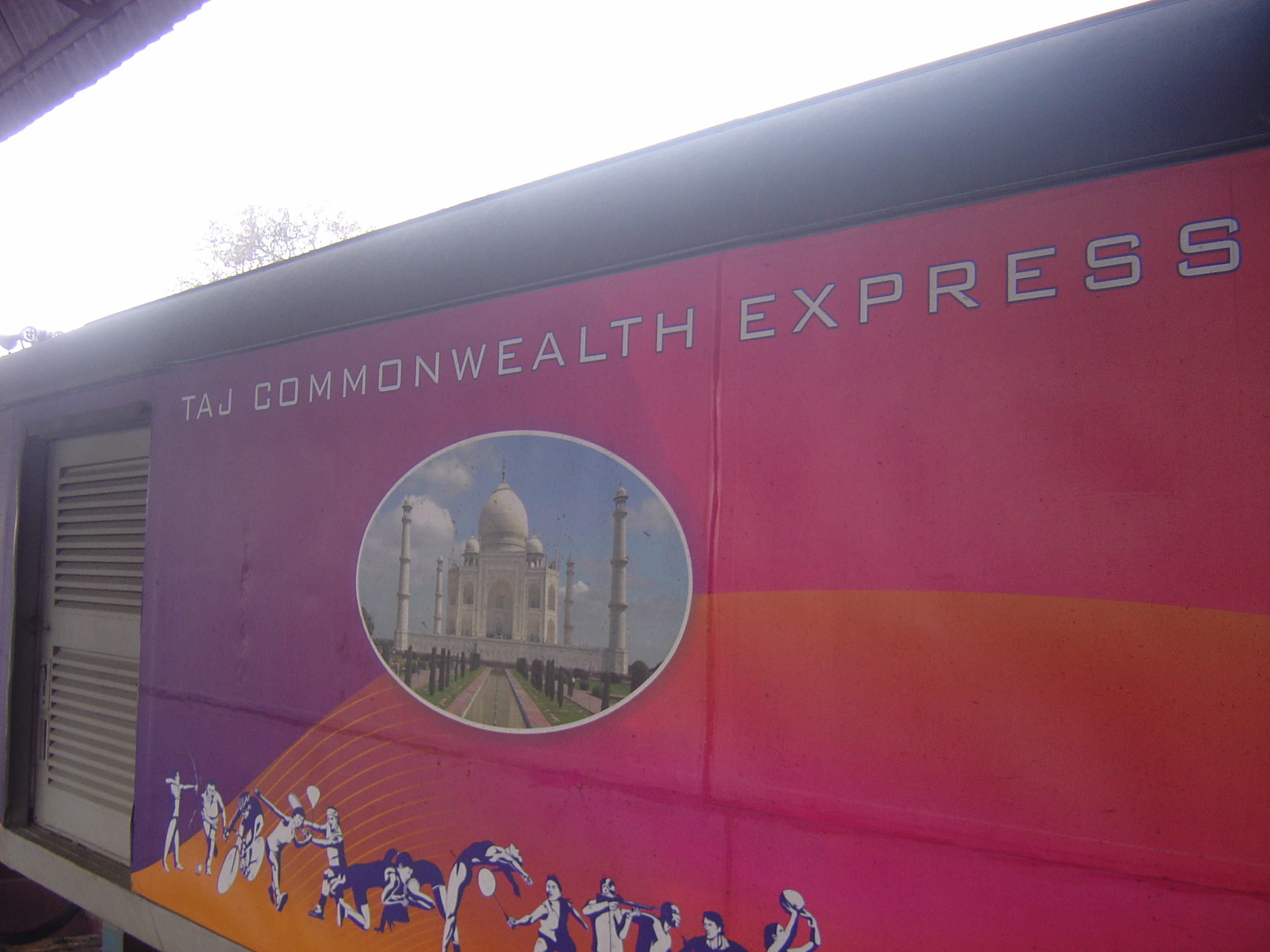
12018 Shatabdi Express EOG car

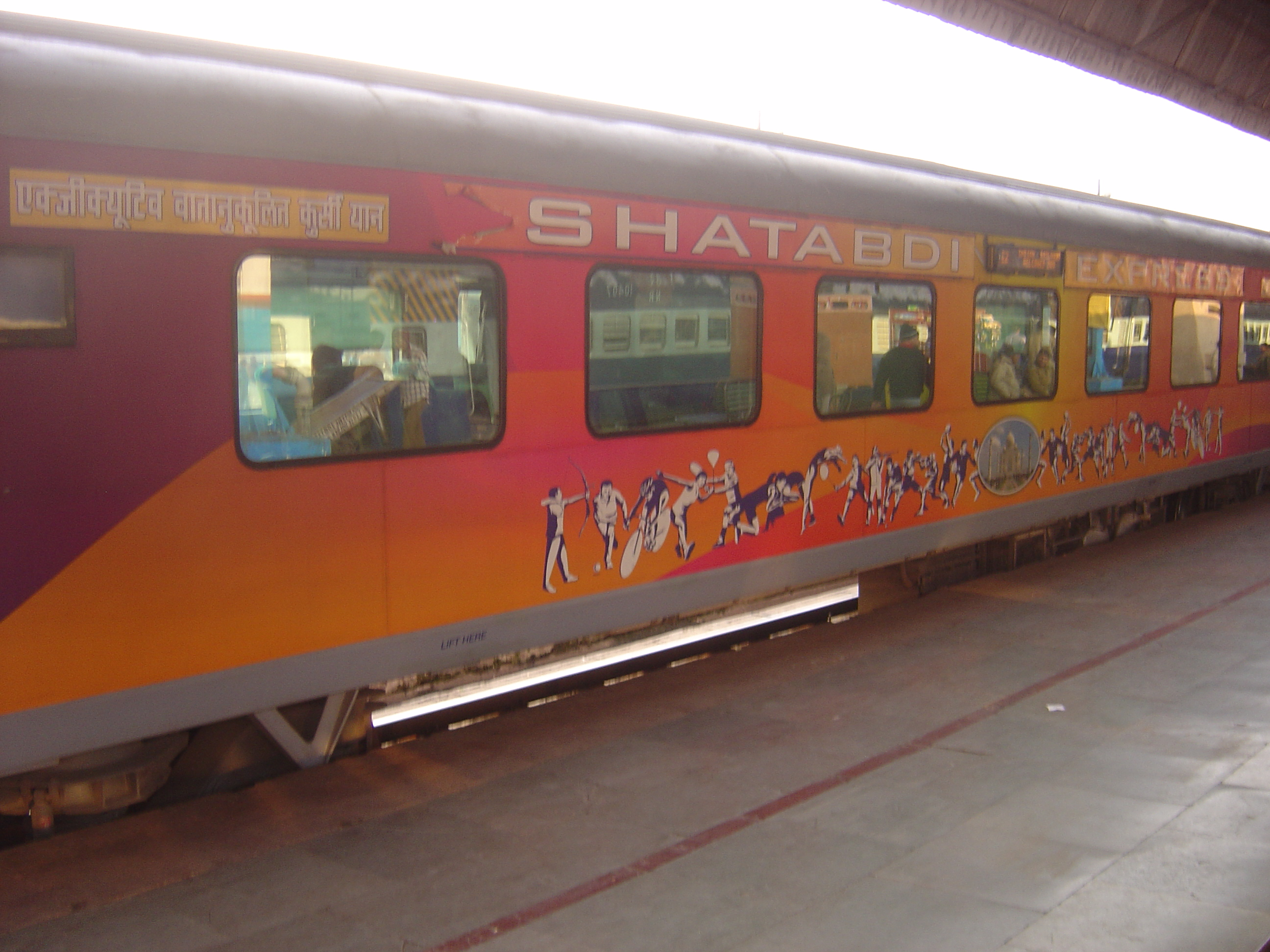
12018 Shatabdi Express in Commonwealth Games livery

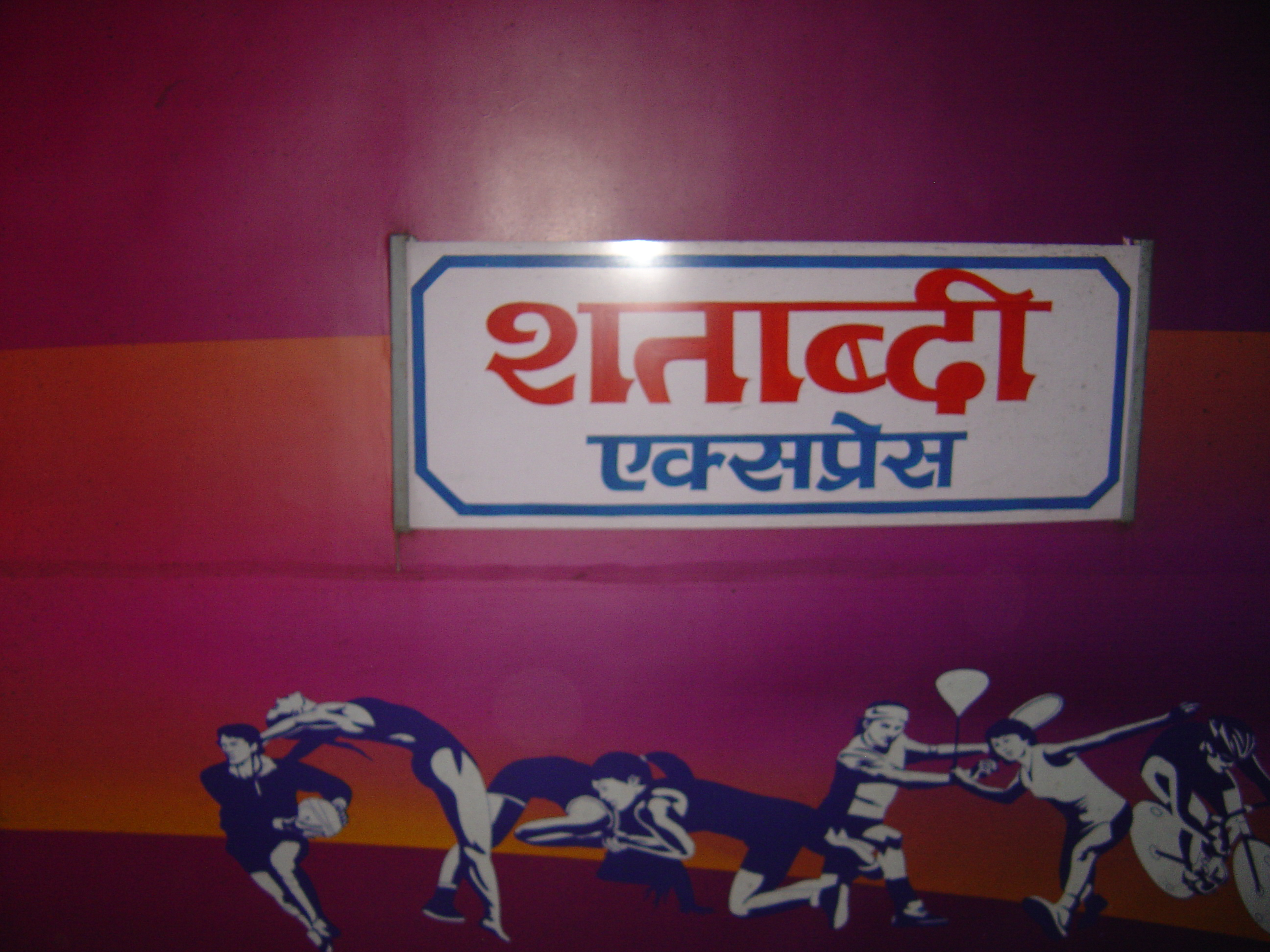
12018 Shatabdi Express trainboard

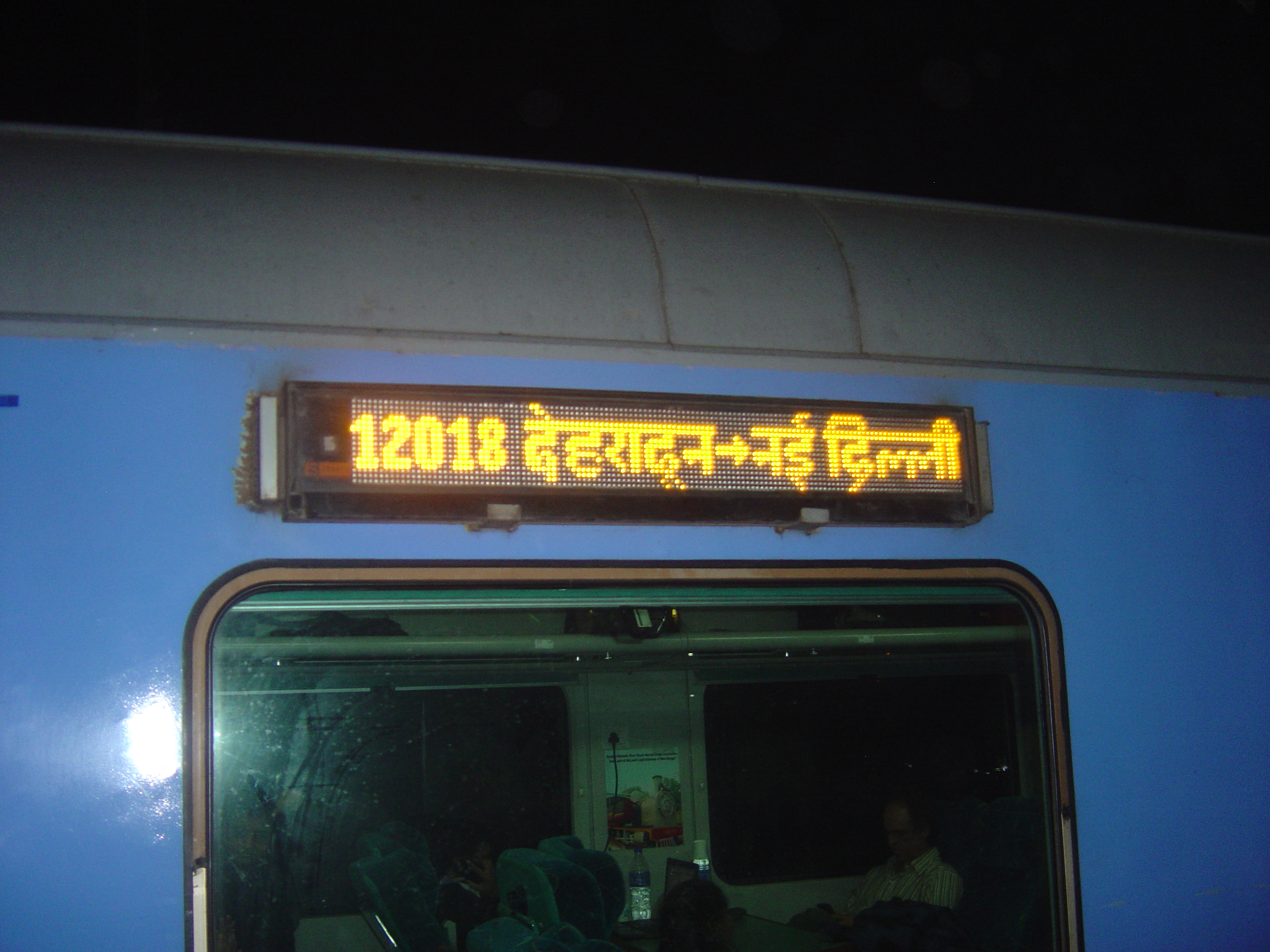
12018 Shatabdi Express electronic coachboard

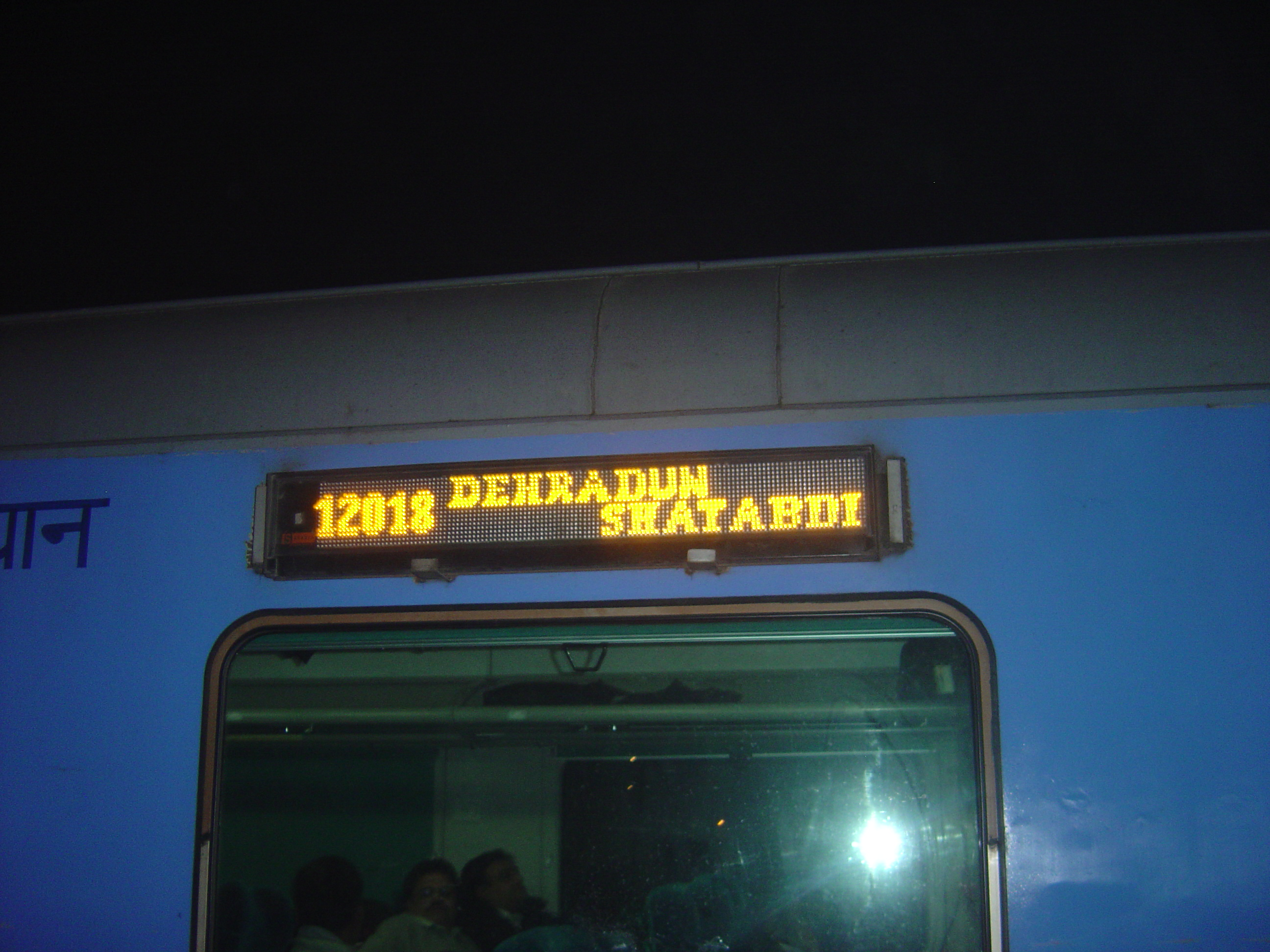
12018 Shatabdi Express – 1

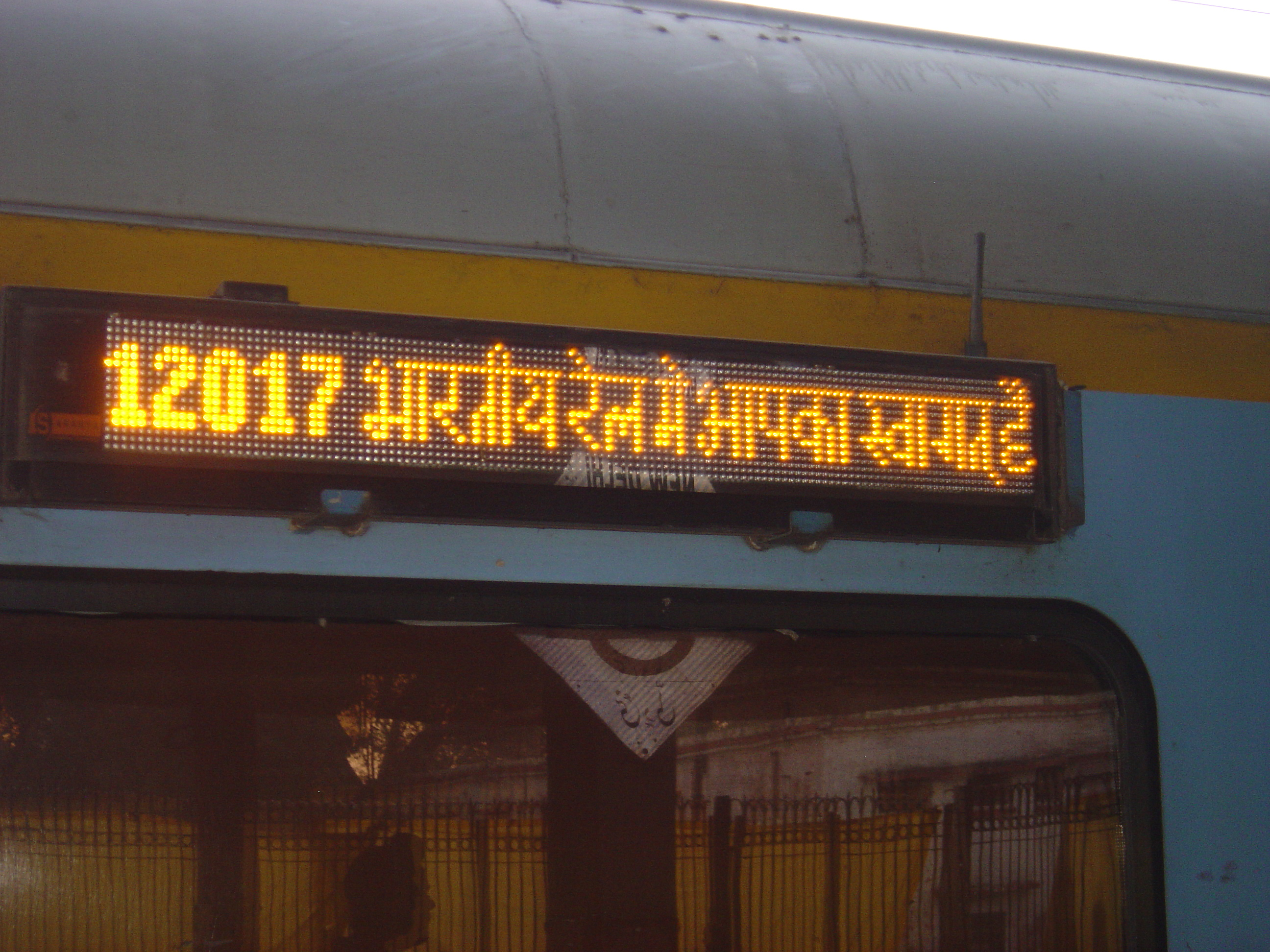
12017 Dehradun Shatabdi Express – Welcome

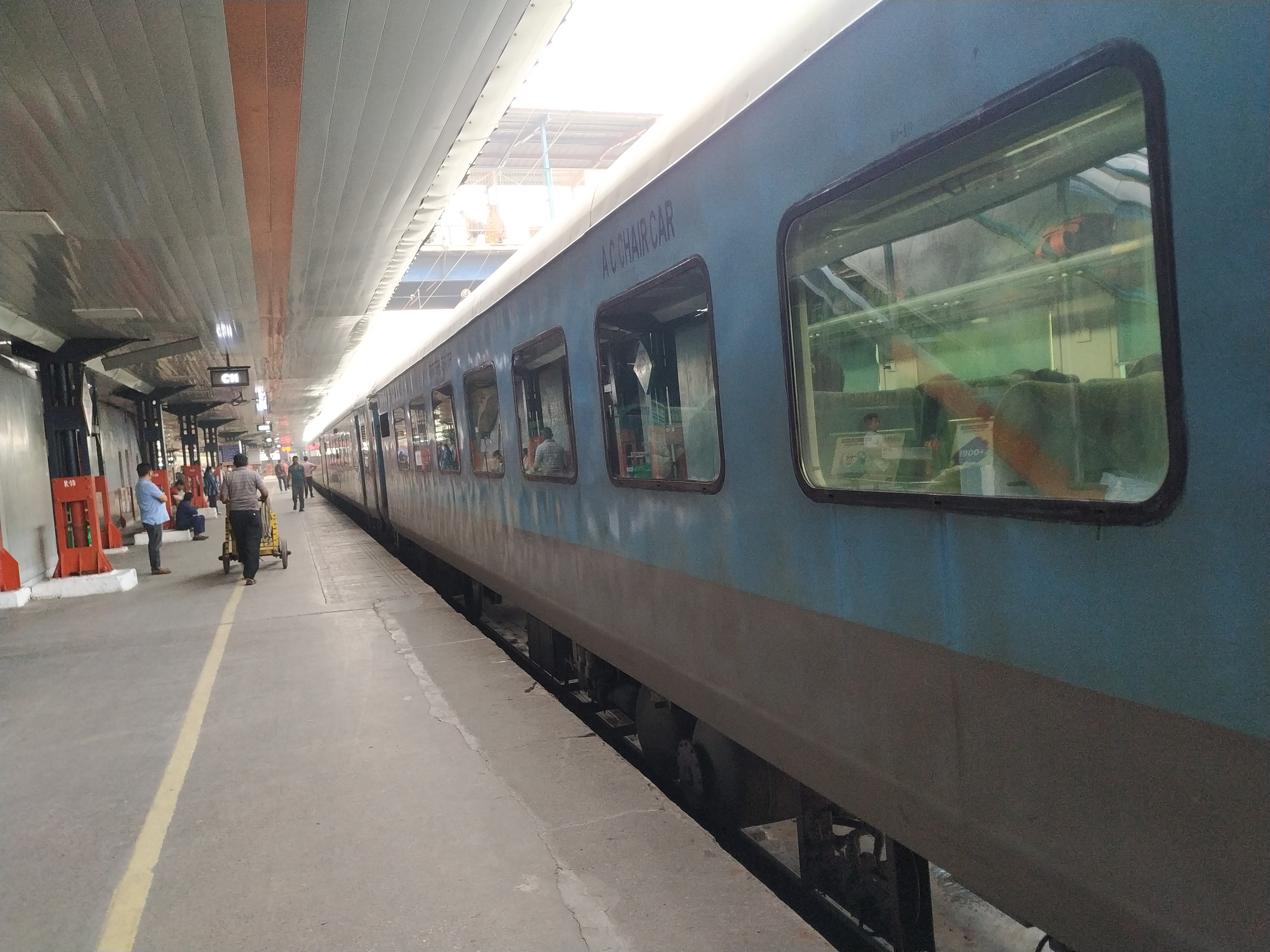
12017 New Delhi-Dehradun Shatabdi Express on Platform 16 in New Delhi
