= Hemkunt Express =

Train in India

Overview
- Service type: Express
- Locale: Uttarakhand, Uttar Pradesh, Haryana, Punjab, Jammu and Kashmir
- First service: 9 September 2015; 10 years ago(extended to Shri Mata Vaishno Devi Katra)
- Current operator: Northern Railway

Route
- Termini: Yog Nagari Rishikesh (YNRK); Shri Mata Vaishno Devi Katra (SVDK)
- Stops: 21
- Distance travelled: 679 km (422 mi)
- Average journey time: 13 hours 50 minutes
- Service frequency: Daily
- Train number: 14609 / 14610

On-board services
- Classes: AC 2 Tier, AC 3 Tier, AC 3 Tier Economy, Sleeper Class, General Unreserved
- Seating arrangements: Yes
- Sleeping arrangements: Yes
- Catering facilities: On-board catering, E-catering
- Observation facilities: Large windows
- Baggage facilities: No
- Other facilities: Below the seats

Technical
- Rolling stock: LHB coach
- Track gauge: 1,676 mm (5 ft 6 in)
- Electrification: Yes
- Operating speed: 130 km/h (81 mph) maximum, 43 km/h (27 mph) average including halts.

The 14609 / 14610 Hemkunt Express is an express train belonging to Indian Railways – Northern Railways zone that runs between Yog Nagari Rishikesh and Shri Mata Vaishno Devi Katra in India.

It operates as train number 14609 from Yog Nagari Rishikesh to Shri Mata Vaisno Devi Katra and as train number 14610 in the reverse direction. It is named after the Hemkunt Sahib, a holy place in the Sikh religion.

== Coaches ==
The Hemkunt Express presently has 2 AC 2 tier, 3 AC 3 tier, 10 Sleeper Class, 4 Second Class seating and 2 SLR (Seating cum Luggage Rake) coaches.

As with most train services in India, coach composition may be amended at the discretion of Indian Railways depending on demand.

== Coach positioning ==
The coach positioning of 14609 Hemkunt express is: LOCO-EOG-GS-A1-B2-B1-M1-S9-S8-S7-S6-S5-S4-S3-S2-S1-GS-GS-GS-SLR

Vice versa for 14610 Hemkunt Express

== Service ==
The 14609/14610 Hemkunt Express covers the distance of 679 kilometres in 13 hours 50 mins as 14609 Hemkunt Express (48 km/h) and in 13 hrs 25 mins as 14610 Hemkunt Express (49 km/h).

== Schedule ==
Both the trains run daily in both directions and reach the destination station the next day.

| Train number | Station code | Departure station | Departure time | Arrival station | Arrival time |
|---|---|---|---|---|---|
| 14609 | YNRK | Yog Nagari Rishikesh | 4:20 PM | Shri Mata Vaishno Devi Katra | 6:30 AM |
| 14610 | SVDK | Shri Mata Vaishno Devi Katra | 4:20 PM | Yog Nagari Rishikesh | 8:35 AM |

== Routeing ==
The Hemkunt Express runs from Yog Nagri Rishikesh via Virbhadra, Raiwala Junction, Moti Chur, Haridwar Junction, Roorkee, Saharanpur Junction, Yamunanagar Jaghdhri, Ambala Cantonment, Chandigarh Junction, Sas Nagar Mohali, Ludhiana, Jalandhar Cantonment Junction, Dasuya, Mukerian, Pathankot Cantonment, Hiranagar, Kathua, Samba, to Jammu Tawi to MCTM Udhampur to Shri Mata Vaishno Devi Katra.

== Traction ==
When the train was started it used to get hauled by a WDP-4D diesel locomotive of the Tughlakabad Loco Shed, later the whole route is now fully electrified and it is hauled by a WAP-7 electric locomotive of Ghaziabad Loco Shed.
