= Rishikesh railway station =

Railway station in Uttarakhand, India

- Indian Railways Logo

General information
- Location: Rishikesh, Uttarakhand; India
- Coordinates: 30.1077°N 78.2880°E
- Elevation: 372 metres (1,220 ft)
- System: Indian Railways
- Owner: Indian Railways
- Line: Raiwala–Rishikesh line
- Platforms: 3
- Tracks: 3

Construction
- Structure type: At grade
- Parking: Available (Paid)

Other information
- Status: Functioning
- Station code: RKSH
- Zone(s): Northern Railway
- Division(s): Moradabad

History
- Opened: 2020
Location

Rishikesh railway station, station code RKSH, is a railway terminal station serving the city of Rishikesh in the Indian state of Uttarakhand. It lies on Northern railway network zone of Indian Railways. It is no longer the only station in Rishikesh, as another one has been built to increase capacity, known as Yog Nagari Rishikesh railway station, located 2 km to the west of Rishikesh station.

== Location ==
The railway station is located in Rishikesh in Dehradun district, Uttarakhand, India.

== Reduced Level ==
The RL of the station is 372 m above mean sea level in Mumbai.

== Signage ==
The station signage is predominantly in English, Hindi and Sanskrit.

== Source station ==
The station acts as source station for Hemkunt Express which runs from Rishikesh to Shri Mata Vaishno Devi Katra at 05:20 PM (IST) with train number 14609 and Shri Mata Vaishno Devi Katra to Rishikesh at 04:30 PM (IST) with train number 14610.

Apart from that several short and long-distance train originate from here.

== See also ==
- Rishikesh–Karnaprayag Railway
- Haridwar railway station
