= Yoga Express =

Train in India

Overview
- Service type: Express
- Locale: Gujarat, Rajasthan, Haryana, Delhi, Uttar Pradesh & Uttarakhand
- Current operator: Western Railway

Route
- Termini: Sabarmati Junction (SBIB); Yog Nagari Rishikesh (YNRK)
- Stops: 43
- Distance travelled: 1,208 km (751 mi)
- Average journey time: 25 hours 40 minutes
- Service frequency: Daily
- Train number: 19031 / 19032

On-board services
- Classes: AC First Class, AC 2 Tier, AC 3 Tier, Sleeper Class, General Unreserved
- Seating arrangements: Yes
- Sleeping arrangements: Yes
- Catering facilities: On-board catering, E-catering
- Observation facilities: Large windows
- Baggage facilities: Available
- Other facilities: Below the seats

Technical
- Rolling stock: LHB coach
- Track gauge: 1,676 mm (5 ft 6 in)
- Operating speed: 130 km/h (81 mph) maximum, 47 km/h (29 mph) average including halts.
- Rake sharing: Rake Sharing with 19143/19144 Lok Shakti Express
Route map
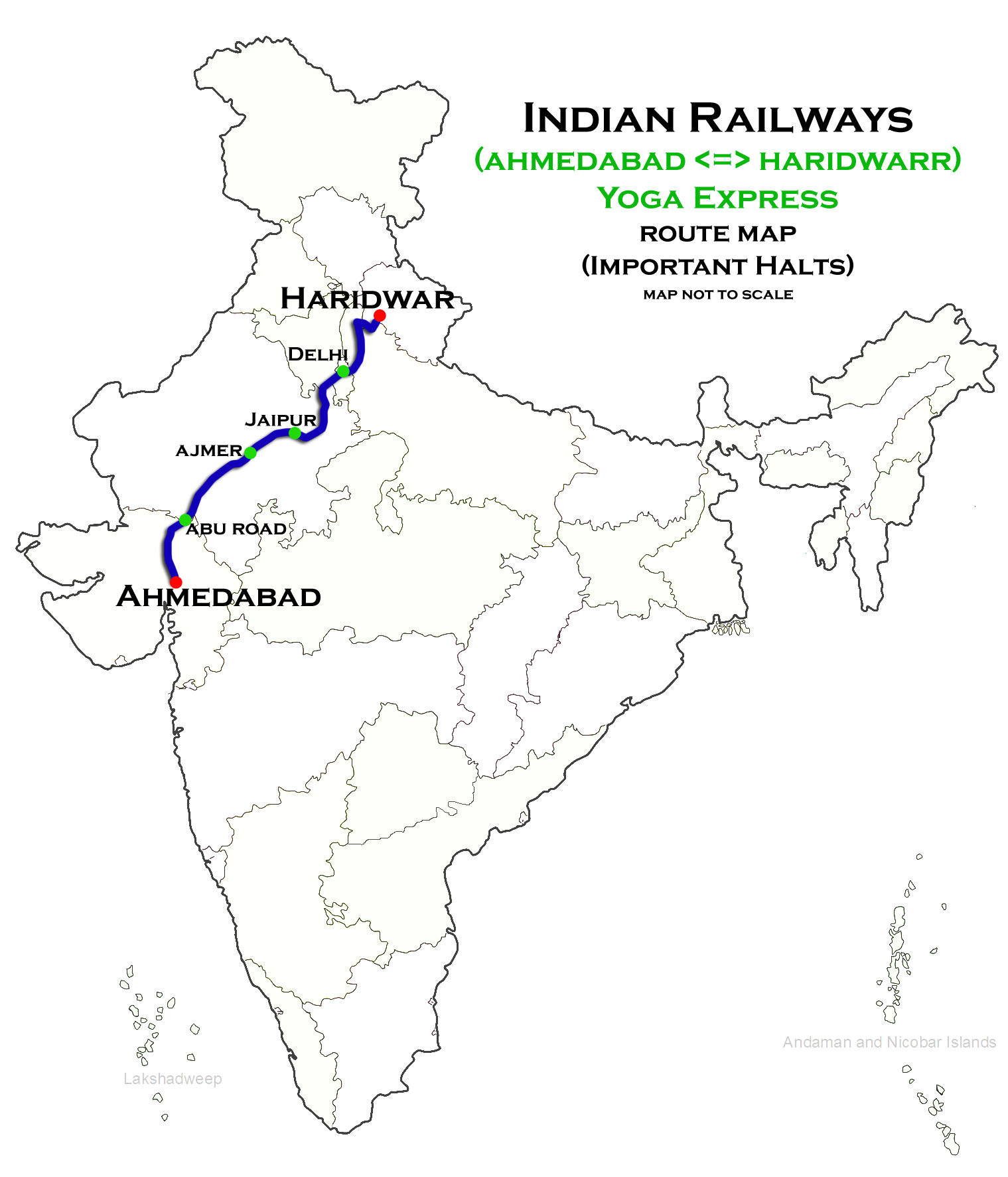

The 19031 / 19032 Yoga Express is an express train belonging to Indian Railways that runs between Sabarmati Junction and Rishikesh in India. It is a daily service. It operates as train number 19031 from Sabarmati Junction to Rishikesh and as train number 19032 in the reverse direction.

== Coaches ==
As it shares rakes with the Lok Shakti Express, it has 1 AC 1st Class cum AC 2 tier, 1 AC 2 tier, 5 AC 3 tier, 10 Sleeper class, 4 General class coaches. As with most train services in India, Coach Composition may be amended at the discretion of Indian Railways depending on demand. It also carries a Railway Mail coach thus earning it the title of "Mail" in its name when it ran as Haridwar Mail.

== Route & halts ==
The important halts of the train are :

- Sabarmati Junction
- Gandhinagar Capital
- Kalol
- Mahesana Junction
- Unjha
- Siddhpur
- Palanpur Junction
- Abu Road
- Pindwara
- Jawai bandh
- Falna
- Rani
- Somesar
- Marwar Junction
- Sojat Rd
- Haripur
- Sendra
- Beawar
- Ajmer Junction
- Kishangarh
- Phulera Junction
- Jaipur Junction
- Gandhinagar Jaipur
- Bandikui Junction
- Alwar Junction
- Kairthal railway station
- Rewari Junction
- Pataudi rd
- Gurgaon
- Delhi Cantonment
- Old Delhi
- Delhi Shahdara
- Ghaziabad Junction
- New Ghaziabad
- Modinagar
- Meerut City Junction
- Meerut cant
- Sakhoti Tanda
- Khatauli
- Muzaffarnagar
- Deoband
- Tapri Junction
- Roorkee
- Haridwar
- Yog Nagari Rishikesh

== Service ==
It is a daily train & covers the distance of 1280 kilometres in 26 hours 05 mins as 19031 Yoga Express (46.31 km/h) & 1207 kilometres 25 hours 45 mins as 19032 Yoga Express (46.87 km/h). As its average speed is below 55 km/h, it does not have a superfast charge on its fare.

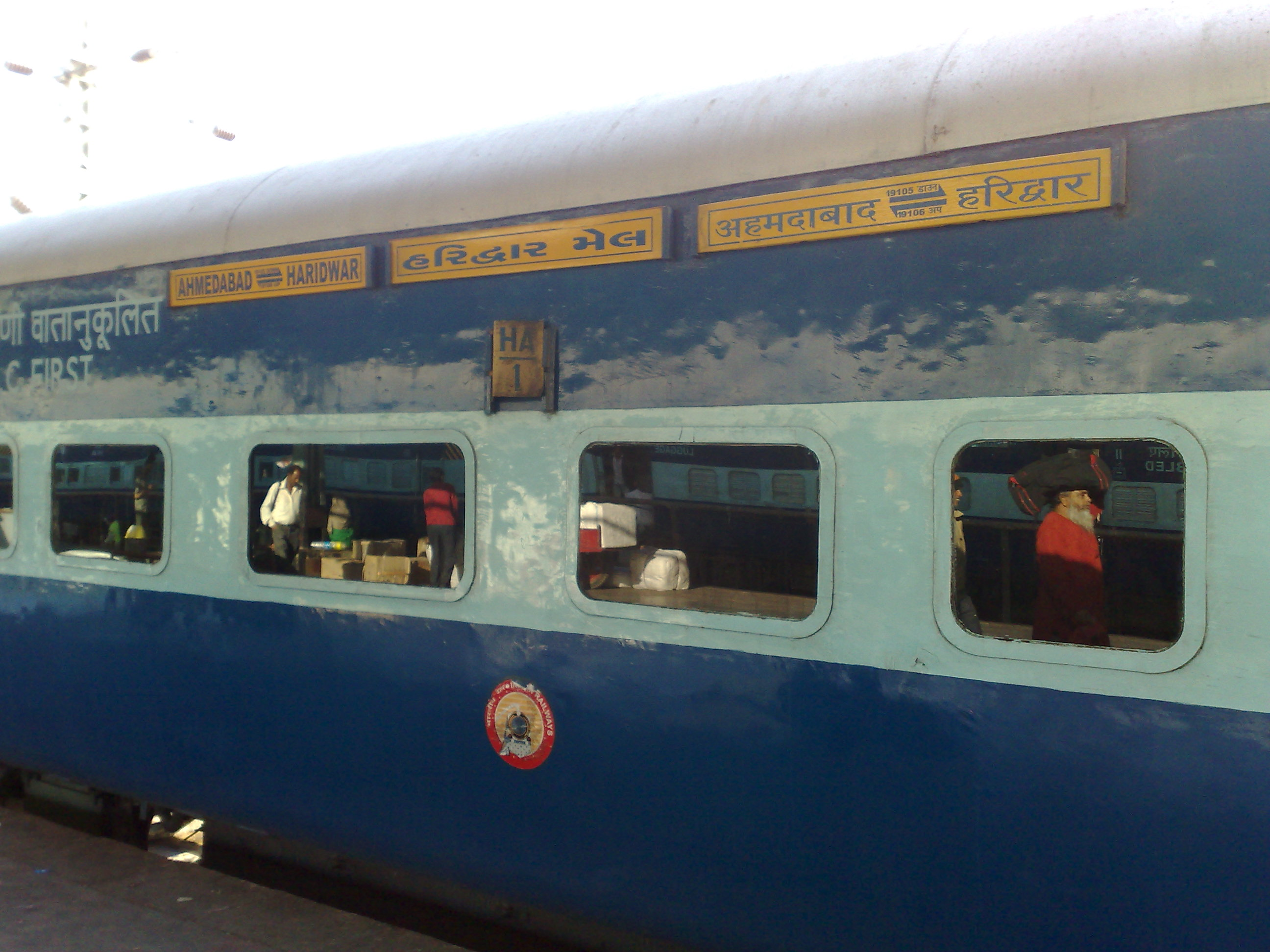
19105 Haridwar Mail - coach HA 1

== Traction ==
As the route is now fully electrified, It is being hauled by a Vadodara Loco Shed or Valsad Loco Shed based WAP-7 electric locomotive on its entire journey.

== Gallery ==
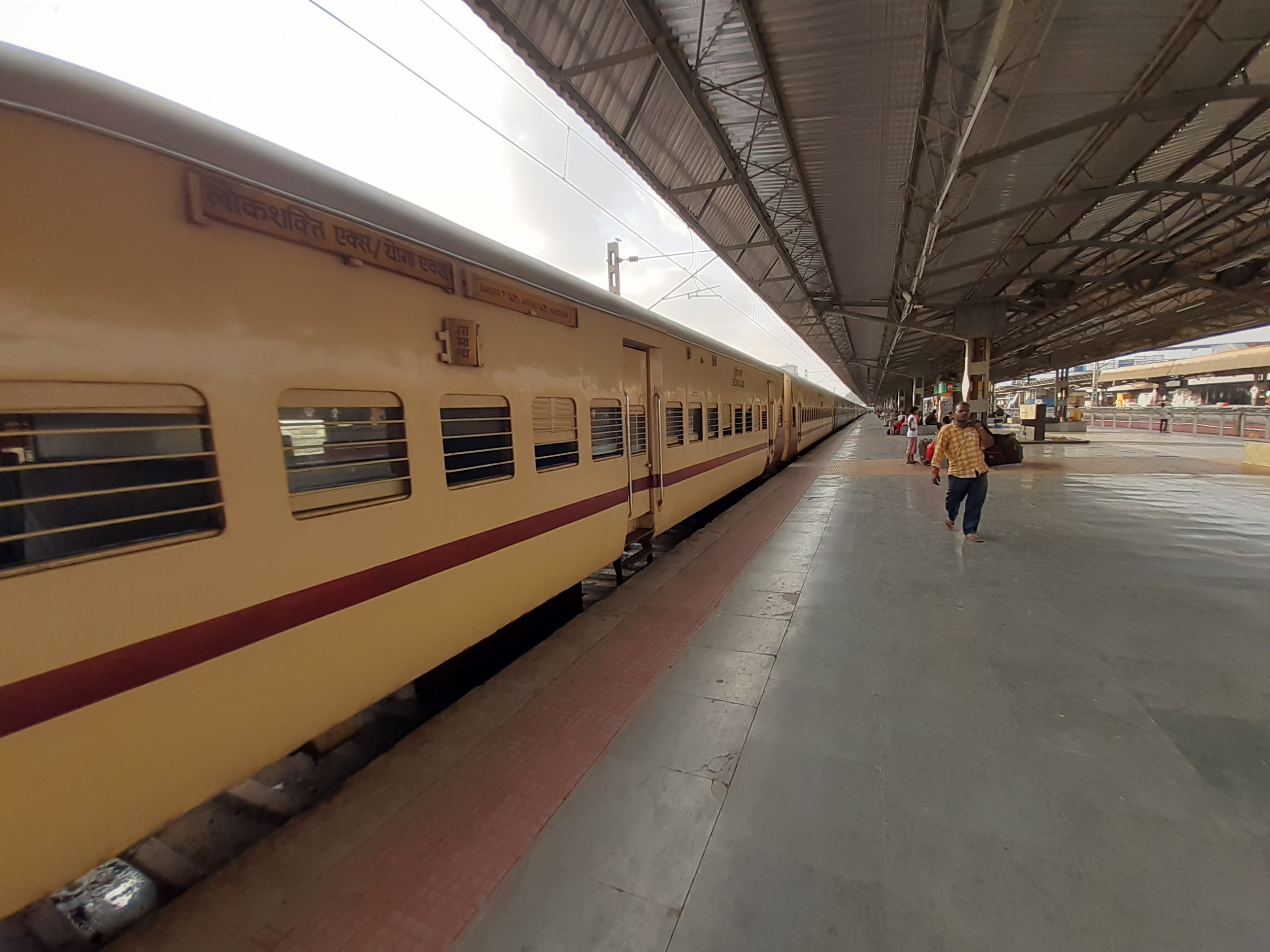
19031 Yoga Express

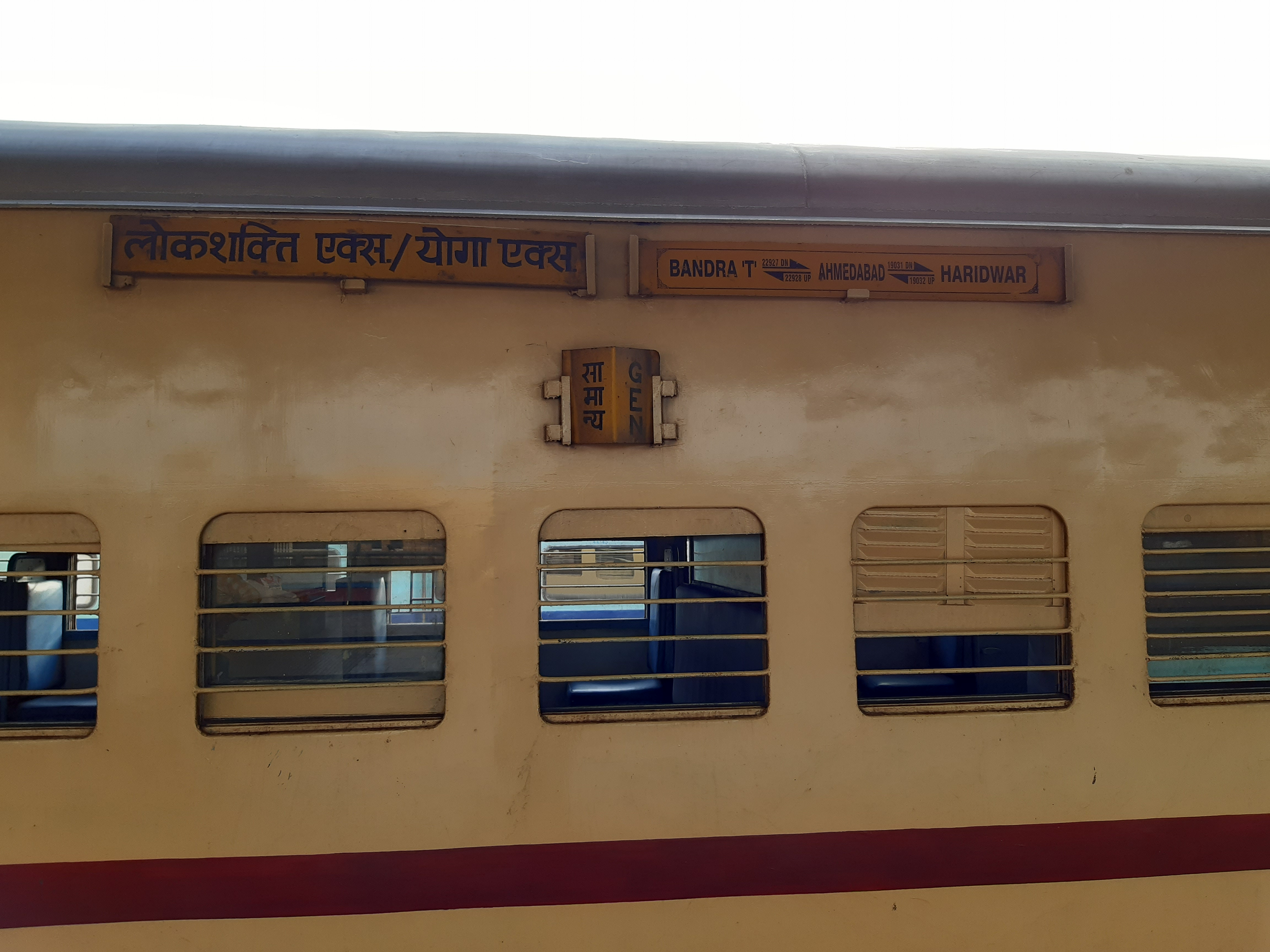
19031 Yoga Express - General/Unreserved coach

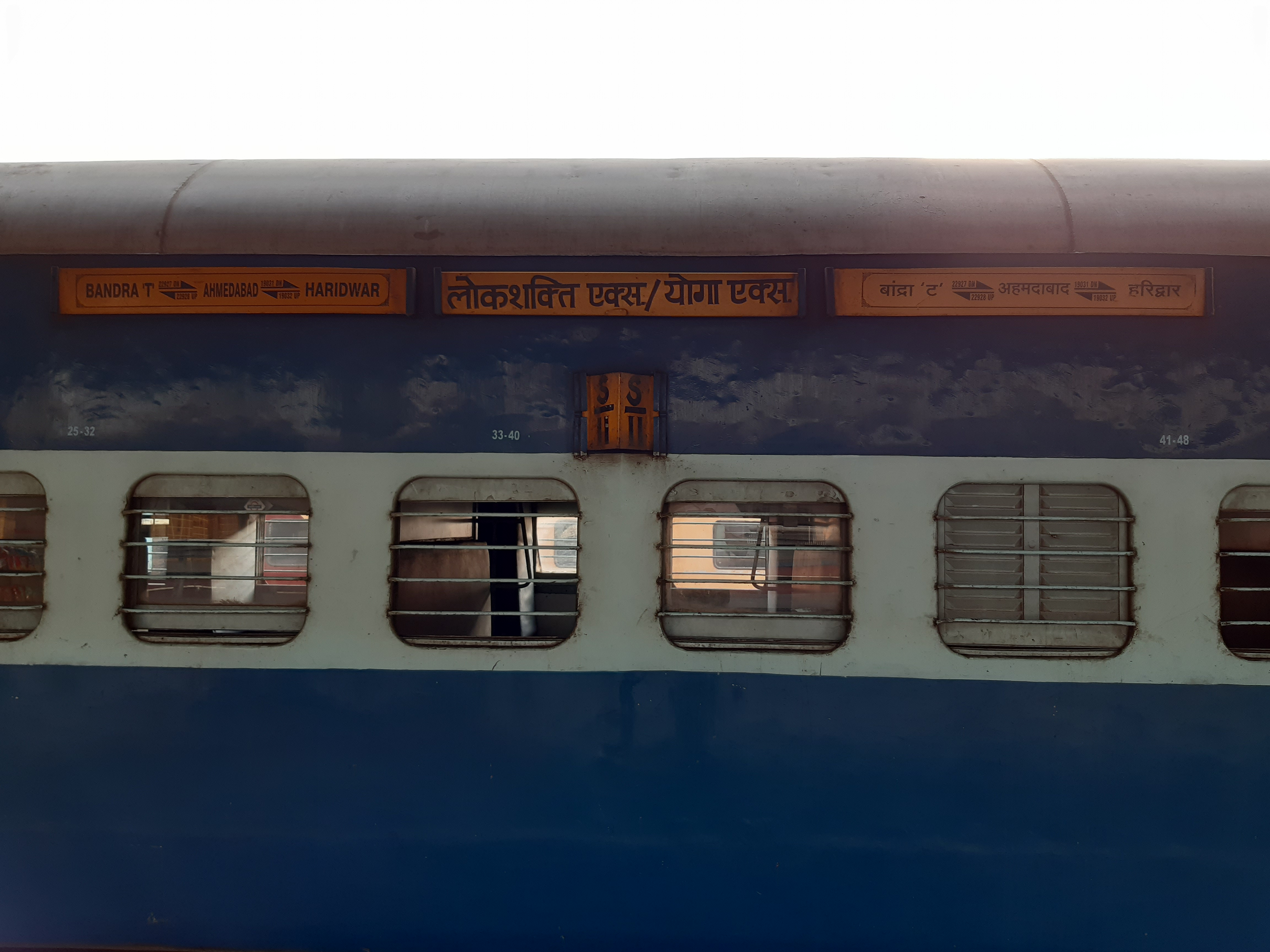
19031 Yoga Express - Sleeper Class coach

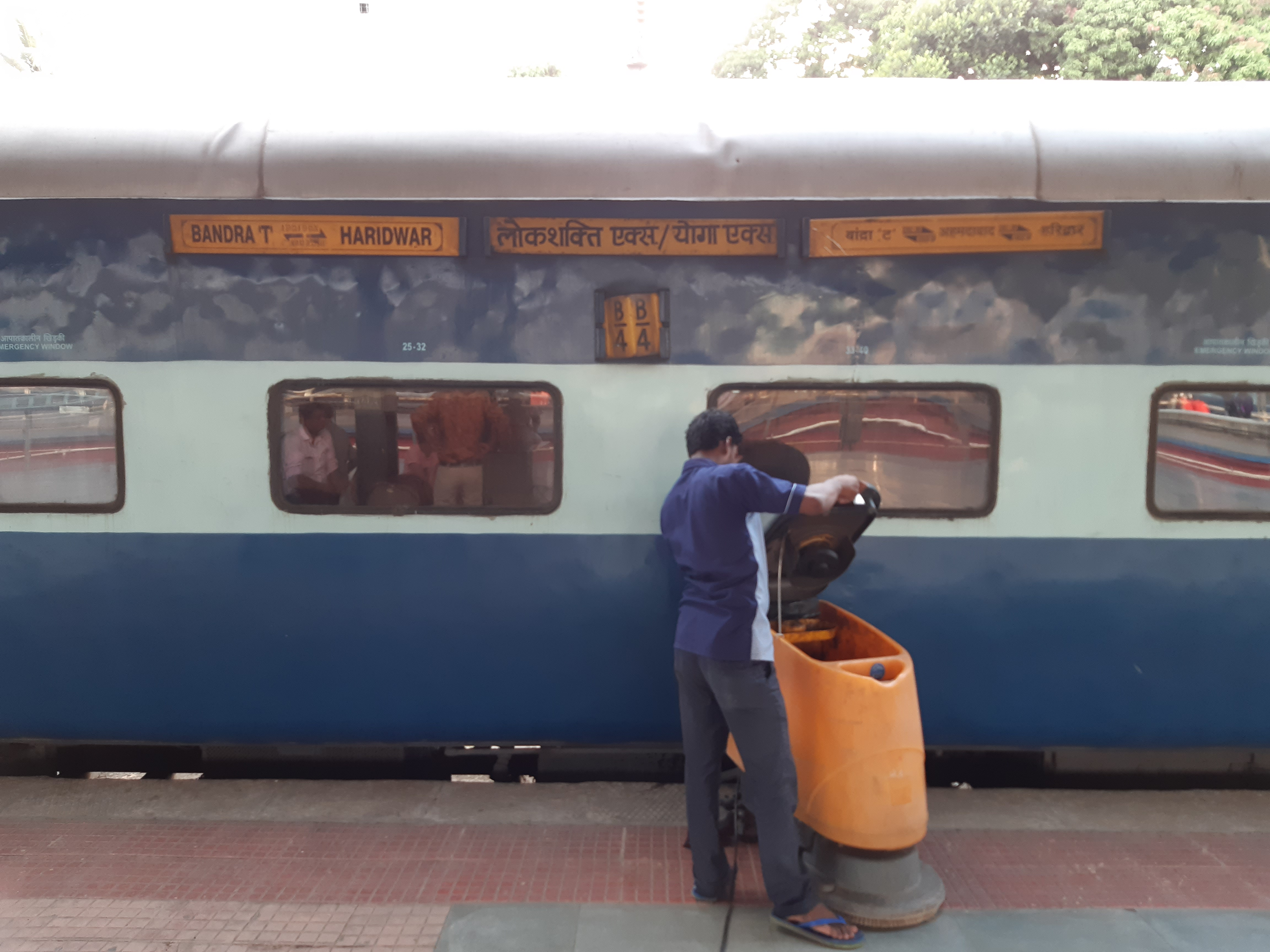
19031 Yoga Express - AC 3 tier coach

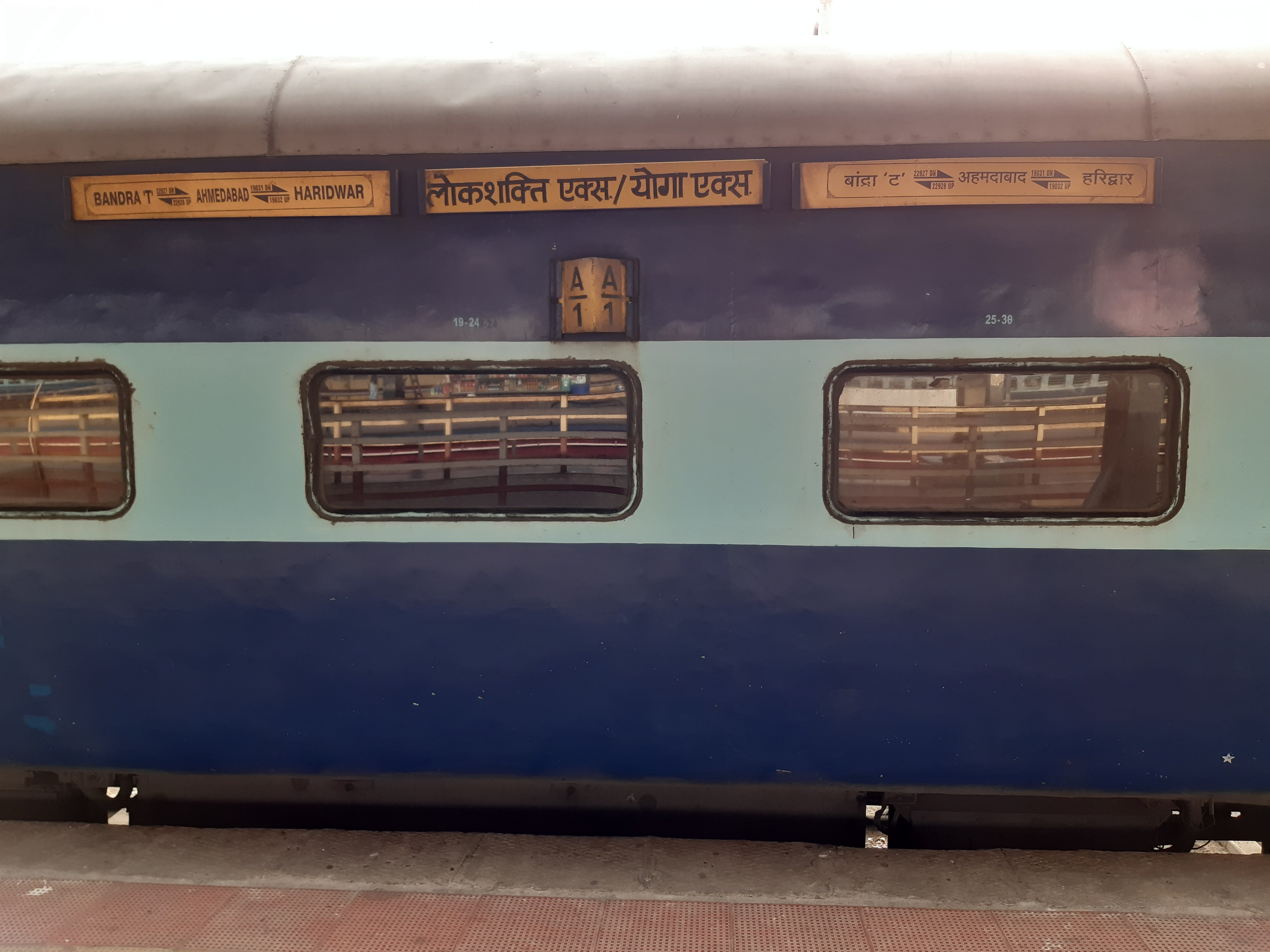
19031 Yoga Express - AC 2 tier coach

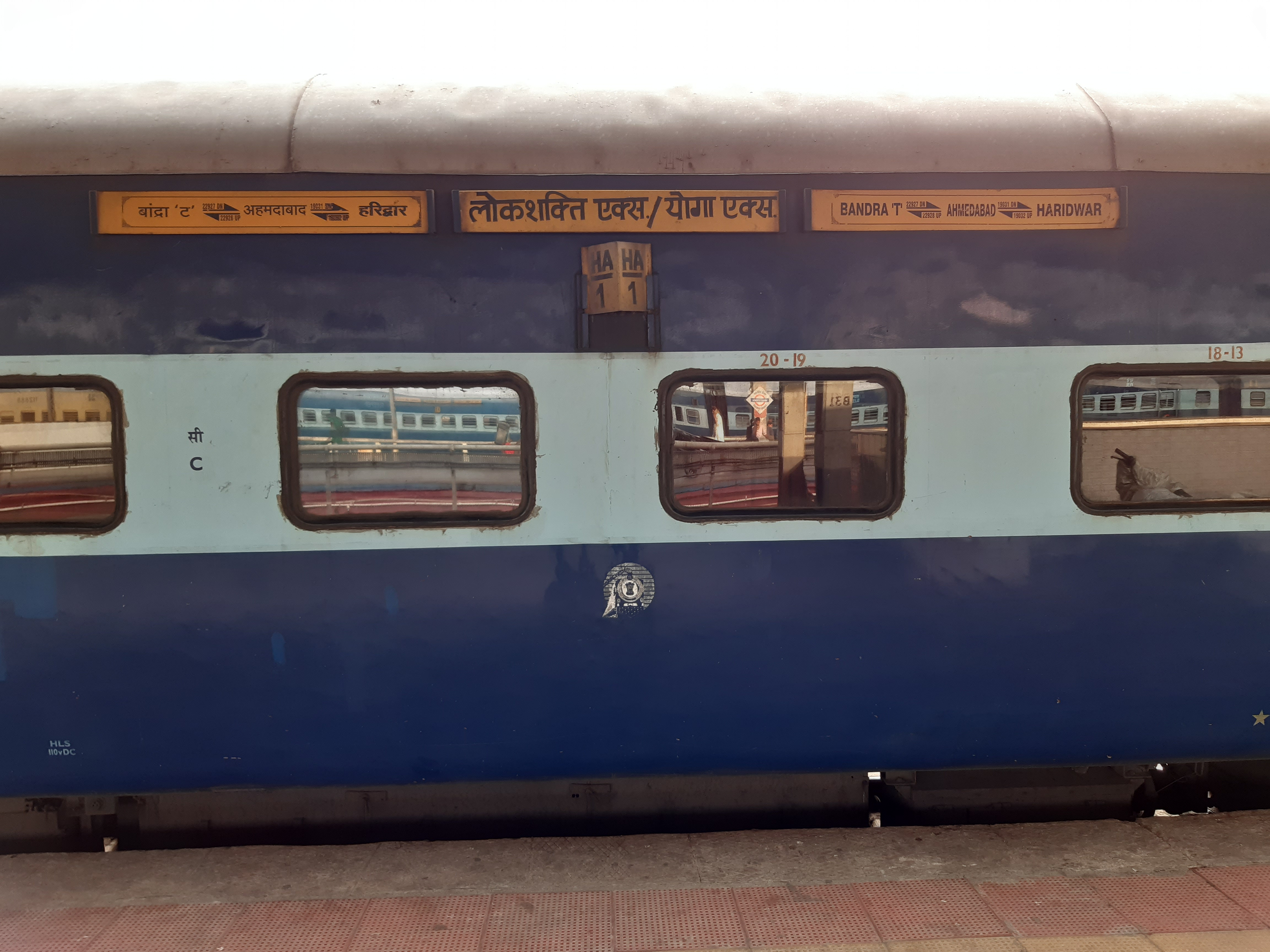
19031 Yoga Express - AC 1st Class cum AC 2 tier coach
