= Thiruvananthapuram North–Yog Nagari Rishikesh Superfast Express =

Train in India

Thiruvananthapuram North-Yog Nagari Rishikesh Superfast Express

Overview
- Service type: Superfast Express
- Locale: Kerala, Karnataka, Goa, Maharashtra, Gujarat, Madhya Pradesh, Rajasthan, Haryana, Delhi, Uttar Pradesh & Uttarakhand
- Current operator: Southern Railway

Route
- Termini: Thiruvananthapuram North (TVCN); Yog Nagari Rishikesh (YNRK)
- Stops: 27
- Distance travelled: 3,111 km (1,933 mi)
- Average journey time: 52 hours 25 minutes
- Service frequency: Weekly
- Train number: 22659 / 22660

On-board services
- Classes: AC 2 Tier, AC 3 Tier, Sleeper Class, General Unreserved
- Seating arrangements: Yes
- Sleeping arrangements: Yes
- Catering facilities: On-board catering, E-catering
- Observation facilities: Large windows
- Baggage facilities: Available
- Other facilities: Below the seats

Technical
- Rolling stock: LHB coach
- Track gauge: 1,676 mm (5 ft 6 in)
- Operating speed: 130 km/h (81 mph) maximum, 60 km/h (37 mph) average including halts.

The 22659 / 22660 Thiruvananthapuram North–Yog Nagari Rishikesh Superfast Express is a Superfast Express train belonging to Indian Railways - Southern Railway zone that runs between Thiruvananthapuram North and Yog Nagari Rishikesh in India. This train runs via Alappuzha.

It operates as train number 22659 from Thiruvananthapuram North to Yog Nagari Rishikesh and as train number 22660 in the reverse direction serving the nine states of Kerala, Karnataka, Goa, Maharashtra, Gujarat, Rajasthan, Delhi, Uttar Pradesh and Uttarakhand.

== Coaches ==
The 22659 / 60 Thiruvananthapuram North - Yog Nagari Rishikesh Superfast Express runs with highly refurbished LHB coaches. It has 2 AC Two tier, 6 AC Three tier, 8 Sleeper Class, 3 General Unreserved, 1 Pantry Car and 2 EOG (End On Generator) coaches.

As is customary with most train services in India, Coach Composition may be amended at the discretion of Indian Railways depending on demand.

== Timings ==
The 22659 Thiruvananthapuram North - Yog Nagari Rishikesh Superfast Express covers the distance of 3459 kilometres in 51 hours 35 mins (60 km/h) and in 54 hours 15 mins as 22660 Yog Nagari Rishikesh -Thiruvananthapuram North Superfast Express (60 km/h).

As the average speed of the train is above 55 km/h (34 mph), as per Indian Railways rules, its fare includes a superfast surcharge.

== Route & halts ==
1. Thiruvananthapuram North
2. Kollam
3. Alappuzha
4. Ernakulam Junction
5. Thrissur
6. Shoranur Junction
7. Kozhikode
8. Kannur
9. Kasaragod
10. Mangalore
11. Udupi
12. Madgaon
13. Ratnagiri
14. Panvel
15. Vasai Road
16. Palghar
17. Surat
18. Vadodara Junction
19. Kota Junction
20. Hazrat Nizamuddin
21. Ghaziabad Junction
22. Meerut City
23. Muzaffarnagar
24. Roorkee
25. Haridwar
26. Yog Nagari Rishikesh

== Traction ==
As the route is fully electrified, it is hauled by a Royapuram Loco Shed or Erode Loco Shed based WAP-7 electric locomotive from Thiruvananthapuram North to Yog Nagari Rishikesh and vice versa.

== History ==
It was introduced as a superfast express between Thiruvananthapuram North - Dehradun Superfast Express. The train used to run via Kottayam and was rerouted to Alappuzha post covid lockdown. As Dehradun Railway doesn't hold 24 coaches in platform some slip coaches will be detached at Haridwar which ran as Haridwar - Thiruvananthapuram North Slip Superfast Express. Since Yog Nagari Rishikesh Railway Station was developed and reconstructed, the railway authority had decided to withdraw coaches running to Dehradun and slip coaches to Haridwar. Instead they decided to run it as a train without slip coaches. After Yog Nagari Rishikesh was developed it was extended to Rishikesh, instead of Dehradun and slip coaches were made to run as a full coach train to Rishikesh. Therefore, it runs as Thiruvananthapuram North - Yog Nagari Rishikesh Superfast Express.

After April 2021, the service to Dehradun and the slip coaches to Haridwar were permanently discontinued and was extended to Rishikesh instead of Dehradun and it will run as Yog Nagari Rishikesh - Thiruvananthapuram North Superfast Express.
