= Yog Nagari Rishikesh railway station =

Railway station in Uttarakhand, India

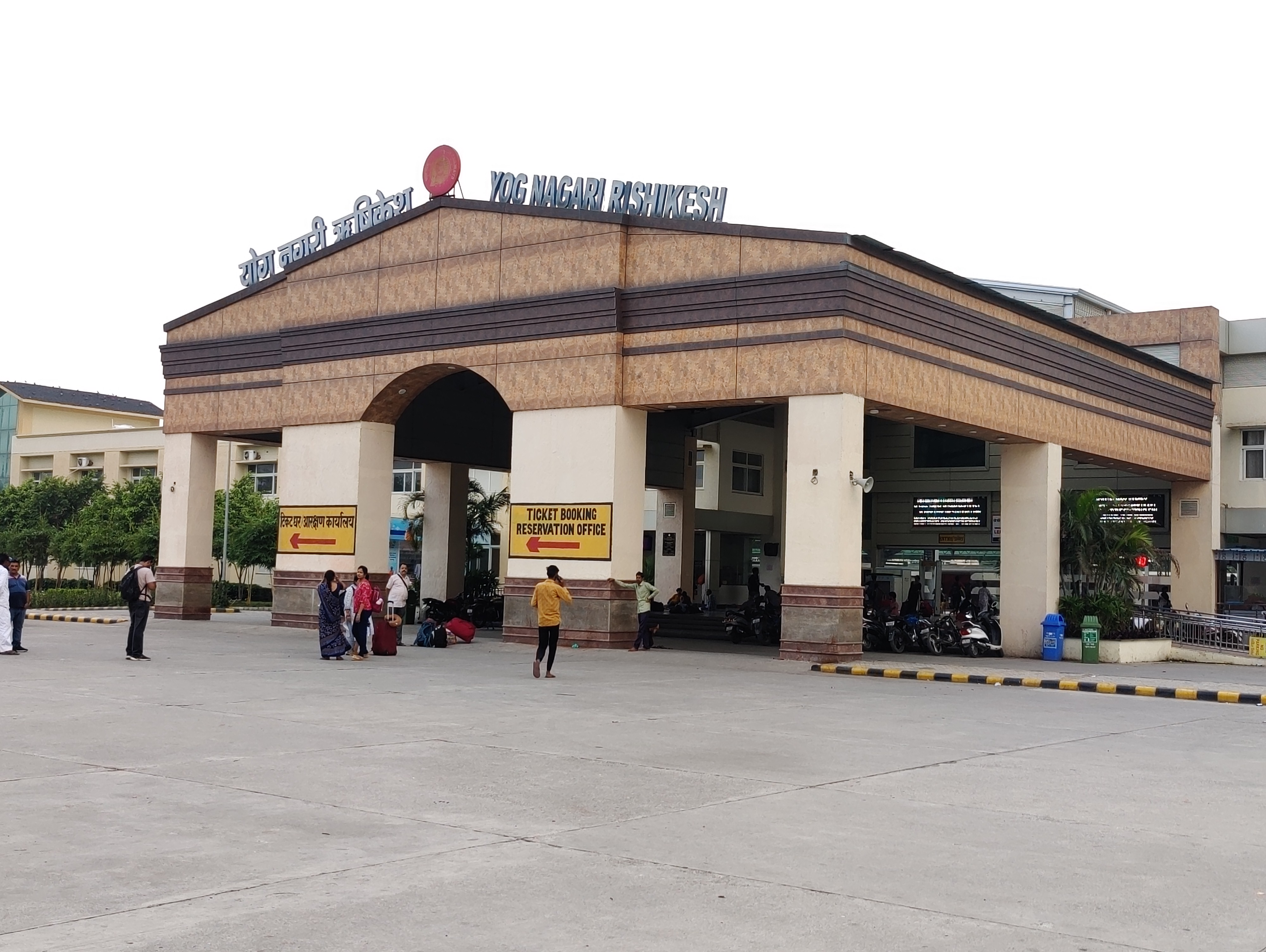
- Yog Nagari Rishikesh railway station from outside

General information
- Location: THDC Colony, Rishikesh, Uttarakhand; India
- Coordinates: 30.1099628°N 78.2780801°E
- Elevation: 372 metres (1,220 ft)
- System: Indian Railways
- Owner: Indian Railways
- Lines: Rishikesh–Karnaprayag line Raiwala–Rishikesh line
- Platforms: 3
- Tracks: 3

Construction
- Structure type: Standard (on ground station)
- Parking: Available (Paid)

Other information
- Status: Functioning
- Station code: YNRK
- Zone(s): Northern Railway
- Division(s): Moradabad

History
- Opened: 12 January 2021; 5 years ago
- Electrified: Single Electric-Line
Location

Yog Nagari Rishikesh railway station (station code: YNRK) is a railway station serving the city of Rishikesh in Uttarakhand, India. It operates under the Northern Railway zone of Indian Railways.

== History ==
The train station opened on 21 January 2021. It will be the western terminus of the Rishikesh–Karnaprayag line to Karnaprayag. It is Indian Railways' proposed route for the Char Dham Railway to connect to the Chota Char Dham.

== Location ==
The railway station is located in Rishikesh in Dehradun District, Uttarakhand, India.

== Signage ==
The station signage is predominantly in English, Hindi and Sanskrit.

== Train ==
Indian railways had extended few trains to the station.

- Kalinga Utkal Express
- Yoga Express
- Yog Nagari Rishikesh–Prayagraj Sangam Express
- Yog Nagari Rishikesh–Jammu Tawi Express
- Udaipur City–Yog Nagari Rishikesh Express
- Doon Express
- Ujjaini Express
- Indore–Dehradun Express

== See also ==
- Rishikesh railway station
- Rishikesh–Karnaprayag line
