= Dehradun railway station =

Railway station in Uttarakhand, India

Dehradun Terminal
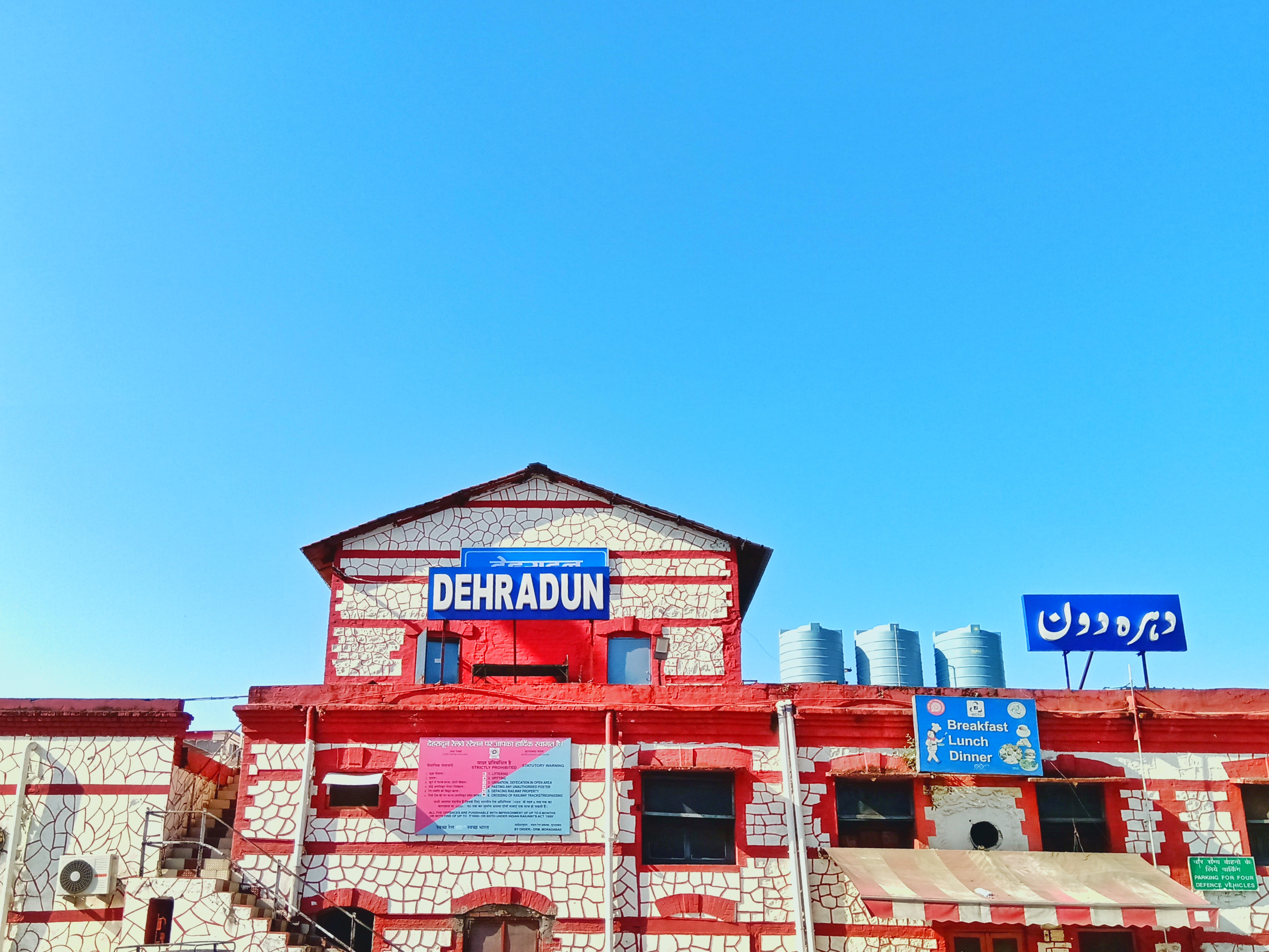
- Dehradun railway station building

General information
- Location: Railway colony Rd, Govind Nagar, Dehradun, Uttarakhand; India
- Coordinates: 30.3139°N 78.0336°E
- Elevation: 636.960 metres (2,089 ft 9.2 in)
- System: Express train and Passenger train station
- Owner: Indian Railways
- Operator: Northern Railway zone
- Line: Laksar–Dehradun line
- Platforms: 5
- Tracks: 8

Construction
- Structure type: At grade
- Parking: Yes
- Accessible: Available

Other information
- Status: Active
- Station code: DDN
- Zone(s): Northern Railway
- Division(s): Moradabad

History
- Opened: 1899

Services
- 12017/12018 Dehradun Shatabdi Express
- 12055/12056 Dehradun Jan Shatabdi Express
- 12401/12402 Nanda Devi Express
- 13035/13036 Upasana Express
- 13037/13038 Kumbh Express
- 14041/14042 Mussoorie Express
- 14119/14120 Kathgodam Express
- 14631/14632 Dehradun–Amritsar Express
- 19019/19020 Dehradun Express
- 15001/15002 Rapti Ganga Express
- 15119/15120 Varanasi–Dehradun Express
- 22659/22660 Kochuveli–Dehradun Superfast Express
- Prayagraj Link Express
Location
- Location within Uttarakhand

Dehradun Terminal railway station is a railway station in Dehradun, Uttarakhand, India, on the Northern line of the Northern Railway network. It is owned by Indian Railways.

It was established in 1899 by the British.

The station is the Inter State Bus Terminal (ISBT), which is 4 1/2 kilometres (2 3/4 mi) from the bus stand and the main taxi stand.

The nearest airport to the station is the Jolly Grant Airport, about 24 kilometres (15 mi) from the station.

It is the last station on the Northern railway line in the area.

== History ==
The Haridwar–Dehradun line, which was the continuation of the branch line of Oudh and Rohilkhand Railway from Laksar on the main line to Haridwar, was opened in 1900. Dehradun was the terminus of this 77 km (48 mi) long line. The railway track between Haridwar and Dehradun was sanctioned on 18 November 1896. It was constructed between 1897 and 1899, and was opened for rail traffic on 1 March 1900. The construction of the railway station had a huge impact on the town of Dehra. Pensioners, European settlers and several other people were attracted to the town due to its pleasant climate. The railway line provided them easy connectivity to other parts of India. The railway line was also responsible for the steep increase in the export of rice, timber and limestone from the town.

There were plans to further extend railway services from this railway station to Mussoorie. The first attempt in this regard was made in 1896 but could not succeed. The project was initiated again in 1921, when the Mussoorie Electric Tramway Company Ltd was formed to set up a tram line from Dehradun to Mussoorie. The tram line was to start from the railway station and reach Mussoorie passing through Rajpur road, Dilaram Bazaar, Rajpur, Makherti, Oak-Grove, Fairlawn and Barlowganj. Work began and two stations were built on the line: one in Dilaram Bazaar and another near Parade Ground. The project was then scheduled to be completed by 1925 at an estimated cost of Rs 36 lakh, however the prices were expected to come down by 30 to 40% due to a steep fall in iron and steel prices at that time. But the tunnel at Jharipani is supposed to have caved in, killing a few workers. This combined with political unrest and the alleged embezzlement of funds by company officials eventually lead to the project being abandoned.

== Renovation ==
The station was renovated in 2019–20, when re-modelling of the station complex and construction of additional platforms was undertaken. The station was closed on 10 November 2019 and was then reopened on 8 February 2020. During this period, the Dehradun-bound trains used to terminate either at Haridwar or at Harrawala, about 12 km (7 mi) from the city.

Various signages and maps were also introduced in Braille in order to make the station friendly for visually challenged persons.

== Gallery ==
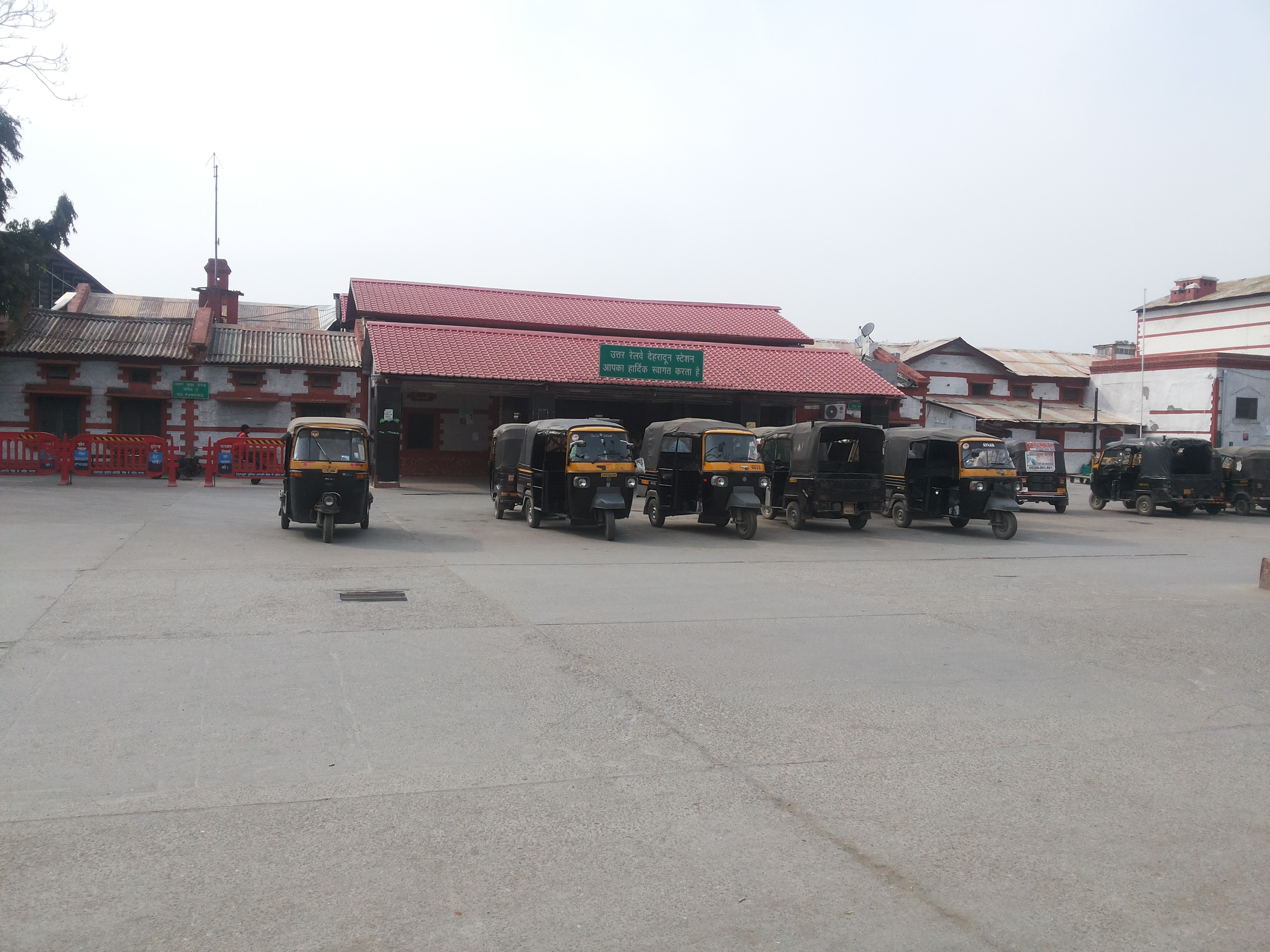
Railway Station outside view

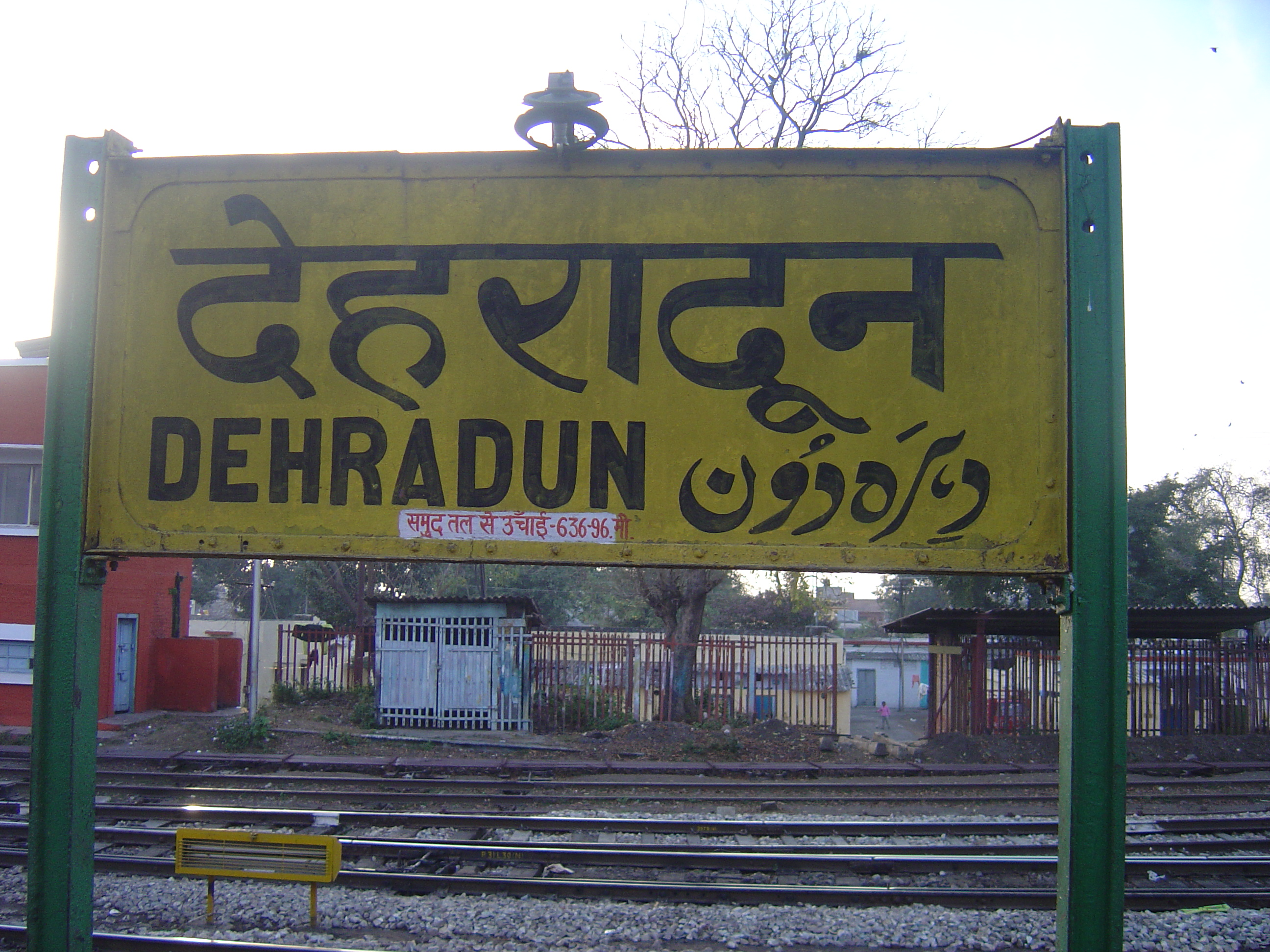
Dehradun Railway Station Board
