= Dehradun–Anand Vihar Terminal Vande Bharat Express =

Mini Vande Bharat Express train route in India

Dehradun Terminal – Anand Vihar Terminal Vande Bharat Express

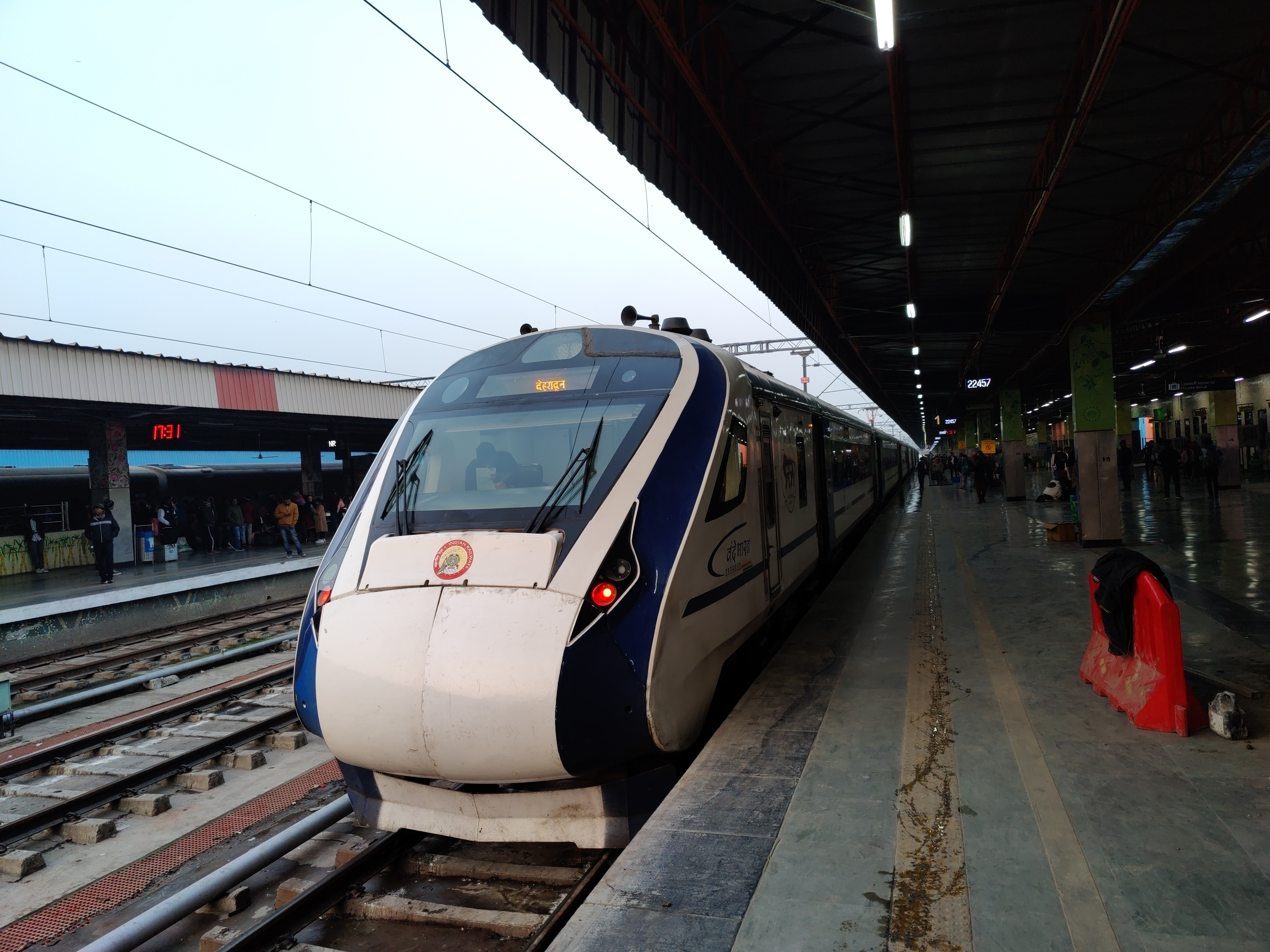
- Dehradun-Anand Vihar Vande Bharat Express at Anand Vihar Terminal

Overview
- Service type: Vande Bharat Express
- Locale: Uttarakhand, Uttar Pradesh and New Delhi
- First service: 25 May 2023 (Inaugural run); 29 May 2023; 3 years ago (Commercial run)
- Current operator: Northern Railways (NR)

Route
- Termini: Dehradun Terminal (DDN); Anand Vihar Terminal (ANVT)
- Stops: 6
- Distance travelled: 302 km (188 mi)
- Average journey time: 04hrs 45mins
- Service frequency: Six days a week (Note: Except Wednesdays)
- Train number: 22458 / 22457
- Lines used: Dehradun–Laksar line; Moradabad–Ambala line (till Saharanpur Jn.); Saharanpur–Meerut–Delhi line

On-board services
- Classes: AC Chair Car, AC Executive Chair Car
- Seating arrangements: Airline style; Rotatable seats
- Sleeping arrangements: No
- Catering facilities: On-board catering
- Observation facilities: Large windows in all coaches
- Entertainment facilities: On-board WiFi; Infotainment System; Electric outlets; Reading light; Seat Pockets; Bottle Holder; Tray Table
- Baggage facilities: Overhead racks
- Other facilities: Kavach

Technical
- Rolling stock: Mini Vande Bharat 2.0
- Track gauge: Indian gauge 1,676 mm (5 ft 6 in) broad gauge
- Electrification: 25 kV 50 Hz AC Overhead line
- Operating speed: 64 km/h (40 mph) (Avg.) 110 km/h (68 mph) (Max)
- Average length: 192 metres (630 ft) (08 coaches)
- Track owner: Indian Railways

The 22458/22457 Dehradun Terminal–Anand Vihar Terminal Vande Bharat Express is India's 17th Vande Bharat Express train, connecting the states of Uttarakhand, Uttar Pradesh and New Delhi.

== Overview ==
This train is operated by Indian Railways, by starting the journey from Uttarakhand's Dehradun Terminal and terminating at New Delhi's Anand Vihar Terminal. It will later return to Dehradun on the same evening.

== Rakes ==
It is the fifteenth 2nd Generation and the third Mini Vande Bharat 2.0 Express train which was designed and manufactured by the Integral Coach Factory at Perambur, Chennai under the Make in India Initiative.

== Service ==
The 22457/22458 Anand Vihar Terminal - Dehradun Vande Bharat Express operates six days a week except Thursdays, covering a distance of 302 km (188 mi) in a travel time of 4 hours with an average speed of 64 km/h (40 mph). The service has 6 intermediate stops. The Maximum Permissible Speed is 130 km/h (81 mph).

== Gallery ==
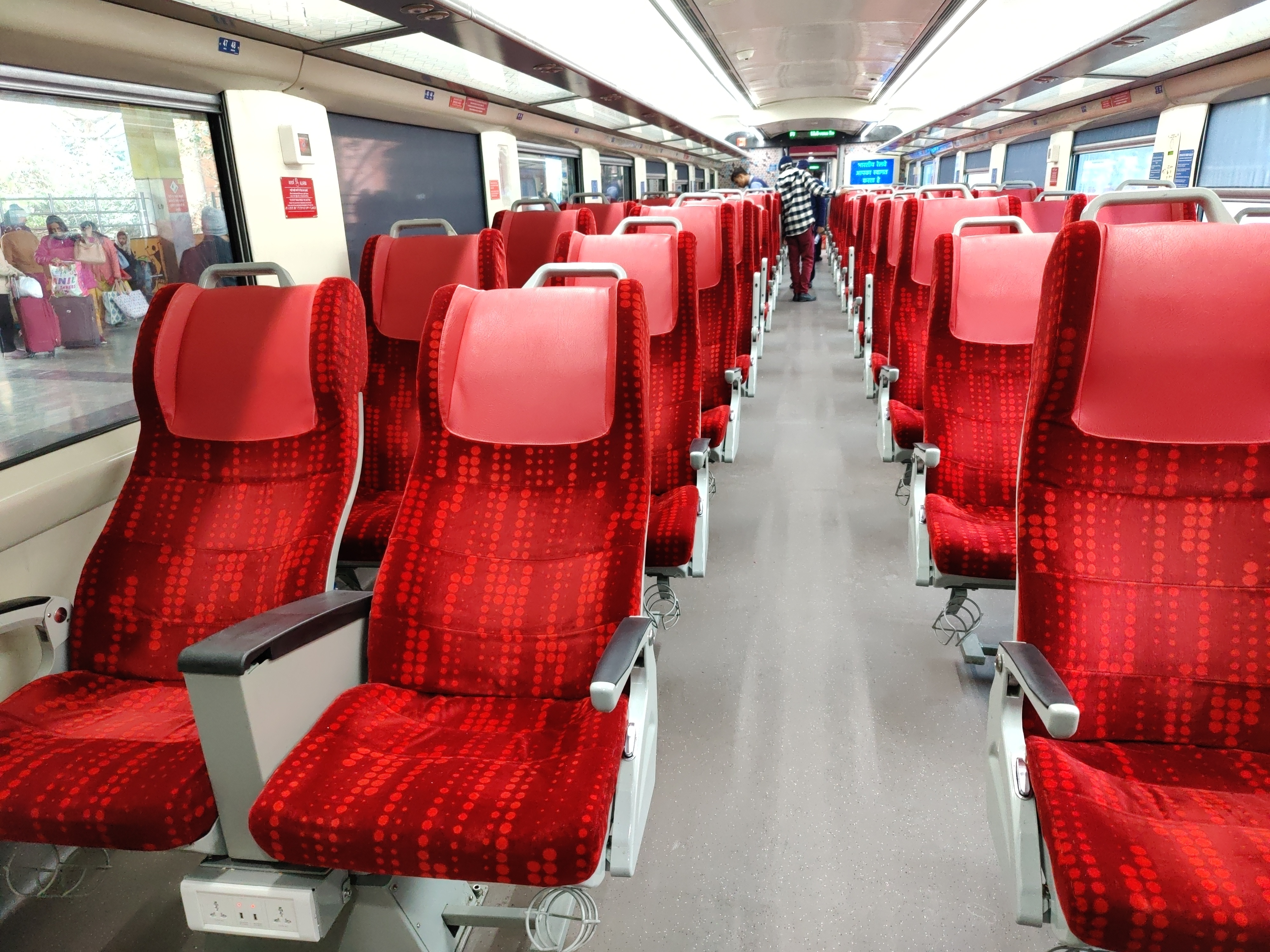

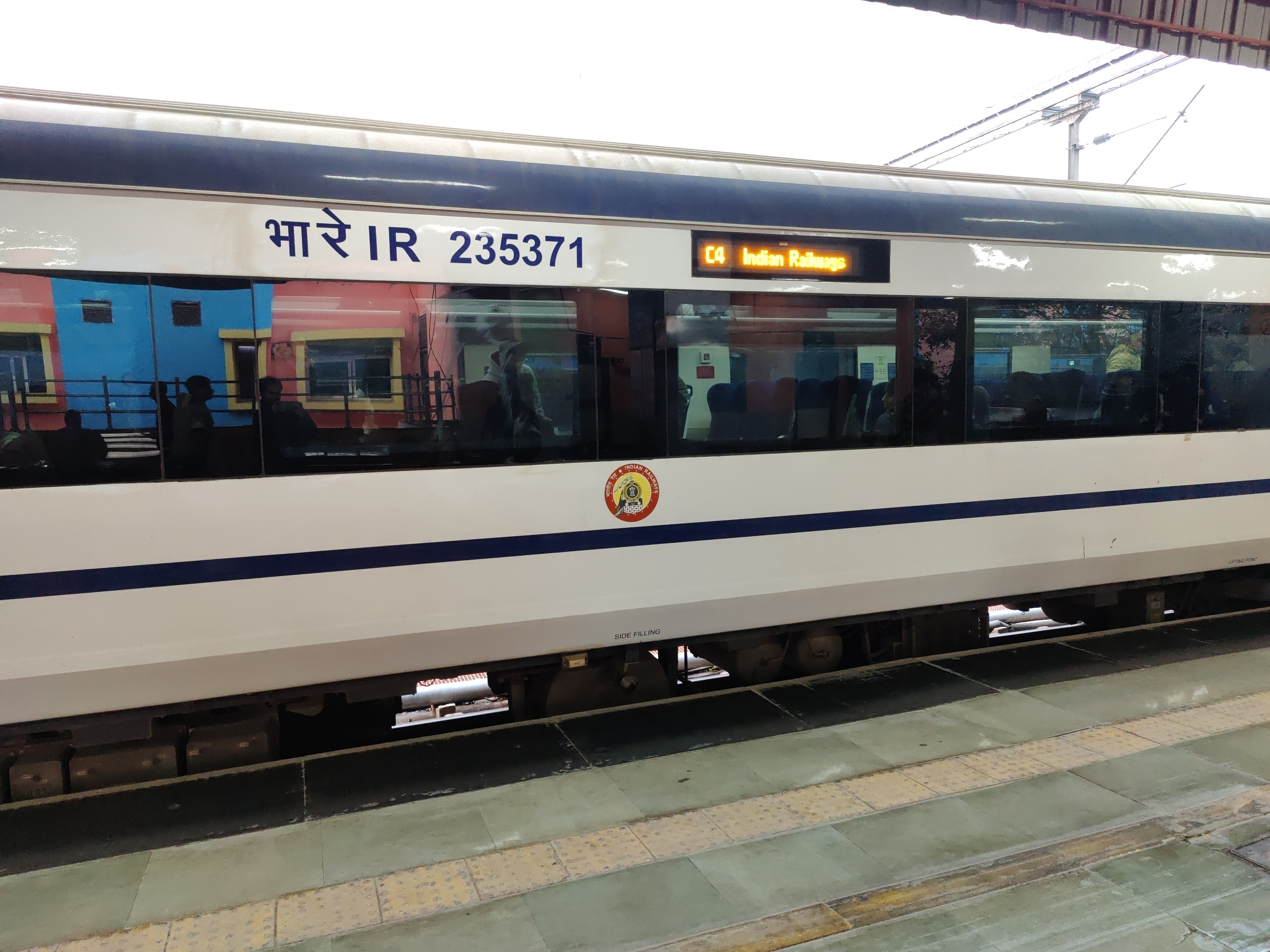
Coaches of Dehradun–Anand Vihar Terminal Vande Bharat Express

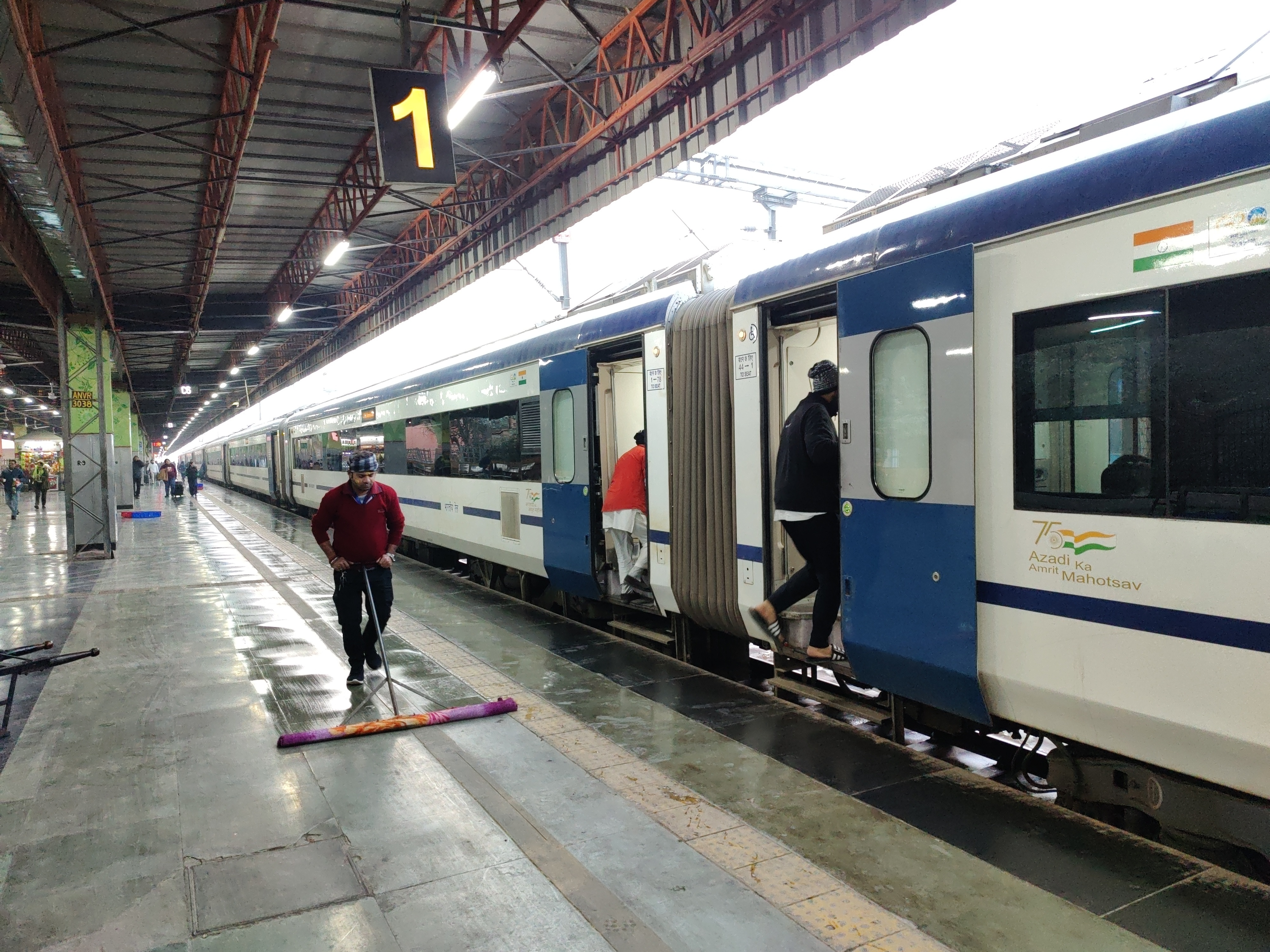
Dehradun–Anand Vihar Terminal Vande Bharat Express at Anand Vihar Terminal.

== See also ==
- Vande Bharat Express
- Gatimaan Express
- Tejas Express
- Dehradun railway station
- Anand Vihar Terminal railway station
