= Raiwala Junction railway station =

Railway Station in Uttarakhand, India

Raiwala Junction
- Indian Railways logo

General information
- Location: NH 58, Junction Point, Raiwala, Uttarakhand; India
- Coordinates: 30.0318°N 78.2096°E
- Elevation: 355 metres (1,165 ft)
- System: Junction
- Owner: Indian Railways
- Line: Laksar–Dehradun line
- Platforms: 2
- Tracks: 4 (Completed)
- Connections: Auto stand

Construction
- Structure type: Standard (on-ground station)
- Parking: No
- Cycle facilities: No

Other information
- Status: Functioning
- Station code: RWL
- Zone(s): Northern railway
- Division(s): Moradabad

History
- Electrified: Completed
Location
- Location within India Location within Uttarakhand

Raiwala Junction railway station (code RWL) is a railway station at Raiwala and a junction to Dehradun and Rishikesh stations. It is a significant but small railway station in Dehradun district, Uttarakhand with minimal facilities. The highway is less than under 500 meters from the station. The station consists of two platforms. The platforms are not well sheltered. It lacks many facilities including advanced ticket reservation counter and sanitation.

== Gallery ==
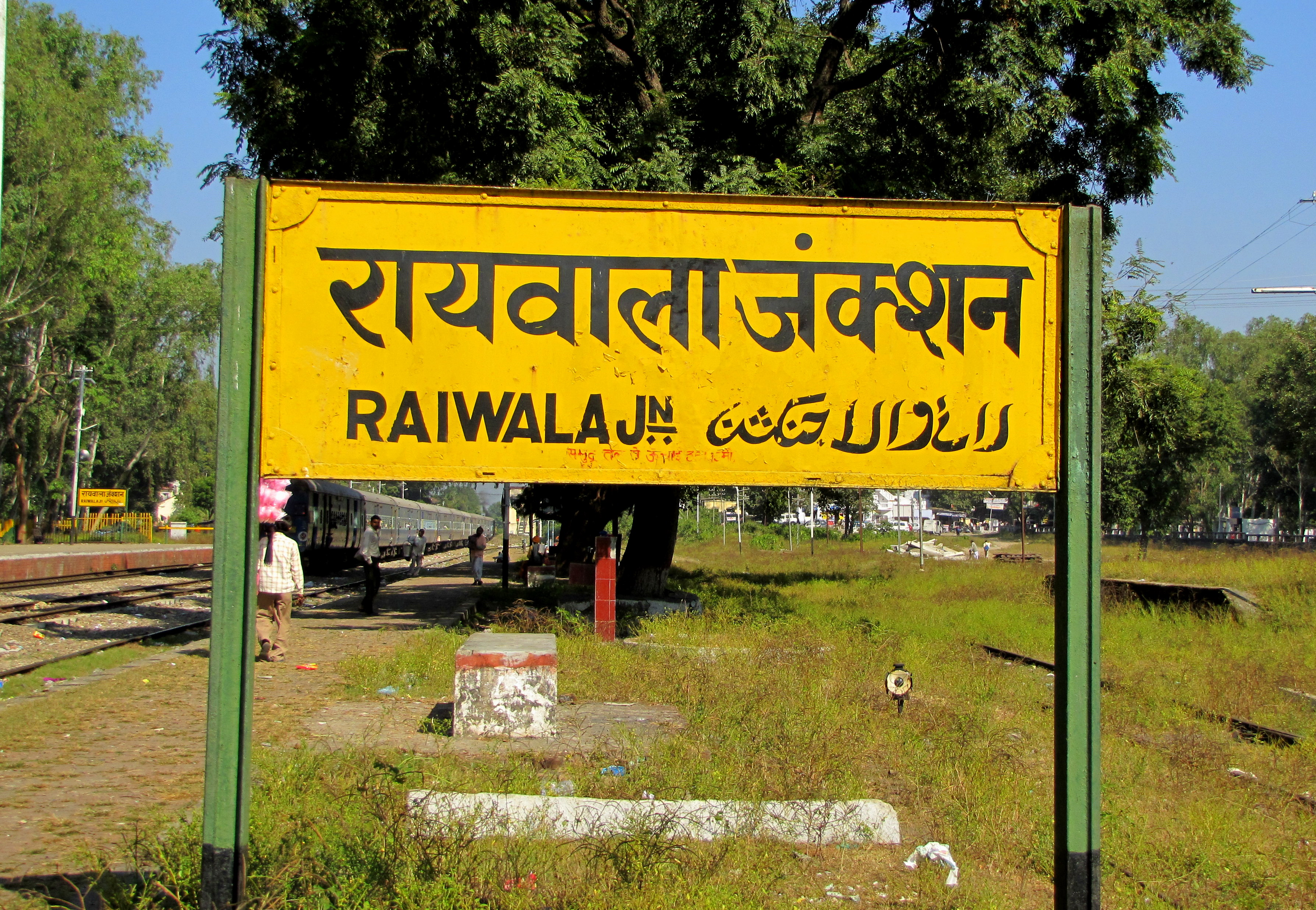
Raiwala Junction train station
