= Haridwar–Jammu Tawi Express =

Express train in India

Haridwar – Jammu Tawi Express

Overview
- Service type: Express
- First service: 14 August 2016; 9 years ago
- Current operator: Northern Railways

Route
- Termini: Haridwar; Jammu Tawi
- Stops: 13
- Distance travelled: 535 km (332 mi)
- Average journey time: 11 hours 28 mins
- Service frequency: Weekly
- Train number: 14605 / 14606

On-board services
- Classes: AC 1st Class, AC 2 tier, AC 3 tier, Sleeper, General
- Sleeping arrangements: Yes
- Catering facilities: No Pantry Car Coach attached

Technical
- Rolling stock: ICF coach
- Track gauge: 1,676 mm (5 ft 6 in)
- Operating speed: 140 km/h (87 mph) maximum,47 km/h (29 mph), including halts

Haridwar – Jammu Tawi Express is an Express train belonging to Northern Railway zone of Indian Railways that run between Haridwar and Jammu Tawi in India.

== Background ==
This train was inaugurated on 14 August 2016, from Jammu Tawi flagged off by Suresh Prabhu, Former Minister of Railways by using video conferencing from Mumbai for more connectivity between Haridwar and Jammu tawi.

== Service ==
Frequency of this train is weekly and it covers the distance of 535 km with an average speed of 47 km/h on both sides.

== Routes ==
This train passes through Saharanpur Junction, Ambala Cantonment Junction, Ludhiana Junction, Jalandhar Cantonment Junction on both sides.

== Traction ==
As the route is fully electrified an WAP-4 and WAP-7 pulls the train to its destination on both sides.
