= Prayagraj–Haridwar Express =

Train in India

Prayag Ghat Haridwar Express
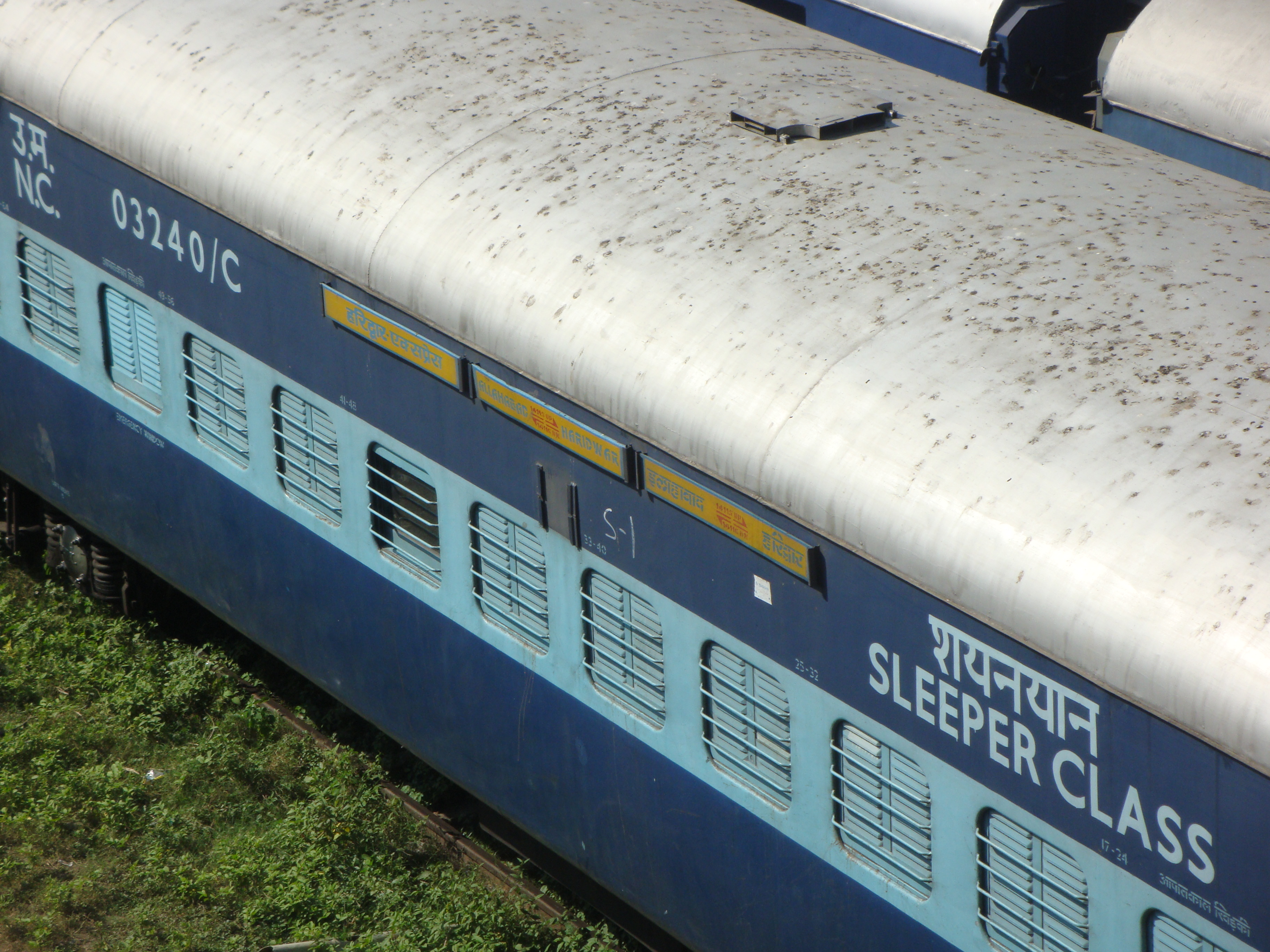

Overview
- Service type: Express
- Current operator: North Central Railways

Route
- Termini: Prayag Ghat Railway station Haridwar Junction
- Stops: 13
- Distance travelled: 725 km (450 mi)
- Average journey time: 14 hours 40 minutes as 14115 Prayagraj Haridwar Express, 15 hours 20 minutes as 14116 Haridwar Prayagraj Express.
- Service frequency: 3 days a week. 14115 Prayagraj Haridwar Express – Tuesday, Thursday & Sunday. 14116 Haridwar Prayagraj Express – Monday, Wednesday & Friday.
- Train number: 14115/14116

On-board services
- Classes: AC 2 tier, AC 3 tier, Sleeper Class, Second Class seating
- Seating arrangements: Yes
- Sleeping arrangements: Yes
- Catering facilities: No Pantry car coach attached

Technical
- Rolling stock: Standard Indian Railways coaches
- Track gauge: 1,676 mm (5 ft 6 in)
- Operating speed: 110 km/h (68 mph) maximum 48.33 km/h (30 mph), including halts

The 14229/14230 Prayagraj Haridwar Express is an Express train belonging to Indian Railways - North Central Railway zone that runs between Prayagraj Junction and Haridwar Junction in India.

It operates as train number 14229 from Prayagraj Junction to Haridwar Junction and as train number 14230 in the reverse direction, serving the states of Uttar Pradesh and Uttarakhand.

== Coaches ==
14115/16 Prayagraj Haridwar Express presently has 1 AC 2-tier, 1 AC 3-tier, 6 Sleeper Class, 6 Second Class seating, and 2 SLR (Seating cum Luggage Rake) coaches. It does not have a Pantry car coach.

As is customary with most train services in India, Coach Composition may be amended at the discretion of Indian Railways depending on demand.

== Service ==
The 14115 Prayagraj Haridwar Express covers the distance of 725 kilometres in 14 hours 40 mins (49.43 km/h) and in 15 hours 20 mins as 14116 Haridwar Prayagraj Express (47.28 km/h).

As the average speed of the train is below 55 km/h, as per Indian Railways rules, its fare does not include a superfast surcharge.

== Routeing ==
The 14115 / 16 Prayag Ghat Haridwar Express runs from Prayag Ghat Railway Station via Lucknow Junction, Hardoi, Shahjehanpur, Bareilly Junction, Najibabad Junction to Haridwar Junction.

== Traction ==
As the route is fully electrified, a WAP 4 locomotive from the Lucknow shed powers the train for its entire journey.

== Timings ==
14115 Prayagraj Haridwar Express leaves Prayagraj Junction every Tuesday, Thursday & Sunday at 23:35 hrs IST and reaches Haridwar Junction at 14:15 hrs IST the next day.

14116 Haridwar Prayagraj Express leaves Haridwar Junction every Monday, Wednesday, and Friday at 16:25 hrs IST and reaches Prayagraj Junction at 07:45 hrs IST the next day.
