= Moradabad railway division =

Railway division of India

Moradabad railway division is one of the six railway divisions under the jurisdiction of Northern Railway zone of the Indian Railways. It was formed in 1899 and its headquarter are located at Moradabad in the state of Uttar Pradesh.

Delhi railway division, Firozpur railway division, Lucknow NR railway division and Ambala railway division are the other railway divisions under NR Zone headquartered at New Delhi.

== List of railway stations and towns ==
The list includes the stations under the Moradabad railway division and their station category.

Category of station	No. of stations	Names of stations
A-1	6	Najibabad Junction Railway Station, Bareilly Junction, Haridwar Junction railway, Dehradun, Rishikesh
A	9	Chandausi, Hapur, Hardoi, Laksar Junction, Moradabad, Rampur Junction, Roorkee, Shahjahanpur, Roza Junction, Bijnor, Seohara.
B	1	Gajraula Junction
C suburban station	-	-
D	-	-
E	-	-
F halt station	-	-
Total	-	-
