= Roorkee railway station =

Railway Station in Uttarakhand

Roorkee
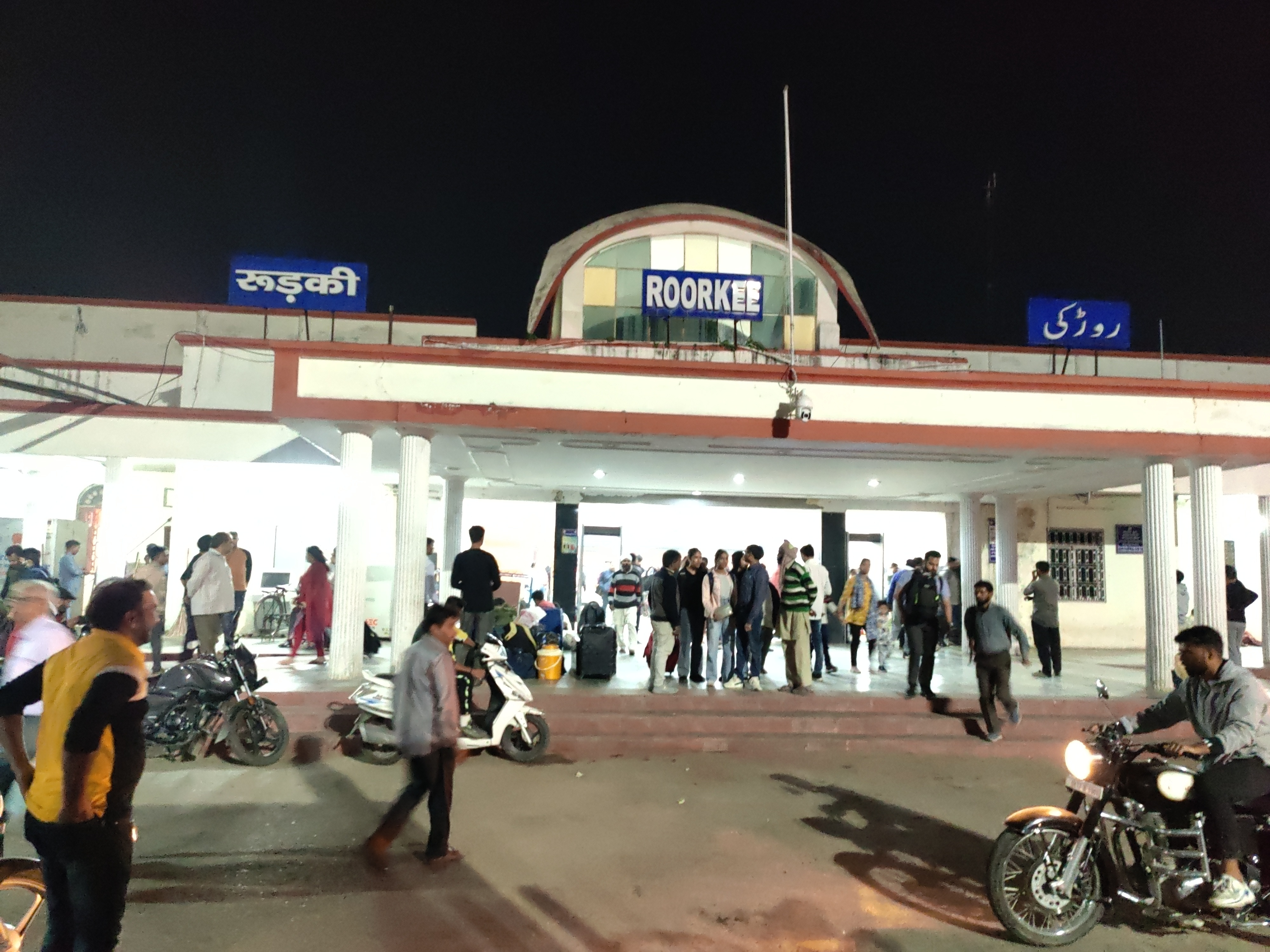
- Roorkee Junction Railway Station

General information
- Location: Railway Road, Roorkee, Uttarakhand; India
- Coordinates: 29.8523°N 77.8751°E
- Elevation: 268.000 metres (879.265 ft)
- System: Indian Railways station
- Owner: Indian Railways
- Operator: Northern Railway zone
- Line: Moradabad Ambala Line Deoband Roorkee Line Laksar Bypass line Saharanpur Bypass line
- Platforms: 5
- Tracks: 8

Construction
- Structure type: At grade
- Parking: Yes
- Accessible: Yes

Other information
- Status: Active
- Station code: RK
- Zone(s): Northern Railway
- Division(s): Moradabad

History
- Opened: 1862
Location
- Location within Uttarakhand Location within India

Roorkee railway station is a junction railway station in Haridwar district, Uttarakhand, India. Its code is RK. It serves Roorkee city. The station consists of five platforms. Roorkee is one of the largest railway stations in Uttarakhand. It is located in Moradabad Ambala Railway Line other lines are Deoband Roorkee Line, Laksar Bypass line and Saharanpur Bypass line also called as Direct line to Tapri Junction. It is also the third largest Junction station in Uttarakhand.

== Gallery ==
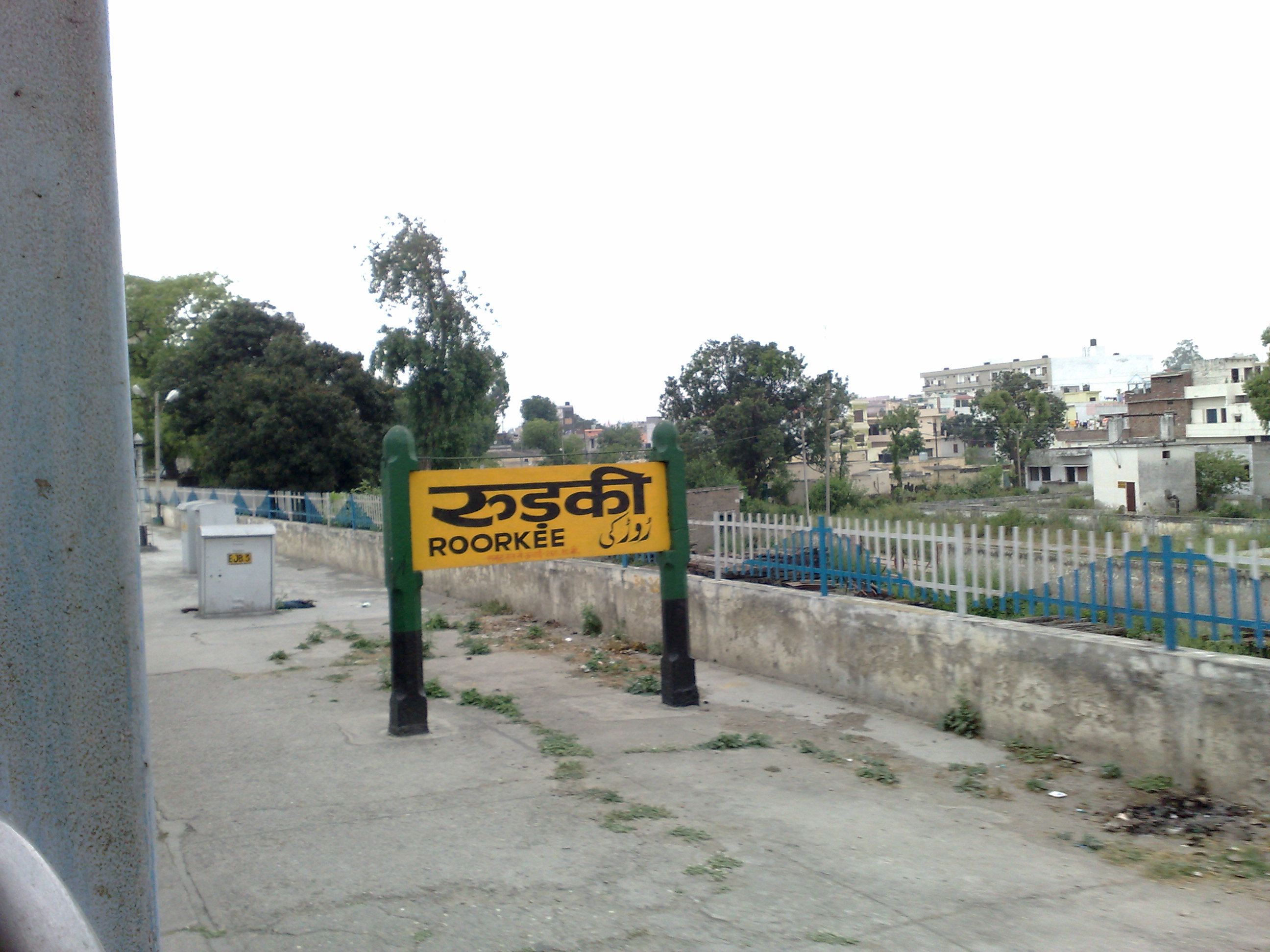
Roorkee railway station
