= Meerut Cantt railway station =

Railway Station in Uttar Pradesh, India

Meerut Cantt. railway station
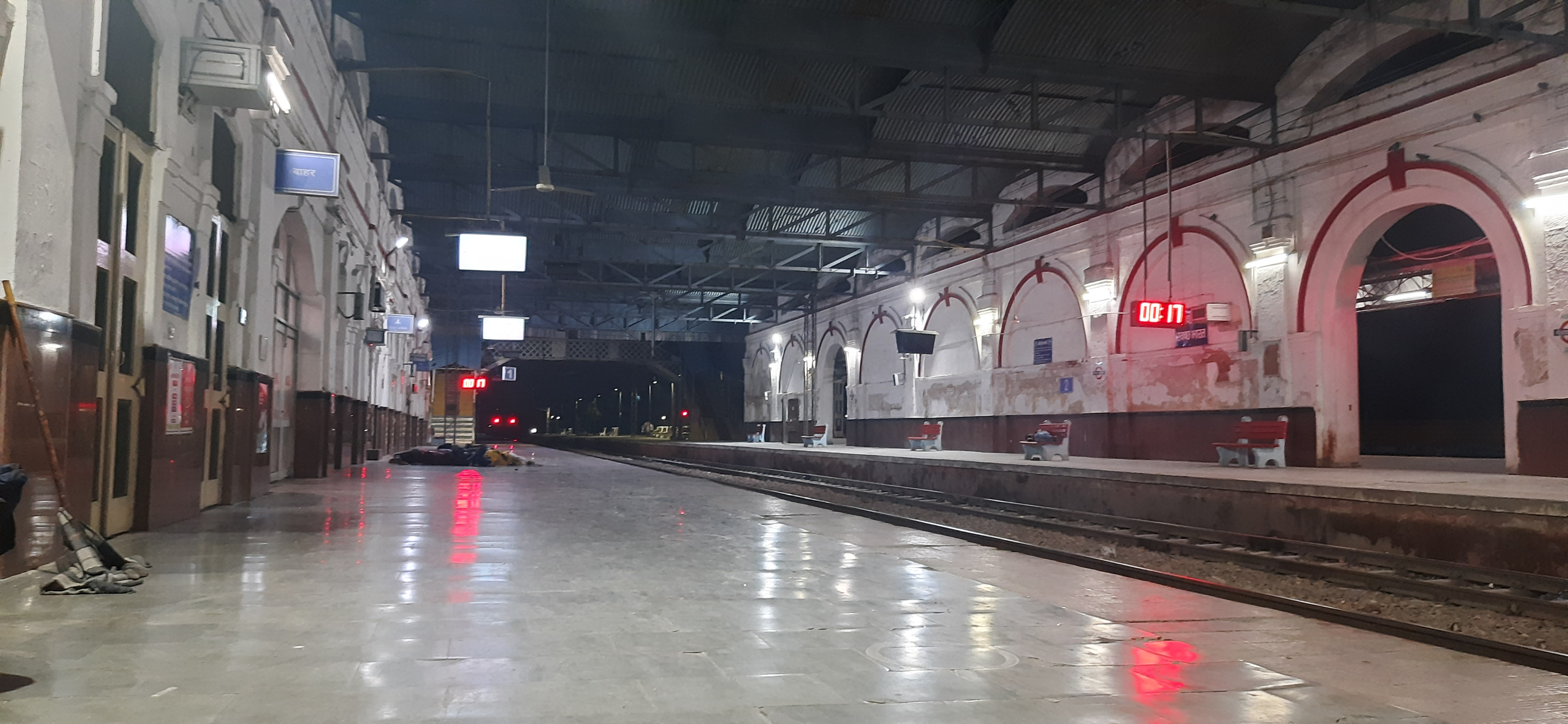
- Meerut Cantt railway station

General information
- Location: Meerut, Uttar Pradesh; India
- Coordinates: 29°00′59″N 77°41′13″E
- Elevation: 229 metres (751 ft)
- System: Indian Railways station Passenger Station
- Owner: Ministry of Railways (India)
- Operator: Indian Railways
- Platforms: 3
- Tracks: 8

Construction
- Structure type: At grade
- Parking: Available
- Accessible: Yes

Other information
- Status: Functioning
- Station code: MUT
- Zone(s): Northern Railway
- Division(s): Delhi

Services
Preceding station	Indian Railways	Following station
Meerut City towards ?	Delhi–Meerut–Saharanpur line	Pabli Khas towards ?
Location
- Location within Uttar Pradesh

Meerut Cantt (code: MUT), is a railway station in the city of Meerut. It lies on Delhi–Meerut–Saharanpur line in Delhi division of Northern Railway zone of India.

== History ==
The railway line between Old Delhi and Meerut was constructed in 1864. This station was established by British India government around 1865 after the Sepoy mutiny of 1857. It lies on the Delhi to Haridwar/Dehradun line.

== Lines and Routes ==
It lies on Delhi–Meerut–Saharanpur line that connects Delhi, Ghaziabad, Meerut, Muzaffarnagar, Saharanpur. Delhi to Meerut City is double-line and electrified while Meerut–Saharanpur section is single-electrified line. Doubling of Meerut–Saharanpur section is on full swing.

== Trains ==
A total of 35 trains halt at Meerut Cantt railway station. 1 train, Meerut Cantt–New Delhi–Rewari passenger (MNR) originate from Meerut Cantt.

Meerut City, a major railway station, is located 4 km south.

== Infrastructure ==
The station was primarily built to facilitate army movement by rail by British India Government. It has dedicated infrastructure(siding and platform) for same. The station premises also has a butt welding plant with a dedicated siding that welds small segment of rails into continuous rails.

== Gallery ==
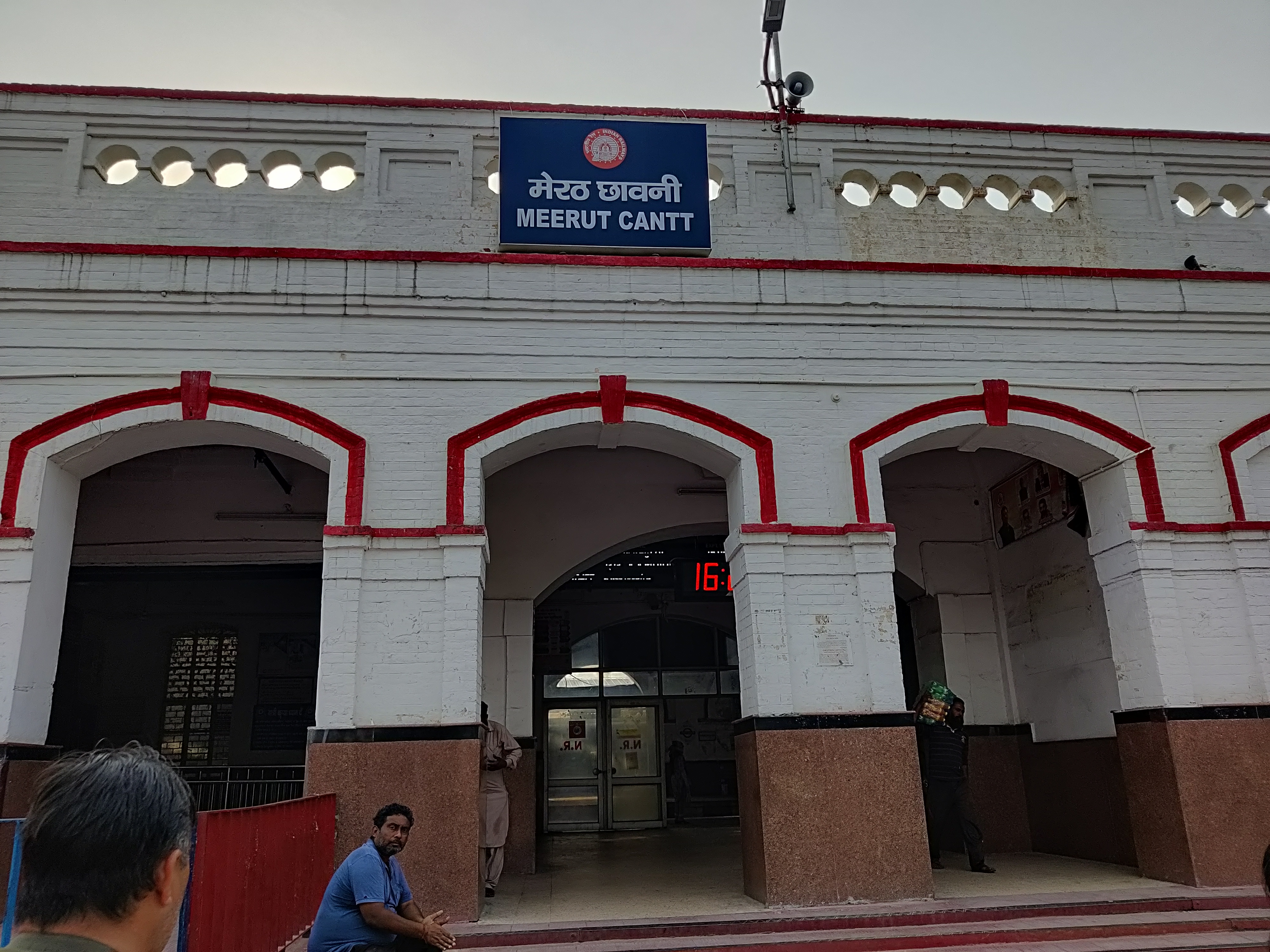
Meerut Cantt railway station entrance

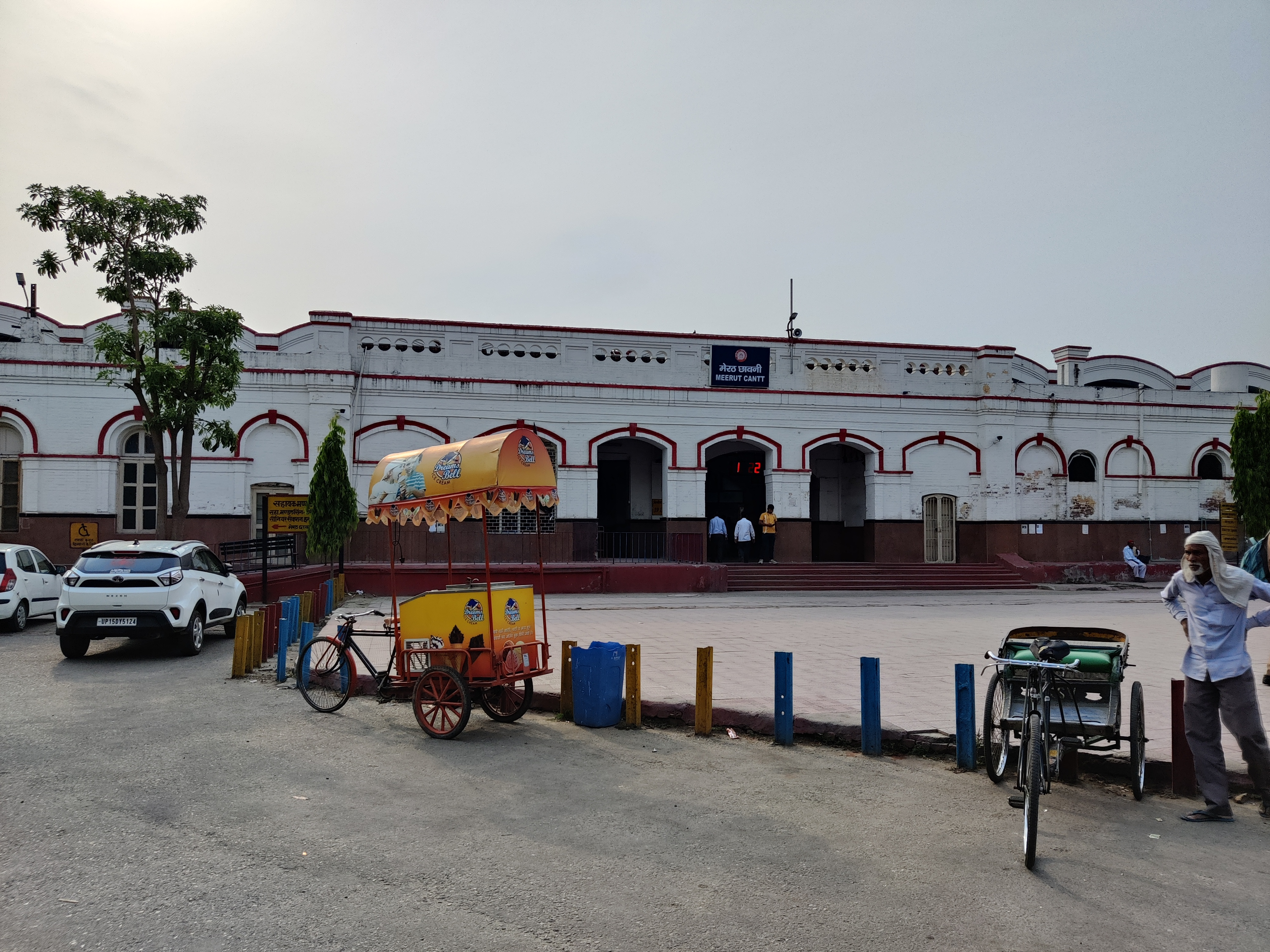
Meerut Cantt railway station from outside

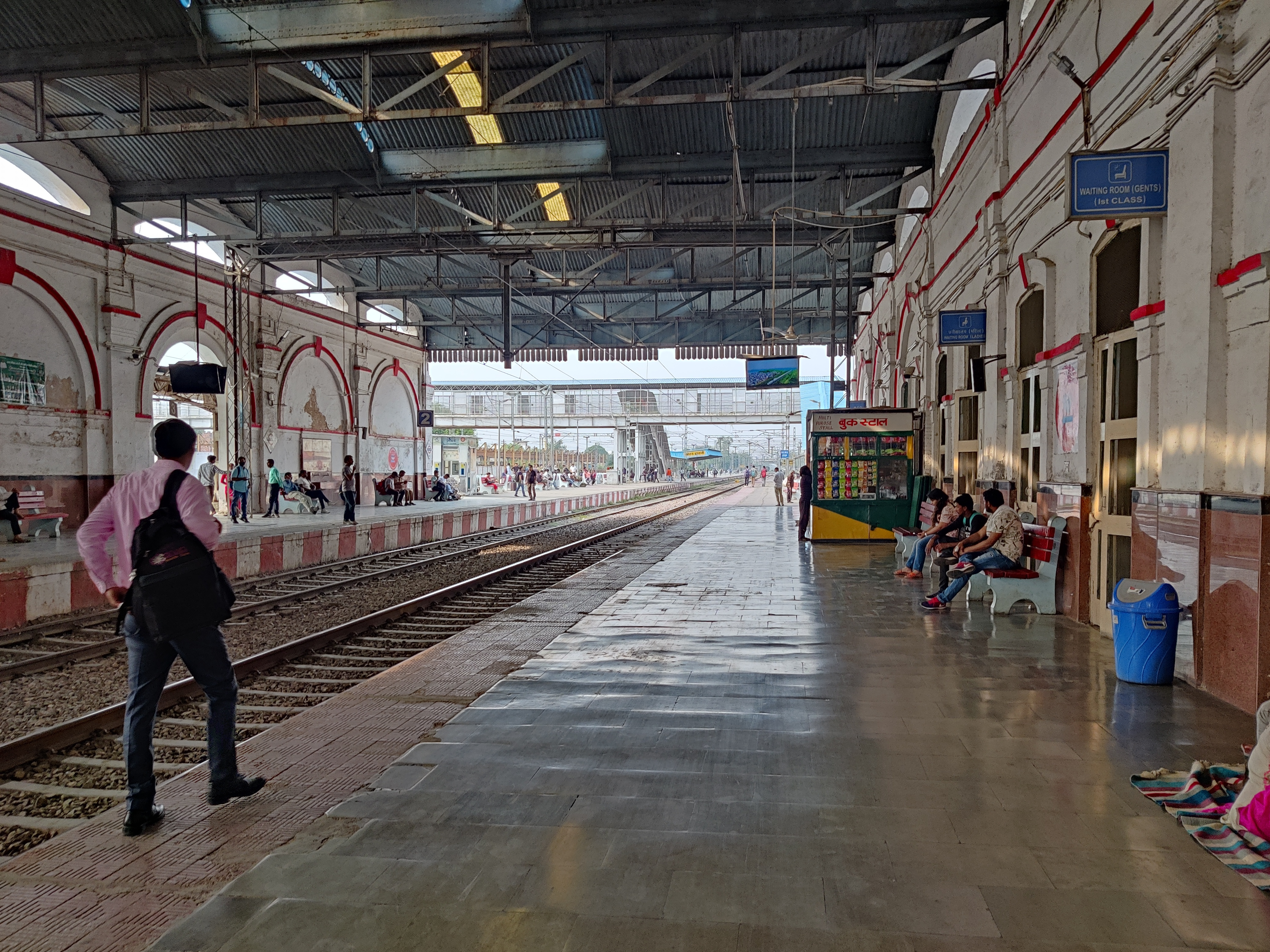
Meerut Cantt platform 1

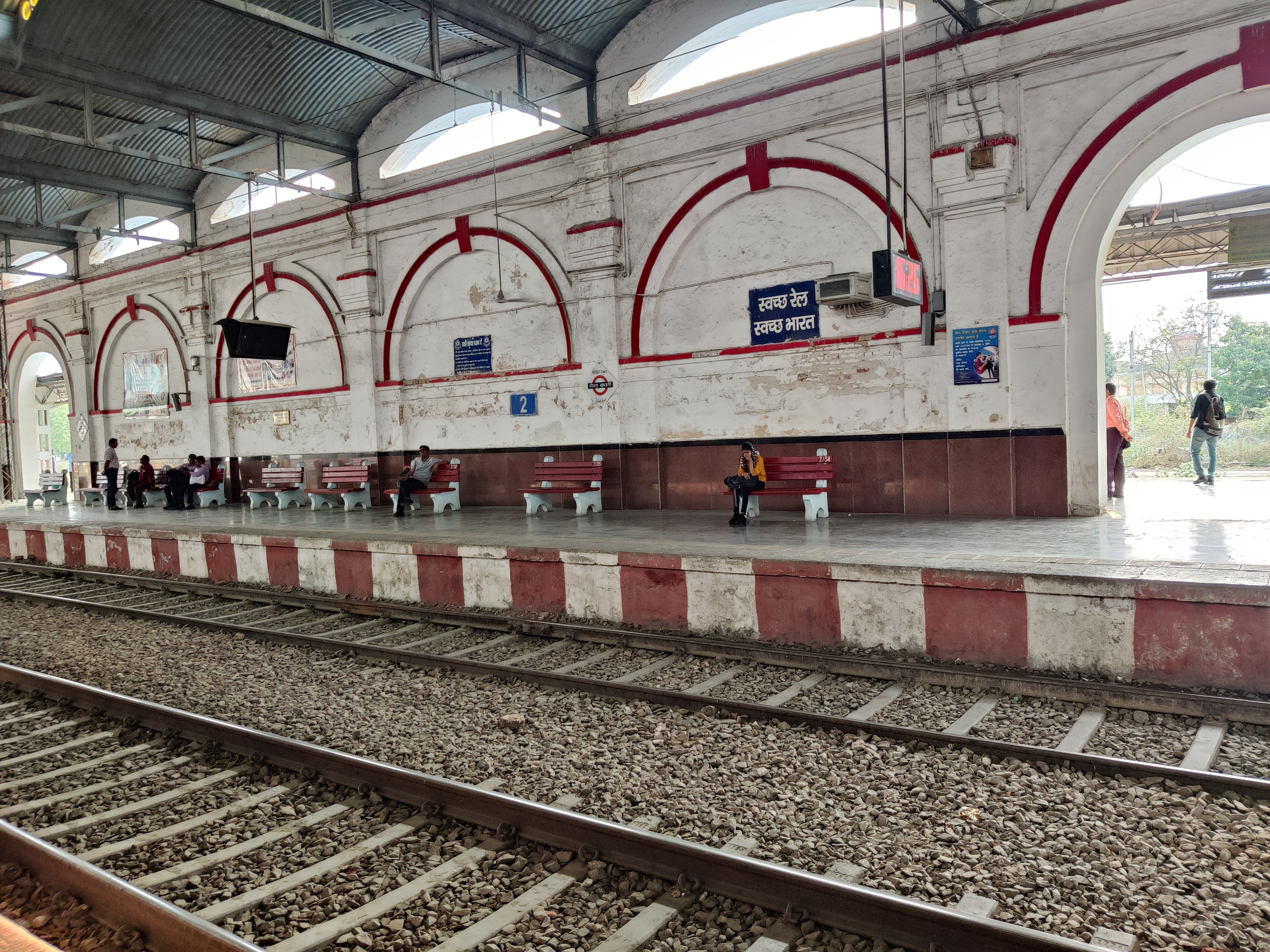
Meerut Cantt railway station inside view
