= Nauchandi Express =

Train in India

Overview
- Service type: Express
- Locale: Uttar Pradesh
- First service: 25 April 1984; 42 years ago
- Current operator: Northern Railway

Route
- Termini: Prayagraj Sangam (PYGS); Saharanpur Junction (SRE)
- Stops: 29
- Distance travelled: 771 km (479 mi)
- Average journey time: 16 hours 50 minutes
- Service frequency: Daily
- Train number: 14241 / 14242

On-board services
- Classes: AC 2 tier, AC 3 tier, Sleeper Class, General Unreserved
- Seating arrangements: Yes
- Sleeping arrangements: Yes
- Catering facilities: On-board catering, E-catering
- Observation facilities: Large windows
- Baggage facilities: No
- Other facilities: Below the seats

Technical
- Rolling stock: LHB coach
- Track gauge: 1,676 mm (5 ft 6 in)
- Operating speed: 110 km/h (68 mph) maximum, may increase upto 130km/h 46 km/h (29 mph) average including halts.

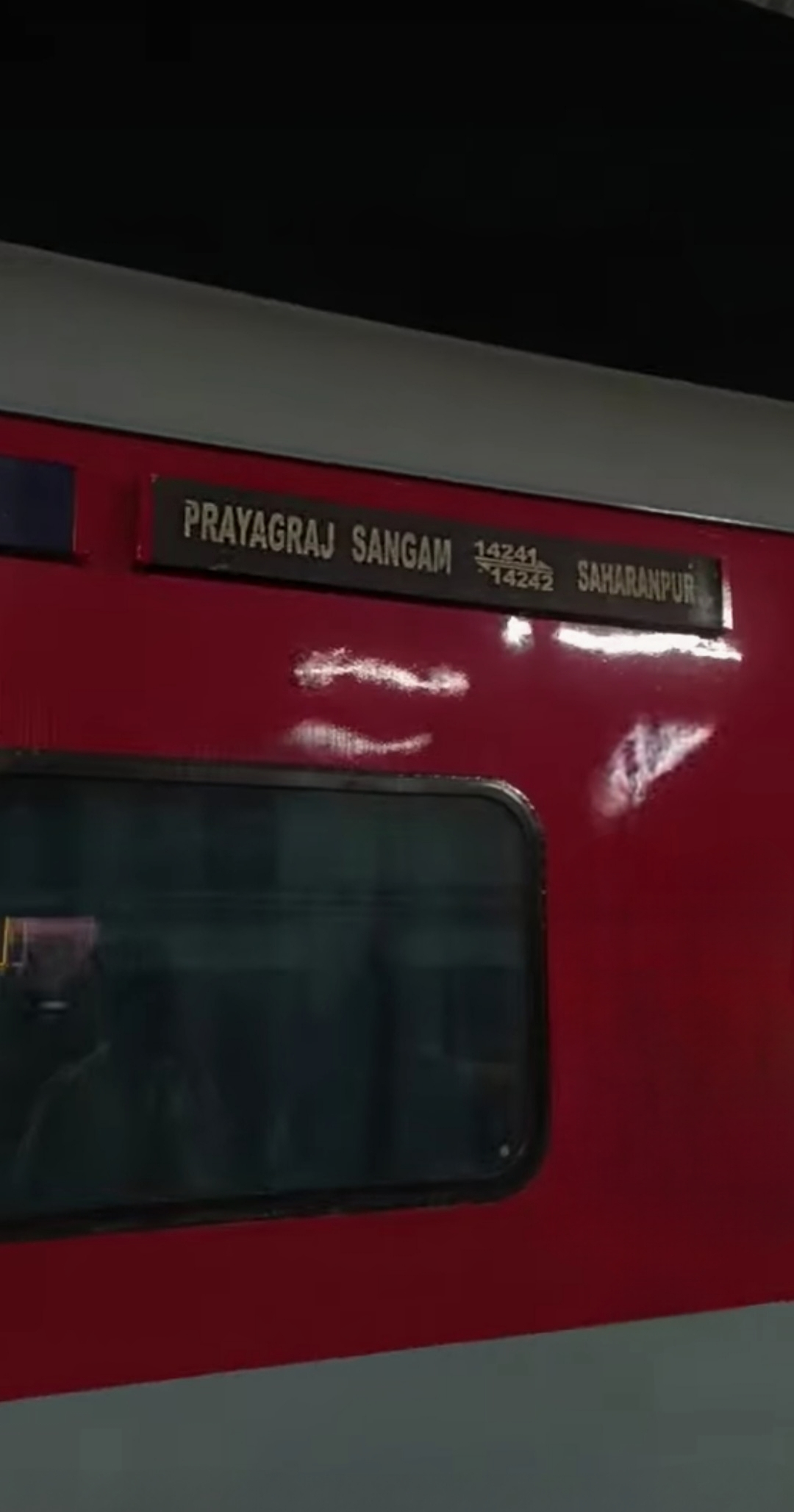
Nauchandi express LHB Coach

The 14241 / 14242 Nauchandi Express is an express train belonging to Indian Railways that runs between Prayagraj Sangam railway station and Saharanpur Junction in India.

It operates as train number 14241 from Prayagraj Sangam station(station code: PYGS) to Saharanpur Junction and as train number 14242 in the reverse direction.

It is named after the Nauchandi Temple in Meerut. Earlier this train used to run from Allahabad Junction to Meerut City Junction and then later extended to Saharanpur Junction. Now it runs from Prayagraj Sangam station to Saharanpur Junction. The train 14241 has LHB Railways gives gift to the people of Uttar Pradesh, these 2 trains will be fitted with LHB coaches; they will get relief from jolts. 22 coaches that goes continue towards Saharanpur Junction. 14242 starts from Saharanpur Junction and goes to Prayagraj Sangam.

== Coaches ==
The 14241 / 14242 Nauchandi Express presently has 2 AC 2 tier, 6 AC 3 tier economy, 1 First class AC 1 tier, 7 Sleeper Class and 4 General Unreserved coaches, 1 Luggage‑cum‑Divyang Coach, 1 Power Generator coach.

LSLRD – 1, LWS – 2, LWSCN – 7, LWACCN – 6, LWACCW – 2, LWFAC – 1, LWS – 2, LWLRRM – 1 Total = 22 LHB coaches

As with most train services in India, Coach Composition may be amended at the discretion of Indian Railways depending on demand.

Slip coaches of 54402/05 Khurja Passenger are attached/detached at Hapur.

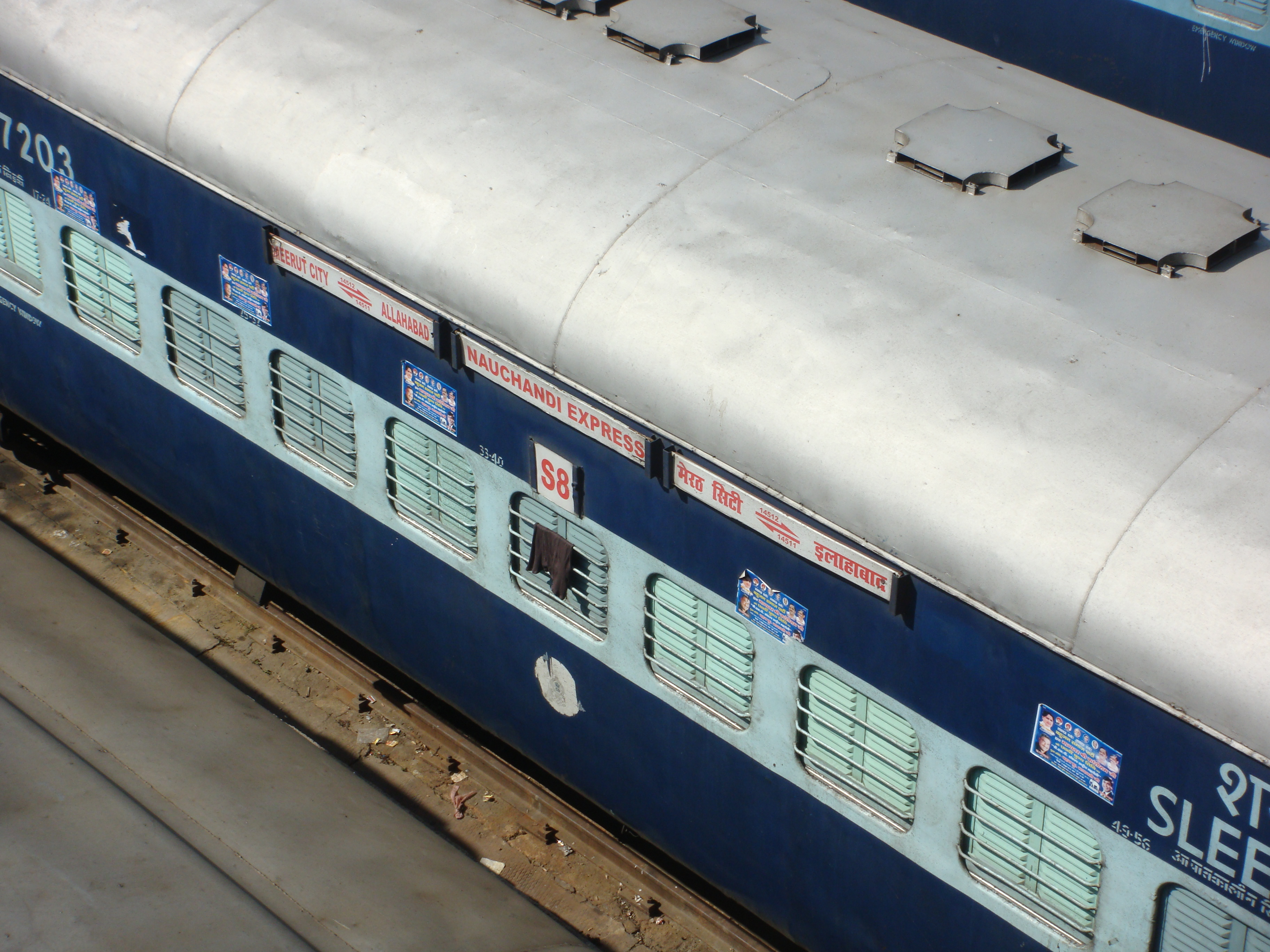
14241 - Nauchandi Express - Sleeper Class

== Service ==
The 14241 Nauchandi Express covers the distance of 774 kilometres in 18 hours 10 mins (42.61 km/h) and in 17 hours 55 mins as 14242 Nauchandi Express (45.09 km/h).

== Traction ==
It is hauled end to end by a WDM 3A engine from the Lucknow shed.

== Timetable ==
14241 Nauchandi Express leaves Prayagraj Sangam railway station every day at 17:20 hrs IST and reaches Saharanpur Junction at 10:50 hrs IST the next day.

14242 Nauchandi Express leaves Saharanpur Junction every day at 17:25 hrs IST and reaches Prayagraj Sangam railway station at 10:20 hrs IST the next day.

Station Code	Station Name	14241 - Prayagraj Sangam to Saharanpur Junction		Distance from Source in km	Day	14242 - Saharanpur Junction to Prayagraj Sangam railway station		Distance from Source in km	Day
Station Code	Station Name	Arrival	Departure	Distance from Source in km	Day	Arrival	Departure	Distance from Source in km	Day
PYGS	Prayagraj Sangam	Source	17:20	0	1	10:20	Destination	774	2
LKO	Lucknow NR	22:05	22:15	197.8	1	05:00	05:10	573	2
HRI	Hardoi	23:53	23:55	299	2	03:08	03:10	471	2
SPN	Shahjehanpur	00:51	00:53	362	2	02:12	02:14	409	2
BE	Bareilly	01:05	01:07	432.6	2	01:00	01:05	338	2
MB	Moradabad	03:40	03:48	522.9	2	23:03	22:55	247	1
HPU	Hapur	06:10	06:30	627	2	20:40	21:00	143	1
MTC	Meerut City	07:45	07:50	656.7	2	19:20	19:55	114	1
MOZ	Muzaffarnagar Railway Station	08:53	08:55	712.2	2	18:20	18:15	58.3	1
DBD	Deoband Railway Station	09:13	09:15	736.2	2	17:53	17:55	34.3	1
SRE	Saharanpur Junction	10:50	Destination	770.5	2	Source	17:25	0	1
