= Ghaziabad Junction railway station =

Railway Station in Uttar Pradesh, India

Ghaziabad Junction
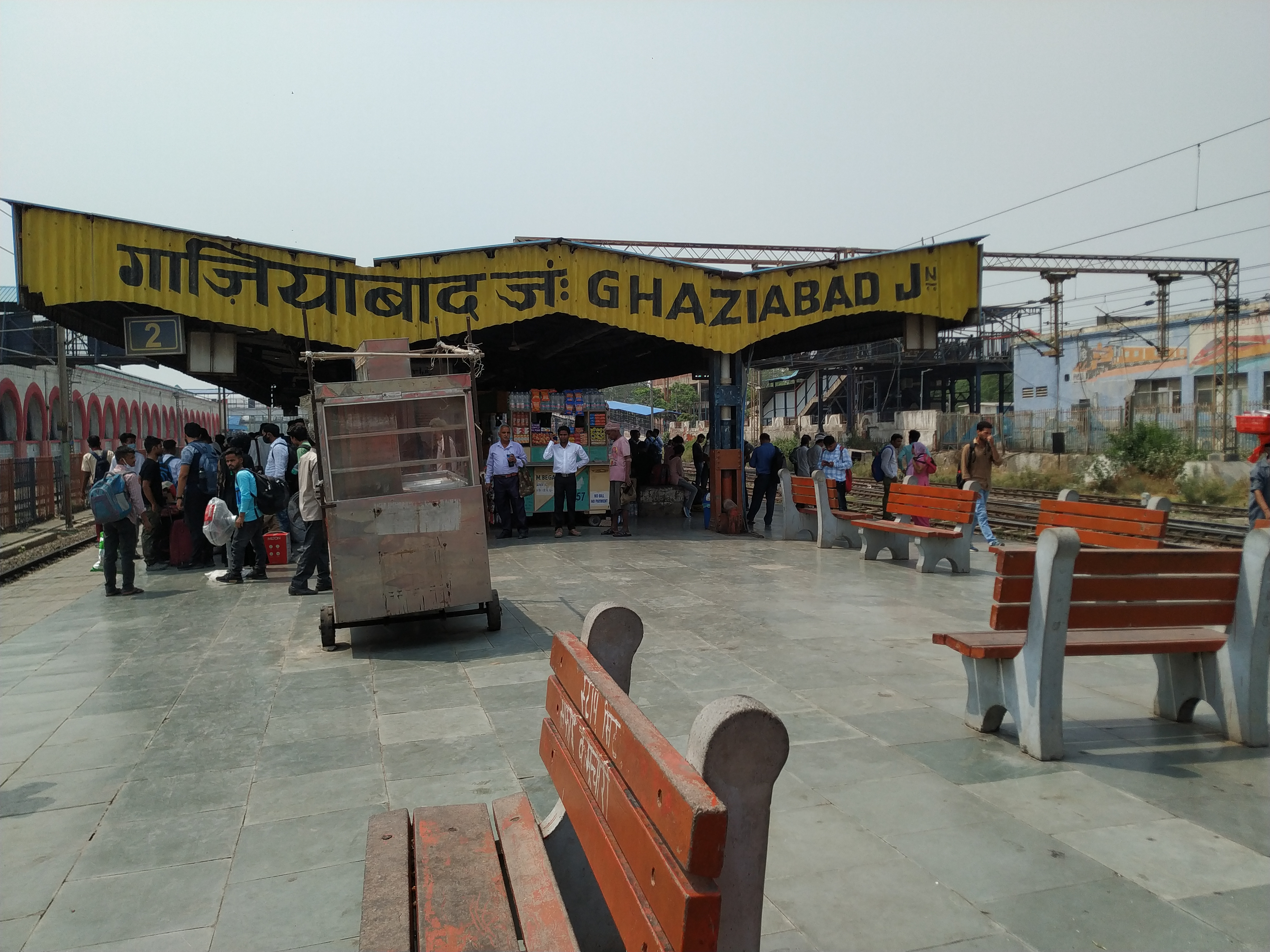
- Ghaziabad Junction railway station Platform 1.

General information
- Location: Station Road, Guru Govind Singh Marg, Ghaziabad, Uttar Pradesh; India
- Coordinates: 28°39′02″N 77°25′54″E
- Elevation: 217.00 metres (711.94 ft)
- System: Indian Railway and Delhi Suburban Railway station
- Owner: Ministry of Railways (India)
- Operator: Indian Railways
- Lines: New Delhi–Kanpur section, Delhi–Meerut–Saharanpur line, Delhi–Moradabad line
- Platforms: 6
- Tracks: 13

Construction
- Structure type: At grade
- Parking: Yes
- Cycle facilities: Yes

Other information
- Status: Functioning
- Station code: GZB
- Zone(s): Northern Railway
- Division(s): Delhi

History
- Opened: 1865–66
- Electrified: 1971–72
- Former names: East Indian Railway Company

Passengers
- 46,00,000: 5,00,000

Services
Preceding station	Indian Railways	Following station
Chipyana Buzurg towards ?	Northern Railway zone Kanpur–Delhi section	Sahibabad towards ?
Terminus	Northern Railway zone Delhi–Moradabad line	Mahrauli towards ?
Terminus	Northern Railway zone Delhi–Meerut–Saharanpur line	New Ghaziabad towards ?
Route map
Location
- Location within Uttar Pradesh
- Interactive map

Ghaziabad Junction railway station (station code: GZB) is located in Ghaziabad city of Ghaziabad district in the Indian state of Uttar Pradesh.

== History ==
In 1866, through trains via Ghaziabad station started running on the East Indian Railway Company's Howrah–Delhi line .

In 1864, Delhi-Meerut line was constructed.

In 1870, 483-kilometre-long (300 mi) Amritsar–Ambala–Saharanpur–Ghaziabad line, connecting Multan (now in Pakistan) with Delhi, was completed by the Scinde, Punjab & Delhi Railway.

In 1900, Ghaziabad–Moradabad line was completed by Oudh and Rohilkhand Railway.

In 1975–76, 1976–77, and 2016, Tundla–Aligarh–Ghaziabad line, Ghaziabad–Delhi line, Ghaziabad–Moradabad line and Ghaziabad–Roorkee–Haridwar line were respectively electrified.

In 2025-2026, Ghaziabad station underwent ₹364 crore "airport-like" multi-modal hub major redevelopment with new multi-story station building, a wide concourse, roof plaza, improved parking, and multiple foot overbridges with escalators and lifts to connect all platforms.

== Train service ==
=== Rail lines ===
Following lines run through the station: Kanpur–Delhi section of Howrah–Delhi main line, Howrah–Gaya–Delhi line, New Delhi-Meerut-Saharanpur line and New Delhi–Moradabad–Lucknow line.

=== Local suburban trains ===
Local electric trains, which run from early morning and run till midnight, are available regularly from Ghaziabad for stations in the National Capital Region. Distance: New Delhi (26 km), Old Delhi (20 km), Hazrat Nizamuddin (23 km), Anand Vihar Terminal (13 km).

== Amenities ==
Amenities for passengers at Ghaziabad include: waiting rooms, escalators, water coolers, automated teller machines, pure vegetarian restaurants, refreshment rooms, book stall, computerized reservation office, and telephone booths.

== Electric Loco Shed ==
The Ghaziabad electric locomotive shed, which serves the Delhi area, houses and maintains India's fastest locomotives 3-phase locomotives like 100+ WAP-5 & 150+ WAP-7 locomotives which are mostly used in the Rajdhani, the Shatabdi and the Duronto Expresses.

== Redevelopment under Amrit Bharat Station Scheme ==
Ghaziabad Junction was selected as part of the Ministry of Railways' flagship Amrit Bharat Station Scheme (ABSS), an initiative launched to modernize and upgrade major railway stations across India. Under this mega-redevelopment project, the station is undergoing a comprehensive transformation with a sanctioned budget of ₹337 crore, designed to upgrade the existing infrastructure into an "airport-like" multi-modal transport hub capable of managing its intense daily footfall of over 50,000 passengers.

The master plan spans across 1.5 lakh square meters and focuses on expanding structural capacity, modernizing passenger flow, and upgrading terminal amenities:

- Station Infrastructure: The single-story station layout is being transformed into a modern, three-story building complex. The blueprint includes a dedicated basement for utility services, an aesthetically redesigned glass façade, and separate executive waiting spaces.
- Concourse and Skywalk Access: A 72-meter-wide central roof plaza (air concourse) is being constructed above the tracks to smoothly manage cross-traffic between the city side and the Vijay Nagar side. This is supplemented by a 24-meter skywalk and a network of multiple foot-over bridges (FOBs)—including an 8-meter-wide primary FOB—connecting all six platforms.
- Platform Widening and Congestion Relief: To ease chronic crowding at one of northern India's busiest junctions, the Northern Railway completed extensive platform-widening works. Platforms 3/4 and 5/6 were expanded by approximately 4 meters in their middle sections and up to 2 meters at the terminal ends, covering structural lengths of 200 to 300 meters.
- Inclusivity and Accessibility: The station is being fitted with new high-capacity escalators, automatic ticket vending machines (ATVMs), lifts, and dedicated ramps to provide barrier-free navigation for elderly and Divyangjan (disabled) commuters.
- Transit Integration: Upgrades feature an expanded circulating area, modernized vehicle parking systems, and dedicated pedestrian pathways designed to seamlessly integrate the station with the nearby Ghaziabad RRTS station (Namo Bharat network) and local transit lines.
- Environmental Sustainability: The modernized layout implements green building practices, incorporating rainwater harvesting structures, dedicated sewage treatment facilities, and underground water storage systems.

=== Delays and revised timeline ===
Though initially launched in January 2023 with an original 30-month timeline targeting completion by mid-2025, the project has faced continuous delays. Because the station sits on the hyper-critical Delhi–Howrah trunk line and manages over 200 passing trains daily, executing heavy structural construction without disrupting active rail operations and daily passenger flow has presented significant brownfield engineering challenges.

By early 2026, roughly 30% to 40% of the aggregate work had been completed, largely limited to peripheral structures, staff quarters, and platform widening. Due to the initial sluggish progress and funding alignment adjustments, the Northern Railway officially pushed back and reset the final project completion deadline to January 2027.

== Gallery ==
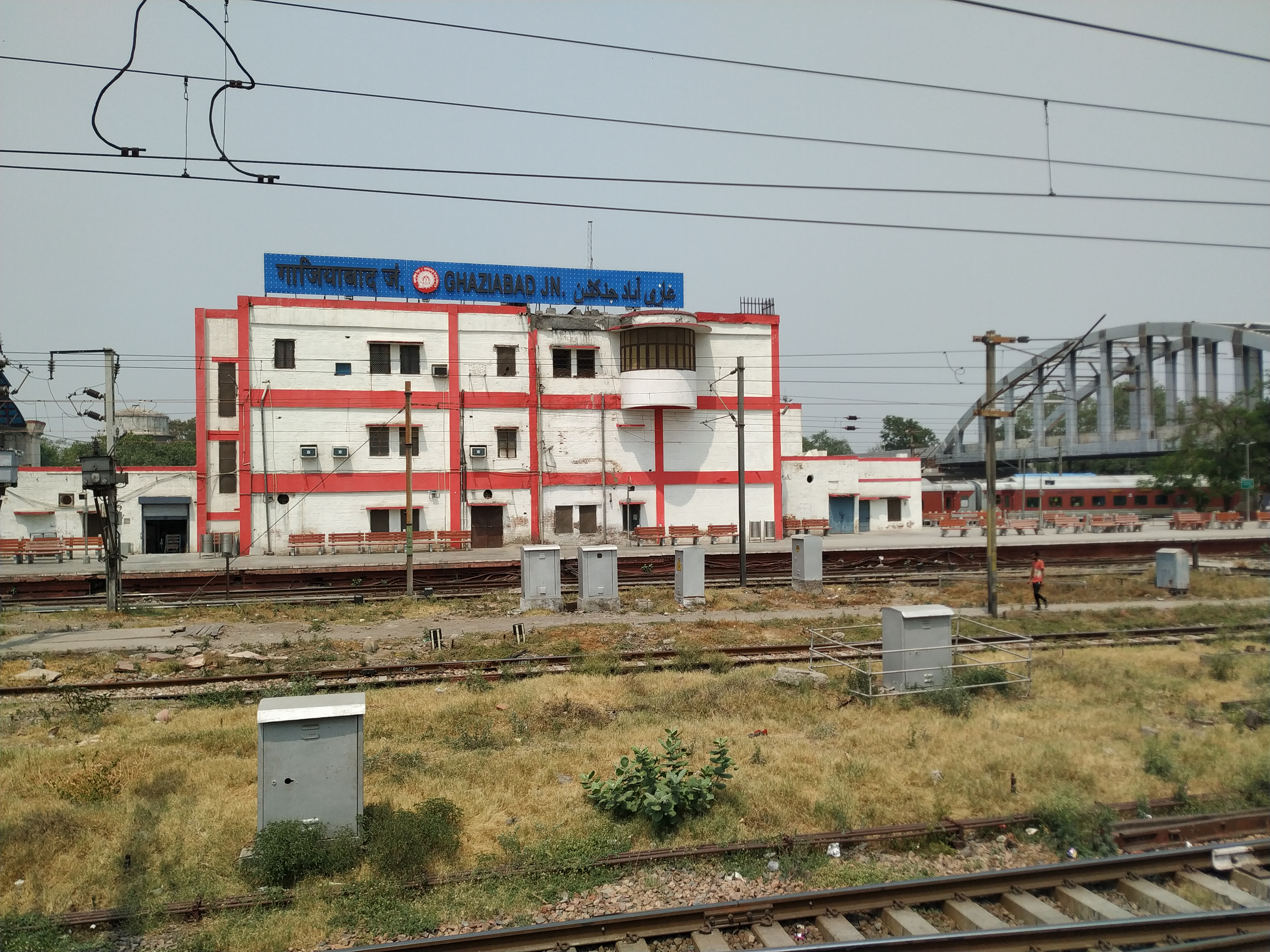

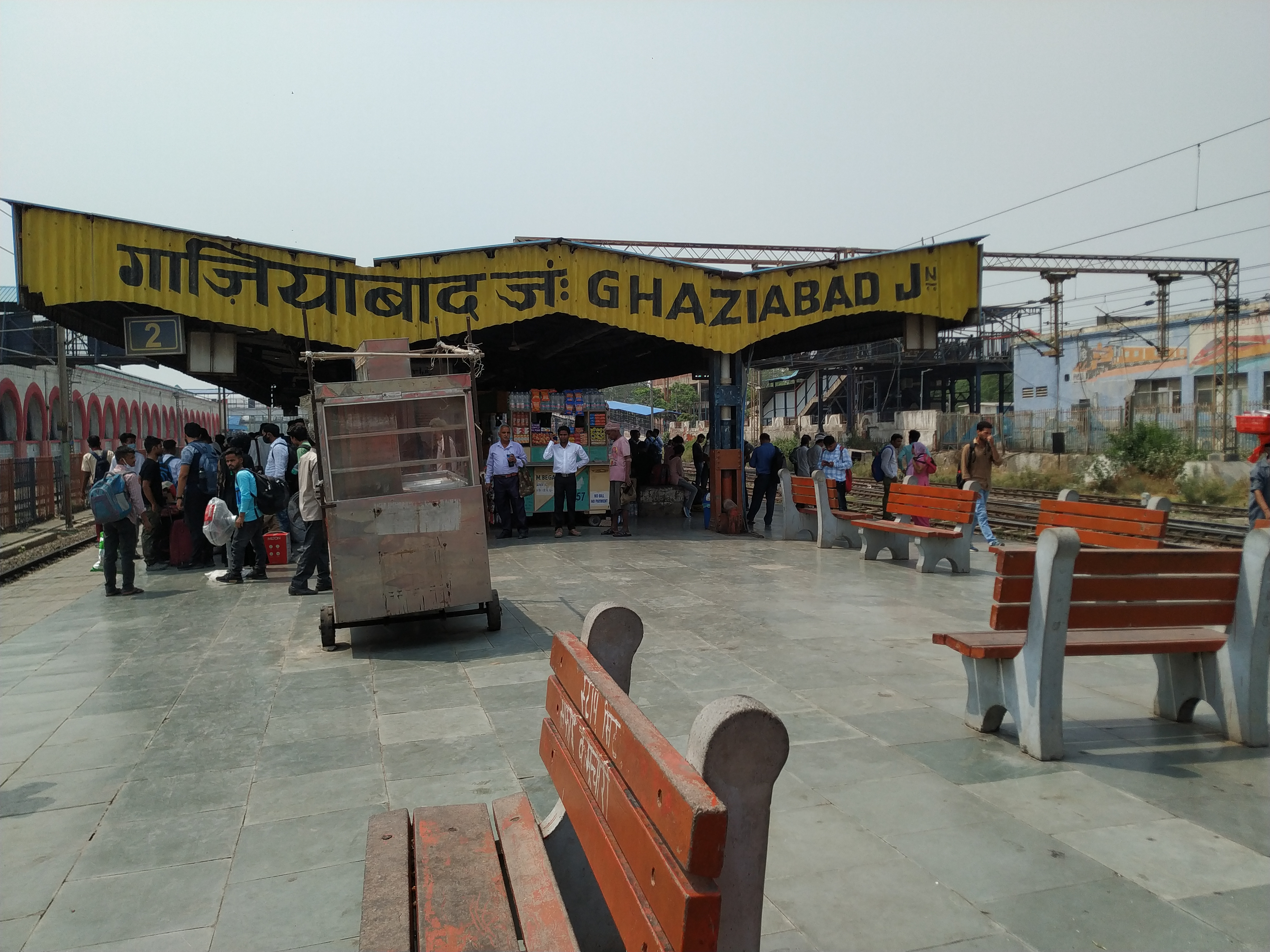

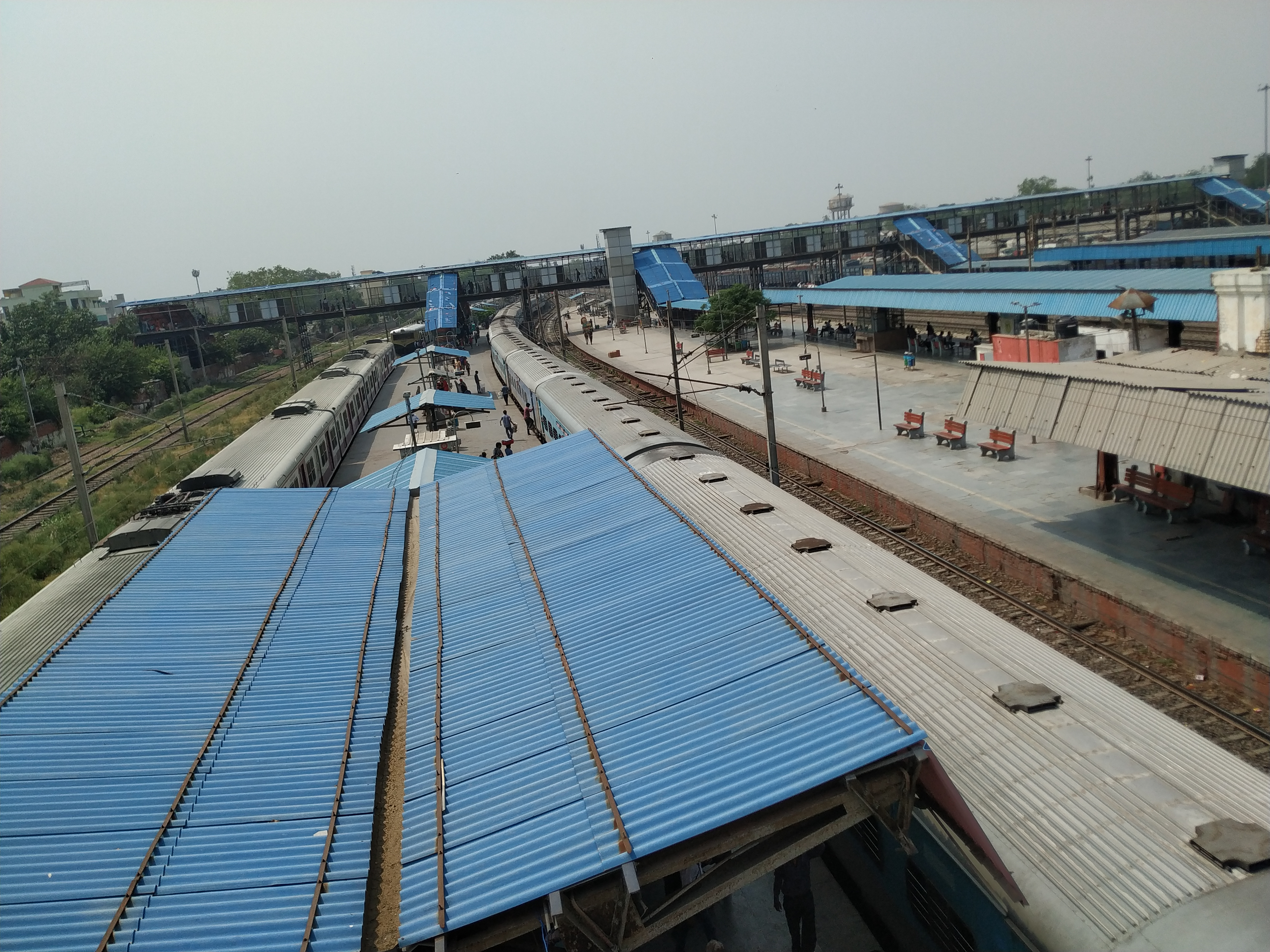

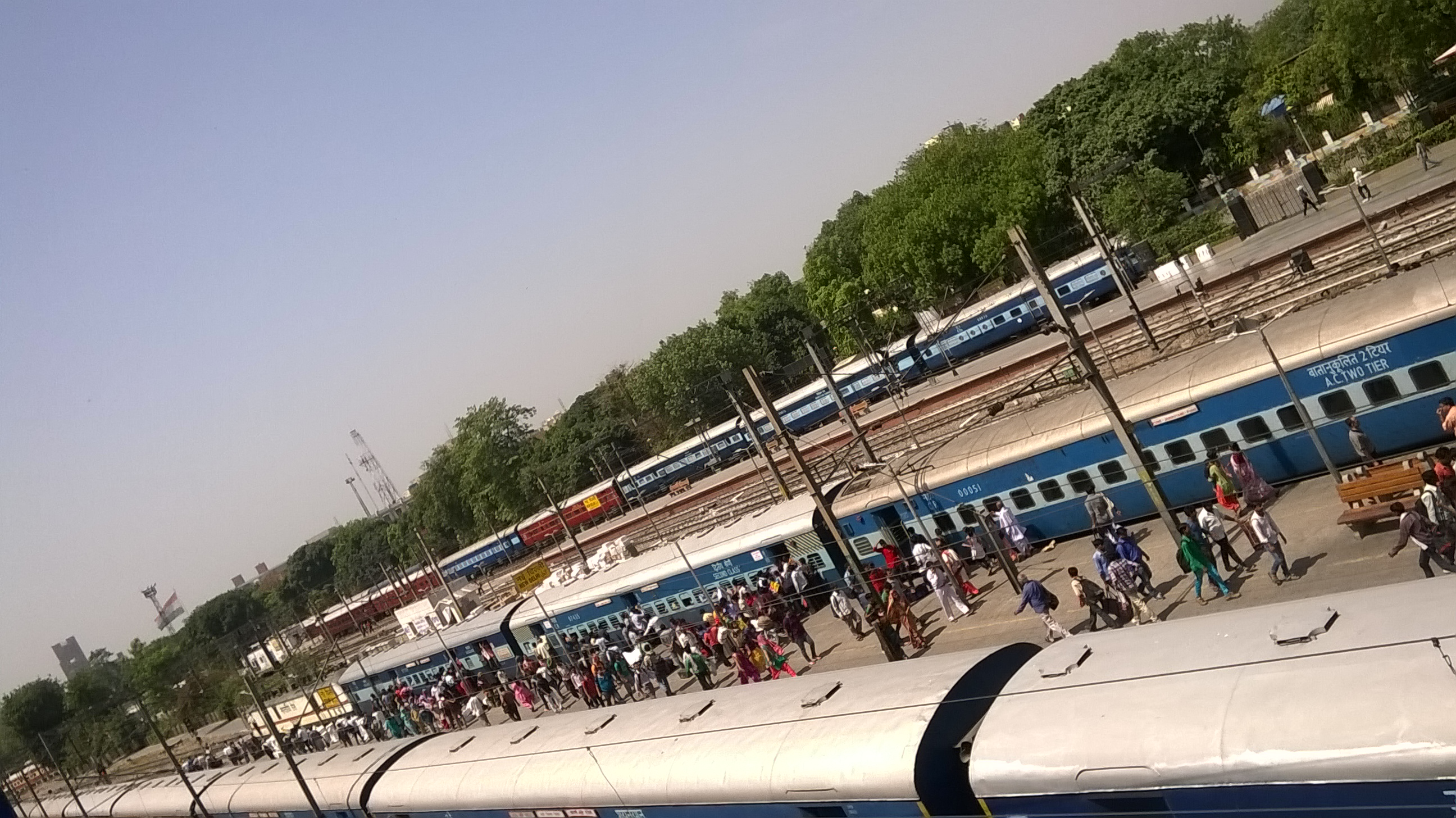

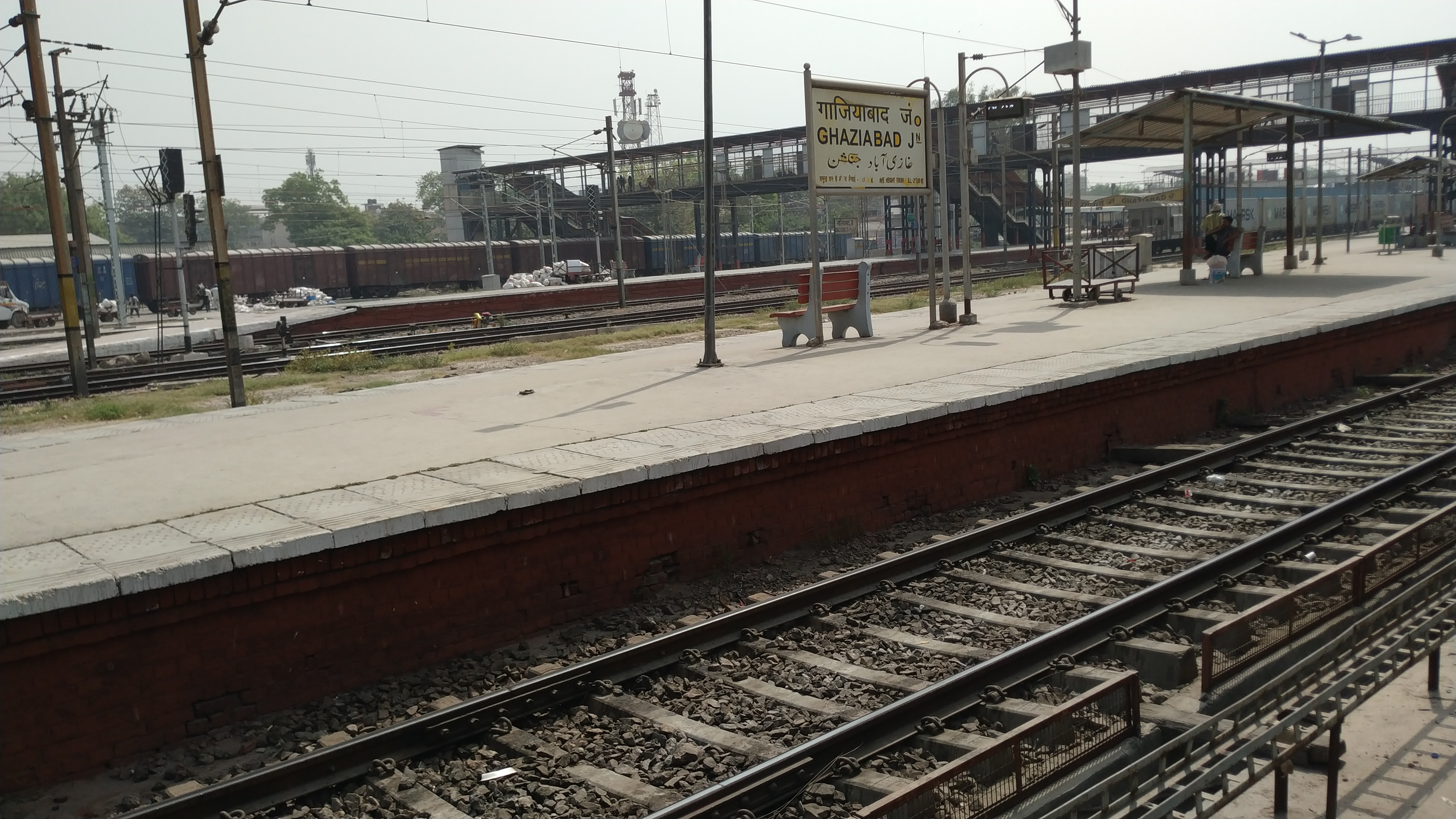

== See also ==
- Transport in Delhi
