= GZN =

GZN or gzn may refer to:

- GZN, the Indian Railways station code for New Ghaziabad railway station, Uttar Pradesh, India
- gzn, the ISO 639-3 code for Gane language, Indonesia
