= Hapur Junction railway station =

Railway Station in Uttar Pradesh, India

Hapur Junction
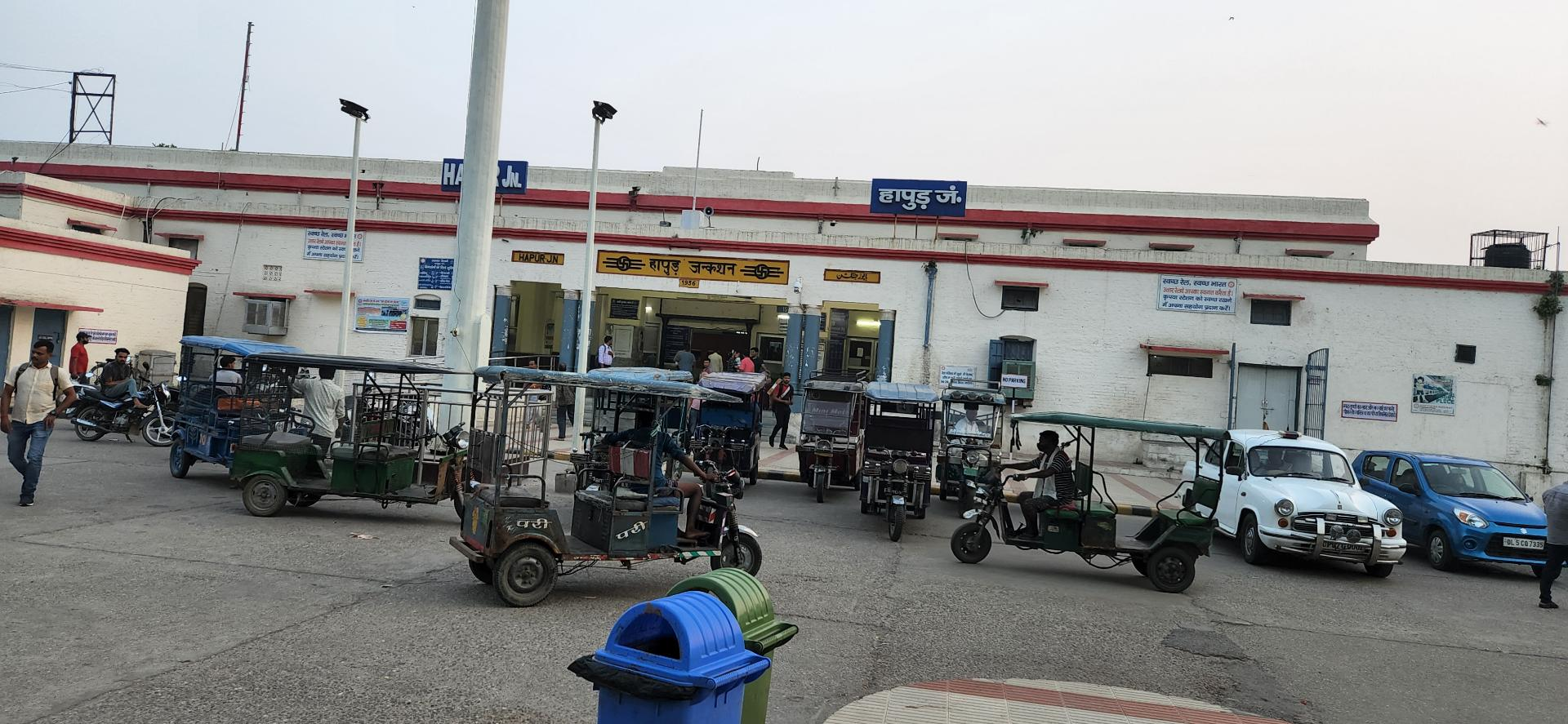
- Hapur Junction railway station

General information
- Location: Hapur district, Uttar Pradesh; India
- Coordinates: 28.7391°N 77.7787°E
- Elevation: 213.810 metres (701.48 ft)
- System: Indian Railway and Delhi Suburban Railway station
- Owner: Indian Railways
- Lines: Delhi–Moradabad line Meerut–Khurja line
- Platforms: 8
- Tracks: 8
- Connections: Auto stand plain stand

Construction
- Structure type: At grade
- Platform levels: yes
- Parking: yes

Other information
- Status: Functioning
- Station code: HPU
- Zone(s): Northern Railway
- Division(s): Moradabad
- Fare zone: Northern Railway
Location
- Location within Uttar Pradesh Location within India

Hapur Junction railway station is the main railway station serving Hapur city in the Hapur district, Uttar Pradesh. Its code is HPU. The station consists of five platforms. Hapur is a major railway junction of northern India. Two lines – Delhi–Moradabad and Meerut–Bulandshahr–Khurja – pass through the city.

Trains for New Delhi are usually available, thus making it easy for service people to travel. Trains are available for cities such as Lucknow, Guwahati, Ahmedabad, Ludhiana, Amritsar, Jalandhar, Varanasi, Dehradun, Gorakhpur, Jammu, etc.

== Routes ==
The following proposed NCR's Regional Orbital Rail Corridor (RORC) will pass through here:

- Panipat–Rohtak line, via Panipat–Gohana–Rohtak, existing.
- Rewari–Rohtak line, via Rohtak–Jhajjar–Rewari, existing.
- Rewari–Khurja line, via Rewari–Palwal–Bhiwadi–Khurja, new rail line, survey completed.
- Khurja–Meerut line, via Khurja–Bulandshahr–Hapur–Meerut, existing.
- Meerut–Panipat line, new rail line, survey completed.

== Gallery ==
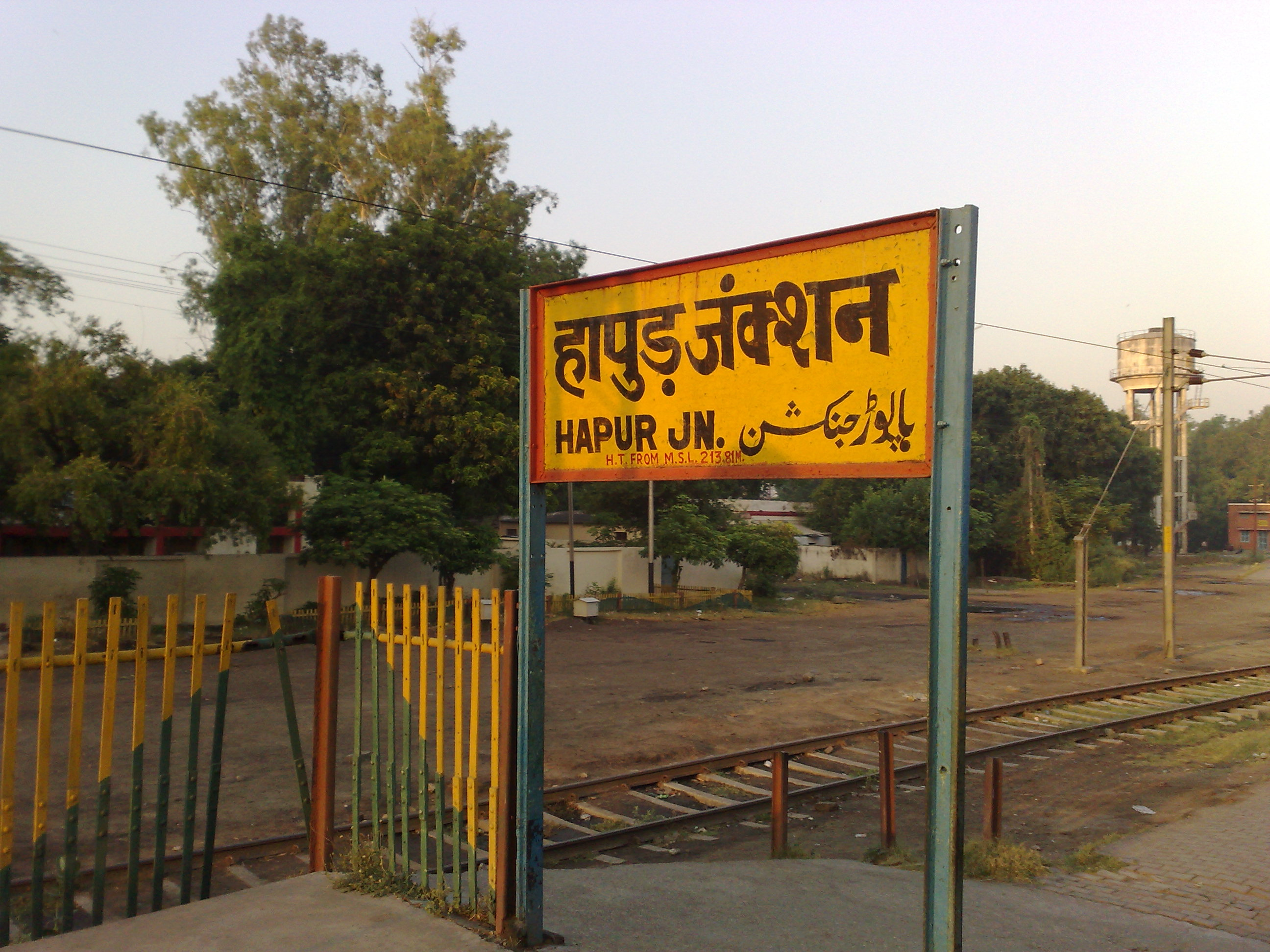
Hapur Junction railway station board

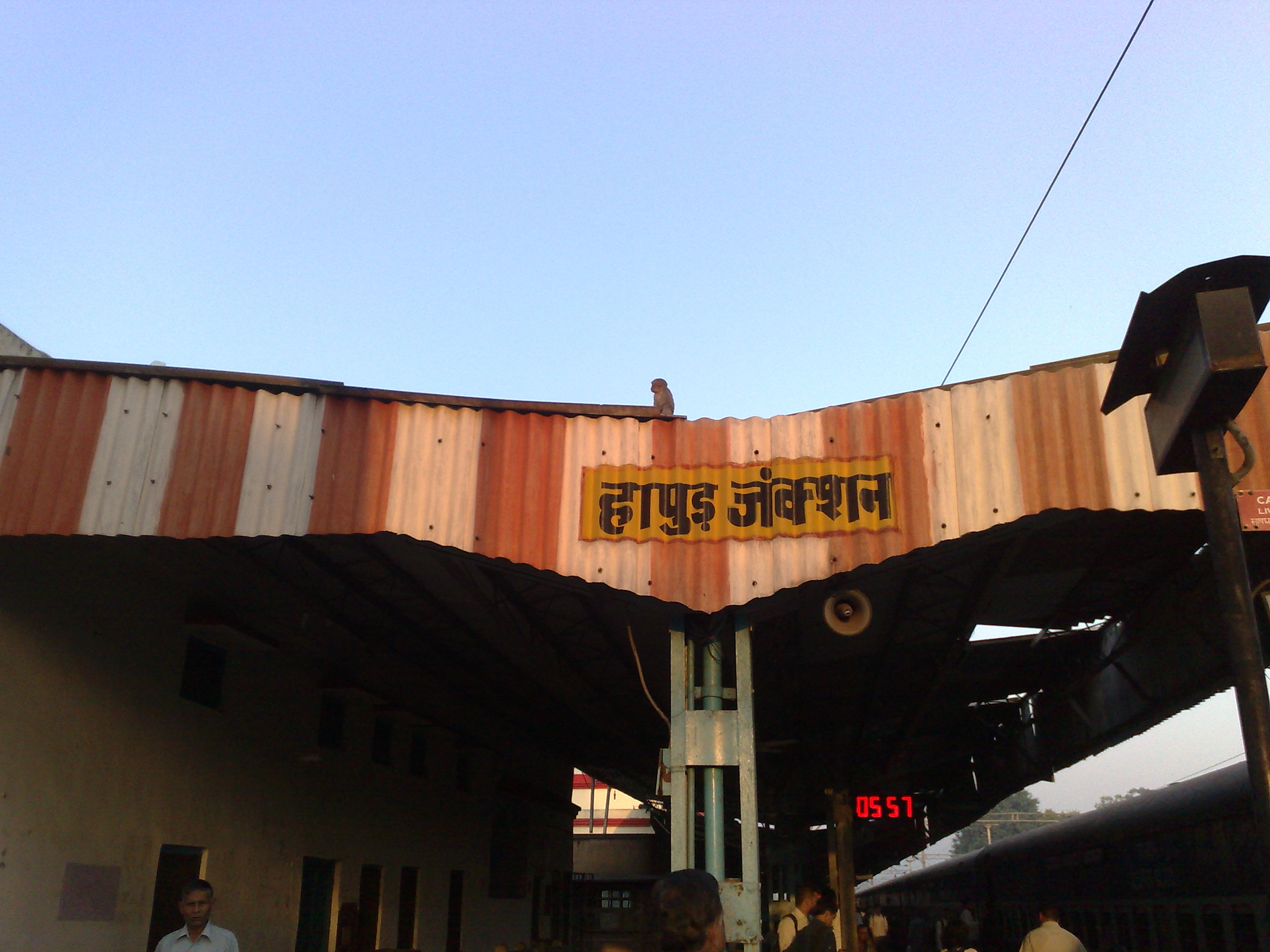
Hapur Junction railway station roof
