= Saharanpur Junction railway station =

Railway station in Uttar Pradesh, India

Saharanpur Junction
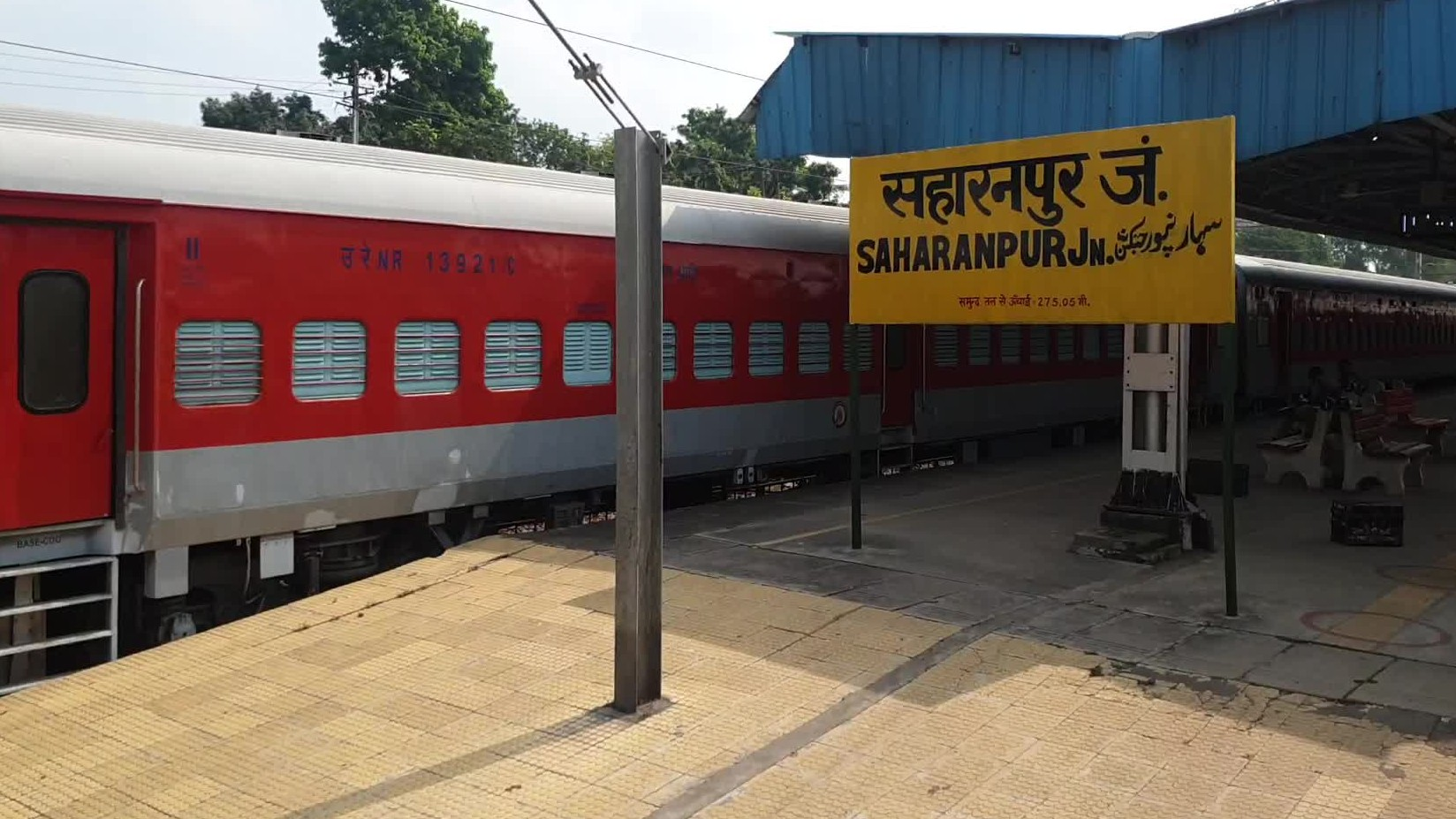
- Saharanpur Junction railway station.

General information
- Location: New Patel Nagar, Bijopuri, Saharanpur, Uttar Pradesh; India
- Coordinates: 29.9613°N 77.5411°E
- Elevation: 275.050 metres (902.40 ft)
- System: Regional rail and Light rail station
- Owner: Ministry of Railways (India)
- Operator: Indian Railways
- Lines: Moradabad–Ambala line, Delhi-Meerut-Saharanpur line, Delhi-Shamli-Saharanpur line
- Platforms: 6
- Tracks: 10
- Connections: Auto stand

Construction
- Structure type: At grade
- Parking: Yes

Other information
- Status: Active
- Station code: SRE
- Zone(s): Northern Railway
- Division(s): Ambala

History
- Opened: 1868

Passengers
- 50,000

Services
Location
- Location within Uttar Pradesh Location within India

Saharanpur Junction (station code SRE) is a railway station in Saharanpur, Uttar Pradesh, India.

The station is part of the Northern Railway zone's Ambala Division and the Moradabad–Ambala line via Saharanpur.

It is also part of the Delhi-Meerut-Saharanpur line and Delhi-Shamli-Saharanpur line.

This station is an A category (NSG 3) in Northern Railway. This station is situated in centre of Saharanpur.

== Overview ==
Saharanpur Junction is a high-revenue station, serving over 50,000 passengers and over 95 mail/express and 35 passenger trains on a daily basis. It is under the administrative control of the Northern Railway zone's Ambala railway division.

Saharanpur Junction is well connected with many important cultural cities such as Delhi, Mumbai, Kolkata, Jammu, Chandigarh, Dehradun, Jaipur, Ahmedabad, Bhopal, Lucknow, Patna, Haridwar, Indore, Agra, Varanasi, Amritsar, Meerut, and Prayagraj.

== History ==
The first railway line, operated by the North-Western Railway, entered the Saharanpur district in 1869. The station itself was officially opened to the public around November 14, 1868, as part of the broader Delhi-Ambala-Amritsar railway line.

The station quickly developed into an important junction. In 1886, the Oudh and Rohilkhand Railway main line was extended through Roorkee to Saharanpur, making it a major terminus. The main building of the railway station has remained since 1907. During its peak, the station was known as one of the most important railway junctions in the subcontinent, operating 24 hours a day due to the convergence of the Moradabad, Delhi, and Ambala rail sections. It also featured workshops for the maintenance of steam engines.

== Modernization ==
As of January 2025, Saharanpur Junction is currently undergoing a major redevelopment as part of the Indian Railways' flagship Amrit Bharat Station Scheme, with a project cost of around ₹15 crores (₹150,000,000).

The existing track between Delhi and Saharanpur is being upgraded to enable an increase in train speeds from 110 kmph to 130 kmph. All 14 level crossings between Saharanpur and Delhi are also being replaced by Road Over Bridges (ROBs) or Road Under Bridges (RUBs) for improved road traffic flow.

== Gallery ==
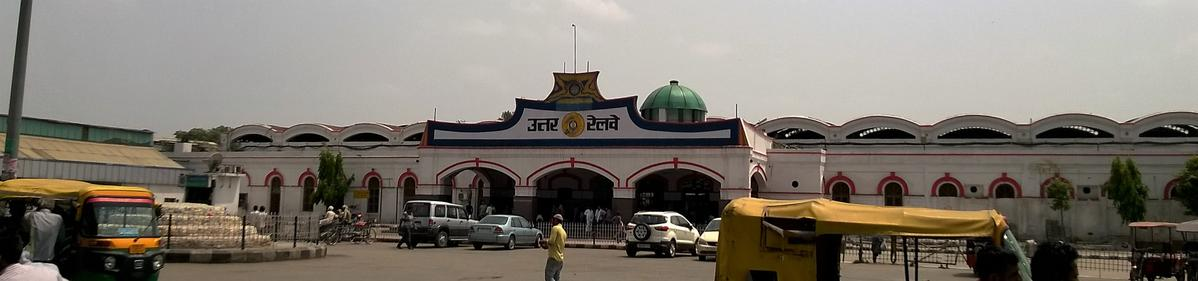
Saharanpur Junction

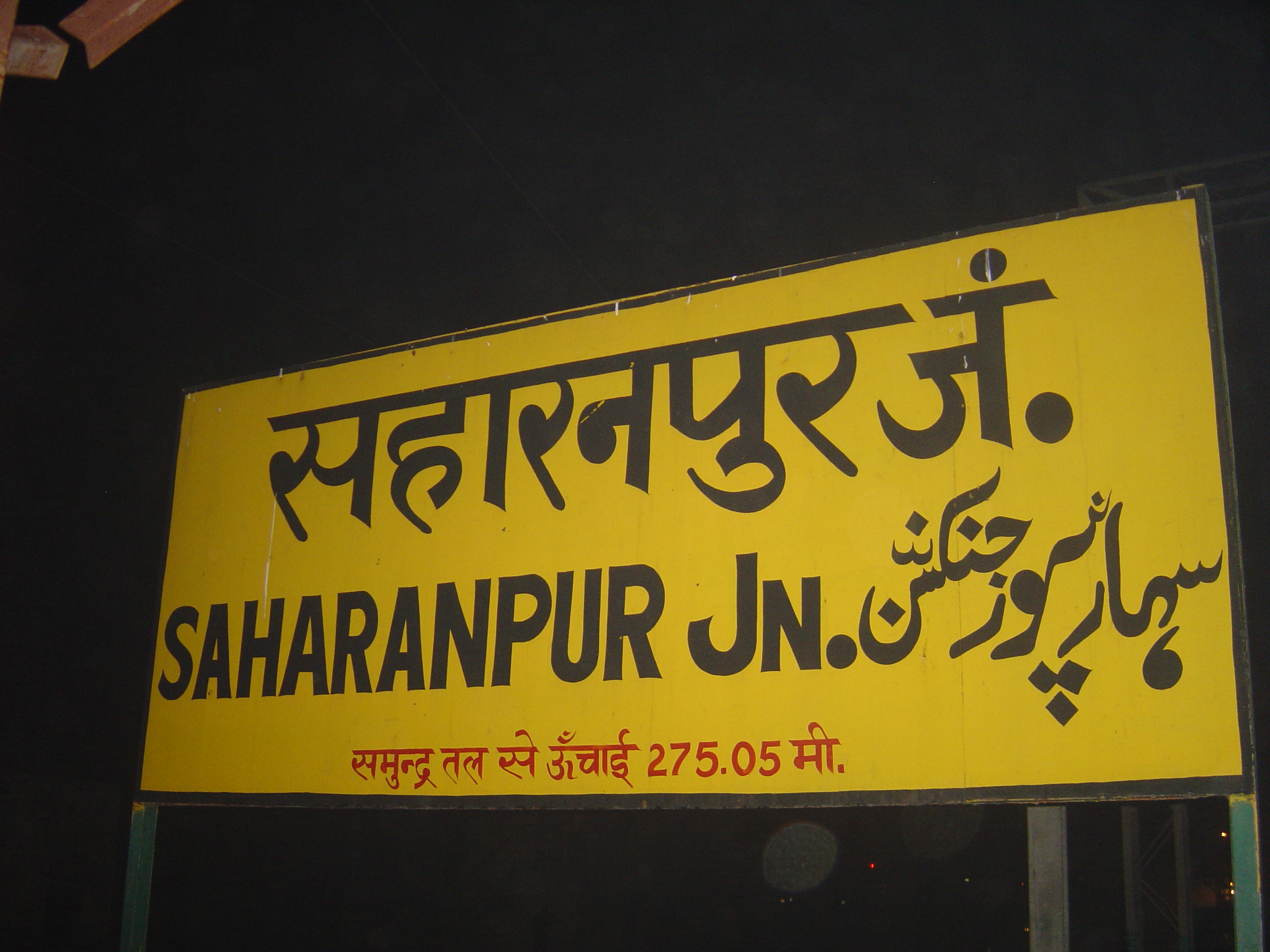
Saharanpur Junction Board

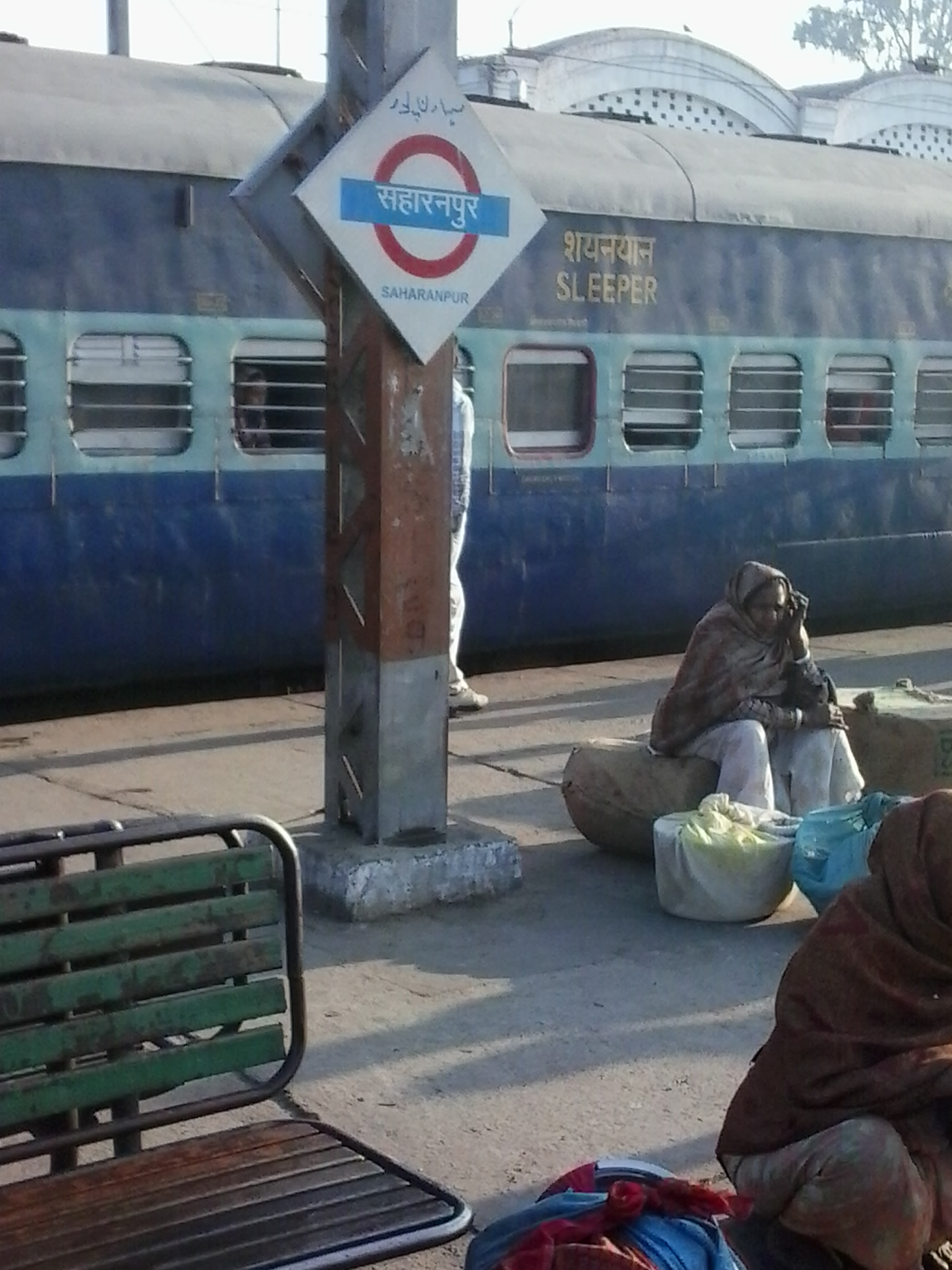
Saharanpur railway platform

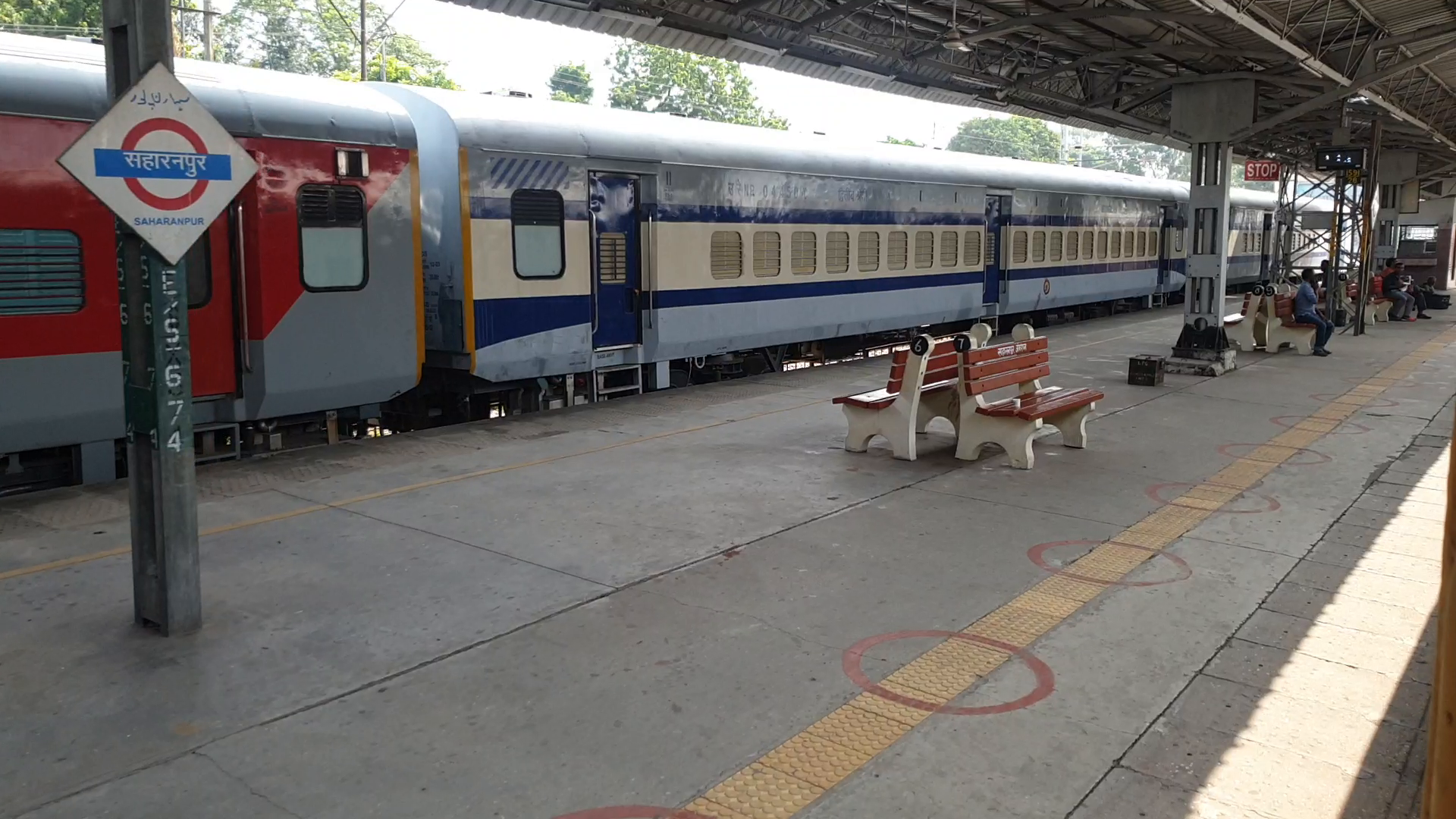
Saharanpur Junction platform 4.

== Electric Loco Shed, Khanalampura ==
Electric Loco Shed Khanalampura (ELS KJGY) is situated in Saharanpur, Uttar Pradesh, India. It is among the newest electric loco sheds of Indian Railways. The shed was Commissioned in 2015.

Serial No.	Locomotive Class	Horsepower	Quantity
1.	WAG-7	5350	9
2.	WAG-9	6120	137
Total Locomotives Active as of February 2026			146

== Alstom Depot, Saharanpur ==
Aside from the regular electric loco shed, Alstom has set up a depot for its WAG-12 locomotives. As per the contract, this depot will hold 250 of such locomotives.

Electric Loco Shed, Saharanpur
Serial No.	Locomotive Class	Horsepower	Holding
1.	WAG-12/12B	12000	250
Total Locomotives Active as of February 2026			250

== See also ==
- Lucknow Junction railway station
- Moradabad Junction railway station
- Meerut City railway station
- Roorkee railway station
- Dehradun-Anand Vihar Terminal Vande Bharat Express
