= New Ghaziabad railway station =

Railway Station in Uttar Pradesh, India

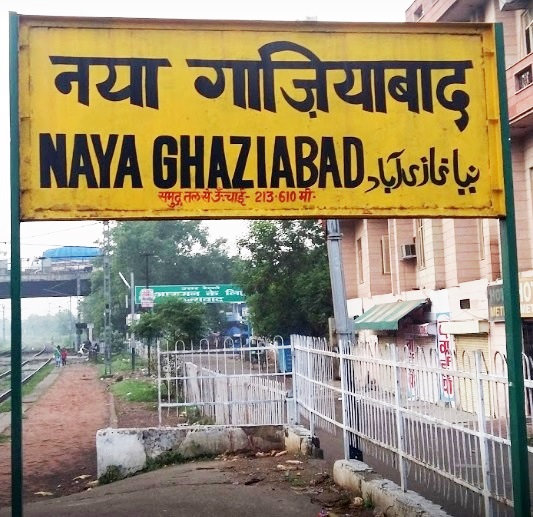
- Naya Ghaziabad station board

General information
- Location: Maharana Pratap Marg, Lohia Nagar, Ghaziabad, Uttar Pradesh; India
- Coordinates: 28.6744°N 77.4380°E
- Elevation: 216 metres (709 ft)
- System: Indian Railways station
- Owner: Indian Railways
- Operator: Northern Railway
- Line: Delhi–Meerut–Saharanpur line
- Platforms: 2
- Tracks: 4 (construction – doubling of diesel BG)
- Connections: Auto stand

Construction
- Structure type: Standard (on-ground station)
- Parking: No
- Cycle facilities: No

Other information
- Status: Functioning
- Station code: GZN
- Zone(s): Northern Railway
- Division(s): Delhi
Location
- Location within India Location within Uttar Pradesh

New Ghaziabad railway station is a small railway station in Ghaziabad district, Uttar Pradesh. Its code is GZN. It serves Ghaziabad city. The station consists of two platforms. The platforms are not well sheltered. It lacks many facilities including water and sanitation. Electrification of the Ghaziabad–Meerut City railway station section was completed in 2012.

== Trains ==
The following trains run from New Ghaziabad railway station:

- Ambala–Delhi Passenger (unreserved)
- Anand Vihar–Meerut City MEMU
- Bandra Terminus–Dehradun Express
- Delhi–Saharanpur Passenger (unreserved)
- Kalka–Delhi Passenger (unreserved)
- Mandasor–Meerut City Link Express
- Meerut Cantt.–Rewari Passenger (unreserved)
- Nizamuddin–Ambala Passenger (unreserved)
- Old Delhi–Rishikesh Passenger (unreserved)
- Old Delhi–Saharanpur DEMU Passenger
- Rewari–Meerut Cantt. Passenger (unreserved)
- Shalimar Express
- Yoga Express

== Gallery ==
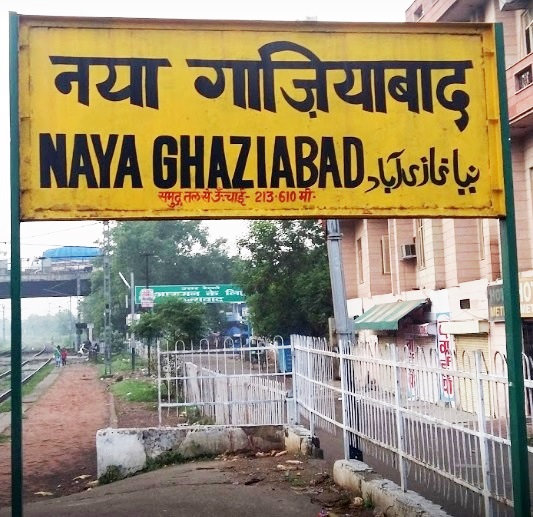
