= Meerut City Junction railway station =

Railway Station in Uttar Pradesh, India

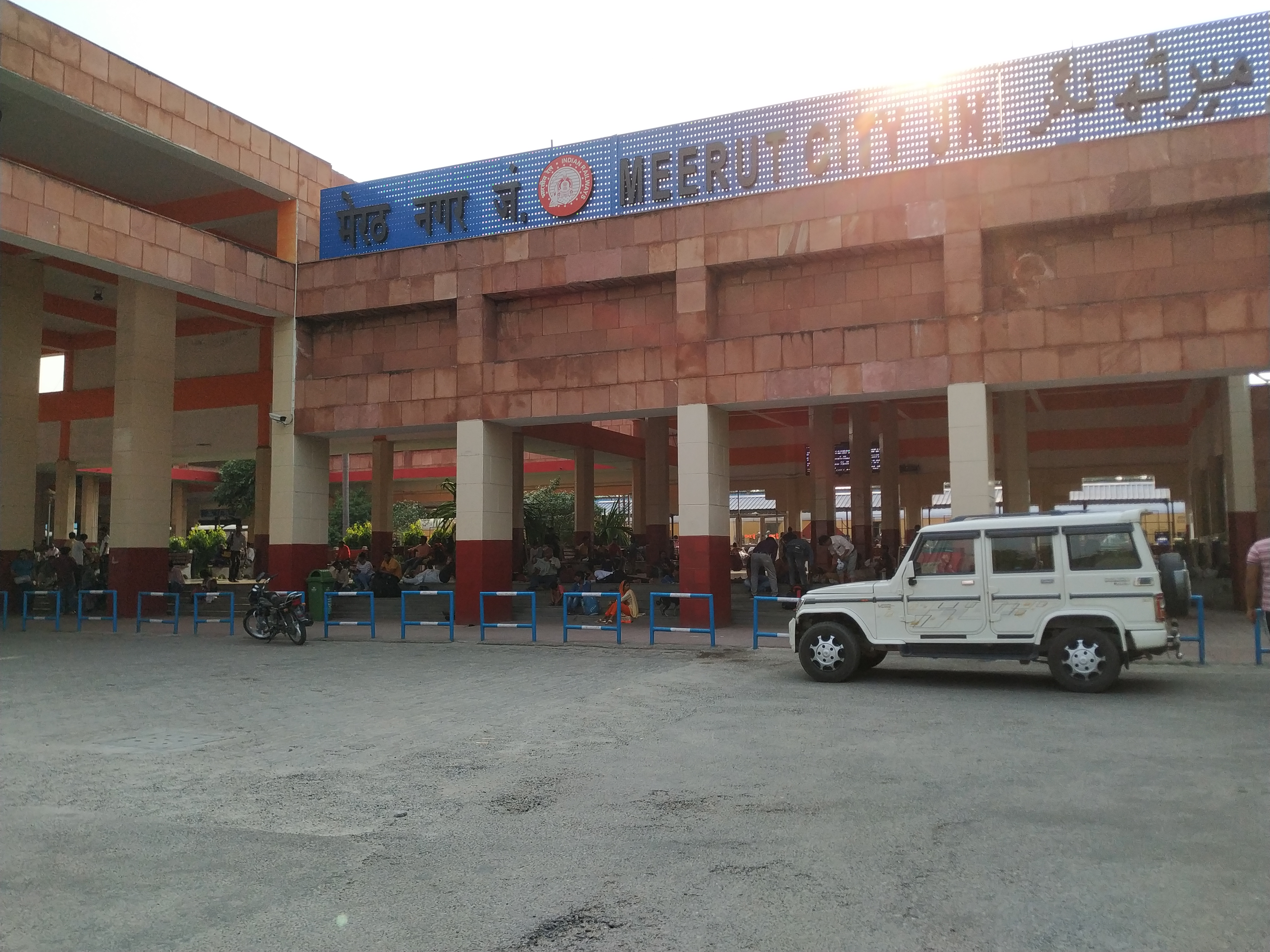
- Meerut City Junction

General information
- Location: City railway station road, Meerut, Uttar Pradesh; India
- Coordinates: 28°58′43″N 77°40′32″E
- Elevation: 224.340 metres (736.02 ft)
- System: Indian Railways junction station
- Owner: Ministry of Railways (India)
- Operator: Indian Railways
- Lines: Delhi–Meerut–Saharanpur line Meerut–Bulandshahar–Khurja line
- Platforms: 6 (1A, 1, 2, 3, 4 and 5)
- Tracks: 13
- Bus stands: City Bus (Local) Public Transit

Construction
- Structure type: At grade
- Parking: Available
- Accessible: Yes

Other information
- Status: Functioning
- Station code: MTC
- Zone(s): Northern Railway
- Division(s): Delhi

Services
Preceding station	Indian Railways	Following station
Partapur towards ?	Delhi–Meerut–Saharanpur line	Meerut Cantt towards ?
Nurnagar Halt towards Khurja	Meerut–Bulandshahr–Khurja line	Terminus
Location
- Location within Uttar Pradesh

Meerut City Junction railway station, is the main railway station in the city of Meerut. It is a junction of Meerut–Bulandshahr–Khurja line and Delhi–Meerut–Saharanpur line.

It lies on the Northern Railway zone of India under Delhi division.

== History ==
This station was established by British India government in 1911. It lies on the Delhi to Haridwar/Dehradun line.

Meerut–Saharanpur section was doubled in 2018. Delhi to Sharanpur is a double electrified line.

== Lines and routes ==
- Existing: It is a junction of the following: Doubling of Meerut–Saharanpur section is Completed.
  - Delhi–Meerut–Saharanpur line
  - Saharanpur-Meerut–Bulandshahr–Khurja line, via Hapur Jn, connect to Kolkata–Delhi line.
- Approved/under-construction:
  - Meerut-Panipat line: 104 km long ₹3,500 crore, After the completed DPR was approved in 2022, the final approval from NITI Aayog and Cabinet was granted for the fund release, land acquisition commenced from Diwana (Panipat) to Daurala (Meerut) after installing ~100 large and ~300 small GPS-based pillars along the alignment. In the 2024–25 Railway Budget, a nominal allocation of ₹10 lakh was made under the expenditure head and till date approximately ₹75.92 lakh had already been expended from the earlier sanctioned budgets. However, actual construction work had not commenced.
  - Meerut-Bijnor line: A 63 km (39 mi) rail link from Meerut's Daurala station to Bijnor via Daurala, Mawana, Hastinapur, Bahsuma and Daranagar. Survey was completed in 2016.

== Trains ==
A total of 78 trains halt at Meerut City Jn railway station. 8 trains originate from and terminate at Meerut City. Sangam Express, Nauchandi Express, Rajya Rani Express, Vande Bharat Meerut-Lucknow-Varanasi are originating trains that go to Allahabad via Bulandshahr–Aligarh–Kanpur and Allahabad via Bareilly–Lucknow, and Bareilly–Lucknow respectively. Three Khruja–Meerut Passenger trains shuttle between Meerut and Khurja and 1 train Umbala Passenger and Rewari Passenger also originate from Meerut City. About 60 trains run up and down to Delhi, Mumbai, Madurai, Kochuvelli, Dehradun, Amritsar, Jammu Tawi, Okha, Bilaspur, Puri, Indore, Ujjain daily, biweekly or weekly.

Dehradun–Anand Vihar Terminal Vande Bharat Express also stops at the Meerut City Junction.

After Meerut City, the second major railway station is Meerut Cantonment, located 4 km North.

== Infrastructure ==
The station is equipped with route relay interlocking technology for managing tracks and signalling. The rail yard has 2 washing lines for maintenance or train rakes. It has also got a coach care facility with capacity of 2 coaches.

Station also has a dedicated cargo siding for freight loading and unloading. The siding has 3 zones: open siding for coal, cement, fertilizer etc., a petroleum terminal bay of BPCL and, a closed siding terminal for all other type of goods. The siding is located about 1.9 km east of the station.

== Amenities ==
City railway station is a Class-A railway station of Northern Railway. It is equipped with most public amenities like restaurants, waiting room, retiring room, police station, post office etc. The station is fully disabled friendly. Escalators and elevators are being installed for easing passenger movement between platform 1 and 2–3. PNB and SBI ATMs are also available at station entrance.

Station premises also have a Railway Hospital for railway staff.

== Gallery ==
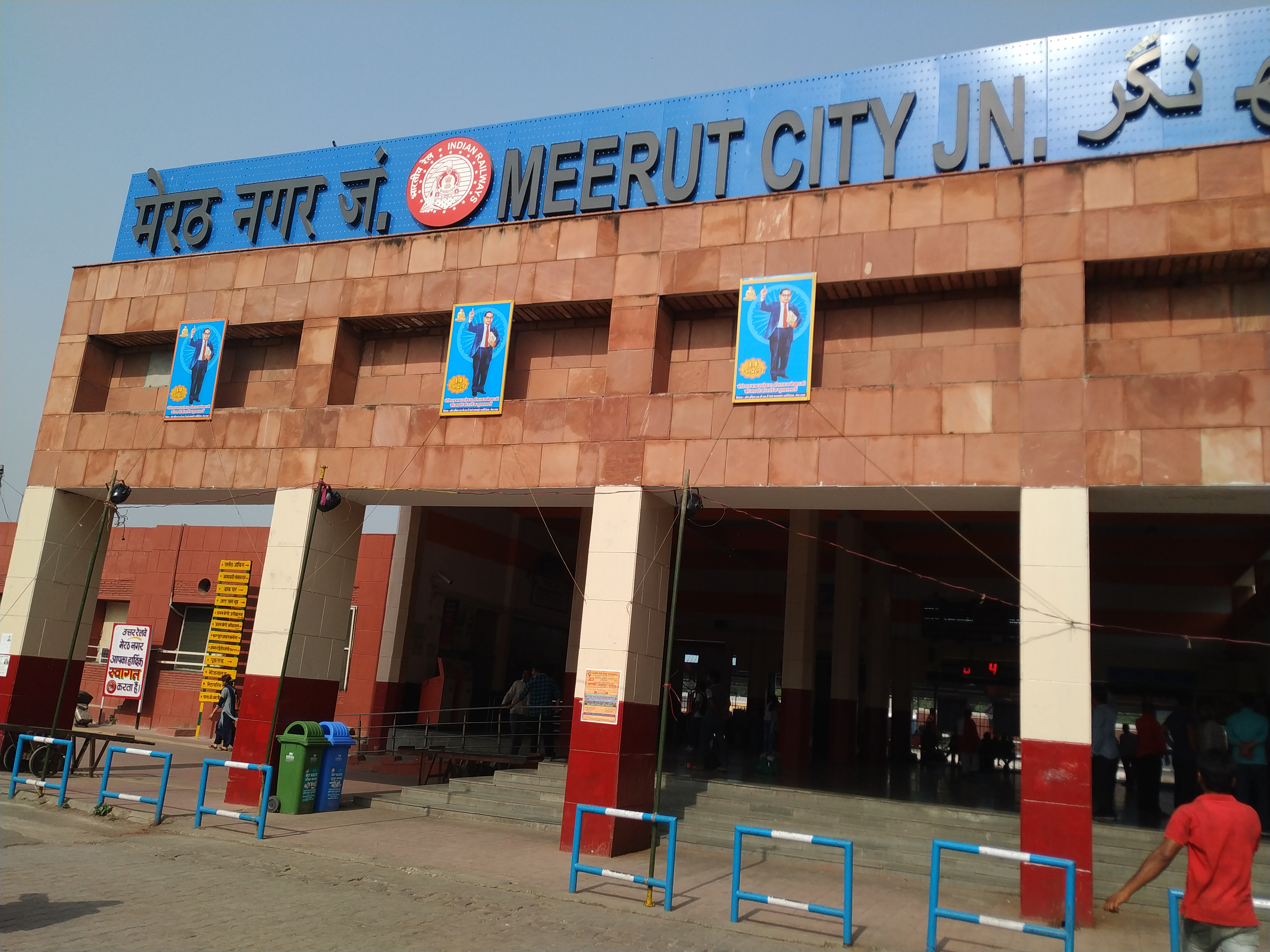
Meerut City Junction from outside.

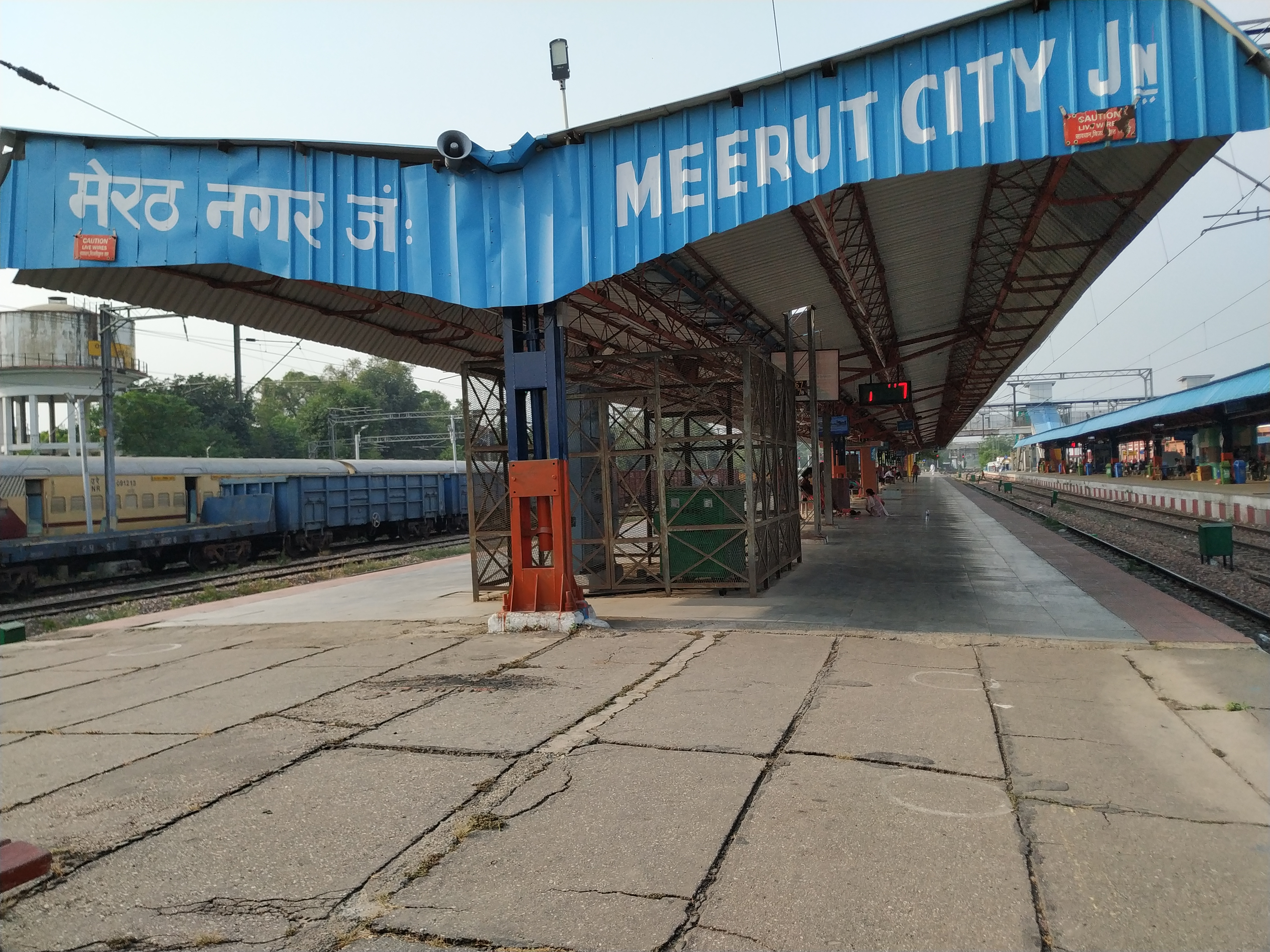
Meerut City Junction Platform 4,5

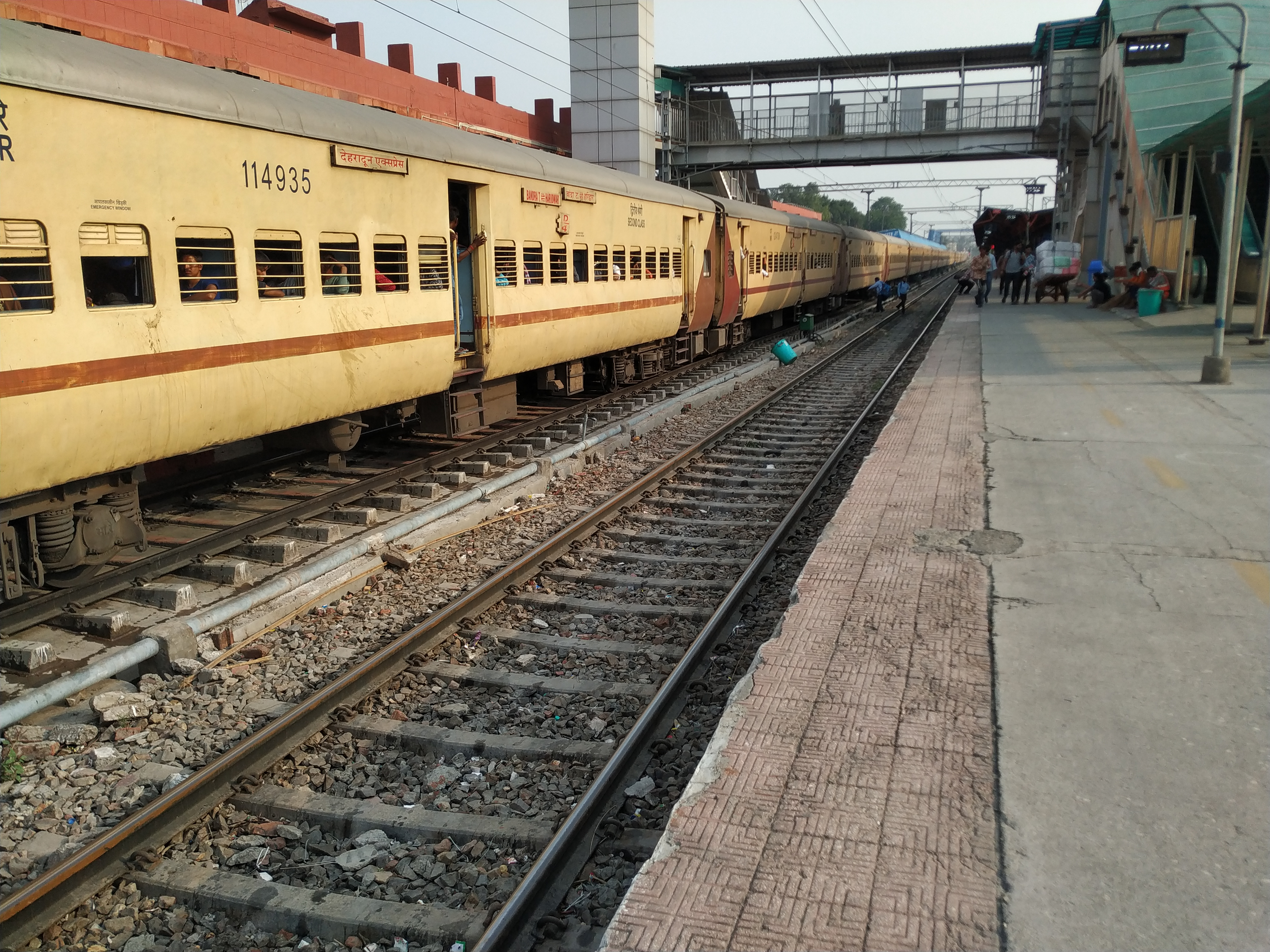
19020 Dehradun Express on Platform 1 of Meerut City

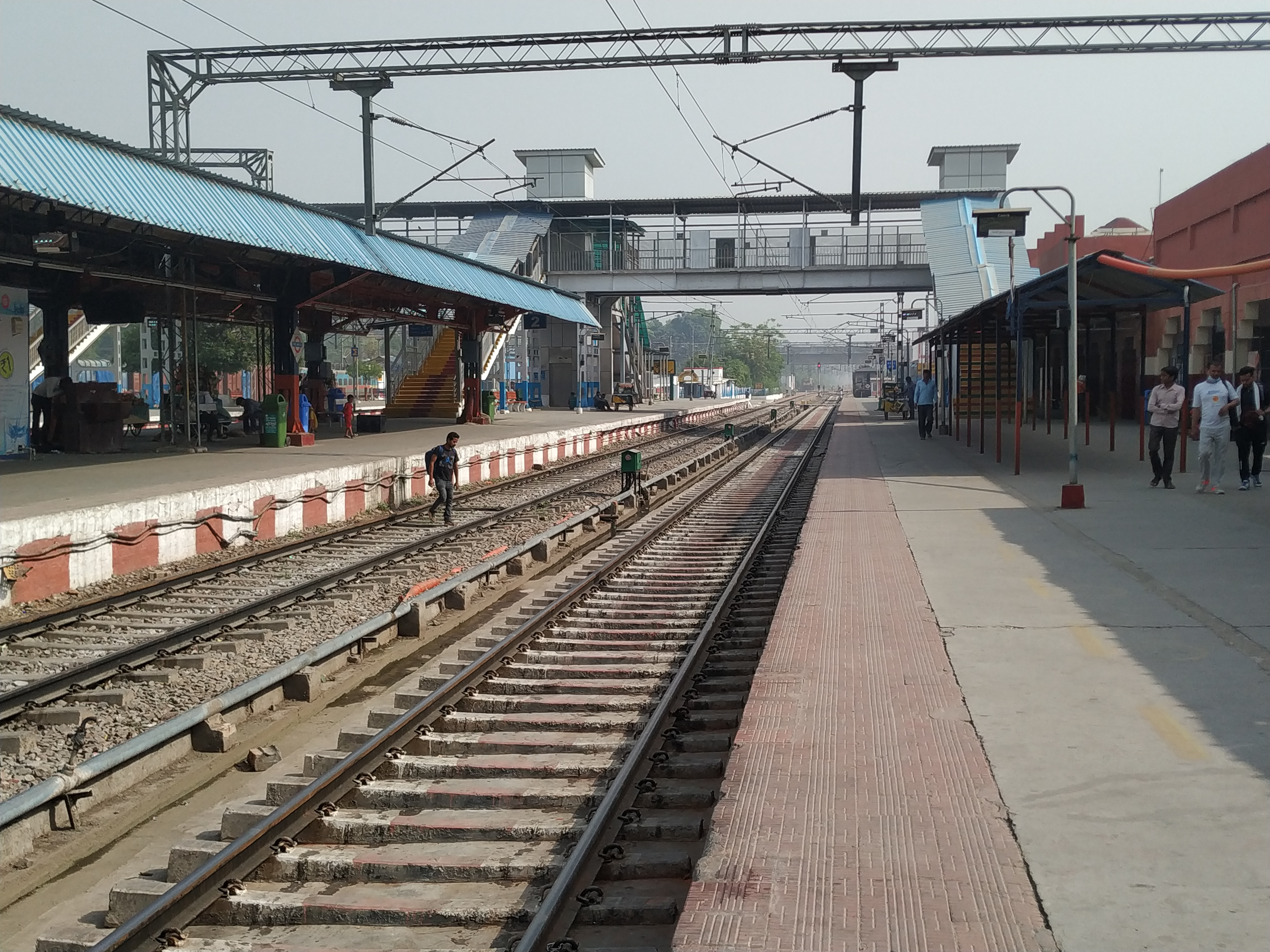
Meerut City Junction Railway Station Platform 1.

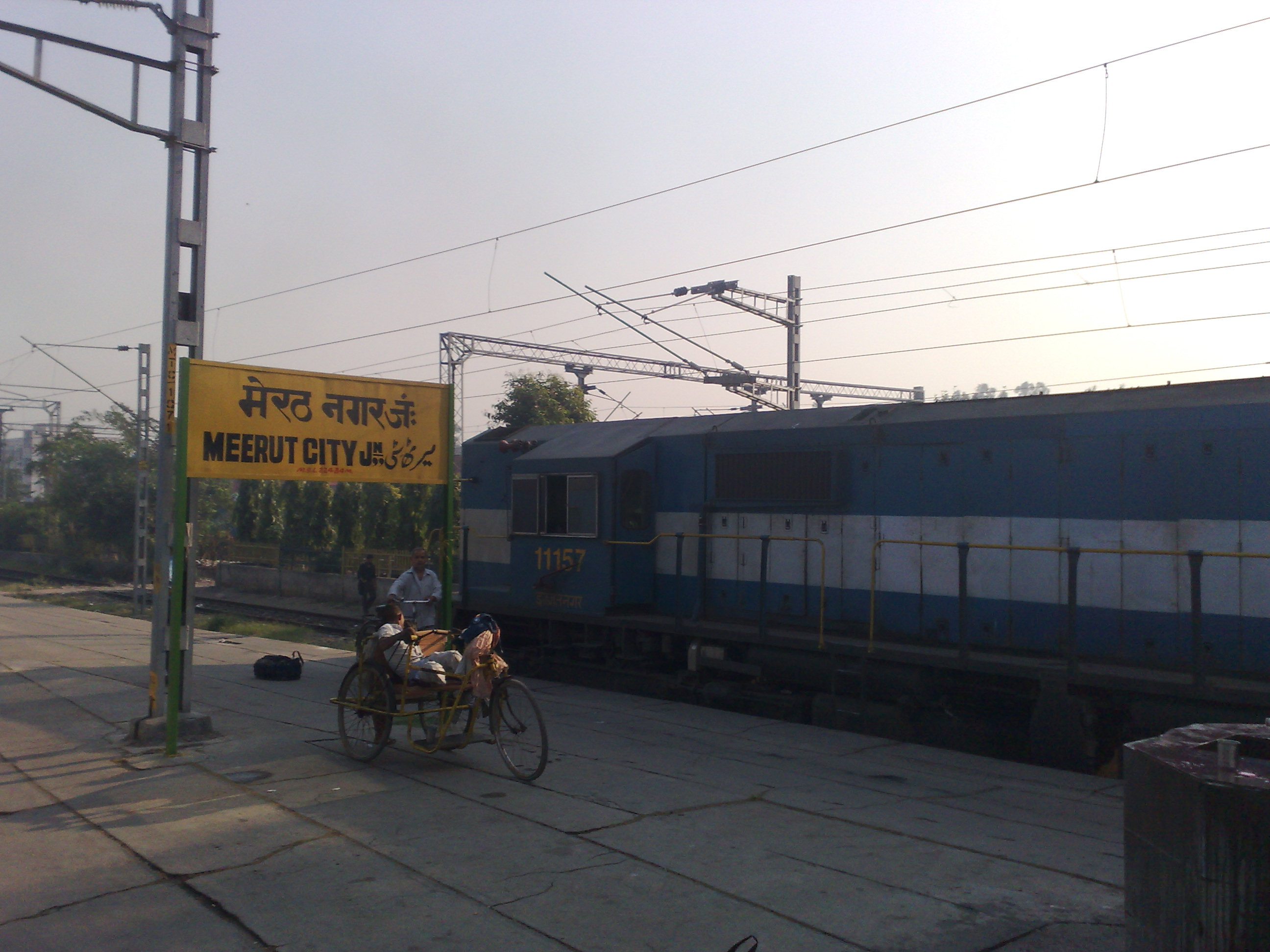
Meerut City Junction platform view

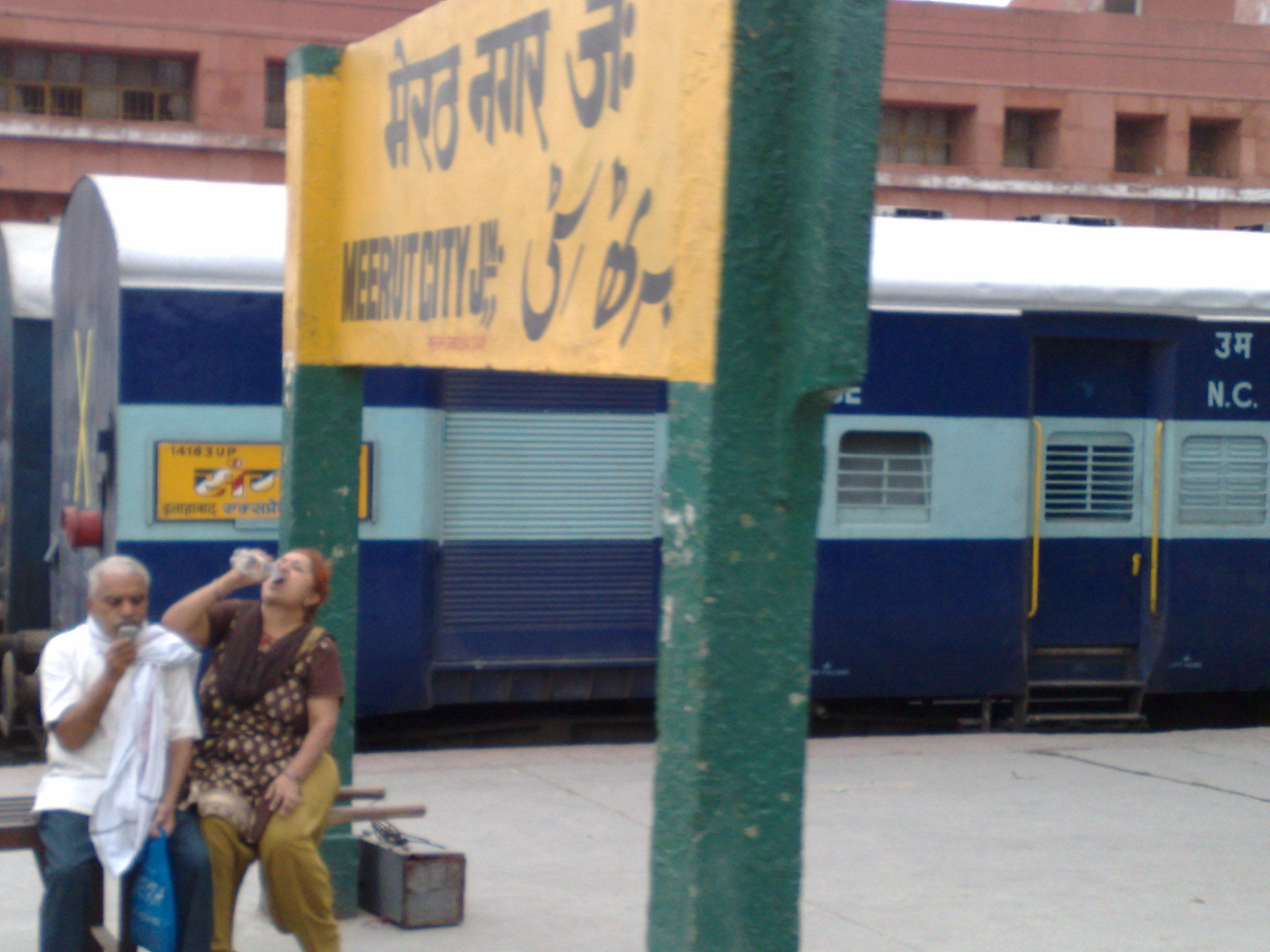
Sangam Express at Meerut City

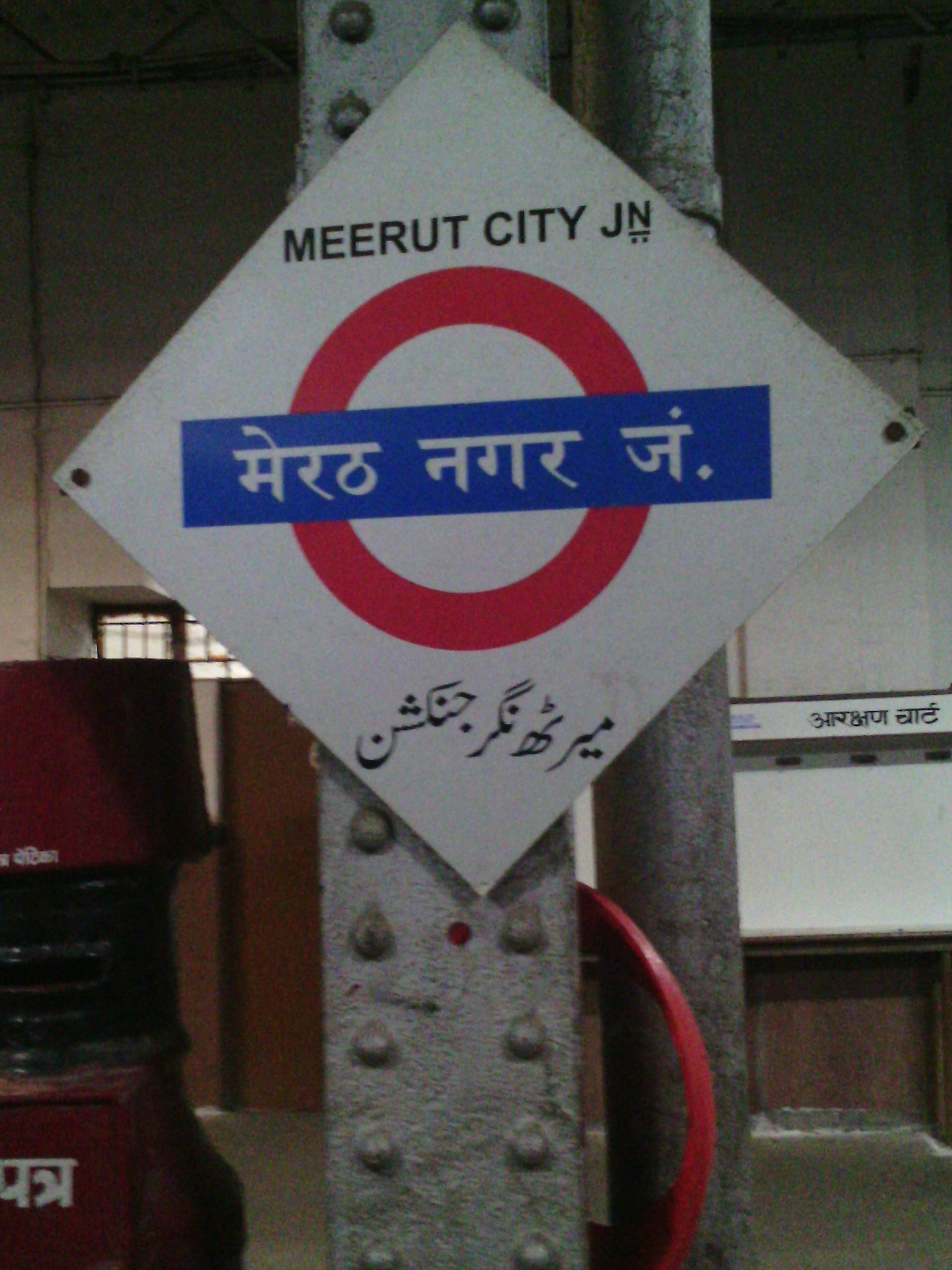
Station logo

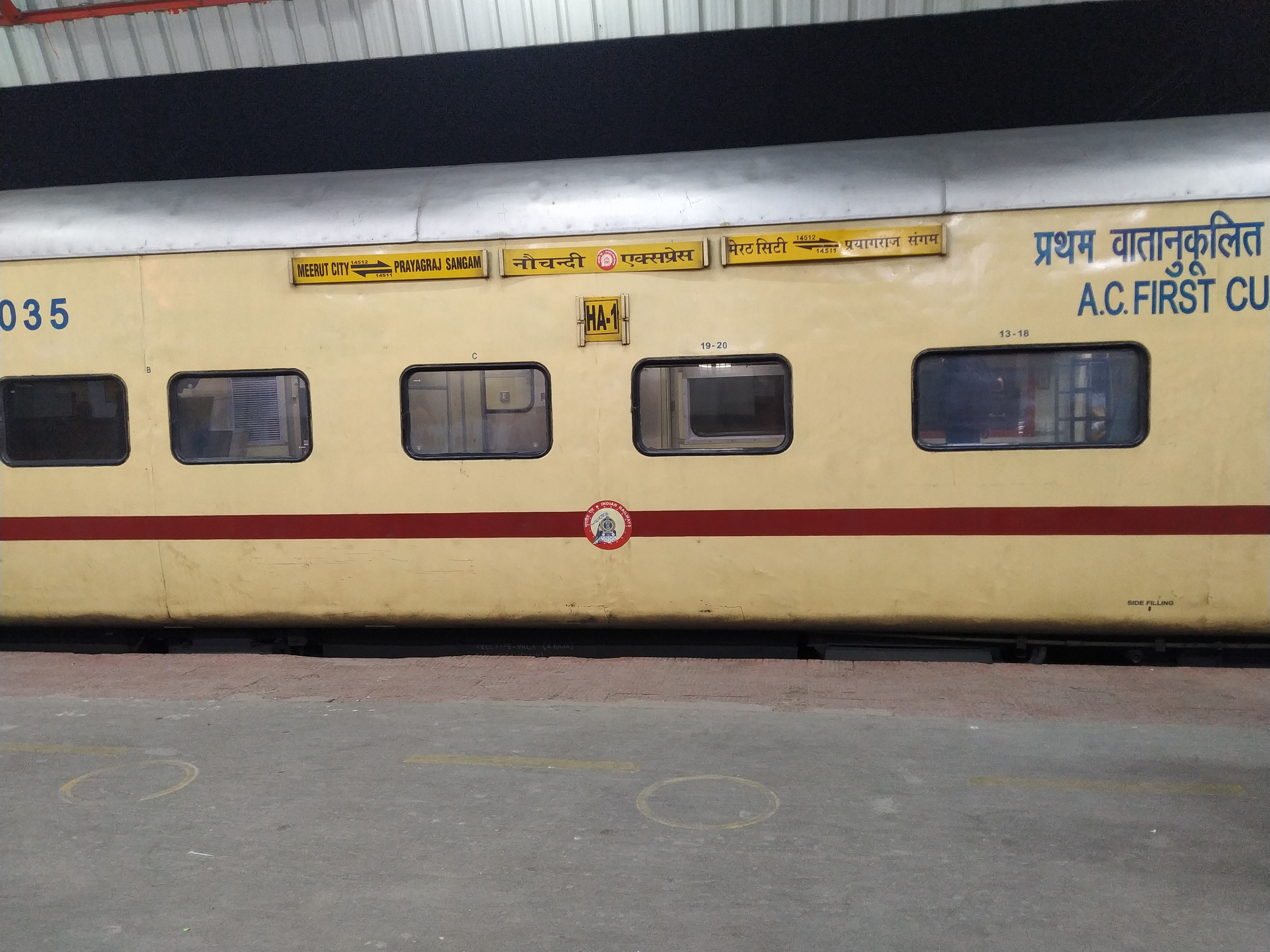
14512 Saharanpur-Prayagraj Sangam Nauchandi Express is standing on Platform 1 of Meerut City Junction.
