= Delhi railway division =

Division of Northern Railway, Indian Railways

Delhi Railway Division is one of the six railway divisions under the jurisdiction of the Northern Railway zone of Indian Railways. Formed in 1952, its headquarters are located at New Delhi. The division is headed by a Divisional Railway Manager (DRM), based at the DRM Office on State Entry Road near New Delhi railway station (Paharganj side). As of July 2023, the Divisional Railway Manager of Delhi Division was Sukhwinder Singh.

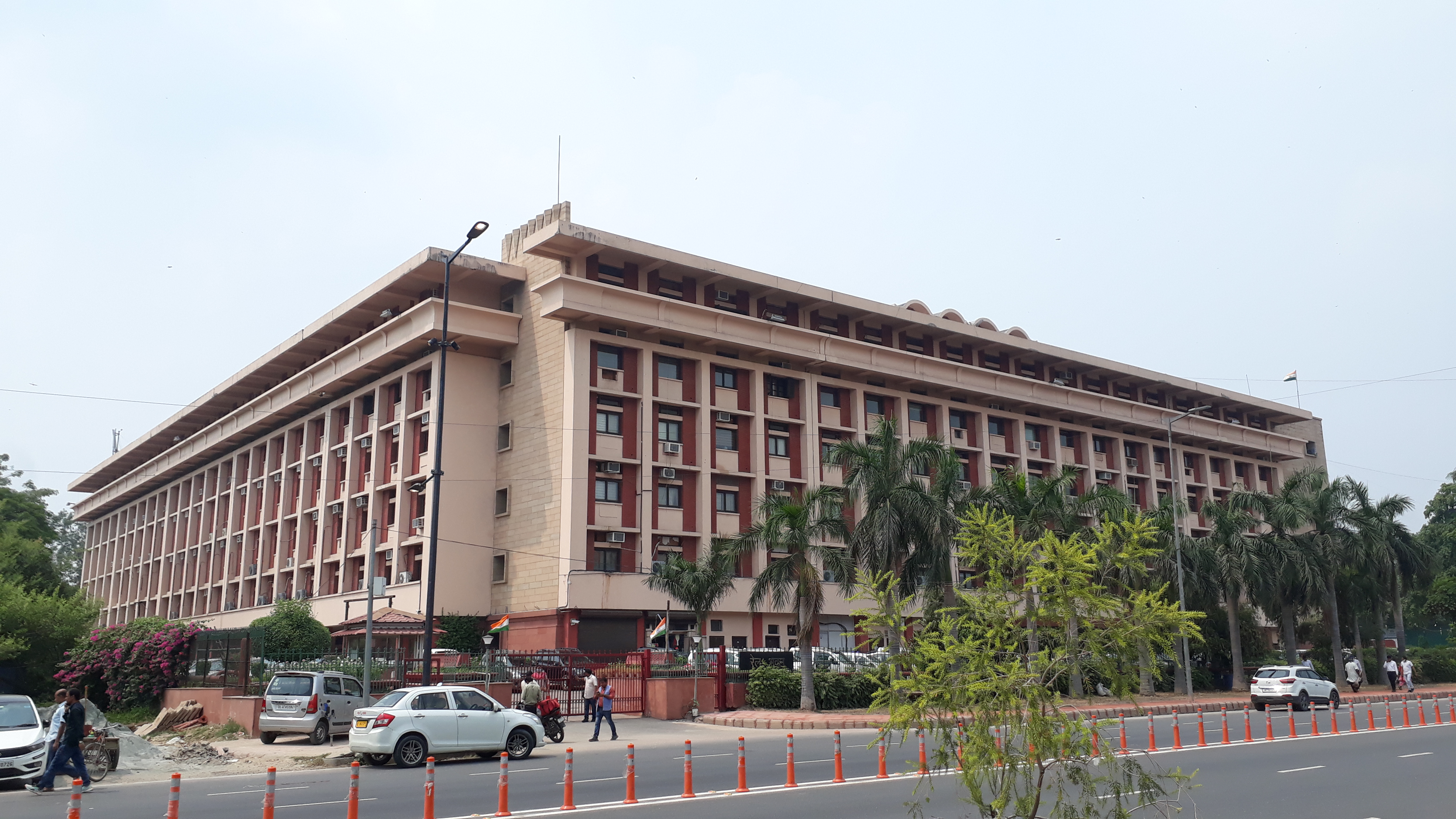
Rail Bhavan in New Delhi

== Northern Railway zone ==
In addition to the Delhi railway division, Ambala railway division, Firozpur railway division, Lucknow NR railway division, and Moradabad railway division are the other railway divisions under the Northern Railway (NR) zone, headquartered at New Delhi.

== Routes and stations network ==
Delhi Division has a route length of 1,386.82 km (861.73 mi) with 213 stations. The division handles 496 passenger-carrying trains and 210 freight trains daily.

== List of railway stations and towns ==
This division serves historical places such as Delhi, Panipat, Karnal, Kurukshetra, Meerut, Palwal, and Faridabad, as well as industrial hubs including Badli, Narela, Sonipat, Guldhar, Modinagar, Partapur, Ballabhgarh, Delhi Cantonment, and Gurgaon. Meerut Cantonment and Delhi Cantonment are important military bases of the Indian Army. The table below lists major stations under the Delhi railway division by category.

Category of station	No. of stations	Names of stations
A-1	4	Delhi Junction, New Delhi, Hazrat Nizamuddin, Anand Vihar Terminal
A	18	Adarsh Nagar Delhi, Ballabhgarh, Delhi Sarai Rohilla, Delhi Cantonment, Delhi Shahdara Junction, Faridabad, Ghaziabad Junction, Gurgaon, Karnal, Meerut City, Meerut Cantt, Muzaffarnagar, Panipat Junction, Jind Junction, Rohtak Junction, Sonipat Junction

== See also ==
- Future of rail transport in India
- Rail transport in India
