= Delhi–Saharanpur main line =

Railway line connecting Old Delhi and Saharanpur

Delhi Junction – Meerut City – Saharanpur
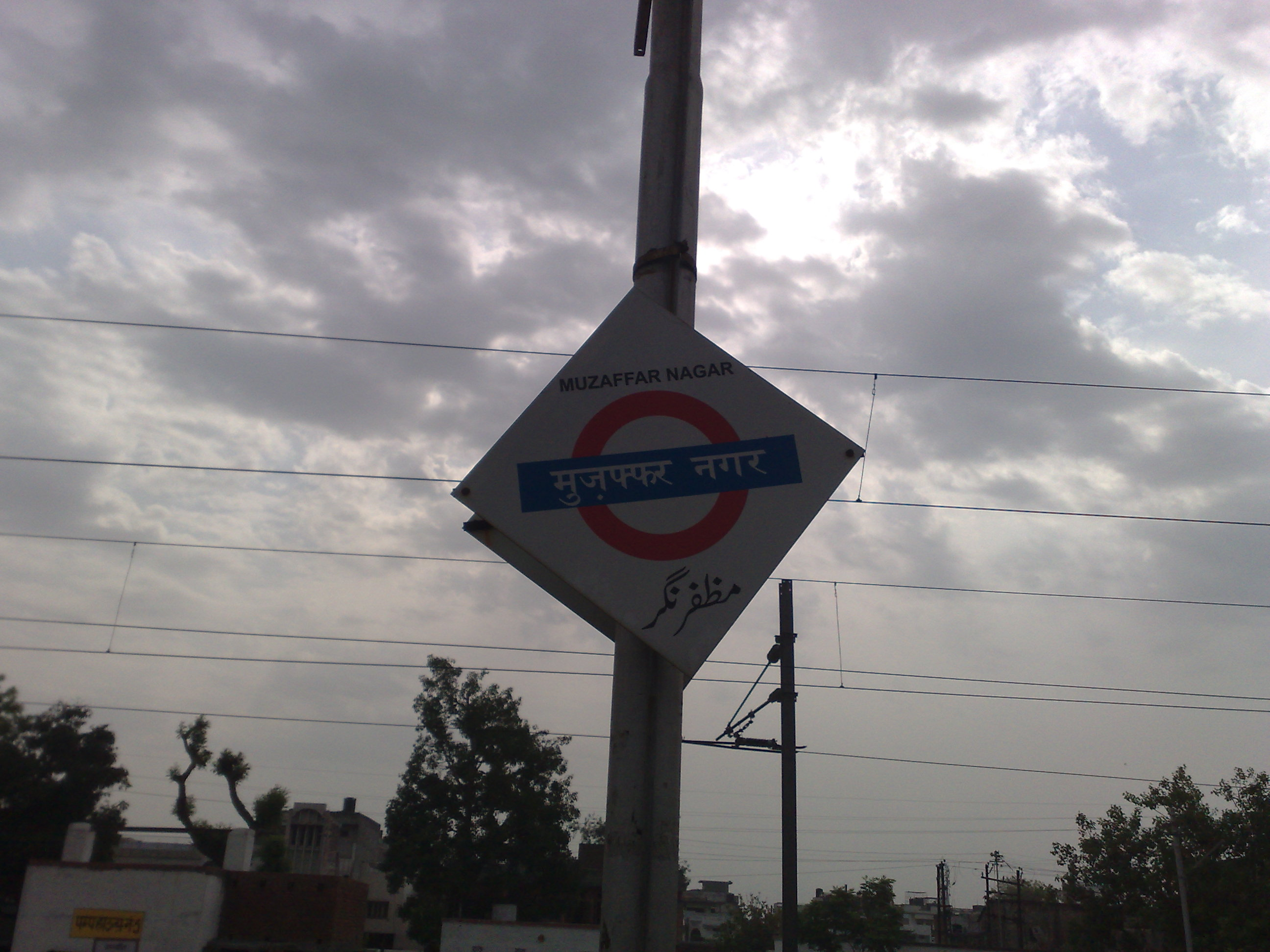
- Muzaffarnagar railway station lies on the Delhi–Meerut–Saharanpur line

Overview
- Status: Operational
- Owner: Indian Railways
- Locale: Delhi, Uttar Pradesh
- Termini: Delhi Junction, New Delhi, Anand Vihar Terminal; Saharanpur

Service
- Operator: Northern Railway

History
- Opened: 1870

Technical
- Line length: 181 km (112 mi)
- Track gauge: 5 ft 6 in (1,676 mm) broad gauge
- Electrification: Yes
- Operating speed: 100 km/h (62 mph)

The Delhi–Meerut–Saharanpur line is a railway line connecting Old Delhi and Saharanpur via Meerut, and includes the Meerut–Khurja branch link. The line falls under the administrative jurisdiction of Northern Railway's Delhi division.

== History ==
The railway line between Old Delhi and Meerut was constructed in 1864.

The Scinde, Punjab & Delhi Railway completed the 483-kilometre-long (300 mi) Amritsar–Ambala–Saharanpur–Ghaziabad line in 1870, connecting Multan (now in Pakistan) with Delhi.

Major stations on this section between Delhi Junction and Saharanpur include Delhi Shahdara, Sahibabad Junction, Ghaziabad Junction, Modinagar, Meerut, Khatauli, Muzaffarnagar, Deoband, and Tapri Junction.

== Infrastructure works ==
=== Electrification ===
As of 12 March 2016, the Old Delhi–Meerut–Saharanpur line, including the Khurja Junction–Meerut–Saharanpur sector, is fully electrified, allowing electric locomotives to operate seamlessly from Delhi to Haridwar and Ambala via Meerut and Saharanpur.

=== Double line ===
The Delhi–Meerut–Saharanpur section is a double-track line, completed in phases:

- Ghaziabad–Muradnagar: 1977
- Muradnagar–Meerut: 2000
- Meerut–Daurala: 13 August 2017
- Daurala–Khatauli: 19 January 2018
- Khatauli–Muzaffarnagar: 22 May 2019
- Muzaffarnagar–Deoband: 6 March 2020
- Deoband–Tapri Junction: 23 December 2020

== Loco shed ==
The Ghaziabad electric loco shed serves the Delhi area. It housed 47 WAP-1 locomotives in 2008, along with WAM-4, WAP-4, WAP-5, WAP-7, and WAG-5HA locomotives.
