= Shajapur =

- Municipality
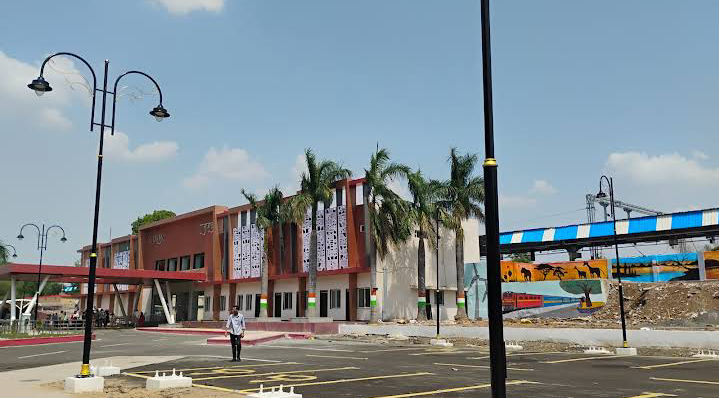
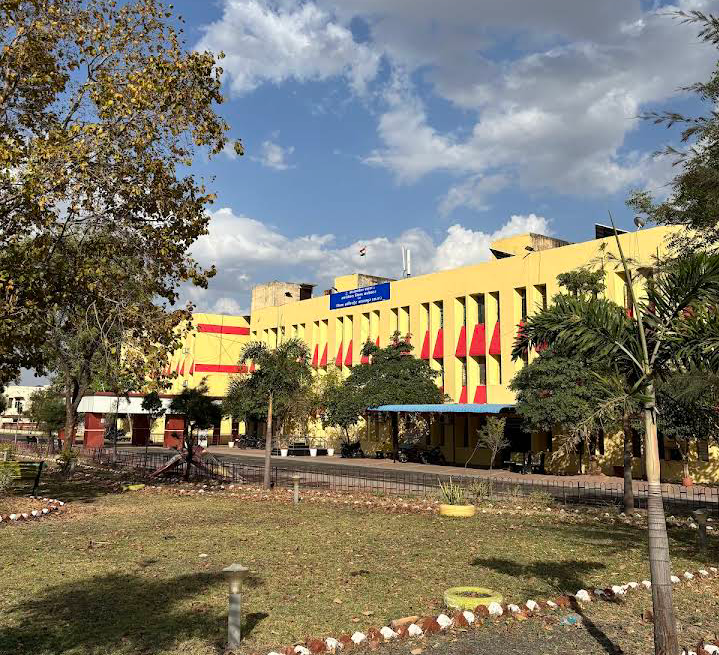
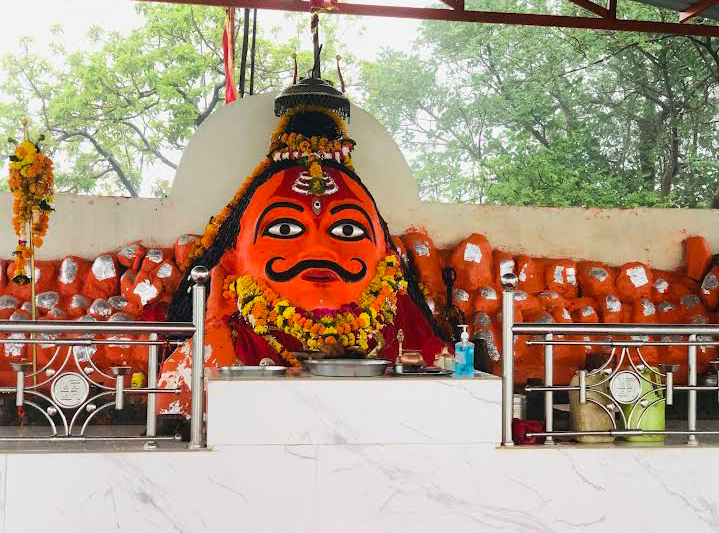
- Shajapur Railway Station Collectrate, Shajapur

- Map showing Shajapur in Madhya Pradesh, India Shajapur (India)
- Coordinates: 23.43°N 76.27°E
- Country: India
- State: Madhya Pradesh
- District: Shajapur
- Vehicle registration: MP-42
- Website: shajapur.nic.in

Shajapur is a town in Malwa region of Madhya Pradesh state in west-central India. It is the headquarters of Shajapur district.

== Geography ==
Shajapur is located at 23.43°N 76.27°E. It has an average elevation of 443 m (1,453 ft). The highest peak is known as Bhairu Dungri. It is located on bank of Chiller river.

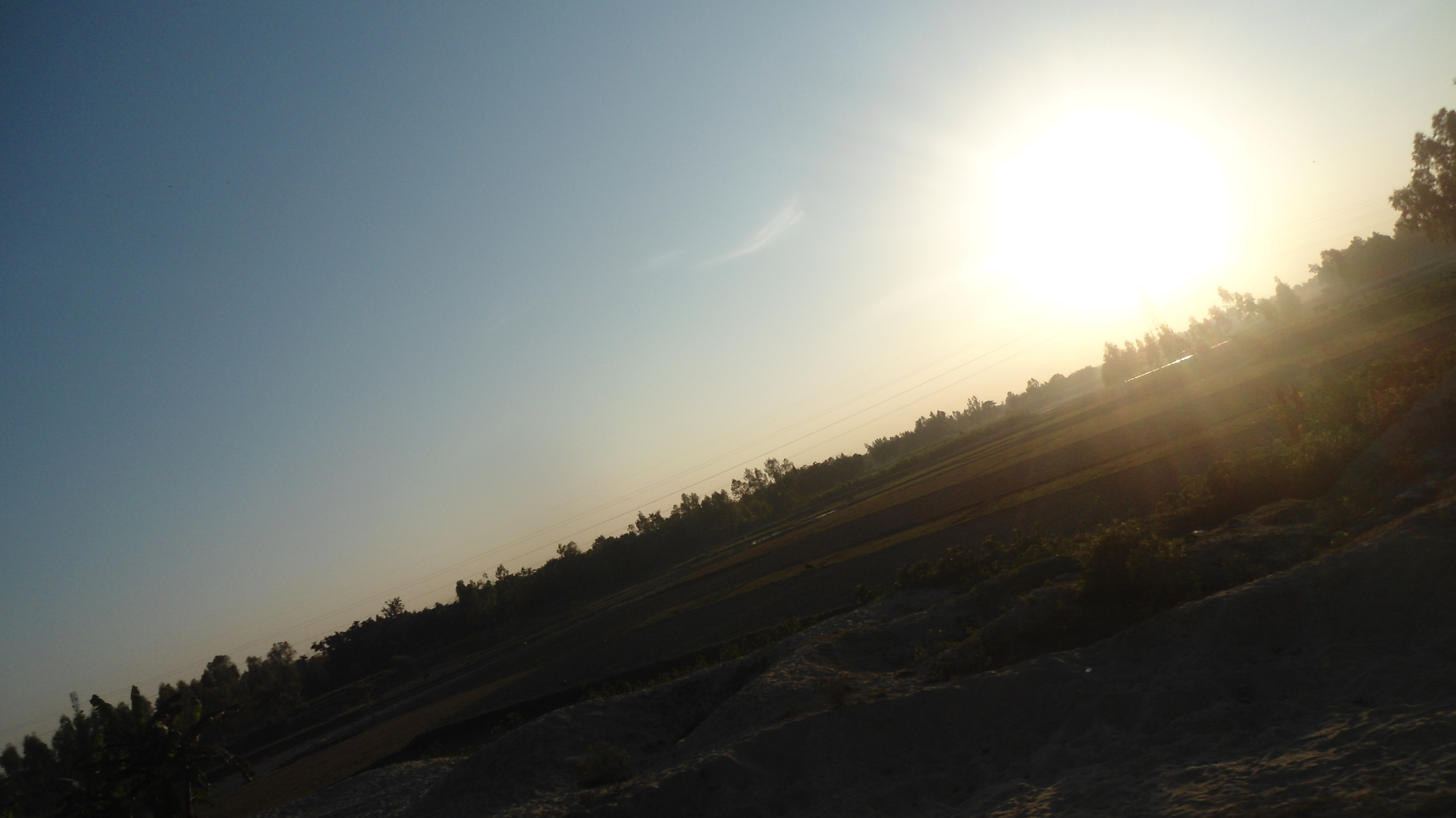
Aerial view of Shajapur from Bhairo Dungri

== Climate ==
Climate data for Shajapur (1991–2020, extremes 1969–2020)
Month	Jan	Feb	Mar	Apr	May	Jun	Jul	Aug	Sep	Oct	Nov	Dec	Year
Record high °C (°F)	33.6 (92.5)	38.3 (100.9)	42.1 (107.8)	45.6 (114.1)	47.3 (117.1)	46.6 (115.9)	40.7 (105.3)	39.1 (102.4)	39.8 (103.6)	39.0 (102.2)	36.1 (97.0)	32.7 (90.9)	47.2 (117.0)
Mean daily maximum °C (°F)	25.8 (78.4)	29.3 (84.7)	35.1 (95.2)	39.7 (103.5)	41.8 (107.2)	38.2 (100.8)	31.9 (89.4)	29.8 (85.6)	32.1 (89.8)	33.9 (93.0)	30.5 (86.9)	27.3 (81.1)	32.9 (91.2)
Mean daily minimum °C (°F)	8.6 (47.5)	11.0 (51.8)	16.0 (60.8)	21.9 (71.4)	26.6 (79.9)	26.0 (78.8)	24.1 (75.4)	23.2 (73.8)	22.3 (72.1)	18.2 (64.8)	13.2 (55.8)	9.6 (49.3)	18.3 (64.9)
Record low °C (°F)	−0.5 (31.1)	1.5 (34.7)	5.1 (41.2)	9.3 (48.7)	17.8 (64.0)	20.3 (68.5)	19.6 (67.3)	20.0 (68.0)	12.1 (53.8)	9.5 (49.1)	3.3 (37.9)	2.1 (35.8)	−0.5 (31.1)
Average rainfall mm (inches)	4.9 (0.19)	3.9 (0.15)	1.6 (0.06)	2.7 (0.11)	8.6 (0.34)	92.6 (3.65)	262.8 (10.35)	260.1 (10.24)	126.6 (4.98)	18.6 (0.73)	8.3 (0.33)	3.1 (0.12)	793.8 (31.25)
Average rainy days	0.3	0.3	0.4	0.4	0.7	4.9	10.2	9.4	5.8	1.3	0.7	0.1	34.5
Average relative humidity (%) (at 17:30 IST)	43	33	24	19	21	44	69	76	66	43	44	47	44
Source: India Meteorological Department

== Demographics ==
As of 2011 India census, Shajapur Municipality has population of 69,263 of which 35,623 are males while 33,640 are females. In Shajapur Municipality, the female sex ratio is 944. Moreover the child sex ratio in Shajapur is around 920 compared to Madhya Pradesh state average of 918. The literacy rate of Shajapur city is 85.47%.

Religion in Shajapur
Religion	Percent
Hindus	63.93%
Muslims	34.10%
Jains	1.43%
Others†	0.5%
Christians	0.26%
Distribution of religions †Includes Sikhs (0.10%), Buddhists (0.03).

== Government and administration ==
- Government:

Shajapur City is under in Shajapur Assembly, Shajapur Assembly constituency is one of the 230 Vidhan Sabha (Legislative Assembly) constituencies of Madhya Pradesh state in central India. Arun Bhimawad is MLA from Shajapur Assembly.

- Administration:

Shajapur is a Municipality city. Shajapur city is divided into 29 wards for which elections are held every 5 years.Shajapur Municipality has total administration over 13,066 houses to which it supplies basic amenities like water and sewerage. It is also authorize to build roads within Municipality limits and impose taxes on properties coming under its jurisdiction.

== Popular in media ==
In the opening scenes of the popular yesteryear's Hindi film, Shree 420, the protagonist (Raj Kapoor) finds a road crossing showing the direction to three places, of which one is Shajapur. The other two are Dewas and Bombay.

In Bollywood Movie Oh My God 2, main protagonist Kanti Sharan mudgal is depicted as originally native of city of Shajapur.

== Tourism ==
- Rajrajeshwari Mata Mandir - This is Most Popular Place in Shajapur, Here is Devi Raj rajeshwari Devi idol. People go here in Navratri. Idols of Riddhi-Siddhi and Ganapati have also been installed in the temple. A well is also in the temple area. Dharamshala has also been built by the devotees. This temple is the center of faith.
- Bhairav Tekri - Bhairav Tekri, located in Shajapur, is 1,999 feet above sea level. From the top of the Tekri, a panoramic view of the area is visible. Devotees must climb 511 steps to reach Bhairav Baba's darshan.
- Muradpur Hanumaan Mandir
- Girwar Hanumaan Mandir
- Parshavnath Mandir
- Karedi Mata Mandir
- Dargah E Yasufi - This Dargah is present in Shajapur city. Many people come here from far off places with their wishes. There are ample facilities available here for the people who come from far away places to stay. This Dargah is considered as a miraculous Dargah.
- Shahi Qila (Shajapur Fort) - In 1640, Mughal emperor Shahjahan had built a grand fort here. This fort has many windows and rooms along with huge grounds.This is an ancient building and it is very beautiful. Inside the fort there is a temple of Lord Shiva and a beautiful garden.

== Culture and heritage ==
Kans Vadotsav, celebrated in Shajapur, Madhya Pradesh, is a traditional festival with deep religious and historical significance. Observed annually on Dashmi night, it has been a part of the local culture for over 150 years.

== Economy ==
The economy of Shajapur is mainly dependent on agriculture. Being located in the Kali Sindh basin, the land here is fertile. Wheat and soybean are the primary crops grown, with onion and garlic also being major products in the region.

Maksi is a key industrial area in Shajapur, hosting many small and large industries that provide employment. Notable industries include Maksi's Dabur Plant and Shujalpur's Adani Wilmar Plant, along with various food processing plants. Additionally, there are some windmills and solar plants in the region.

Madhya Pradesh I Solar Park in the Shajapur district is a 200 megawatt (MWDC) photovoltaic power station, which is under construction.

== Education ==
Many Government and Private College & Schools located in Shajapur,

1. BKSN Degree College, Shajapur
2. Govt Girl's College, Shajapur
3. Govt Polytechnic College, Shajapur
4. Govt law College, Shajapur
5. Career ITI College, Shajapur
6. Govt. ITI College, Shajapur
7. Saraswati Vidya Mandir Shajapur
8. M.G.Convent School Shajapur
9. Central School Shajapur
10. Kautilya Education Academy
11. Eternal School of Stuidies
12. Sahaj Public School

Many Govt and Private School Located in Shajapur, High school, Middle School and Primary School.

== Notable people ==
- Nand Kishore Bhatt, Indian Politician, Freedom Activist, Trade Unionist and former Member of Parliament
- Naresh Mehta, Author, Poet
- Bal Krishna Sharma Naveen, Author, Freedom activist, Poet, Politician, Journalist
- Arun Bhimawad, Indian Politician and MLA
- Jagannathrao Joshi, Indian Politician and former MP
- Liladhar Joshi, Former Chif Minister Of Madhya Bharat State and Politician
- Hukum Singh Karada, Indian Politician and MLA
- Bhaiyyu Maharaj, Spiritual guru
- Aalok Shrivastav, Indian Writer, Lyricist
- Phool Chand Verma, Indian Politician and former MP

== Transportation ==
Shajapur is well Connected by Roads and Railway. Roadway- Biaora - Dhule section of National Highway NH 52 passed through Shajapur. Shajapur is Connected other major city of state by road like Indore, Bhopal, Ujjain, Dewas, Gwalior.

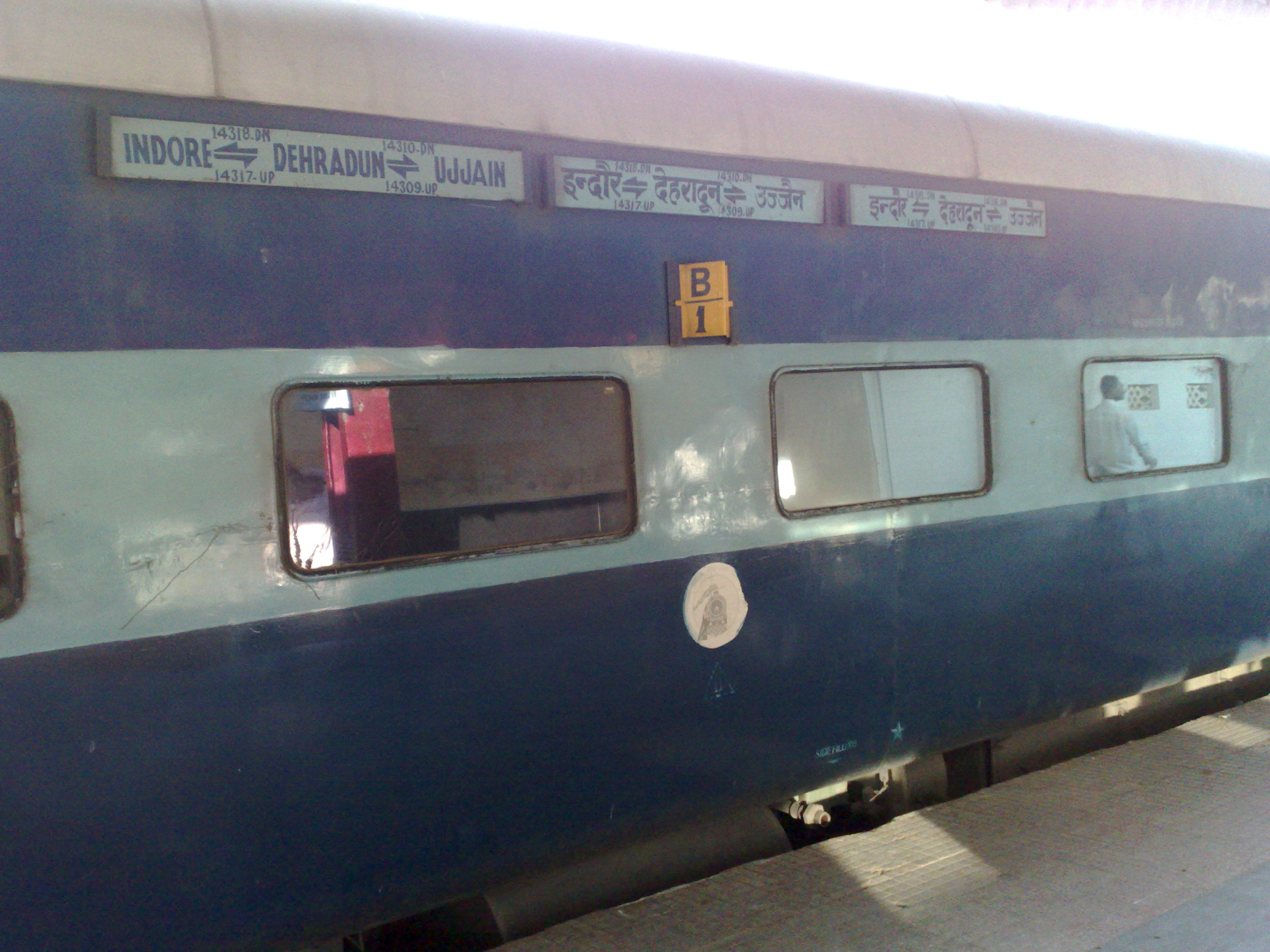
Indore Dehradun Express arrive at Shajapur

Railway - Shajapur is located on Gwalior Indore Line. Major train is halting in Shajapur railway station. It's Well connected with mejor city by Railway. Trains Halting in Shajapur:

- Jhansi–Bandra Terminus Express
- Indore–Amritsar Express
- Indore–Dehradun Express
- Indore–Kota Intercity Express
- Ratlam–Gwalior Intercity Express
- Gorakhpur–Okha Express
