= Muzaffarnagar railway station =

Railway station in Uttar Pradesh

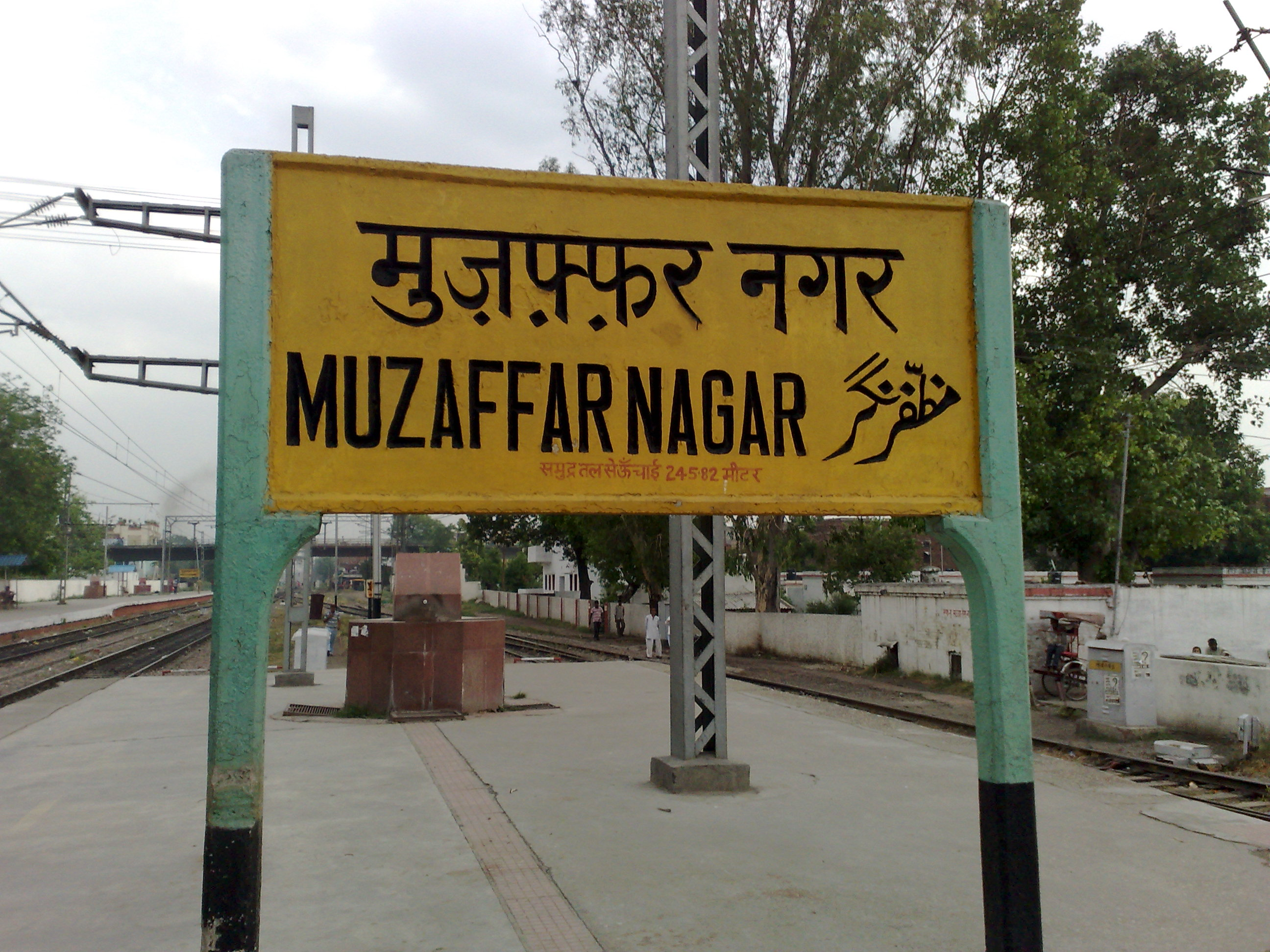
- Muzaffarnagar Railway Station

General information
- Location: New Mandi, Muzaffarnagar, UP 251001
- Coordinates: 29.4693°N 77.7083°E
- Elevation: 245.820 metres (806.50 ft)
- System: Indian Railways station
- Owner: Ministry of Railways (India)
- Operator: Indian Railways
- Line: Delhi-Meerut–Saharanpur line
- Platforms: 5*
- Tracks: 5*

Construction
- Structure type: At grade
- Parking: Available

Other information
- Status: Functional
- Station code: MOZ
- Zone(s): Northern Railway
- Division(s): Delhi
- Fare zone: Northern Railways

History
- Opened: 1870
Location
- Location within India Location within Uttar Pradesh

Muzaffarnagar railway station is a station on the Northern Railway network. It comes under Delhi Division of Northern Railway. And provide connectivity to major cities of India mainly Delhi, Chennai, Mumbai, Lucknow etc. It is an important station on Delhi-Meerut-Saharanpur line. It is almost in the middle of the entire route. It also lies on the main route of Northern freight corridor. Almost all the freight of Uttrakhand passes through here.

== History ==
Work of doubling of Delhi-Meerut–Saharanpur tracks was completed from 2015 to 2016.

== Trains ==
Some of the important trains that pass through Muzaffarnagar are:

- 18237/38 Chhattisgarh Express
- 12205/06 Dehradun AC Express
- 12904/04 Golden Temple Mail
- 12055/56 Dehradun Jan Shatabdi Express
- 12017/18 Dehradun Shatabdi Express
- 14511/12 Nauchandi Express
- 19019/20 Bandra Terminus–Dehradun Express
- 19325/26 Indore–Amritsar Express
- 14309/10 Ujjaini Express
- 12687/88 Madurai–Dehradun Express
- 14681/82 Jalandhar City–New Delhi Intercity Express
- 14521/22 Delhi–Ambala Cantonment Intercity Express
- 14646/45 Shalimar Express
- 04401/02 Anand Vihar Terminal–Udhampur Superfast Express
- 12205/06 Nanda Devi AC Express
- 19031/32 Yoga Express
- 22659/60 Kochuveli–Dehradun Superfast Express
- 19565/66 Uttaranchal Express
- 12911/12 Valsad–Haridwar Superfast Express
- 18477/78 Kalinga Utkal Express

There are one Shatabdi Express, one Jan Shatabadi Express, one AC Superfast Express, six Superfast Express, fourteen Mail/Express, four MEMU, and four Passenger trains on this route.

== Gallery ==
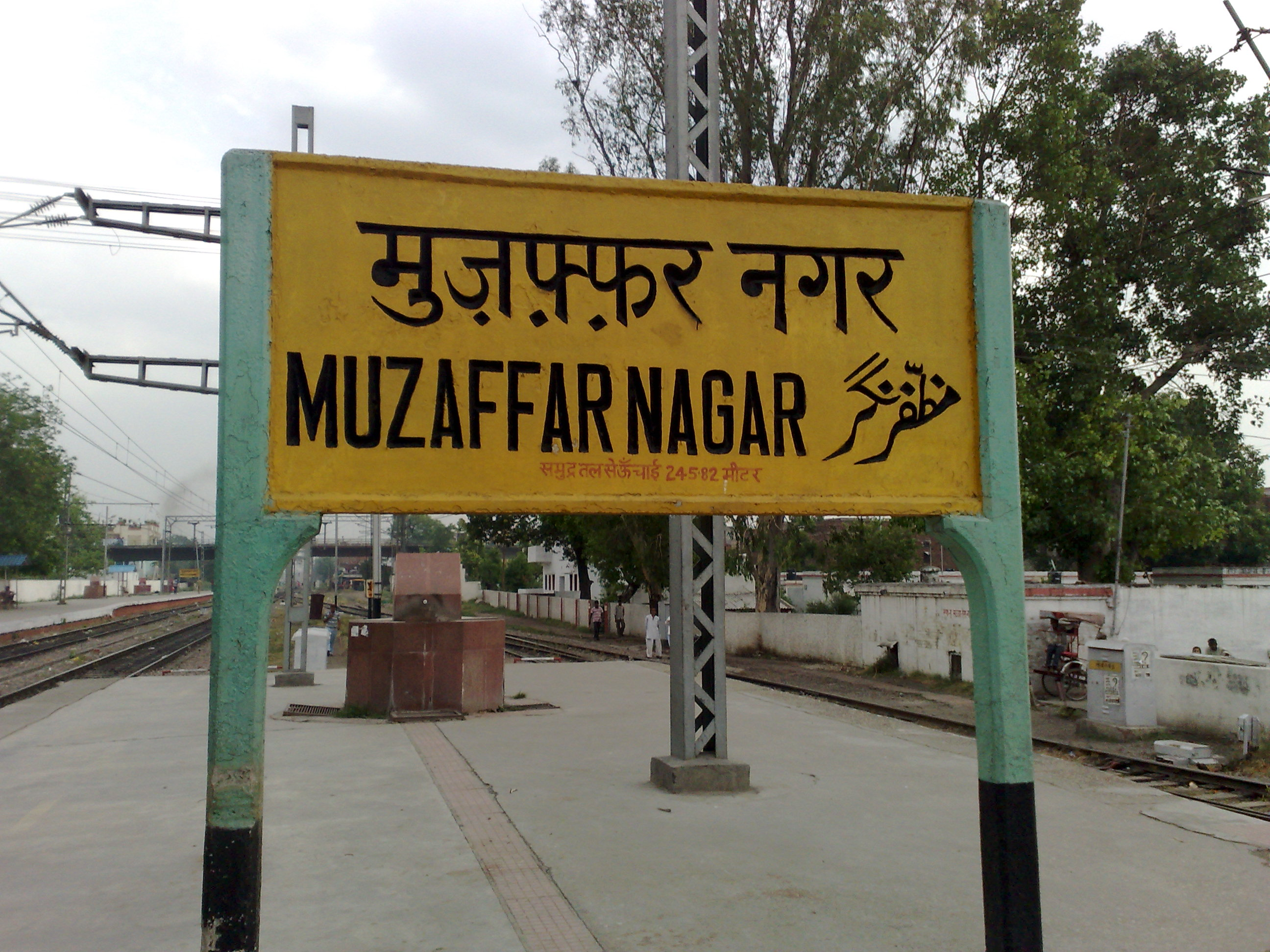
Platform board at Muzaffarnagar railway station

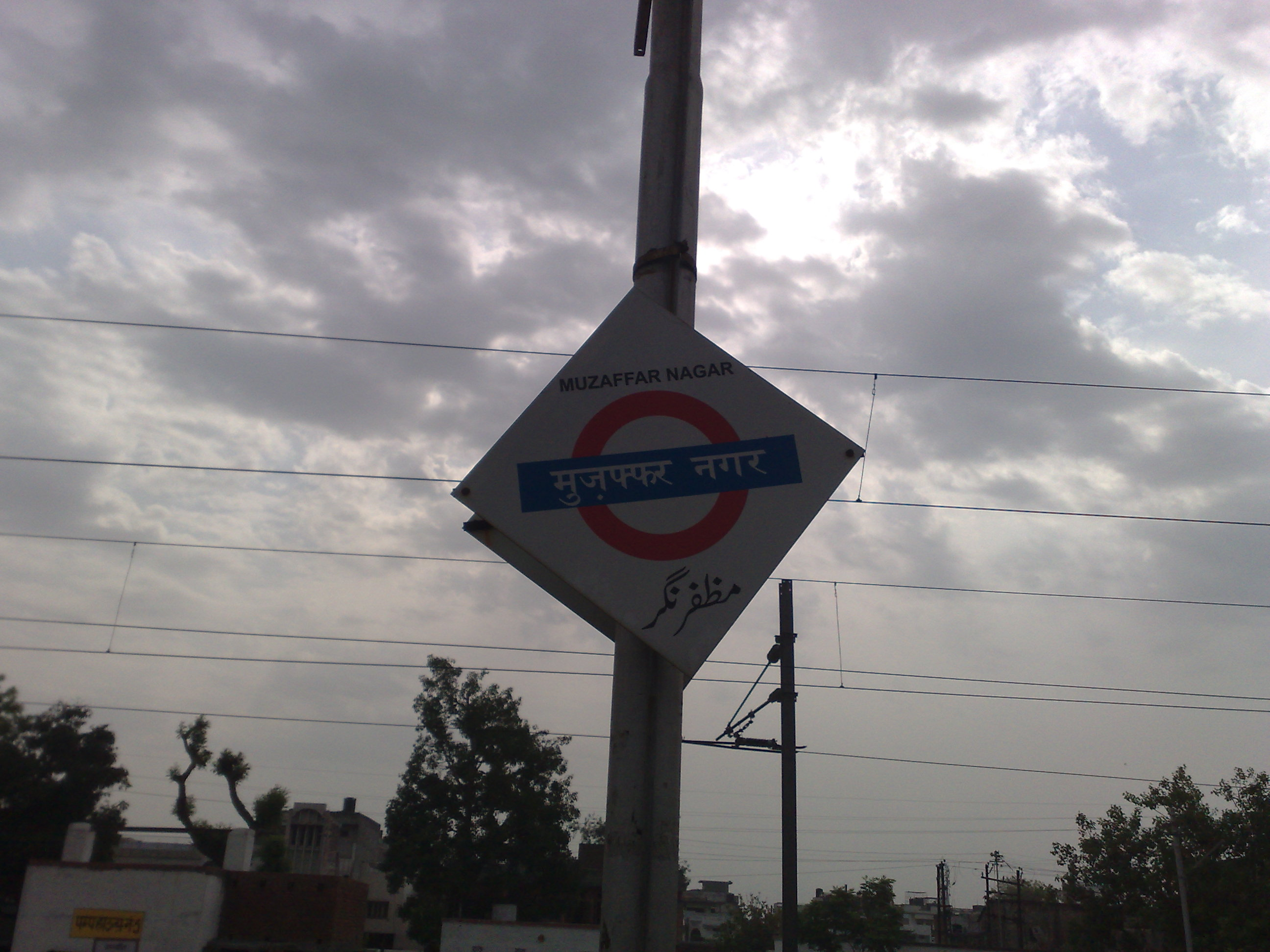
Muzaffarnagar railway station – platform board

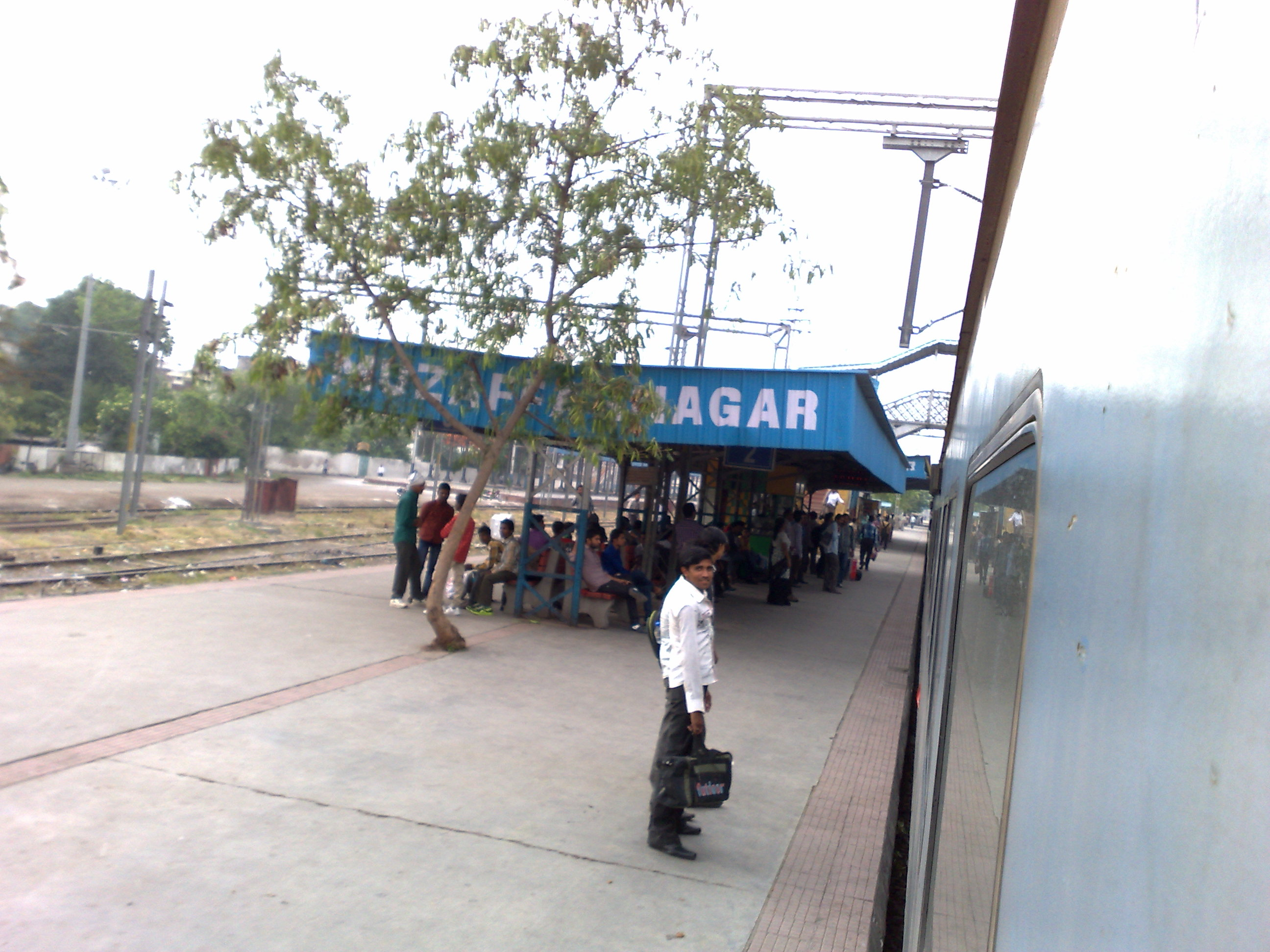
12017 Dehradun Shatabdi Express at Muzaffarnagar
