= Biyavra Rajgarh railway station =

Railway station in Biyavra, India

Biyavra Rajgarh

General information
- Location: Biyavra, Rajgarh district, Madhya Pradesh; India
- Coordinates: 23°56′13″N 76°54′29″E
- System: Indian Railways station
- Owner: Indian Railways
- Operator: West Central Railway
- Line: Indore–Gwalior line
- Platforms: 2
- Tracks: 2

Construction
- Structure type: Standard (on ground)
- Parking: Yes
- Cycle facilities: No

Other information
- Status: Functioning
- Station code: BRRG
- Zone(s): West Central Railway
- Division(s): Bhopal
Location
- Location within India Location within Madhya Pradesh

Biyavra Rajgarh railway station is a railway station in Rajgarh district, Madhya Pradesh. Its code is BRRG. It serves Biyavra city. The station consists of two platforms. It lacks many facilities including water and sanitation. Passenger, Express, and Superfast trains halt here.

== Trains ==
The following trains halt at Biyavra Rajgarh railway station in both directions:

- Ratlam–Gwalior Express
- Ratlam–Bhind Express
- Gorakhpur–Okha Express
- Ujjaini Express
- Indore–Kota Intercity Express
- Indore–Chandigarh Express
- Ahmedabad–Darbhanga Sabarmati Express
- Sabarmati Express
- Indore–Amritsar Express
- Pune–Gwalior Weekly Express
- Indore–Dehradun Express
- Jhansi–Bandra Terminus Express
- Surat–Muzaffarpur Express

== Ramganj Mandi-Bhopal Railway Line ==
Bhopal-Ramganj Mandi line - under-construction with target completion by December 2027: a new Rs3,035 cr 276-km long greenfield line connecting Bhopal in the southeast to Kota in northwest via Ramganj Mandi-Aklera-Rajgarh-Biaora. In March 2026, 50% of the 276 km track was complete (Ramganj Mandi-Rajgarh section in the north) and the remaining Rajgarh-Bhopal section in the south was under-construction. After the construction of this railway line, Biyavra will become an important railway junction.
