= Nanda Devi AC Express =

Train in India

Nanda Devi AC Superfast Express

Overview
- Service type: AC Express
- Locale: Rajasthan, Haryana, Delhi, Uttar Pradesh & Uttarakhand
- First service: 1 July 2008; 17 years ago
- Current operator: Northern Railway

Route
- Termini: Kota Junction (KOTA); Dehradun (DDN)
- Stops: 11
- Distance travelled: 763 km (474 mi)
- Average journey time: 11 hours 45 minutes
- Service frequency: Daily
- Train number: 12401 / 12402

On-board services
- Classes: AC First Class, AC 2 Tier, AC 3 Tier
- Seating arrangements: No
- Sleeping arrangements: Yes
- Catering facilities: On-board catering, E-catering
- Observation facilities: Large windows
- Baggage facilities: Available
- Other facilities: Below the seats

Technical
- Rolling stock: LHB coach
- Track gauge: 1,676 mm (5 ft 6 in)
- Operating speed: 130 km/h (81 mph) maximum, 65 km/h (40 mph) average including halts.

The 12401 / 12402 Nanda Devi AC Express train belonging to Indian Railways that runs between Kota Junction & Dehradun in India. It is a daily service. It operates as train number 12401 from Kota Junction to Dehradun and as train number 12402 in the reverse direction. At first it ran between New Delhi & Dehradun as train number 12205 & 12206.

Since 26 August 2019 it was extended up to Kota Junction, skipping New Delhi. It stops at Hazrat Nizamuddin while following the same route and same timings from Ghaziabad Junction to Dehradun.Earlier this train used to run as New Delhi Dehradun AC Express from New Delhi from 25/09/2010 till 07/10/2014 and then was renamed as "Nanda Devi Express".This train used to originate from Hazrat Nizamuddin before 25/09/2010.

== Coaches ==
The 12401/12402 Nanda Devi AC Express has 2 AC First Class, 4 AC Two Tier, 7 AC Three Tier coaches along with 2 End on generation cars. As with most train services in India, coach composition may be amended at the discretion of Indian Railways depending on demand.

EOG || B7 || B6 || B5 || B4 || B3 || B2 || B1 || A4 || A3 || A2 || A1 || H2 || H1 || EOG

== Service ==
It is a daily train & covers the distance of 763 kilometres in 11 hours 45 minutes as 12401 Nanda Devi AC Express (65 km/h)and in 11 hours 45 minutes as 12402 Nanda Devi AC Express (65 km/h). It has a Superfast surcharge.

== Route & halts ==
The train runs from Kota Junction via Sawai Madhopur Junction, Gangapur City, Hindaun City, Bharatpur Junction, Mathura Junction, Hazrat Nizamuddin, Ghaziabad Junction, Meerut City Junction, Muzaffarnagar, Roorkee, Haridwar to Dehradun.

== Traction ==
It is hauled by a Tughlakabad Loco Shed based WAP-7 or WAP-5 electric locomotive on its entire journey.

== Operation ==
- 12401 Nanda Devi AC Express leaves Kota Junction on a daily basis at 17:55 hrs and reaches Dehradun the next day at 05:40 hrs.
- 12402 Nanda Devi AC Express leaves Dehradun on a daily basis at 22:50 hrs and reaches Kota Junction the next day at 10:35 hrs.

From 25 August 2019, it operate as 12401 / 12402 Dehradun Kota Nanda Devi AC Express with stoppage at Hazrat Nizamuddin instead of New Delhi. Before that, it used to run between Dehradun & New Delhi as 12205/12206.

== Gallery ==
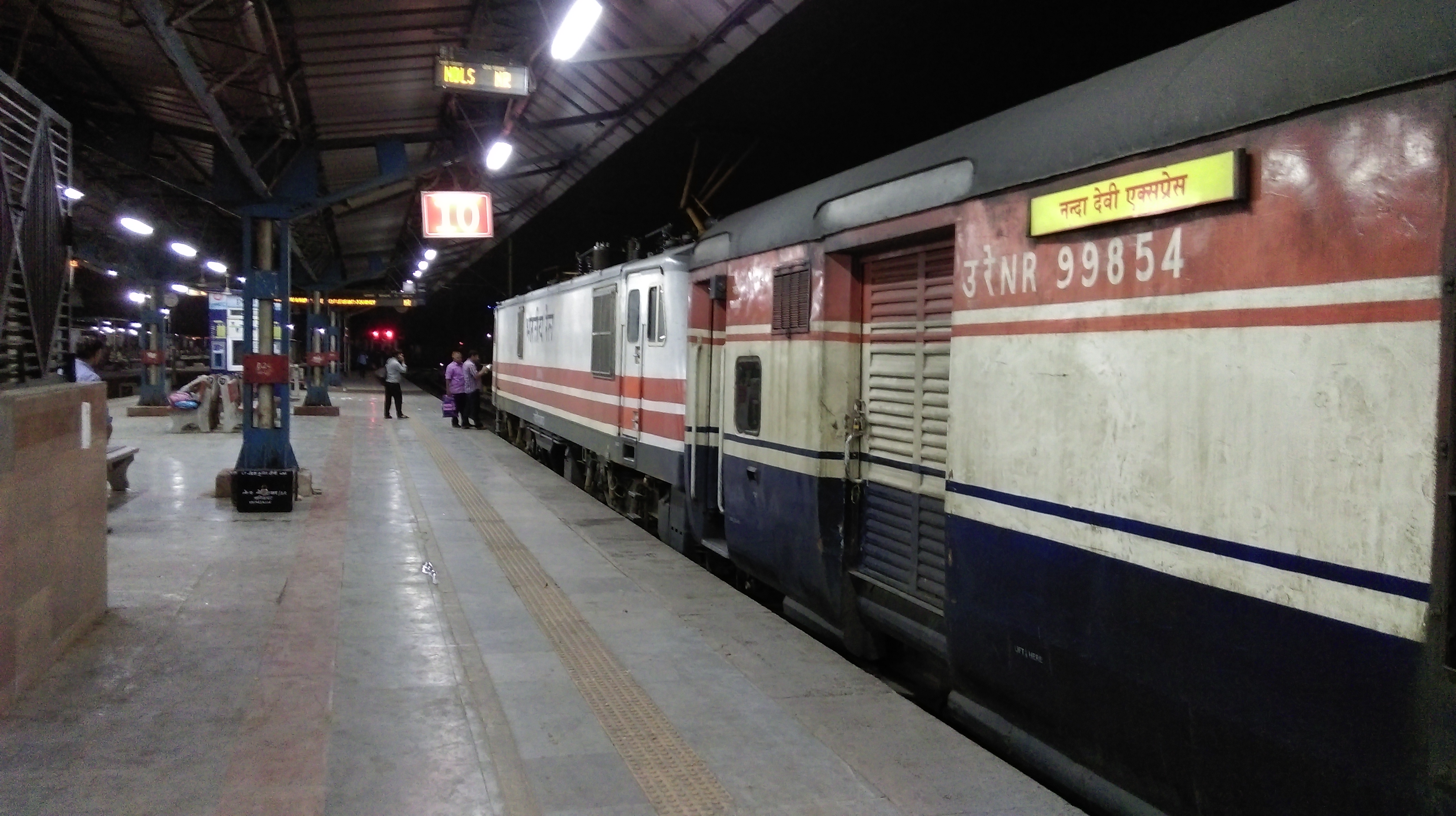
Nanda Devi Express headed by a Ghaziabad-based WAP-5

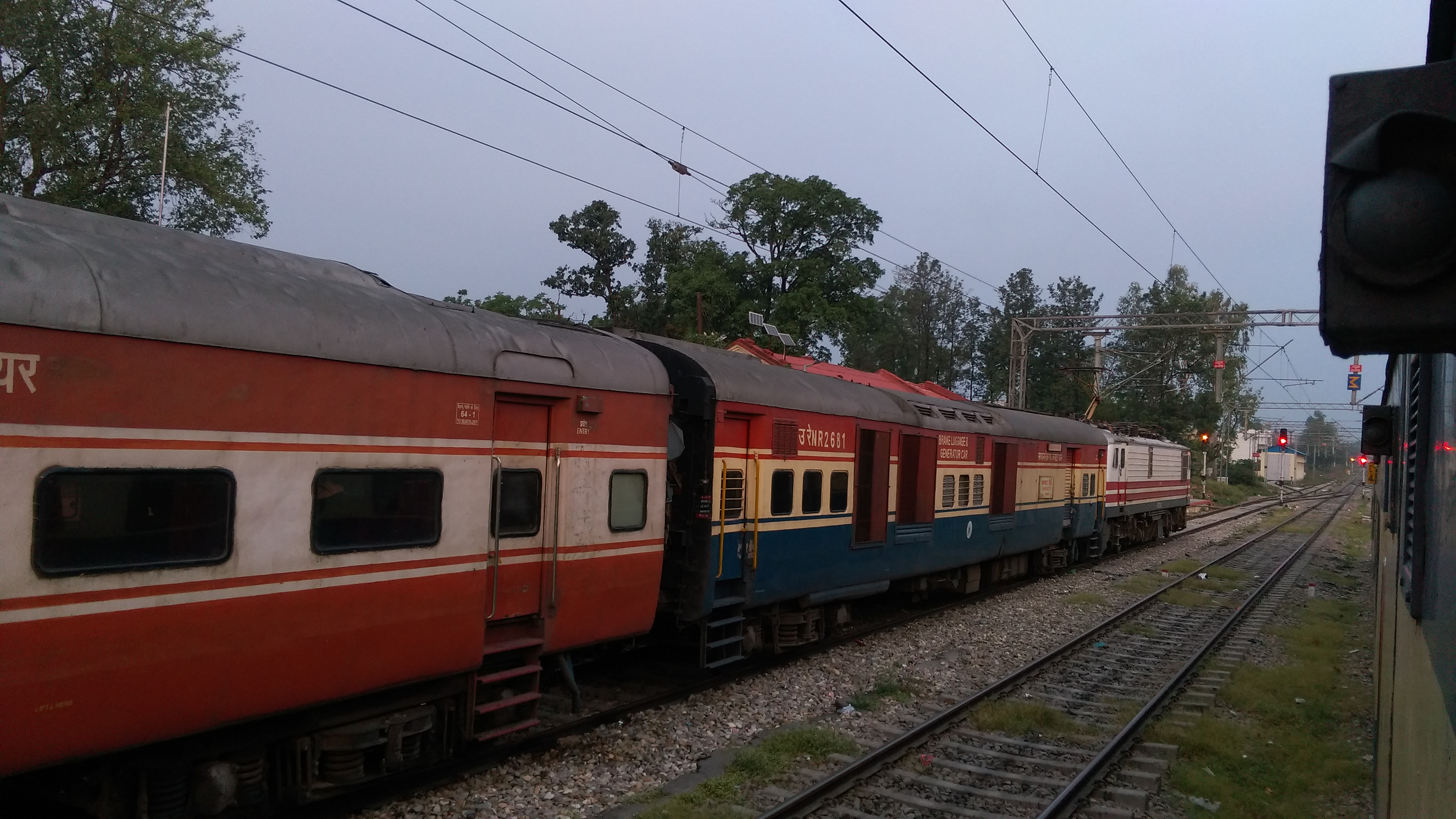
12205 Nanda Devi Express at Harrawala

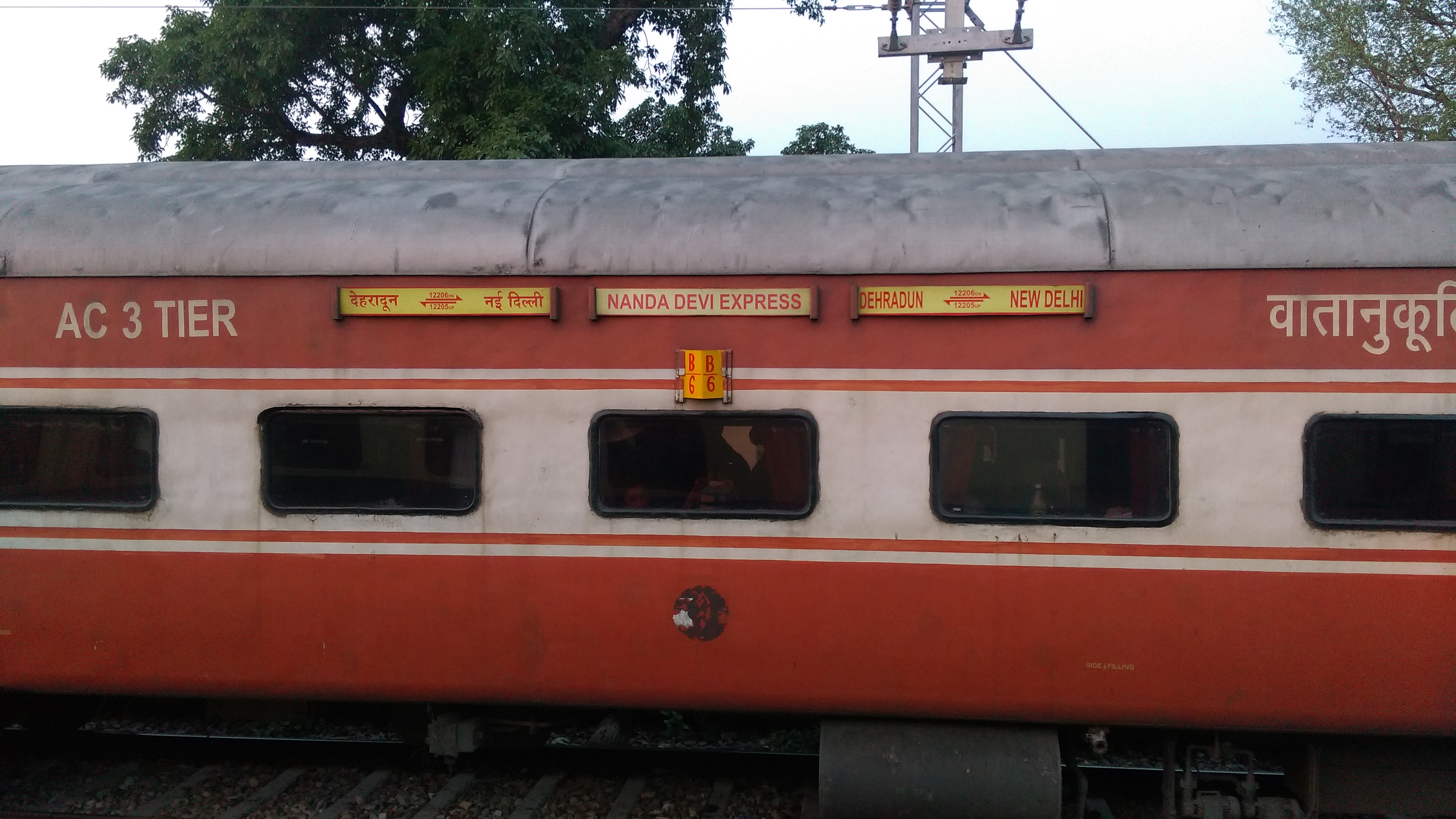
12205 Nanda Devi Express – AC 3 tier coach

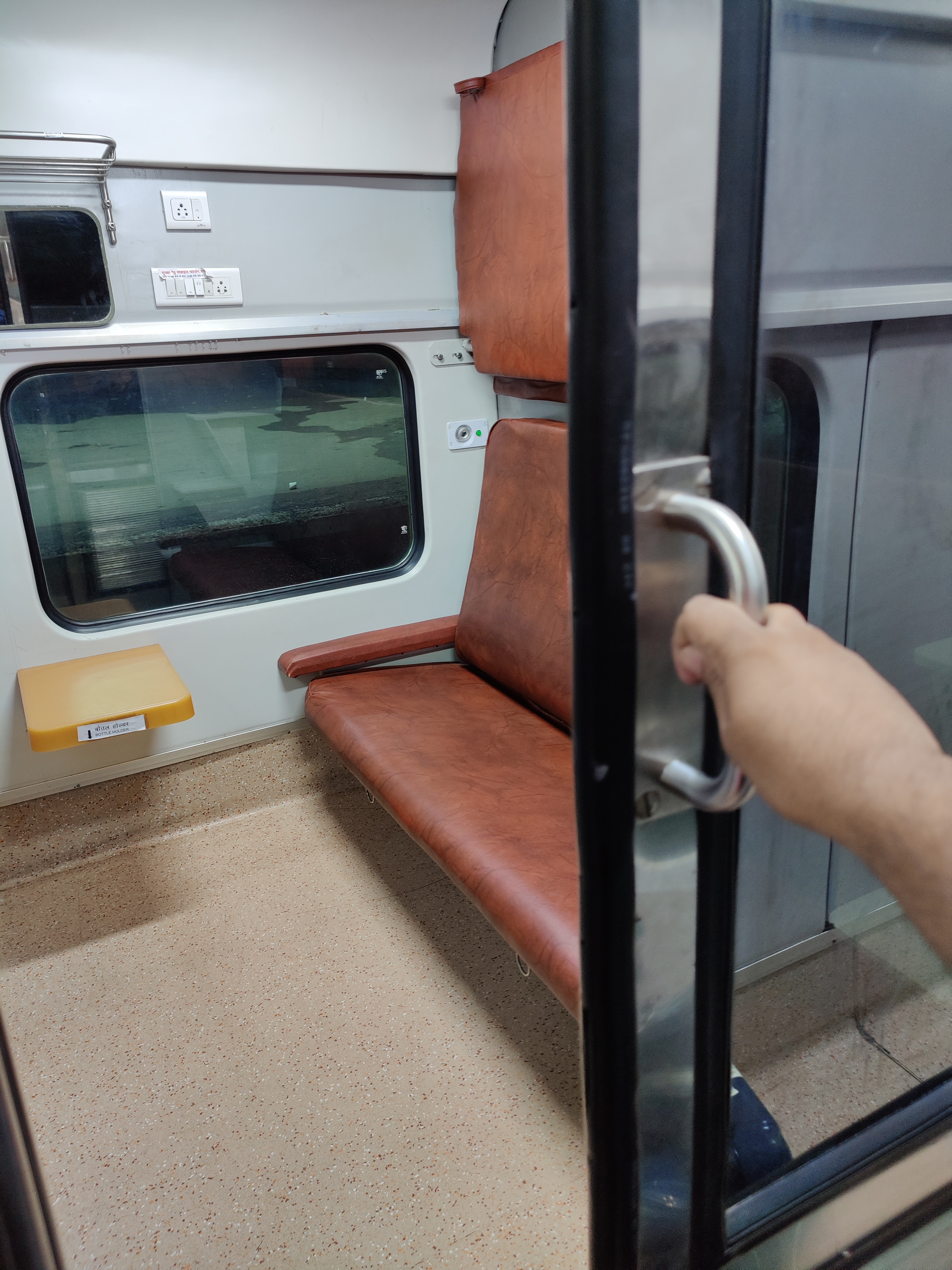
1A Coupe Interior. Private cabin for Two.

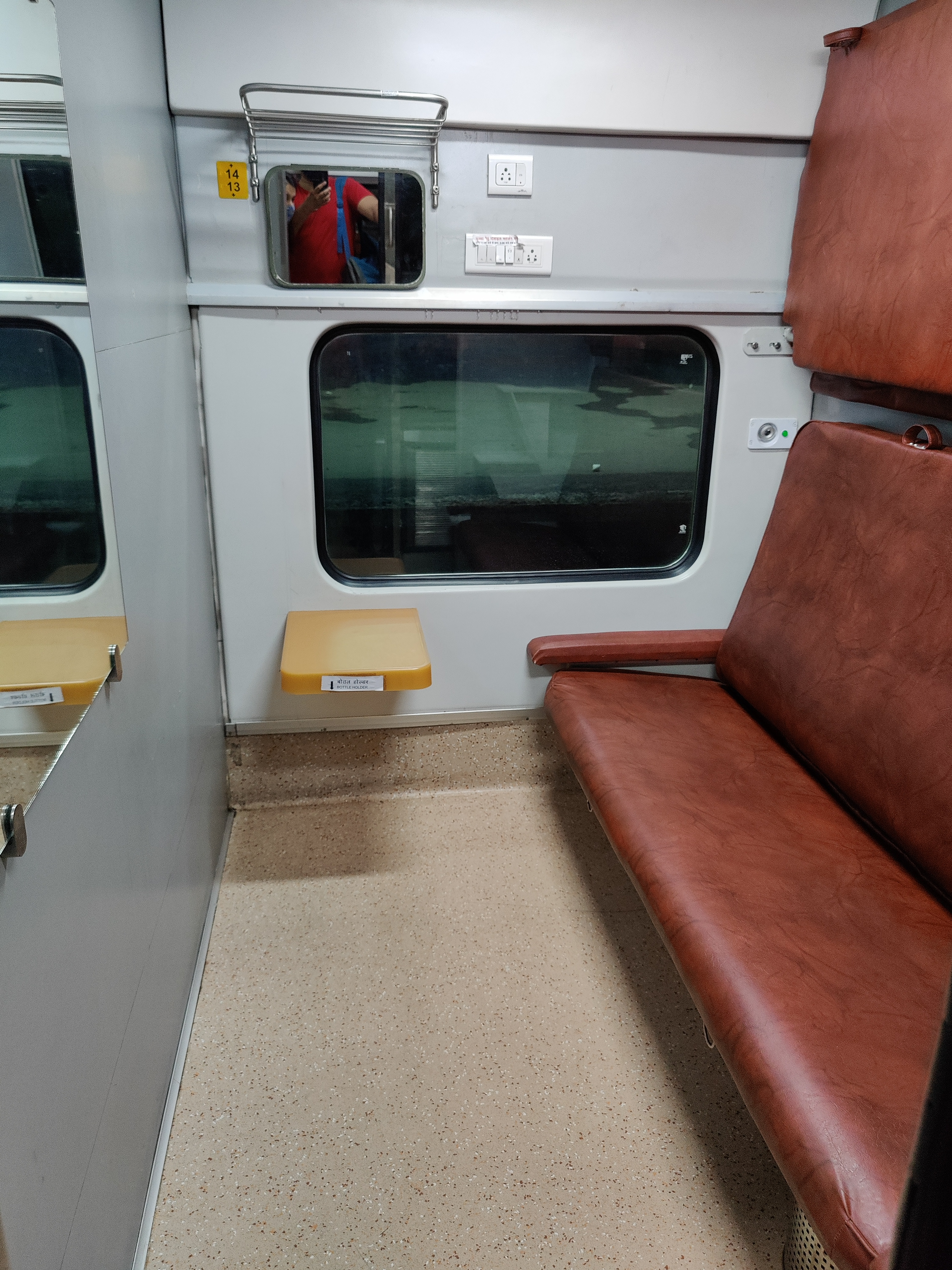
1st AC interior

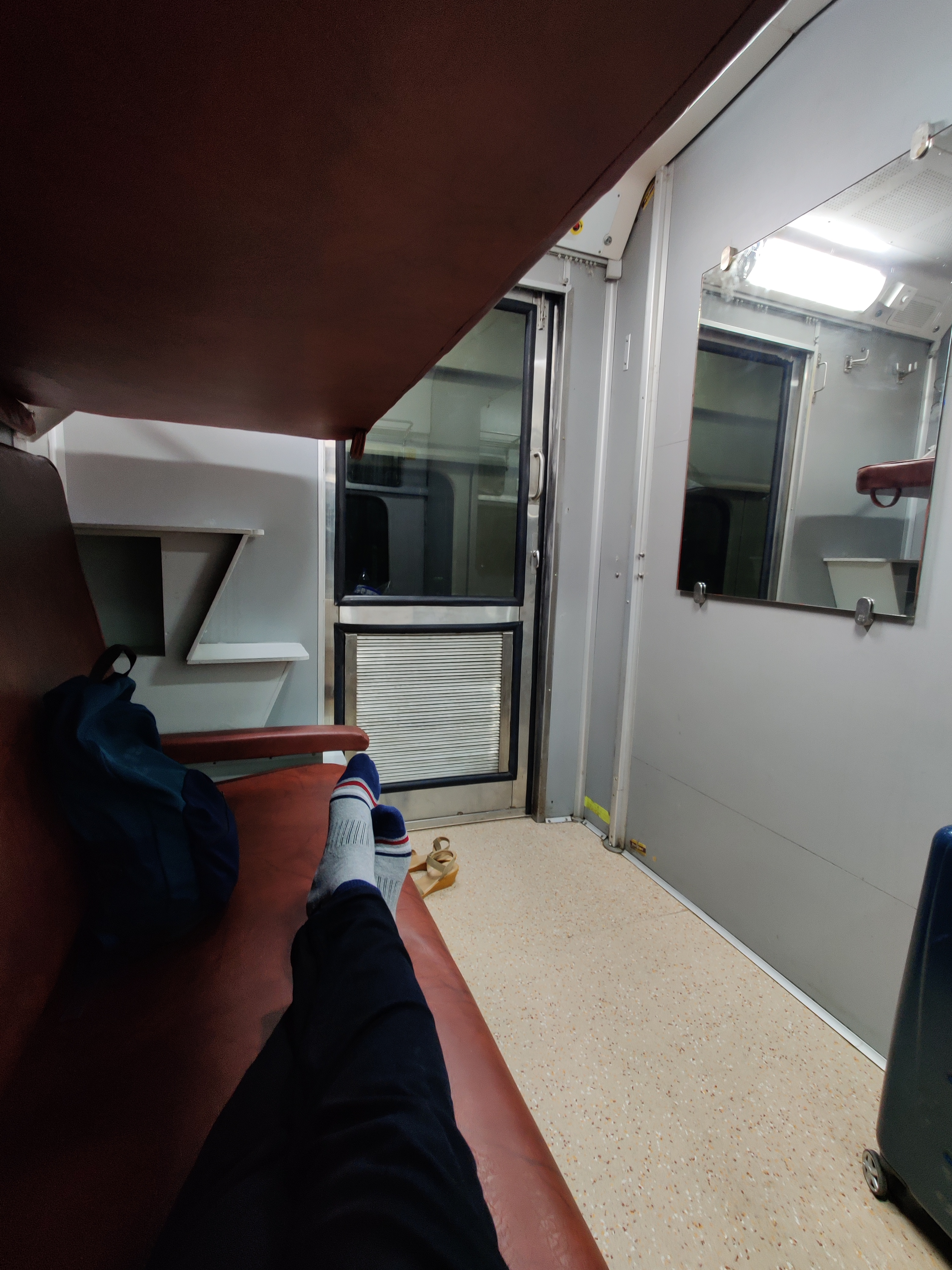
1A Coupe interior
