= Arun Bhimawad =

Indian politician

Member of the Madhya Pradesh Legislative Assembly
- Constituency: Shajapur

Personal details
- Born: 4 May 1969 (age 56) Shajapur, Madhya Pradesh, India
- Citizenship: India
- Party: Bhartiya Janata Party

Arun Bhimawad is an Indian politician belonging to Bharatiya Janata Party. He is the current MLA from Shajapur (Vidhan Sabha constituency) in Madhya Pradesh. He fought against the Indian National Congress veteran Hukum Singh Karada three times, and won in 2018 and 2023. In 2023 he won by a margin of just 28 votes.
