= Guna Junction railway station =

Railway station in Madhya Pradesh, India

Guna Junction
- Indian Railways logo

General information
- Location: Guna, Madhya Pradesh; India
- Coordinates: 24.6408°N 77.3142°E
- Elevation: 108 metres (354 ft)
- System: Indian Railways station
- Owner: Indian Railways
- Operator: West Central Railway
- Lines: Indore–Gwalior line, Kota-Bina line
- Platforms: 3
- Tracks: 4
- Connections: Auto stand

Construction
- Structure type: Standard (on-ground station)
- Parking: Yes
- Cycle facilities: No

Other information
- Status: Functioning
- Station code: GUNA
- Zone(s): West Central Railway
- Division(s): Bhopal
Location
- Location within India Location within Madhya Pradesh

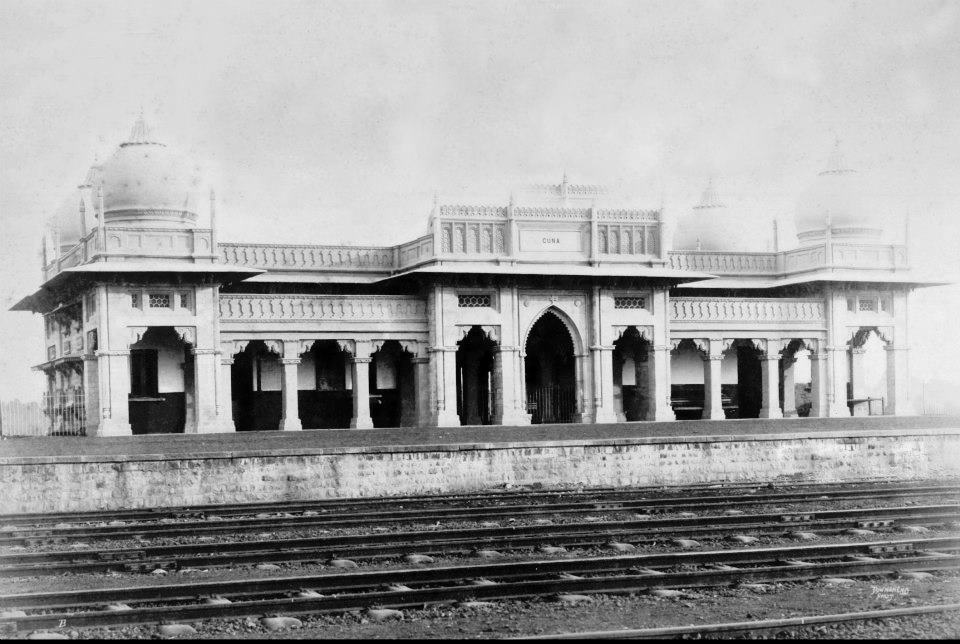
Guna Junction (1890)

Guna Junction railway station is a main railway station in Guna district, Madhya Pradesh. Its code is GUNA. It serves Guna city. The station consists of three platforms. The platforms are well sheltered. It has many facilities including water and sanitation.

Guna Junction is well connected to major parts of the state as well as country such as Delhi, Mumbai, Kota, Pune, Bhopal, Indore, Jabalpur, Gwalior, Chennai, Kolkata, Ajmer, Agra, Jaipur etc. It is one of the busiest and major stations in the state.

Guna is on the route from Indore to New Delhi and is located on the Mumbai-Agra National Highway.

== Major trains ==
- Bhagat Ki Kothi–Tambaram Humsafar Express
- Ujjaini Express
- Santragachi–Ajmer Weekly Express
- Khwaja Garib Nawaz Madar–Kolkata Express
- Bhagalpur–Ajmer Express
- Visakhapatnam–Bhagat Ki Kothi Express
- Sabarmati Express
- Pune–Gwalior Weekly Express
- Gorakhpur–Okha Express
- Jhansi–Bandra Terminus Express
- Surat–Muzaffarpur Express
- Ratlam–Gwalior Intercity Express
- Durg–Jaipur Weekly Express
- Indore–Dehradun Express
- Indore–Amritsar Express
- Indore–Chandigarh Express
- Dayodaya Express
- Bhopal–Gwalior Intercity Express
- Gwalior - SMVT Bengaluru Express
- Guna–Bina Passenger (unreserved)
