= Dehradun Jan Shatabdi Express =

Jan Shatabdi Express train in India

Dehradun - New Delhi Jan Shatabdi Express

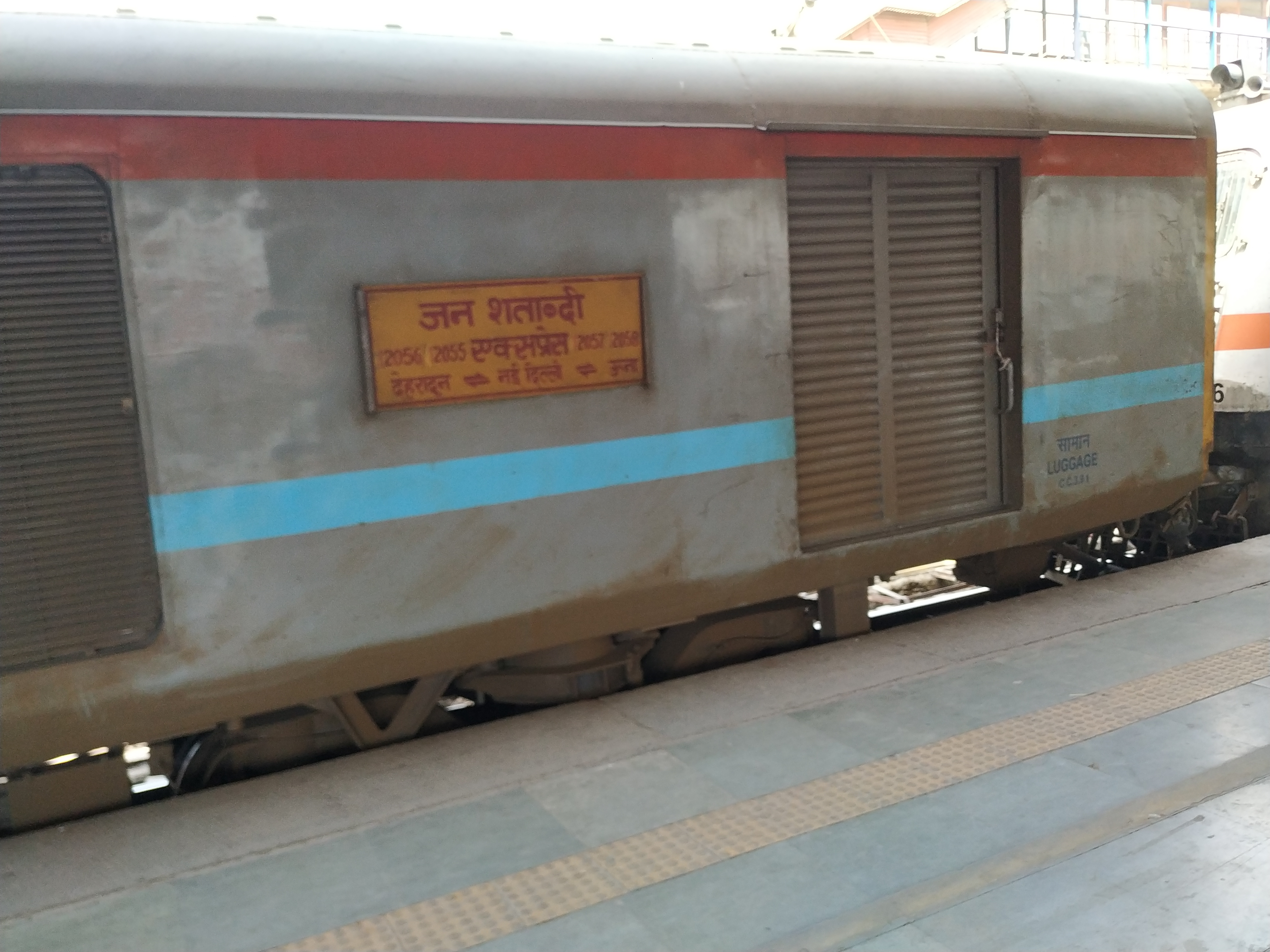
- 12056 Janshatabdi Express board.

Overview
- Service type: Superfast Express, Jan Shatabdi Express
- Locale: Delhi, Uttar Pradesh, Uttarakhand
- First service: 16 August 2002; 24 years ago
- Current operator: Northern Railways (NR)

Route
- Termini: Dehradun (DDN); New Delhi (NDLS)
- Stops: 9 as 12055 / 10 as 12056
- Distance travelled: 305 km (190 mi)
- Average journey time: 5 hours 50 minutes as 12055, 6 hours 15 minutes as 12056
- Service frequency: Daily service
- Train number: 12055 / 12056

On-board services
- Classes: AC Chair Car, 2nd Class seating
- Seating arrangements: Yes
- Sleeping arrangements: No
- Catering facilities: No pantry car but available
- Observation facilities: Rake sharing with 12057/12058 Una Jan Shatabdi Express
- Baggage facilities: Overhead racks

Technical
- Rolling stock: LHB coach
- Track gauge: 1,676 mm (5 ft 6 in)
- Electrification: 25 kV AC 50 Hz OHLE
- Operating speed: 110 km/h (68 mph) maximum, 52 km/h (32 mph) average including halts

The 12055/12056 Dehradun–New Delhi Jan Shatabdi Express is an Express belonging to Indian Railways that runs between Dehradun & New Delhi in India. It is a daily service. It operates as train number 12056 from Dehradun to New Delhi and as train number 12055 in the reverse direction.

== Coaches ==
It has 4 standard Jan Shatabdi Express AC Chair Car & 9 2nd Class Non - AC seating coaches with No general coach. As with most train services in India, coach composition may be amended at the discretion of Indian Railways depending on demand.

== Service ==
It is a daily train & covers the distance of 305 kilometres in 6 hours as 12056 Dehradun Jan Shatabdi Express (50.83 km/h) and 303 kilometres 5 hours 45 mins as 12055 New Delhi–Dehradun Jan Shatabdi Express (52.70 km/h).

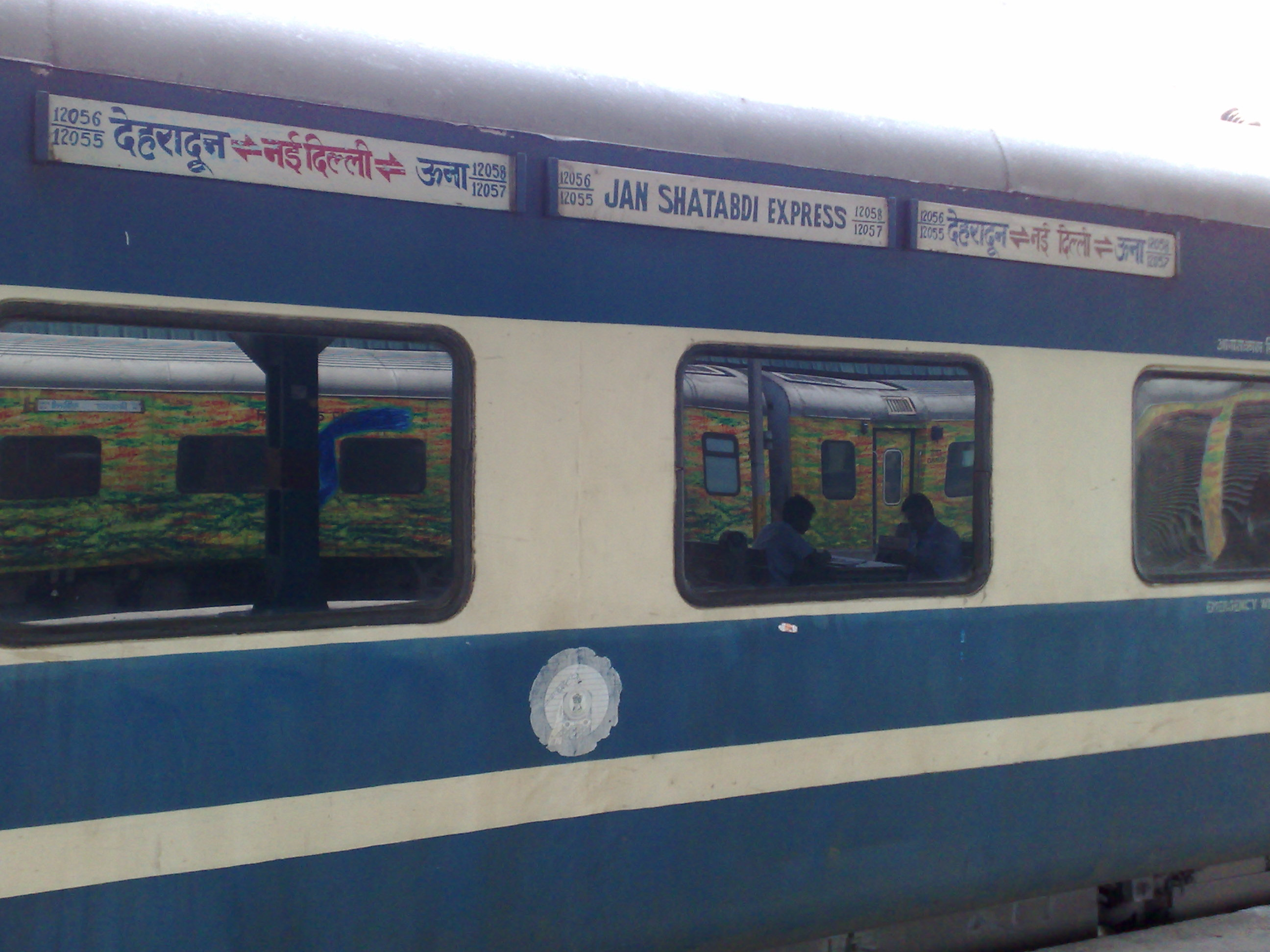
12055 Janshatabdi Express – AC Chair Car coach

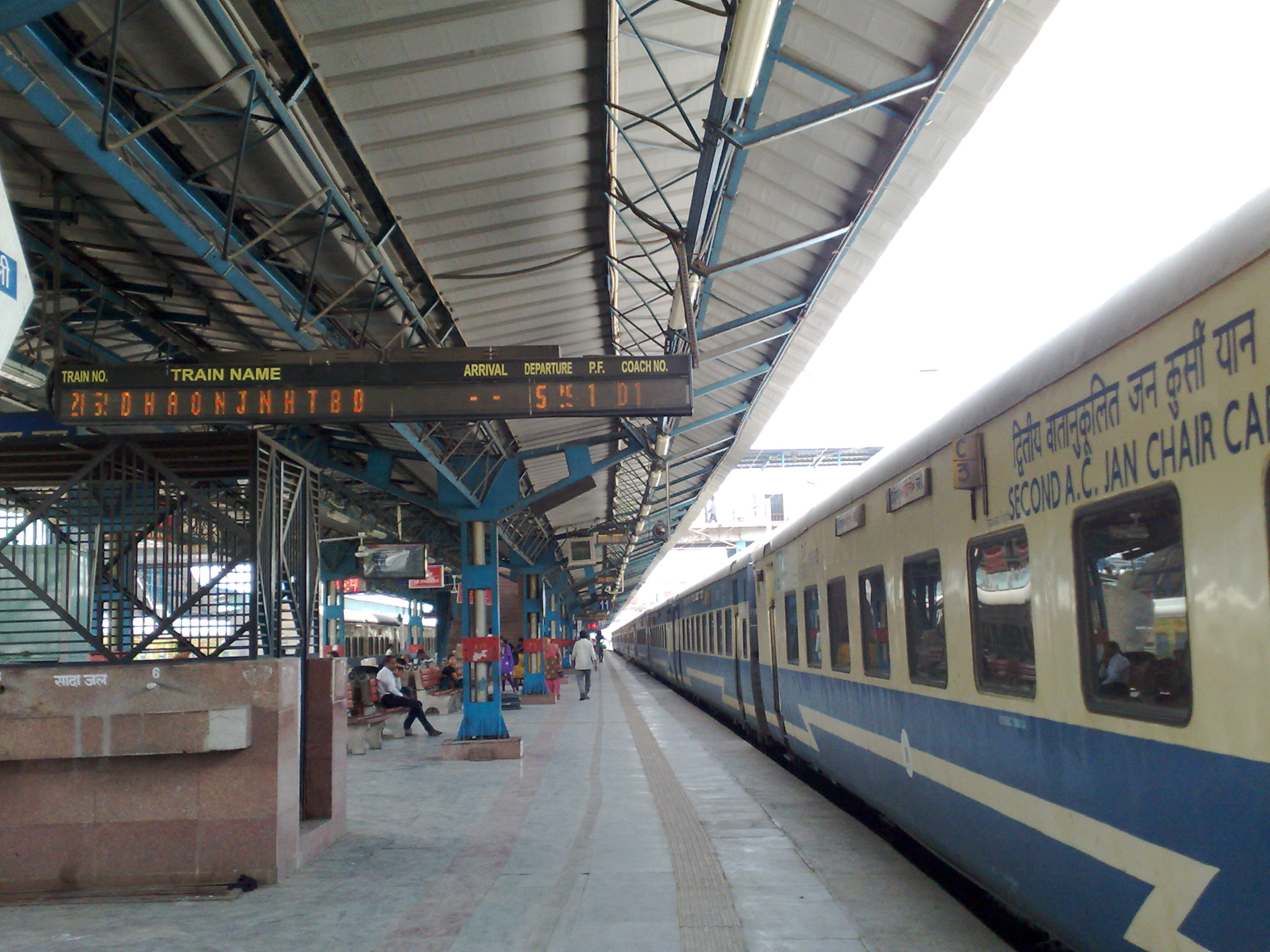
12055 Jan Shatabdi Express at New Delhi

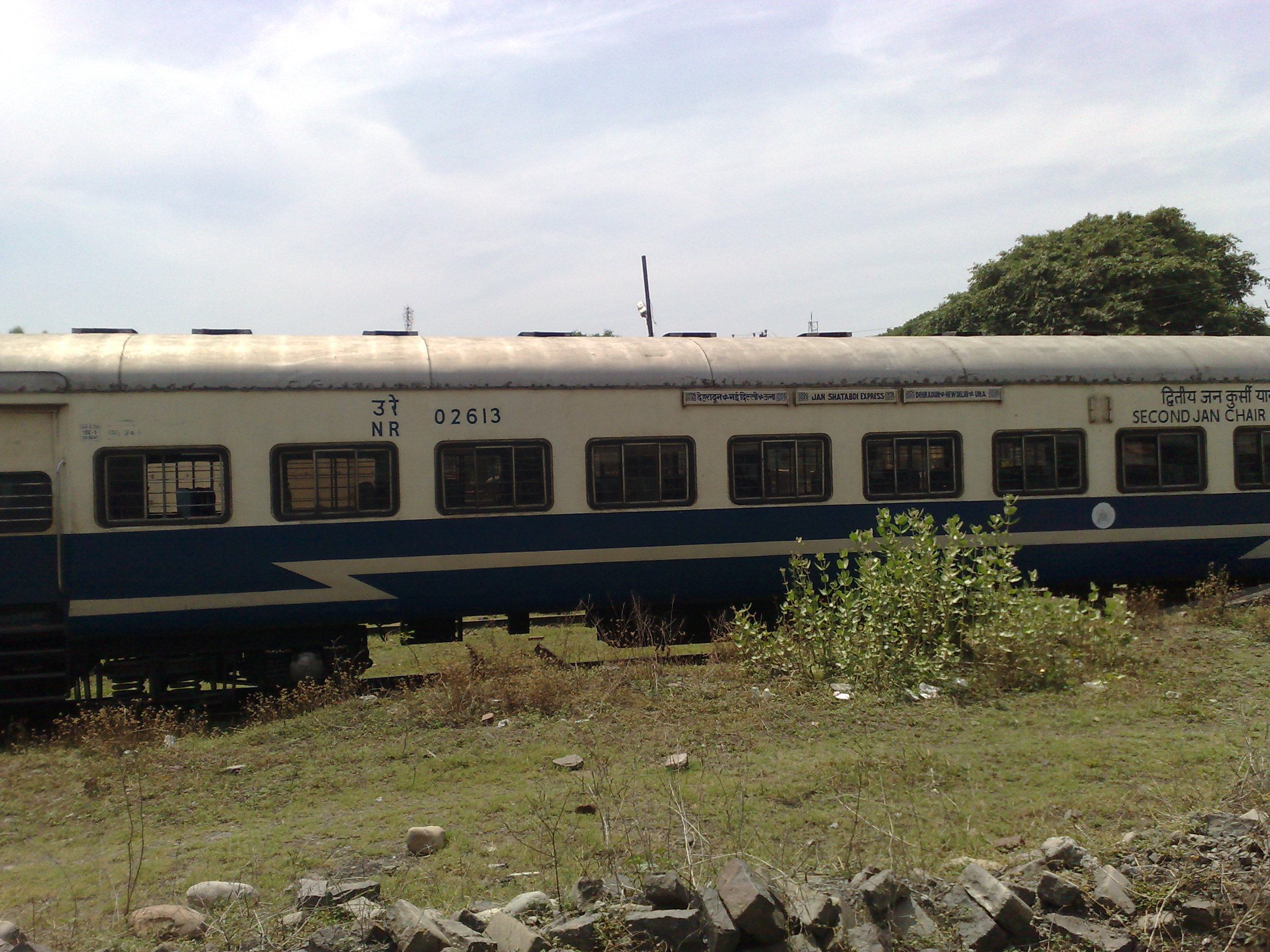
12055 Jan Shatabdi Express – Second Jan Chair Car

== Traction ==
It is hauled end to end by a WAP-5 / WAP-7 engine from the Ghaziabad electric loco shed. Earlier it used to be hauled by a WDM-3A / WDP-3A from Tughlakabad diesel loco shed.

== Timings ==
12055 New Delhi–Dehradun Jan Shatabdi Express leaves New Delhi every day and reaches Dehradun the same day.

12056 Dehradun–New Delhi Jan Shatabdi Express leaves Dehradun every day and reaches New Delhi the same day.

== Halts & schedule ==
=== 12055 ===
Station code	Departure station	Time (IST)	Distance (km)	Day
NDLS	New Delhi	3:20 PM	0 (Source)	Day 1
GZB	Ghaziabad Junction	4:00 PM	26	Day 1
MTC	Meerut City	4:41 PM	73	Day 1
MOZ	Muzaffarnagar	5:25 PM	129	Day 1
DBD	Deoband railway Station	5:43 PM	153	Day 1
TPZ	Tapri railway station	6:12 PM	180	Day 1
RK	Roorkee	6:45 PM	212	Day 1
HW	Haridwar Junction	7:33 PM	253	Day 1
DDN	Dehradun	9:10 PM	305 (Destination)	Day 1

=== 12056 ===
Station code	Departure station	Time (IST)	Distance (km)	Day
DDN	Dehradun	5:00 AM	0 (Source)	Day 1
HW	Haridwar Junction	6:33 AM	52	Day 1
RK	Roorkee	7:08 AM	93	Day 1
TPZ	Tapri railway station	7:54 AM	125	Day 1
DBD	Deoband railway Station	8:16 AM	153	Day 1
MOZ	Muzaffarnagar	8:36 AM	177	Day 1
MTC	Meerut City	9:35 AM	232	Day 1
GZB	Ghaziabad Junction	10:28 AM	280	Day 1
TKJ	Tilak Bridge	10:58 AM	303	Day 1
NDLS	New Delhi	11:15 AM	305 (Destination)	Day 1

== Routeing ==
The train runs from New Delhi via Ghaziabad, Meerut City, Haridwar Junction to Dehradun.
