= Shajapur Assembly constituency =

Constituency of the Madhya Pradesh legislative assembly in India

Coordinates: 23.42°N 76.28°E

Shajapur
- Constituency No. 167 for the Madhya Pradesh Legislative Assembly

Constituency details
- Country: India
- Region: Central India
- State: Madhya Pradesh
- District: Shajapur
- Lok Sabha constituency: Dewas
- Established: 1962
- Reservation: None

Member of Legislative Assembly
- 16th Madhya Pradesh Legislative Assembly
- Incumbent Arun Bhimawad
- Party: Bharatiya Janata Party
- Elected year: 2023
- Preceded by: Hukum Singh Karada

Shajapur Assembly constituency is one of the 230 Vidhan Sabha (Legislative Assembly) constituencies of Madhya Pradesh state in central India. It is a segment of Dewas (Lok Sabha constituency).

It is part of Shajapur district.

== Members of the Legislative Assembly ==
=== Madhya Bharat Legislative Assembly ===
Election	Name	Party
1952	Hari Laxman Masoorkar	Indian National Congress
1952	Kishanlal Nagaji	Indian National Congress

=== Madhya Pradesh Legislative Assembly ===
Election	Name	Party
1962	Ramesh Chandra	Bharatiya Jana Sangh
1972	Tara P Chandra Sharma	Indian National Congress
1977	Shashikant Shendurnaikar	Janata Party
1980	Tarrajyoti Sharma	Indian National Congress
1985	Purushottam Chandravanshi	Bharatiya Janta Party
1990	Laxmi Narain Patel	Bharatiya Janta Party
1993	Hukum Singh Karada	Indian National Congress
1998	Hukum Singh Karada	Indian National Congress
2003	Hukum Singh Karada	Indian National Congress
2008	Hukum Singh Karada	Indian National Congress
2013	Arun Bhimawad	Bharatiya Janata Party
2018	Hukum Singh Karada	Indian National Congress
2023	Arun Bhimawad	Bharatiya Janata Party

== Election results ==
=== 2023 ===
2023 Madhya Pradesh Legislative Assembly election: Shajapur
Party	Candidate	Votes	%	±%
BJP	Arun Bhimawad	98,960	47.33	+22.91
INC	Hukum Singh Karada	98,932	47.32	−1.53
ASP(KR)	Kantilal	5,689	2.72	
NOTA	None of the above	1,534	0.73	−0.4
Majority		28	0.01	−24.42
Turnout		209,087	85.63	+2.37
BJP gain from INC		Swing		

=== 2018 ===
2018 Madhya Pradesh Legislative Assembly election: Shajapur
Party	Candidate	Votes	%	±%
INC	Hukum Singh Karada	89,940	48.85	
BJP	Arun Bhimawad	44,961	24.42	
Independent	JP Mandloi	37,841	20.55	
BSP	Choukhutiya Rajendrasingh	4,150	2.25	
NOTA	None of the above	2,072	1.13	
Majority		44,979	24.43	
Turnout		184,125	83.26	
INC gain from BJP		Swing		

=== 1962 ===
- Ramesh Chandra (JS) : 17,418 votes
- Pratap Bhai (INC) : 14,163

== See also ==
- Shajapur
