= Daund–Gwalior Weekly Superfast Express =

Train in India

Overview
- Service type: Express
- First service: 3 March 2014; 12 years ago
- Current operator: North Central Railway

Route
- Termini: Daund (DD); Gwalior (GWL)
- Stops: 22
- Distance travelled: 1,444 km (897 mi)
- Average journey time: 25 hours 45 minutes
- Service frequency: Weekly (Note: Runs one days in a week for every direction.)
- Train number: 22193 / 22194

On-board services
- Classes: AC 2 tier, AC 3 tier, Sleeper class, General Unreserved
- Seating arrangements: Yes
- Sleeping arrangements: Yes
- Catering facilities: E-catering, On-board catering
- Observation facilities: Large windows
- Baggage facilities: Available
- Other facilities: Below the seats

Technical
- Rolling stock: LHB coach
- Track gauge: 1,676 mm (5 ft 6 in)
- Operating speed: 56 km/h (35 mph) average including halts.
- Rake sharing: Rake sharing with 22199/22200 Sushasan Express

The 22193 / 22194 Daund–Gwalior Weekly Superfast Express is a superfast Express train of the Indian Railways connecting Daund Junction in Maharashtra and Gwalior Junction of Madhya Pradesh. It is currently being operated with 22193/22194 train numbers on a daily basis.

== Service ==
11101/Pune–Gwalior Weekly Express has an average speed of 51 km/h and covers 1368 km in 26 hrs 45 mins.

11102/Gwalior–Pune Weekly Express has an average speed of 47 km/h and covers 1368 km in 29 hrs 05 mins.

== Route & halts ==
The important halts of the train are:

- Daund Junction
- Pune Junction
- Chinchwad
- Lonavala
- Panvel
- Vasai Road
- Boisar
- Vapi
- Valsad
- Surat
- Bharuch Junction
- Vadodara Junction
- Godhra Junction
- Dahod
- Ratlam Junction
- Nagda Junction
- Ujjain Junction
- Maksi Junction
- Shajapur
- Biyavra Rajgarh
- Ruthiyai Junction
- Guna Junction
- Shivpuri
- Gwalior Junction

== Coach composition ==
The train consists of 18 coaches:

- 1 AC II Tier
- 2 AC III Tier
- 6 Sleeper coaches
- 7 General Unreserved
- 2 Seating cum Luggage Rake

== Traction ==
Both trains are hauled by a Kanpur Loco Shed-based WAP-7 electric locomotive from Daund to Gwalior and vice versa.
