= Bhagat Ki Kothi–Thiruchchirappalli Humsafar Express =

Train in India

Bhagat Ki Kothi – Thiruchchirappalli Humsafar Express
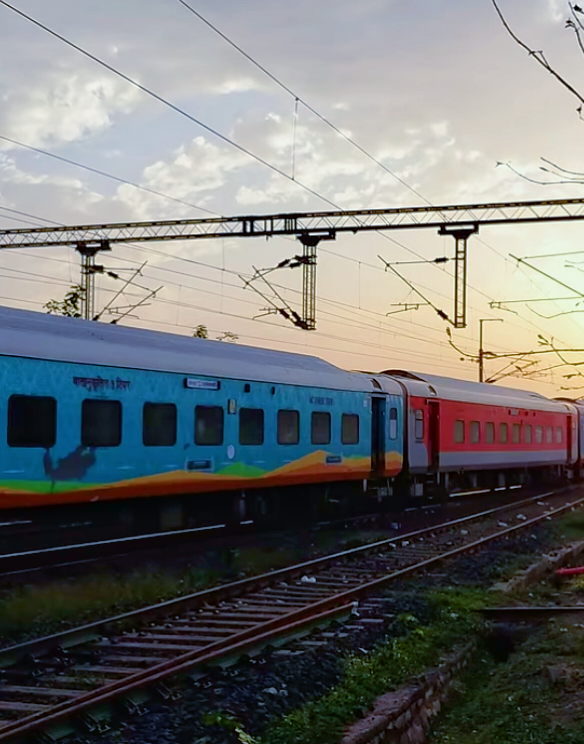
- TPJ–BGKT Humsafar Express At Itarsi Junction

Overview
- Service type: Humsafar Express
- Status: 14 May 2018; 8 years ago
- Current operator: North Western Railways

Route
- Termini: Bhagat Ki Kothi (BGKT); Tiruchirappalli (TPJ)
- Stops: 22
- Distance travelled: 2,816 km (1,750 mi)
- Average journey time: 47 hours 50 minutes
- Service frequency: Weekly (Note: Runs once in a week for every direction.)
- Train number: 20481 / 20482

On-board services
- Classes: AC 3 Tier, Sleeper class
- Seating arrangements: No
- Sleeping arrangements: Yes
- Catering facilities: No pantry car available
- Observation facilities: Large windows

Technical
- Rolling stock: LHB Humsafar
- Track gauge: 1,676 mm (5 ft 6 in)
- Operating speed: Avg. Speed 59 km/h
Route map
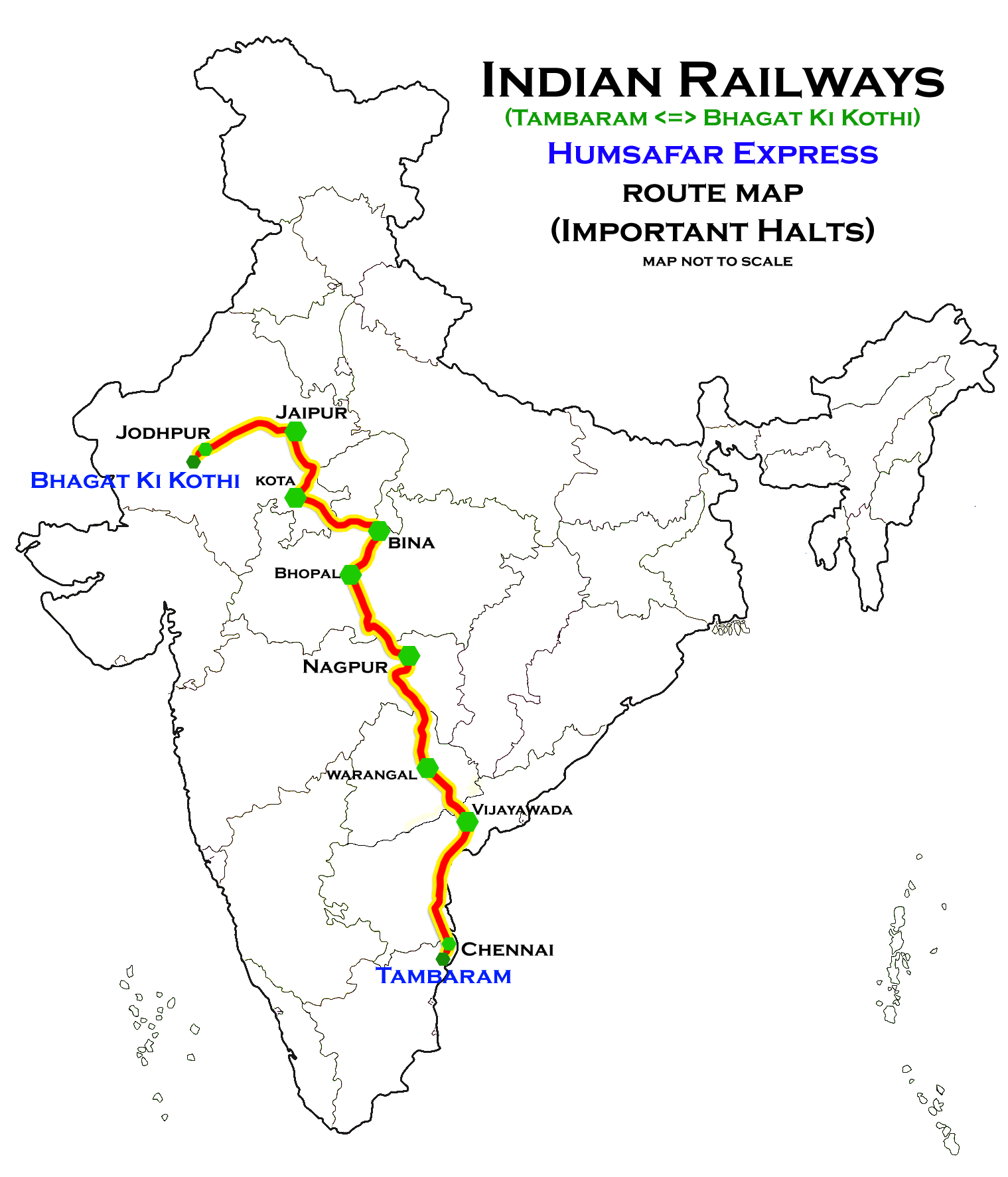

The 20481/20482 Bhagat Ki Kothi–Thiruchirappalli Humsafar Express is a Superfast Express train belonging to North Western Railway zone that runs between Bhagat Ki Kothi and Tiruchirappalli Junction. It was announced to be operated with 14815/14816 train numbers on a weekly basis. Initially it was introduced as Tambaram–Bhagat Ki Kothi Humsafar AC Express. After July 21, 2021, it was upgraded as Superfast Express and it was extended to Tiruchirappalli Junction and will run as Bhagat Ki Kothi–Tiruchirappalli Junction Humsafar AC Superfast Express with new timings from Tiruchirappalli Junction to Bhagat Ki Kothi. And the timings between Bhagat Ki Kothi–Tambaram remains unchanged.

== Coach composition ==
The 14815/6 Bhagat Ki Kothi–Tiruchirappalli Junction–Bhagat Ki Kothi Humsafar Superfast Express has

- 16 AC Three Tier coaches
- 1 Sleeper class
- 2 End-On Generator cars
- 1 Pantry Car

== History and service ==
During its initial days it ran as Bhagat Ki Kothi–Tambaram–Bhagat Ki Kothi Humsafar Express. 14815 departs Bhagat Ki Kothi at 15:20 on every Wednesday and reaches Tambaram at 10:45 on every Friday.

In the opposite direction 14816 leaves Tambaram at 19:15 on every Friday and reaches Bhagat Ki Kothi at 19:00 on every Sunday.

But after 21 July 2021 it was upgraded as a Superfast Express and was extended to Tiruchirappalli Junction and runs as Bhagat Ki Kothi–Tiruchirappalli Junction–Bhagat Ki Kothi Humsafar Superfast Express with same train number, but 14816 timings and days were changed since it was extended to Tiruchirappalli. So accordingly, 14815 Bhagat Ki Kothi–Tiruchirappalli Junction Humsafar Superfast Express is scheduled to leave Bhagat Ki Kothi at 16:10 on Wednesdays and reaches Tiruchirappalli Junction at 16:05 on Fridays. The 14816 Tiruchirappalli Junction–Bhagat Ki Kothi Humsafar Superfast Express leaves Tiruchirappalli Junction at 07:30 on Saturdays and reaches the Bhagat Ki Kothi at 07:45 on Mondays.

== Route and halts ==
1. Bhagat Ki Kothi
2. Jodhpur Junction
3. Jaipur Junction
4. Sawai Madhopur Junction (Reversal)
5. Kota Junction
6. Guna Junction
7. Ashoknagar
8. Bina Junction
9. Bhopal Junction
10. Itarsi Junction
11. Nagpur Junction
12. Balharshah Junction
13. Warangal
14. Vijayawada Junction
15. Nellore
16. Gudur Junction
17. Sullurpeta
18. Chennai Egmore
19. Tambaram
20. Chengalpattu Junction
21. Viluppuram Junction
22. Ariyalur
23. Tiruchirappalli Junction

== Traction ==
It is hauled by Royapuram Loco Shed-based WAP-7 electric locomotive from Bhagat Ki Kothi to Tiruchirappalli Junction and vice-versa.

== Schedule ==
Train number	Station code	Departure station	Departure time	Departure day	Arrival station code	Arrival station name	Arrival time	Arrival day
14815	BGKT	Bhagat Ki Kothi	04:10 PM	Wednesday	TPJ	Tiruchirappalli Junction	04:00 PM	Friday
14816	TPJ	Tiruchirappalli Junction	07:30 AM	Saturday	BGKT	Bhagat Ki Kothi	07:45 AM	Monday

== Direction reversals ==
The 14815/16 Bhagat Ki Kothi–Tiruchirappalli Junction–Bhagat Ki Kothi Humsafar AC Superfast Express reverses twice, at Sawai Madhopur Junction and Kota Junction.

== See also ==
- Humsafar Express
