= Sushasan Express =

Train in India

Overview
- Service type: Express
- First service: 25 December 2014; 11 years ago
- Current operator: North Central Railway

Route
- Termini: Gwalior Junction (GWL); Balrampur (BLP)
- Stops: 10
- Distance travelled: 953 km (592 mi)
- Average journey time: 16 hours 05 minutes
- Service frequency: Weekly (Note: Runs one days in a week for every direction.)
- Train number: 22199 / 22200

On-board services
- Classes: AC 2 tier, AC 3 tier, Sleeper class, General unreserved
- Seating arrangements: Yes
- Sleeping arrangements: Yes
- Catering facilities: On-board catering, E-catering
- Observation facilities: Large windows
- Baggage facilities: Available
- Other facilities: Below the seats

Technical
- Rolling stock: LHB coach
- Track gauge: 5 ft 6 in (1,676 mm); Broad Gauge
- Operating speed: 59 km/h (37 mph) average including halts.
- Rake sharing: Rake sharing with 22193/22914 Daund–Gwalior Weekly Superfast Express

The 22199 / 22200 Sushasan Express an Indian Railways train service launched to mark former Prime Minister Atal Bihari Vajpayee's 91st birthday, commenced operations on 25 December 2014. The train runs from Gwalior, the birthplace of Vajpayee, to Gonda, the workplace of Vajpayee via Hazrat Nizamuddin and Lucknow. On 11 November 2015 the extended to Balrampur, where Vajpayee was elected for the first time to the Lok Sabha. It shares its rake with Gwalior–Daund Weekly Express.

== History ==
The Express sported a special number, 01111, on its maiden run. Narendra Singh Tomar, Minister for Steel and Mines and the MP from Gwalior, cleared the train to depart Gwalior from platform #4 at 1:20 pm, 10 minutes behind schedule. According to senior railway officials, regular operation of the Sushasan Express (11111/11112) started on 31 December 2014 from Gwalior, and on 1 January 2015 from Gonda.

== Service ==
The Up train, Gwalior to Balrampur, has train number "22199". The Down train, Balrampur to Gwalior, has train number "22200". The weekly train leaves Gwalior on Wednesday, and departs Gonda in order to return to Gwalior on Thursday.

== Coach composition ==
Earlier the train used to run with a conventional ICF rake consisting of 17 coaches :

- 1 AC II Tier
- 2 AC III Tier
- 6 Sleeper coaches
- 6 General
- 2 Second-class Luggage/parcel van

From 18 September 2019, the conventional ICF rake was replaced by the LHB rake. The present LHB rake comprises 14 coaches -

- 1 AC II Tier
- 2 AC III Tier
- 6 Sleeper coaches
- 3 General
- 2 End-on-generators

== Route & halts ==
The important halts of the train are:

- Gwalior Junction
- Morena
- Agra Cantonment
- Mathura Junction
- Faridabad
- Hazrat Nizamuddin
- Ghaziabad Junction
- Moradabad Junction
- Bareilly Junction
- Lucknow Charbagh
- Gonda Junction
- Balrampur

== Traction ==
Both trains are hauled by a Kanpur Loco Shed-based WAP-7 electric locomotive from Gwalior to Balrampur and vice versa.

== Rake sharing ==
The train shares its rake with Pune–Gwalior Weekly Express

== See also ==
- Pune–Gwalior Weekly Express
- Chambal Express
