= Indore–Dehradun Express =

Train in India

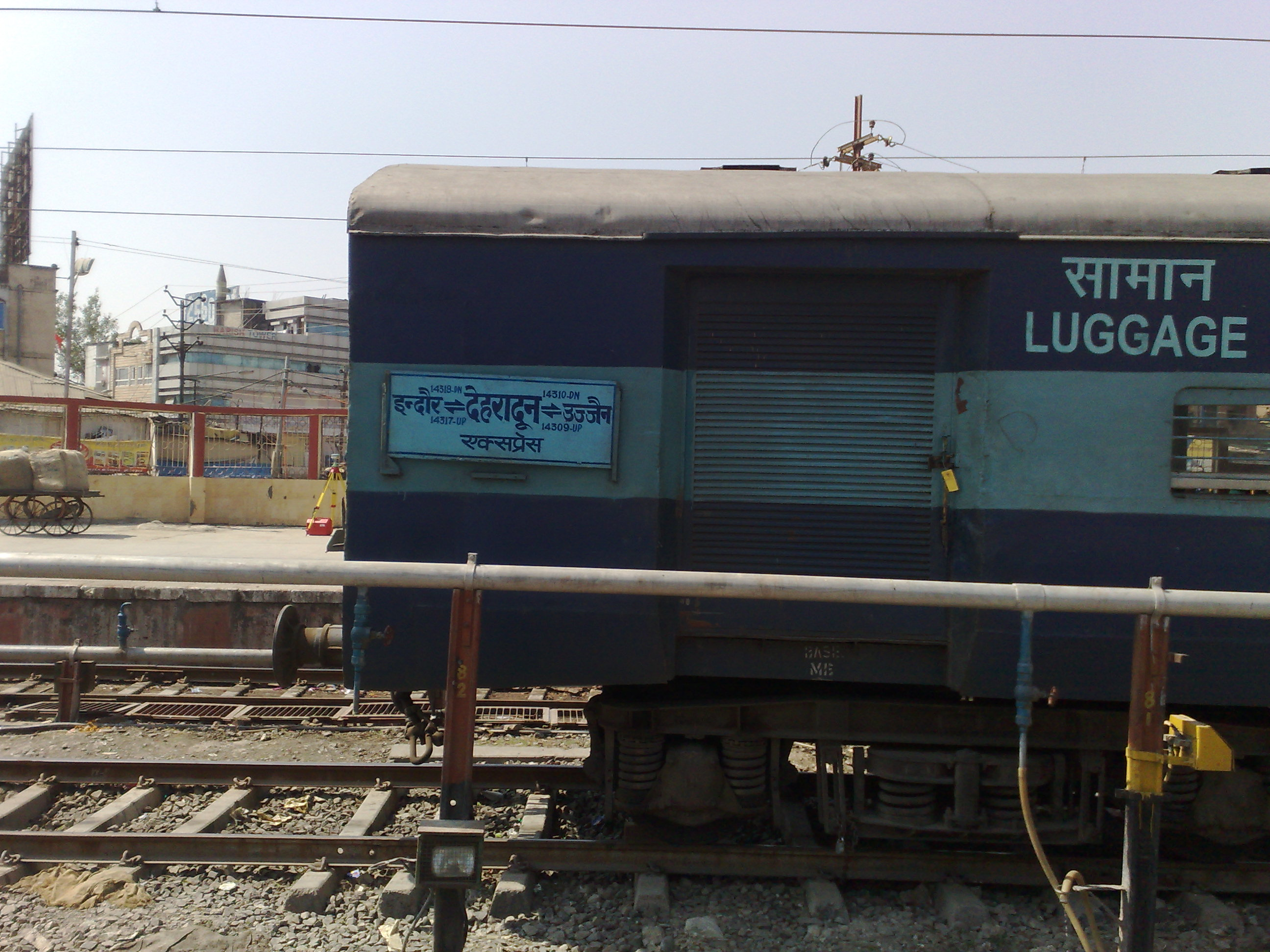

Overview
- Service type: Express
- Locale: Madhya Pradesh, Rajasthan, Uttar Pradesh, Haryana, Uttarakhand
- Current operator: Northern Railways

Route
- Termini: Indore Junction (INDB); Dehradun (DDN)
- Stops: 27
- Distance travelled: 1,180 km (730 mi)
- Average journey time: 25 hrs 5 mins
- Service frequency: Bi-weekly
- Train number: 14317/14318

On-board services
- Classes: AC 2 Tier, AC 3 Tier, Sleeper class, General Unreserved
- Seating arrangements: Yes
- Sleeping arrangements: Yes
- Catering facilities: On-board catering E-catering

Technical
- Track gauge: 1,676 mm (5 ft 6 in)
- Operating speed: Average speed: 47 km/h (29 mph) Maximum speed: 110 km/h (68 mph)

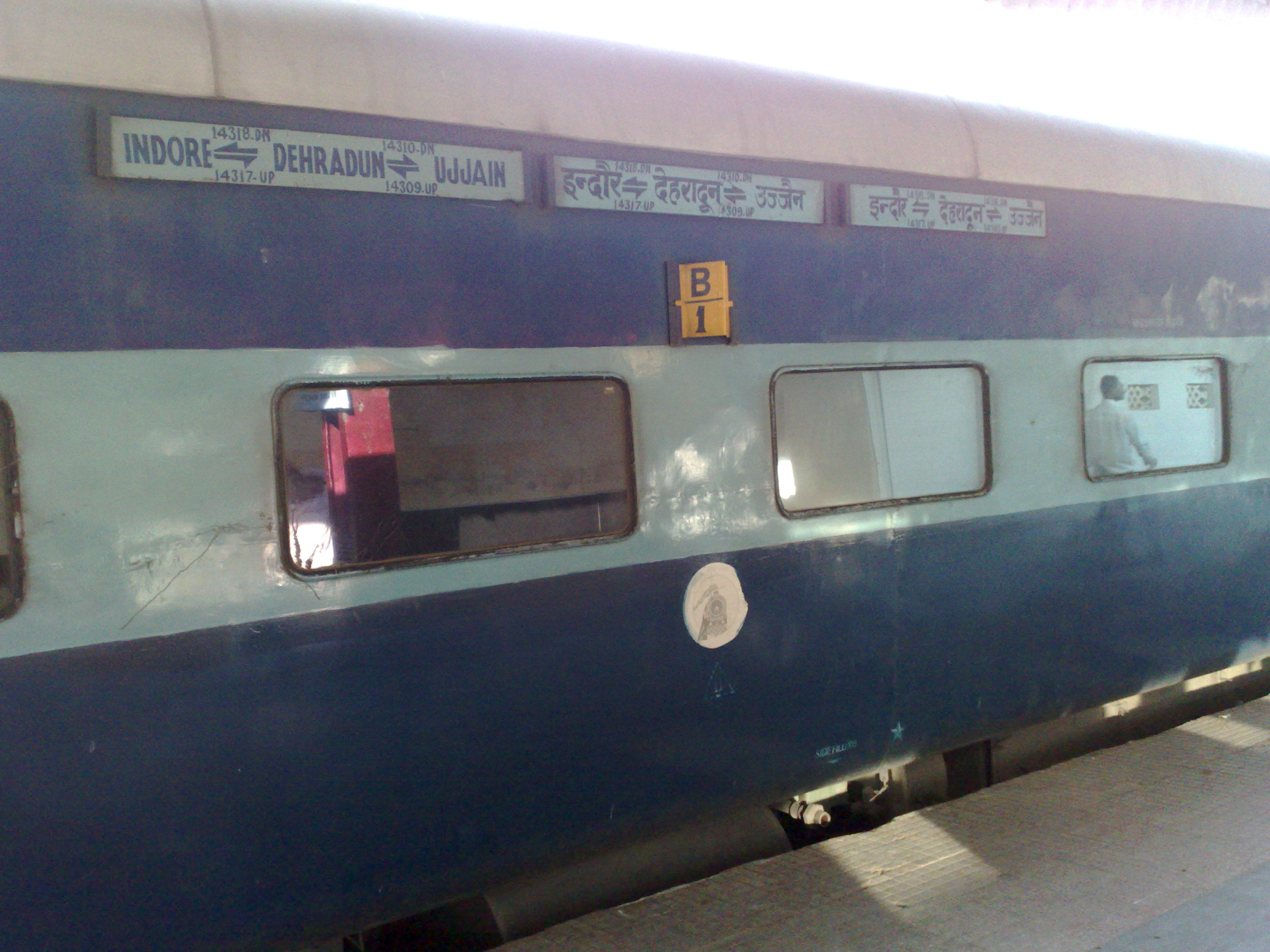
14317 Indore–Dehradun Express

The 14317/14318 Indore–Dehradun Express is a bi-weekly train service, which runs between Indore, the largest city and commercial capital of Madhya Pradesh and Dehradun, the capital city of Uttarakhand in India.

== Coach composition ==
The train operates with a standard LHB rake and consists of 15 coaches:

- 1 AC II Tier
- 3 AC III Tier
- 7 Sleeper Coaches
- 3 General
- 1 Second-class Luggage/parcel van

== Service ==
- 14317/ Indore–Dehradun Express has an average speed of 41 km/h and covers 1180 km in 28 hrs 40 mins.
- 14318/ Dehradun–Indore Express has an average speed of 47 km/h and covers 1180 km in 25 hrs 00 mins.

== Route and halts ==
The train halts at 27 stations including Indore and Dehradun, which are:

- Indore Junction
- Dewas Junction
- Ujjain Junction
- Maksi Junction
- Shajapur
- Pachor Road
- Biyavra Rajgarh
- Chachaura Binaganj
- Ruthiyai Junction
- Guna Junction
- Shivpuri
- Gwalior Junction
- Morena
- Dholpur Junction
- Agra Cantonment
- Mathura Junction
- Faridabad
- Hazrat Nizamuddin
- Ghaziabad Junction
- Modinagar
- Meerut City Junction
- Muzaffarnagar
- Saharanpur Junction
- Deoband
- Roorkee
- Haridwar
- Dehradun

== Schedule ==
Train number	Station code	Departure station	Departure time	Departure day	Arrival station	Arrival time	Arrival day
14317	INDB	Indore Junction	15:00 PM	Sun, Sat	Dehradun	19:40 PM	Sun, Mon
14318	DDN	Dehradun	05:50 AM	Fri, Sat	Indore Junction	06:50 AM	Sun, Sat

== Rake sharing ==
The train shares its rake with 14309/14310 Ujjaini Express.

== Direction reversal ==
Train reverses its direction 2 times at:

- Ujjain Junction
- Saharanpur Junction

== Traction ==
Both trains are hauled by a Diesel Loco Shed, Tughlakabad-based WDM-3A or WDP-4D or WDP-4B diesel locomotive.

== See also ==
- Ujjaini Express
