= Ujjaini Express =

Train in India

Overview
- Service type: Express
- Locale: Madhya Pradesh, Rajasthan, Uttar Pradesh, Delhi & Uttarakhand
- First service: January 1, 1991; 34 years ago
- Current operator(s): Northern Railway

Route
- Termini: Yog Nagari Rishikesh (YNRK); Laxmibai Nagar (LMNR)
- Stops: 25
- Distance travelled: 1,147 km (713 mi)
- Average journey time: 27 hours 20 minutes
- Service frequency: Bi-weekly (Note: Runs two days in a week for every direction)
- Train number(s): 14309 / 14310

On-board services
- Class(es): AC 2 Tier, AC 3 Tier, Sleeper Class, General Unreserved
- Seating arrangements: Yes
- Sleeping arrangements: Yes
- Catering facilities: On-board Catering, E-Catering
- Observation facilities: Large windows
- Baggage facilities: Available
- Other facilities: Below the seats

Technical
- Rolling stock: LHB Coaches
- Track gauge: Broad Gauge
- Operating speed: 42 km/h (26 mph) average including halts

The 14309 / 14310 Ujjaini Express is a bi-weekly train service, connecting Lakshmibai Nagar, a satellite station of Indore, the Commercial Capital of Madhya Pradesh, Ujjain railway station of the Hindu mythological and historical city of Ujjain in the Central Indian state Madhya Pradesh with Yog Nagari Rishikesh railway station.

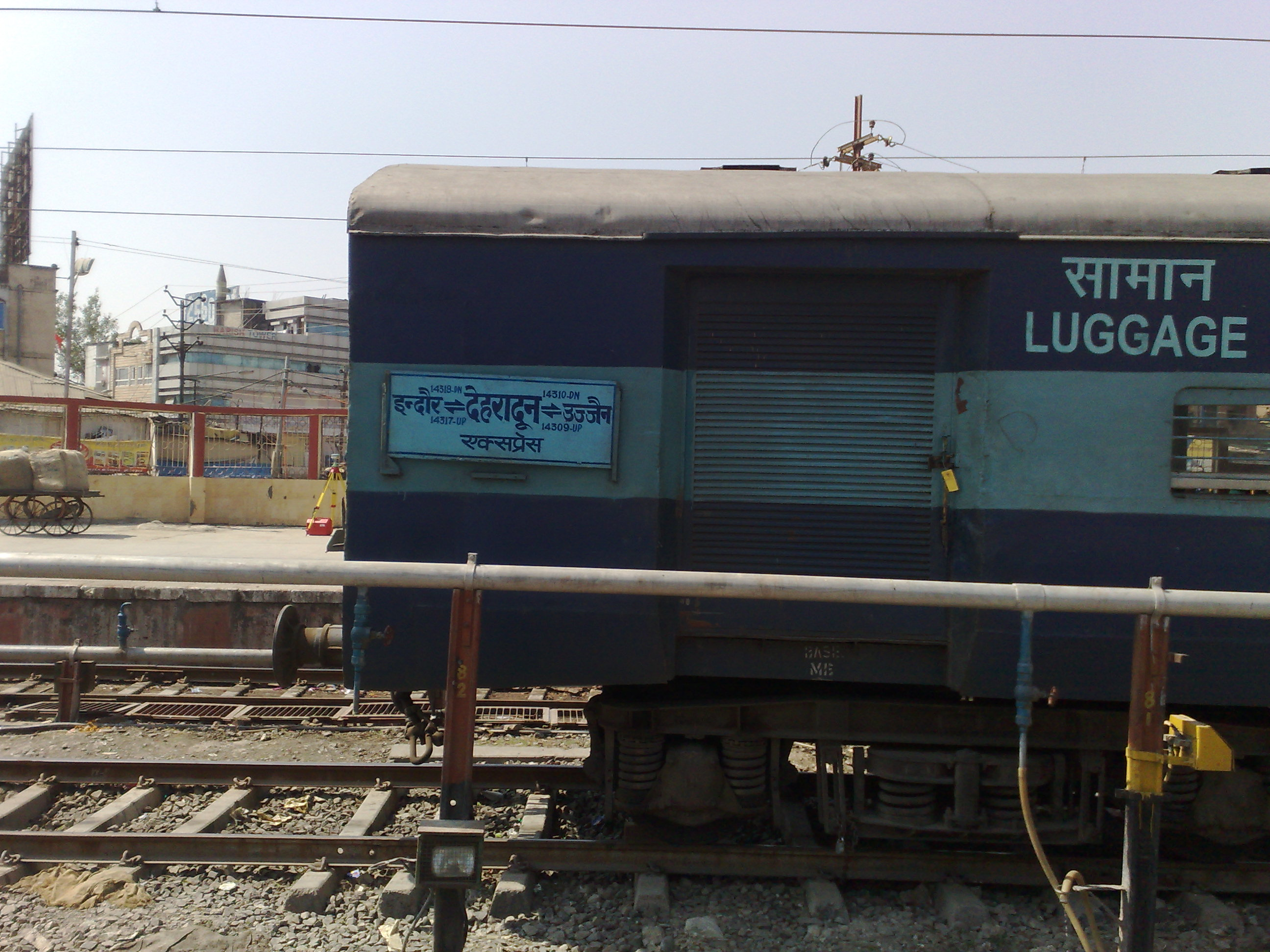
Indore/Ujjain Dehradun Express trainboard

The name Ujjaini is the older known name for Ujjain, Madhya Pradesh, It is one of the two trains whose name is based upon Ujjain's older known name, the other one being Avantika Superfast Express connecting Mumbai with Indore.

The numbers provided for this train are 14309 from Lakshmibai Nagar to Rishikesh and 14310 from Rishikesh to Lakshmibai Nagar. This service is the only express train service originating from Laxmibai Nagar railway station. The train runs on bi-weekly basis sharing rakes of Laxmi Bai Nagar - Yog Nagri Rishikesh Express.

It used to run from Ujjain Junction railway station, but after the restart due to the COVID-19 outbreak, it was changed to Laxmibai Nagar railway station.

Earlier, this train used to originate/terminate at Dehradun railway station, but on 3 January 2023, the origination/termination of 14309/14310/14317/14318 was changed to Yog Nagari Rishikesh railway station.

== Service ==
The 14309/Ujjaini Express has an average speed of 42 km/h and covers 1147 km in 27 hrs 20 mins. 14310/Ujjaini Express has an average speed of 48 km/h and covers the distance in 23 hrs 50 mins.

== Route and halts ==
The train has standard LHB rakes with max speed of 130 kmph. The train halts at 26/27 stations, some of the important ones are:

- Lakshmibai Nagar
- Ujjain Junction
- Biyavra Rajgarh
- Guna Junction
- Gwalior Junction
- Agra Cantonment
- Mathura Junction
- Hazrat Nizamuddin
- Ghaziabad Junction
- Meerut City Junction
- Haridwar
- Yog Nagari Rishikesh railway station

== Coach composition ==
The train operates with a standard LHB rake and consists of 15 coaches:

- 1 AC II Tier
- 3 AC III Tier
- 7 Sleeper Coaches
- 3 General
- 1 Second-class Luggage/parcel van

== Traction ==
Both trains are hauled by a Ghaziabad loco shed based WAP 7 diesel locomotive from Laxmibai Nagar railway station to Yog Nagari Rishikesh railway station and vice versa.

== Direction reversal ==
Train Reverses its direction only at:

- Ujjain Junction
- Saharanpur Junction

== Rake sharing ==
The train shares its rake with 14317/14318 Indore - Dehradun Express

== See also ==
- Ujjain
- Ujjain Junction
- Indore - Dehradun Express
- Indore
- Dehradun
