= Madhya Pradesh I =

Indian power utility

- Country: India
- Location: Surajpur Village, Shajapur District, Madhya Pradesh
- Coordinates: 23°13′38″N 76°12′55″E
- Status: under construction
- Commission date: expteced for Q3, 2023
- Owner: Talettutayi Solar Projects Nine Private Limited

Solar farm
- Type: Standard PV
- Total collector area: 640 acres

Power generation
- Nameplate capacity: 200 MW_{DC}

The Madhya Pradesh I solar park near Surajpur Village in the Shajapur district of Madhya Pradesh is a 200 megawatt (MWD_{C}) photovoltaic power station, which is under construction. It was formerly known as solar park Northwest India I.

Location of Power Plant Madhya Pradesh I in the State of Madhya Pradesh

It covers an area of 640 acres (260 hectares) and supplies about 256.000 people with energy. It is under construction as a fixed tilt mounting structure, using mono PERC solar PV technology. The power plant will be connected to a 400 kV PGCIL Pachora substation. The produced electricity will be taken by 1. M.P. Power Management Company Limited (MPPMCL) and Indian Railways (IR).

India has a target of developing 22,000 MW (75 billion Btu/h) of solar power plants and an additional 8,000 MW (27 billion Btu/h) is expected in local generation, bringing the total to 30,000 MW (100 billion Btu/h) by 2022, which was later increased to 100,000 megawatts.
