= Madurai–Chandigarh Express =

Train in India

Madurai-Chandigarh Superfast Express
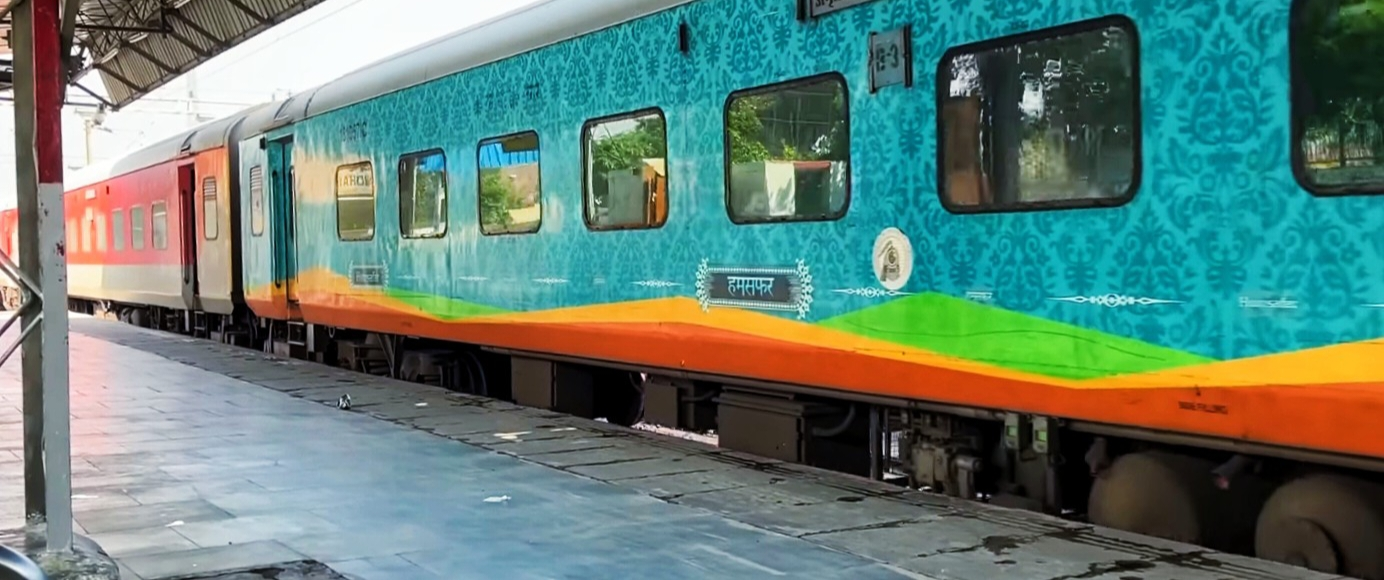
- Madurai-Chandigarh Superfast Express At Mathura Junction railway station

Overview
- Service type: Superfast
- First service: 30 October 2003; 22 years ago
- Current operator: Northern Railway
- Former operator: Southern Railway

Route
- Termini: Madurai (MDU); Chandigarh (CDG)
- Stops: 29
- Distance travelled: 3,075 km (1,911 mi)
- Average journey time: 51 hrs 50 mins
- Service frequency: Bi-weekly.
- Train number: 20493 / 20494

On-board services
- Classes: AC 2 Tier, AC 3 Tier, AC 3 Tier Economy, Sleeper Class, General Unreserved
- Seating arrangements: Yes
- Sleeping arrangements: Yes
- Catering facilities: Available
- Observation facilities: Large windows
- Baggage facilities: Available
- Other facilities: Below the seats

Technical
- Rolling stock: LHB coach
- Track gauge: 1,676 mm (5 ft 6 in)
- Operating speed: 130 km/h (81 mph) maximum, 60 km/h (37 mph) average including halts.
Route map
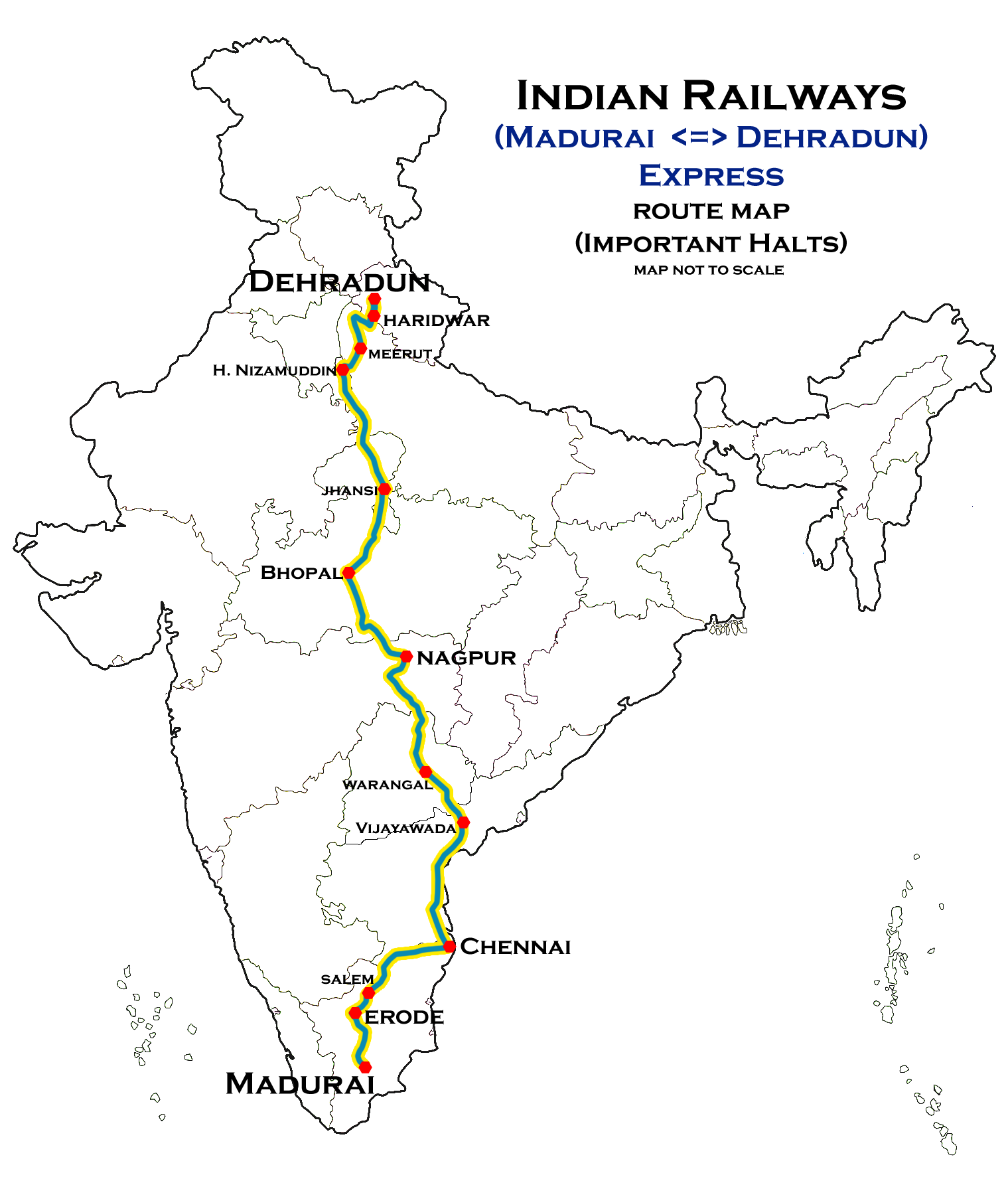

The 20493 / 20494 Madurai–Chandigarh Superfast Express is a Superfast Express train of Indian Railways – Northern Railway zone that runs between Madurai Junction in Tamil Nadu and Chandigarh Junction in Punjab and Haryana, India. The slip coaches to Dehradun was permanently discontinued with effect from 11 July 2021.

It operates as train number 20493 from Madurai Junction to Chandigarh Junction and as train number 20494 in the reverse direction, serving the states of Tamil Nadu, Andhra Pradesh, Telangana, Maharashtra, Madhya Pradesh, Delhi, Uttar Pradesh, Haryana and Punjab.

It previously ran only up to Chennai Central being recently extended to Madurai Junction. It carried slip coaches to Dehradun. But after July 11 2021, the slip coaches to Dehradun was permanently discontinued and it runs as a single train to Chandigarh from Madurai Junction, with revised coach position.

The train then changed its number from 12687/12688 to 20493/20494 in September 2024.

== History ==
It was first introduced as a Bi-Weekly Superfast Express between Chennai Central to Chandigarh and slip coaches to Dehradun as Chennai–Dehradun Link Express.

Later in 2014, it was extended up to Madurai Junction and ran as Madurai Junction–Chandigarh / Dehradun Link Superfast Express. After July 11, 2021, the slip coaches to Dehradun were discontinued and it runs as a single train to Chandigarh without Dehradun Link Express coaches. Therefore, at present it runs as Madurai Junction–Chandigarh Bi-Weekly Superfast Express. Also it was diverted to run via, Perambur (Chennai), without touching Chennai Central since it has to take reversal done at Chennai Central. At present it takes reversal done only at Erode Junction, it bypasses Chennai Central by without taking reversal. The coach position was also changed. After July 21, 2021, it will not carry AC First Class. It runs with AC Two Tier, AC Three, AC Three Economy, Pantry car,Sleeper class and General Unreserved.

== Coaches ==
The 20493 / 94 Madurai–Chandigarh Superfast Express presently has,

- 1 AC Two Tier,
- 3 AC Three Tier,
- 3 AC Three Tier Economy,
- 9 Sleeper class,
- 1 Pantry car,
- 2 General Unreserved,
- 1 SLR (Seating cum Luggage Rake).

== Service ==
The 20493 Madurai–Chandigarh Superfast Express covers the distance of 3074 kilometres in 51 hours 55 mins (60.34 km/h). It takes 53 hours 45 mins as 20494 Chandigarh–Madurai Express (58 km/h).

As the average speed of the train is above 55 km/h (34 mph), as per Indian Railways rules, its fare includes a Superfast surcharge.

== Route & halts ==
The 20493 / 94 Madurai–Chandigarh Superfast Express runs from Madurai Junction via Dindigul Junction, Karur Junction,Erode Junction, Salem Junction, Jolarpettai Junction, Katpadi Junction, Arakkonam Junction, Perambur, Nayudupeta, Vijayawada Junction, Warangal, Balharshah, Sewagram, Nagpur Junction, Itarsi Junction, Bhopal Junction, Gwalior Junction, Agra Cantonment, Faridabad, Hazrat Nizamuddin, Ghaziabad, Meerut City Junction, Saharanpur Junction, Ambala Cantonment to Chandigarh.

== Direction reversal ==
The train reverses its direction once at;

- Erode Junction.

== Traction ==
As the route is fully electrified, it is hauled by an Erode Loco Shed-based WAP-7 electric locomotive from Madurai Junction to Chandigarh Junction and vice versa.
