= Hukum Singh Karada =

Indian politician

Member of the Madhya Pradesh Legislative Assembly
- In office 1993–2013
- Succeeded by: Arun Bhimawad
- Constituency: Shajapur
- In office 2018–2023
- Preceded by: Arun Bhimawad
- Succeeded by: Arun Bhimawad

Personal details
- Born: 7 June 1956 (age 69) Shajapur District, Madhya Pradesh, India
- Citizenship: India
- Party: Indian National Congress

Hukum Singh Karada (b 1956/57) is an Indian politician belonging to Indian National Congress. He has been representing Shajapur (Vidhan Sabha constituency) as MLA in Madhya Pradesh since 1993, except 2013-18 when he lost to the BJP candidate Arun bhimawad. He was a minister in Madhya Pradesh state government in 2019.
