= Jhansi–Bandra Terminus Express =

Train in India

Jhansi–Bandra Express

Overview
- Service type: Express
- First service: 27 July 2012; 13 years ago
- Current operator(s): North Central Railway

Route
- Termini: Virangana Lakshmibai Jhansi Junction (VGLJ); Bandra Terminus (BDTS)
- Stops: 20
- Distance travelled: 1,318 km (819 mi)
- Average journey time: 23 hours 20 minutes
- Service frequency: Bi-Weekly
- Train number(s): 22195 / 22196

On-board services
- Class(es): AC 2 Tier, AC 3 Tier, Sleeper Class, General Unreserved
- Seating arrangements: Yes
- Sleeping arrangements: Yes
- Catering facilities: On-board catering, E-catering
- Observation facilities: Large windows
- Baggage facilities: No
- Other facilities: Below the seats

Technical
- Rolling stock: LHB coach
- Track gauge: 1,676 mm (5 ft 6 in)
- Operating speed: 57 km/h (35 mph) average including halts.

The 22195 / 22196 Jhansi–Bandra Express is an express train belonging to Indian Railways – North Central Railway zone that runs between Virangana Lakshmibai Jhansi Junction and Bandra Terminus in India.

It operates as train number 22195 from Virangana Lakshmibai Jhansi Junction to Bandra Terminus and as train number 22196 in the reverse direction, serving the states of Uttar Pradesh, Madhya Pradesh, Gujarat & Maharashtra.

== Coaches ==
The train has LHB coach with max speed of 160 km/hour. The train consists of 15 coaches:

- 3 AC 3 tier
- 4 Sleeper class
- 6 Unreserved/General
- 2 Seating cum Luggage Rake

As is customary with most train services in India, coach composition may be amended at the discretion of Indian Railways depending on demand.

== Service ==
22195 Jhansi–Bandra Terminus Express covers the distance of 1318 kilometres in 23 hours 55 mins 55.11 km/h (34 mph) & in 25 hours 35 mins as 22196 Bandra Terminus–Jhansi Express 51.52 km/h (32 mph).

== Route and halts ==
The train runs from Virangana Lakshmibai Jhansi Junction via Gwalior Junction, Guna Junction, Ujjain Junction, Ratlam Junction, Vadodara Junction, Surat, Vapi to Bandra Terminus and vice versa.

== Reversals ==
Train reverses direction of travel only once at Gwalior Junction.

== Rake sharing ==
The train shares its rake with 22197/22198 Pratham Swatrantata Sangram Express.

== Traction ==
Upon introduction, despite electrification of at least 739 km (56%) of the route between Ujjain Junction & Bandra Terminus, it was hauled end to end by a Jhansi-based WDM-3A.

It is now hauled by a Kanpur Loco Shed-based WAP-7 electric locomotive on its entire journey.

== Schedule ==
Train number	Station code	Departure station	Departure time	Departure day	Arrival station	Arrival time	Arrival day
11103	VGLJ	Virangana Lakshmibai Jhansi Junction	16:50 PM	Sun, Mon	Bandra Terminus	16:45 PM	Mon, Tue
11104	BDTS	Bandra Terminus	05:10 AM	Tue, Wed	Virangana Lakshmibai Jhansi Junction	06:45 AM	Wed, Thu
