= Indore–Amritsar Express =

Train in India

Indore-Amritsar Express
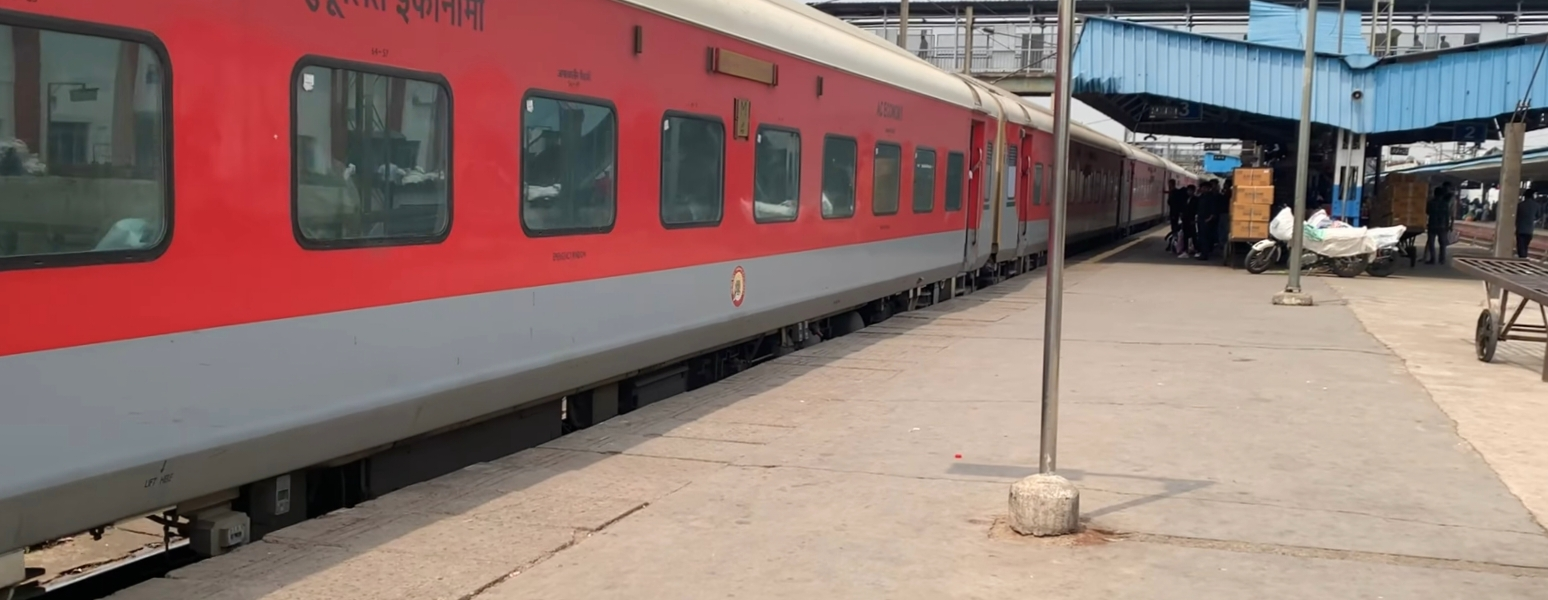
- Indore-Amritsar Express train At Ambala Cantonment Junction railway station

Overview
- Service type: Express
- Locale: Madhya Pradesh, Uttar Pradesh, Delhi, Haryana, Punjab
- First service: 15 January 2008; 18 years ago
- Current operator: Western Railway

Route
- Termini: Indore Junction (INDB); Amritsar Junction (ASR)
- Stops: 23
- Distance travelled: 1,336 km (830 mi)
- Average journey time: 29 hrs 10 mins
- Service frequency: Bi-weekly
- Train number: 19325 / 19326

On-board services
- Classes: AC 2 Tier, AC 3 Tier, Sleeper Class, General Unreserved
- Seating arrangements: Yes
- Sleeping arrangements: Yes
- Catering facilities: On-board Catering, E-Catering
- Observation facilities: Large windows
- Baggage facilities: Available
- Other facilities: Below the seats

Technical
- Rolling stock: LHB coach
- Track gauge: 1,676 mm (5 ft 6 in)
- Operating speed: 46 km/h (29 mph) average including halts.

The 19325 / 19326 Indore–Amritsar Express is an express trains of the Indian Railways which runs between Indore Junction in Madhya Pradesh and Amritsar Junction in Punjab.

== Coach composition ==
The train consists of 22 LHB coaches:

- 1 AC II Tier
- 4 AC III Tier
- 11 Sleeper Class
- 4 General Unreserved
- 2 End on Generator

== Route & halts ==
- Amritsar Junction
- Beas Junction
- Jalandhar City Junction
- Ludhiana Junction
- Ambala Cantonment
- Saharanpur Junction
- Meerut City Junction
- Ghaziabad Junction
- Hazrat Nizamuddin
- Mathura Junction
- Agra Cantonment
- Gwalior Junction
- Guna Junction
- Maksi Junction
- Dewas Junction
- Indore Junction

== Traction ==
It is hauled by a Vadodara Loco Shed based WAP-7 electric locomotive from end to end.
