= Delhi Shahdara Junction railway station =

Railway station in Delhi, India

Delhi Shahdara Junction
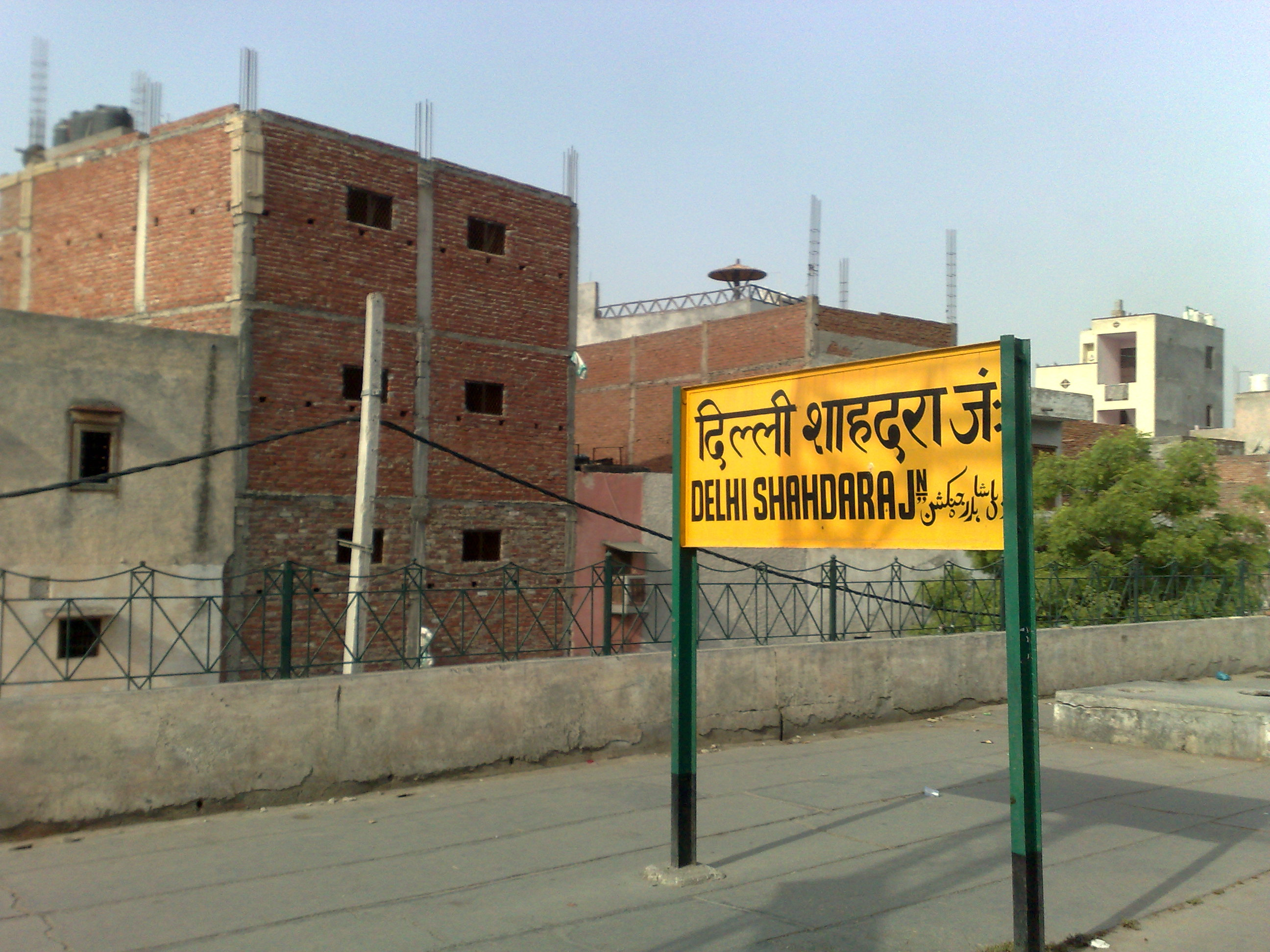

General information
- Location: Shahdara, Delhi; India
- Coordinates: 28.6734°N 77.2922°E
- Elevation: 209 m (686 ft)
- System: Indian Railways station
- Owner: Indian Railways
- Operator: Northern Railway zone
- Platforms: 4 BG
- Tracks: 4 BG
- Connections: Red Line Shahdara

Construction
- Structure type: At grade
- Parking: Available
- Cycle facilities: Available

Other information
- Station code: DSA
- Zone(s): Northern Railway
- Division(s): Delhi

Services
Preceding station	Indian Railways	Following station
Vivek Vihar towards Sahibabad Junction	Northern Railway zone	Delhi Junction towards New Delhi
Location
- Location within India Location within Delhi

Delhi Shahdara Junction railway station (station code: DSA) is a railway station in the Shahdara district of Delhi. It is located on the Sahibabad Junction-Delhi Junction branch of the Delhi-Howrah main line. The station was opened in 1907 as part of the Shahdara–Saharanpur light railway built by Martin's Light Railways, which connected the station to Saharanpur in UP. It was closed in 1970 and reopened a few years later after the line was converted to broad gauge.

The station, which has four platforms and three radiating lines, is maintained by Northern Railways. As per the categorization of Indian Railway stations by commercial importance, it is ranked NSG-3, and has also been classified as a 'sensitive' station.

== Services ==
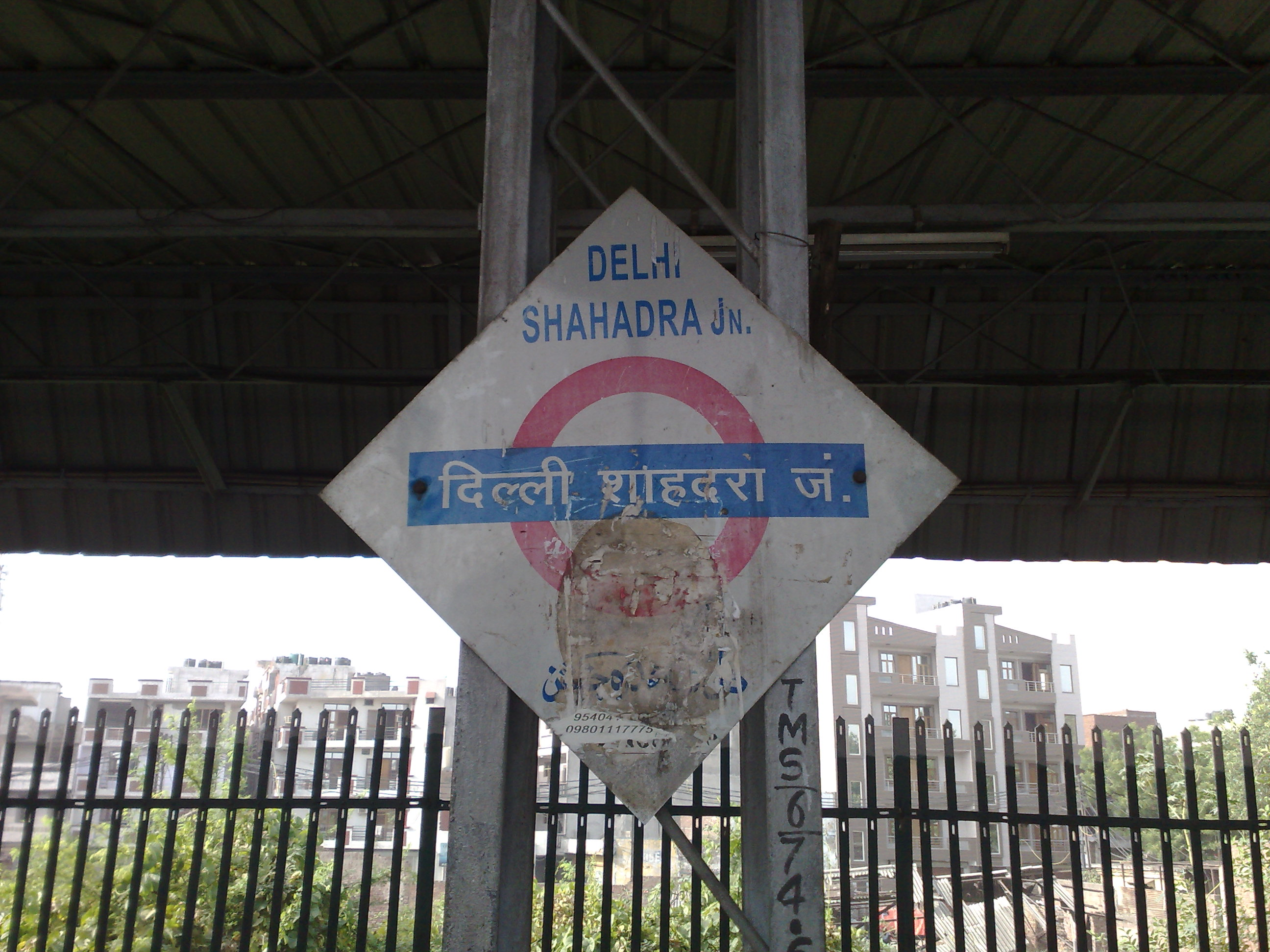
Delhi Shahdara Junction railway station – Platform board

=== Rail ===
The station has the following trains passing, originating, or terminating at it:

- Haridwar–Bikaner Special Fare Special
- Garhwal Express
- Kalindi Express
- Mussoorie Express
- Sikkim Mahananda Express
- Farakka Express (via Faizabad)
- Farakka Express (via Sultanpur)
- Satyagrah Express
- Yoga Express
- Loknayak Express
- Amrapali Express
- Farrukhnagar–Saharanpur Janta Express
- Delhi–Ambala Cantonment Intercity Express
- Himachal Express

=== Metro ===
The railway station is located about 100 metres away from the Shahdara station of Delhi Metro's Red Line, which was one of the termini of its first section opened on 25 December 2002.

=== Bus ===
The railway station is located about 500 meters away from DTC's Shahdara bus terminal, and is served by bus routes 208, 214, 221, 236 (NS), 236, 236EXT, 246, 273, 317, 319, 319A, 341, 354, 443, 623, 623B, 702, 720, 939, 946, and 982.
