= Vivek Vihar =

Neighbourhood of Delhi, India

Coordinates: 28°40′N 77°19′E

Vivek Vihar is one of 3 subdivisions of Delhi's Shahdara district, near the edge of Ghaziabad as well as a small neighbourhood in that subdivision located beside just besides the Choudhary Charan Singh road along with Uttar Pradesh border.

== Vivek Vihar subdivision ==
The Vivek Vihar subdivision consists of 5 main areas:

- Karkarduma
- Oldenpur
- Chandrawali
- Ghondali
- Seelampur
- Jhilmil

== Vivek Vihar colony ==
Vivek Vihar is one of the most premier localities of Shahdara and primarily consists of residential developments dominated by builder floors and independent houses. The locality is horizontal in nature and comprises low-rise establishments. It is systematically laid-out and has been divided into 4 blocks - blocks A to D. The area is close to other important areas of eastern Delhi such as Anand Vihar, Jhilmil Colony, Surajmal Vihar, Vishwas Nagar, Bihari Colony, Teliwara and Bhola Nath Nagar. The Hanuman Balaji temple, located on Unnati Marg, is a major religious attraction. It was established in the year 1998.

=== Connectivity ===
- Delhi Metro: The area is located close to the Dilshad Garden metro station and Jhilmil metro station of the Red Line, and the Anand Vihar metro station and Karkardooma metro station of the Blue and Pink lines.
- Indian Railways: The area is served by the Vivek Vihar railway station, which is on the Sahibabad-Shahdara-Delhi Junction branch of the Delhi-Howrah line.
- Bus: DTC bus routes 313, 336, 340, 342, 358, and 704 serve the area from the Vivek Vihar bus stop.
