= Chandni Chowk metro station =

Chandni Chowk metro station may refer to:

- Chandni Chowk metro station (Delhi), a metro station on the Yellow Line of Delhi Metro
- Chandni Chowk metro station (Kolkata), a metro station on the Blue Line of Kolkata Metro
- Chandni Chowk metro station (Pune), a metro station on the Aqua Line of Pune Metro
