= Garhwal Express =

Express train in India

Siddhabali Janshatabdi
Overview
- Service type: Express
- Current operator: Northern Railways

Route
- Termini: Kotdwar; Delhi
- Stops: 11
- Distance travelled: 238 km (148 mi)
- Average journey time: 7 hours 10 minutes as 14043 Kotdwar–Delhi Garhwal Express, 7 hours 00 minutes as 14044 Delhi–Kotdwar Garhwal Express
- Service frequency: Daily
- Train number: 14043 / 14044

On-board services
- Classes: AC Chair Car, Second Class seating
- Seating arrangements: Yes
- Sleeping arrangements: No
- Catering facilities: No pantry car attached

Technical
- Rolling stock: Standard Indian Railways coaches
- Track gauge: 1,676 mm (5 ft 6 in)
- Operating speed: 110 km/h (68 mph) maximum 33.80 km/h (21 mph) including halts

The 14044 / 43 Delhi–Kotdwar Garhwal Express is an Express train belonging to Indian Railways – Northern Railway zone that runs between Delhi and Kotdwar in India.

It operates as train number 14044 from Delhi to Kotdwar and as train number 14043 in the reverse direction serving the states of Uttarakhand, Uttar Pradesh and Delhi.

== Coaches ==
The 14044 / 43 Delhi–Kotdwar Garhwal Express has 1 AC Chair Car 3 Second Class sitting, 6 General Unreserved and 2 SLR (seating cum luggage rake) coaches. It does not carry a pantry car.

As is customary with most train services in India, coach composition may be amended at the discretion of Indian Railways depending on demand.

== Service ==
The 14044 Delhi–Kotdwar Garhwal Express covers the distance of 238 kilometres in 07 hours 00 mins (34.00 km/h) and in 07 hours 05 mins as 14043 Kotdwar–Delhi Garhwal Express (33.60 km/h).

== Routeing ==
The 14044 / 43 Delhi–Kotdwar Garhwal Express runs from Delhi via Ghaziabad, Hapur, Gajraula Junction, Najibabad Junction to Kotdwar.

It reverses direction of travel at Gajraula Junction.

== Traction ==
As large sections of the route are yet to be electrified, Tughlakabad or Ludhiana-based WDM-2 or WDM-3A locomotives haul the train for its entire journey.

== Timings ==
14044 Delhi–Kotdwar Garhwal Express leaves Delhi on a daily basis at 07:20 hrs IST and reaches Kotdwar at 14:20 hrs IST the same day.

14043 Kotdwar–Delhi Garhwal Express leaves Kotdwar on a daily basis at 15:10 hrs IST and reaches Delhi at 22:15 hrs IST the same day.

== Latest update ==
The Train is no longer running. Instead Sidhbali Jan Shatabdi Express has taken its place.
