= Sahibabad Junction railway station =

Railway Station in India

Sahibabad Junction
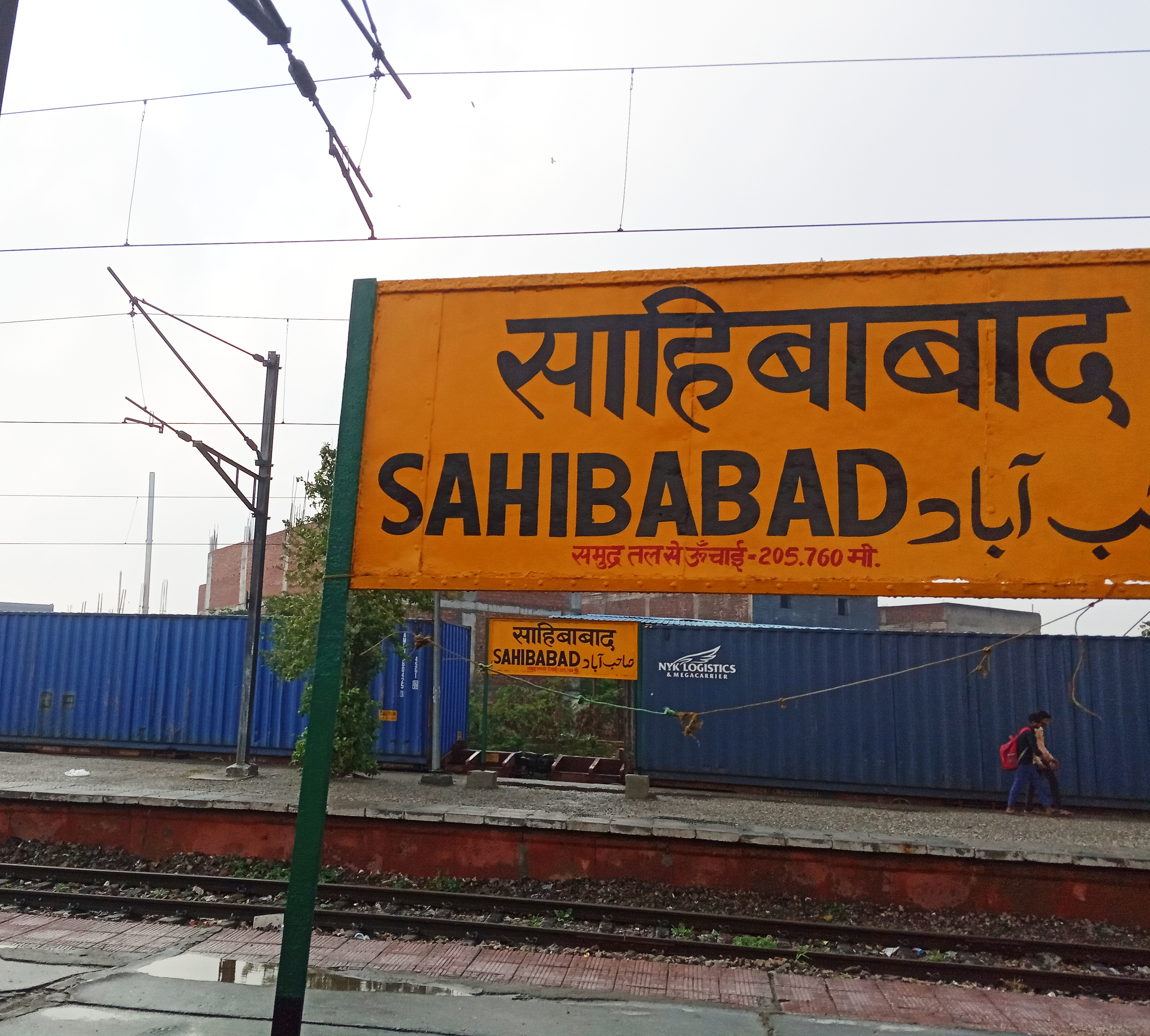
- Sahibabad railway station in 2020

General information
- Location: Sahibabad, Ghaziabad district, Uttar Pradesh; India
- Elevation: 209 metres (686 ft)
- System: Indian Railway and Delhi Suburban Railway station
- Owner: Indian Railways
- Operator: Northern Railway
- Line: Kanpur–Delhi section
- Platforms: 5
- Tracks: 8

Construction
- Structure type: Standard (on-ground station)
- Parking: No
- Cycle facilities: No

Other information
- Status: Active
- Station code: SBB
- Zone(s): Northern Railway
- Division(s): Delhi
Location

Sahibabad Junction railway station is a railway station in Ghaziabad district, Uttar Pradesh, India. Its code is SBB. It serves Sahibabad city. The station has five platforms.

Sahibabad is a junction station because the railway line on one side splits in two: one line connects to New Delhi railway station via Anand Vihar railway station and the other line to Delhi junction via Delhi Shahdara. The other side line connects with Ghaziabad Junction railway station.

== Trains ==
- Chhattisgarh Express
- Bandra Terminus–Dehradun Express
- Bareilly–New Delhi Intercity Express
- Corbett Park Link Express
- Farakka Express (via Faizabad)
- Farakka Express (via Sultanpur)
- Ranikhet Express
- Satyagrah Express
- Unchahar Express
- Panchvalley Passenger
