= Amritsar–Delhi Junction Vande Bharat Express =

Mini Vande Bharat Express train route in India

Amritsar Junction - Delhi Junction Vande Bharat Express
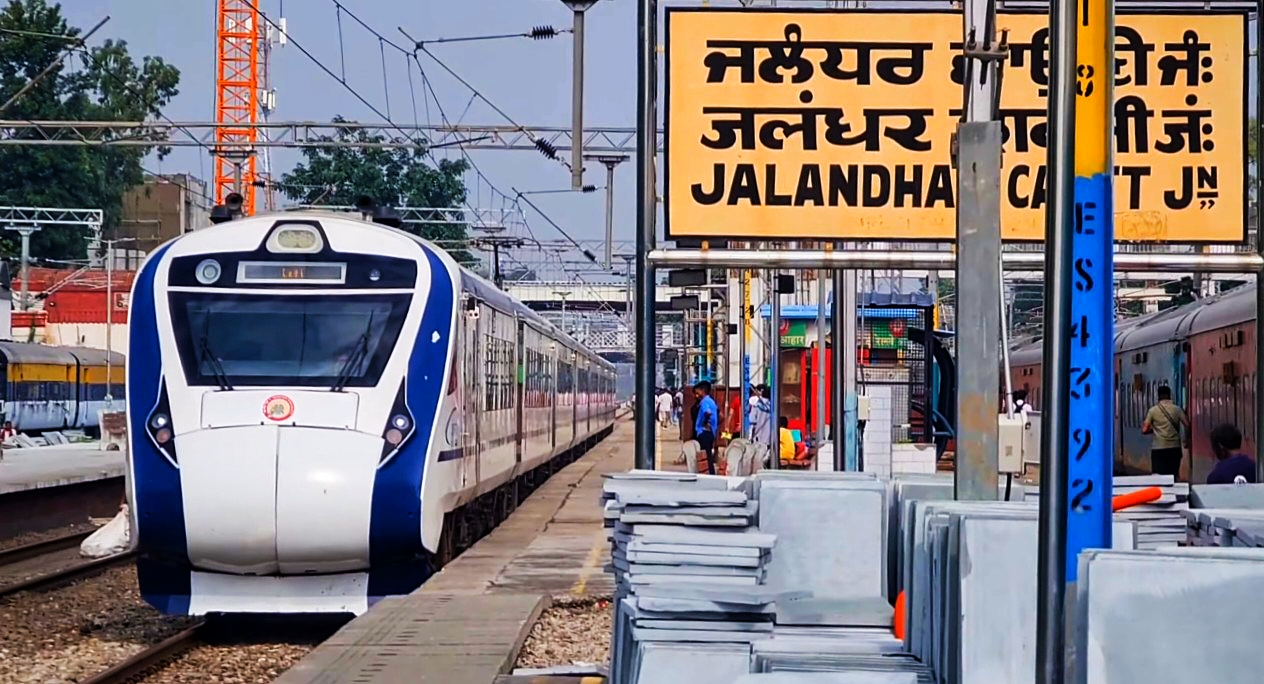
- Amritsar New Delhi Junction Vande Bharat express At Jalandhar Cantt.

Overview
- Service type: Vande Bharat Express
- Locale: Punjab, Haryana and New Delhi
- First service: 30 December 2023 (Inaugural); 6 January 2024; 2 years ago (Commercial)
- Current operator: Northern Railways (NR)

Route
- Termini: Amritsar Junction (ASR); Delhi Junction (DLI)
- Stops: 5
- Distance travelled: 447 km (278 mi)
- Average journey time: 05 hrs 30 mins
- Service frequency: Six days a week (Note: Except Fridays)
- Train number: 22488 / 22487
- Lines used: Amritsar–Ambala line; Kalka–Delhi line (till Delhi Jn.)

On-board services
- Classes: AC Chair Car, AC Executive Chair Car
- Seating arrangements: Airline style; Rotatable seats
- Sleeping arrangements: No
- Catering facilities: On board Catering
- Observation facilities: Large windows in all coaches
- Entertainment facilities: On-board WiFi; Infotainment System; Electric outlets; Reading light; Seat Pockets; Bottle Holder; Tray Table
- Baggage facilities: Overhead racks
- Other facilities: Kavach

Technical
- Rolling stock: Vande Bharat 2.0
- Track gauge: Indian gauge 1,676 mm (5 ft 6 in) broad gauge
- Electrification: 25 kV 50 Hz AC Overhead line
- Operating speed: 81 km/h (50 mph) (Avg.)
- Average length: 384 metres (1,260 ft) (16 coaches)
- Track owner: Indian Railways
- Rake maintenance: Delhi Jn (DLI)

The 22488/22487 Amritsar - Delhi Junction Vande Bharat Express is India's 38th Vande Bharat Express train, connecting the metropolitan city of Amritsar with the capital city of India, New Delhi.

This express train was inaugurated on 30 December 2023 by Prime Minister Narendra Modi via video conferencing from Ayodhya Dham Junction.

== Overview ==
This train is operated by Indian Railways, connecting Amritsar Jn, Beas Jn, Jalandhar Cantt. Jn, Phagwara Jn, Ludhiana Jn, Ambala Cantt. Jn and Delhi Jn. It is currently operated with train numbers 22448/22447 on 6 days a week basis.

== Rakes ==
It is the thirty-sixth 2nd Generation Vande Bharat 2.0 which was designed and manufactured by the Integral Coach Factory at Perambur, Chennai under the Make in India Initiative.

== Service ==
The 22488/22487 Amritsar Jn - Delhi Jn Vande Bharat Express operates six days a week except Fridays, covering a distance of 447 km (278 mi) in a travel time of 5 hours with an average speed of 81 km/h (50 mph). The service has 5 intermediate stops. The Maximum Permissible Speed is 130 km/h (81 mph).

== See also ==
- Vande Bharat Express
- Tejas Express
- Gatimaan Express
- Amritsar Junction railway station
- Delhi Junction railway station
