= Chandni Chowk metro station (Delhi) =

Metro station in Delhi, India

Chandni Chowk

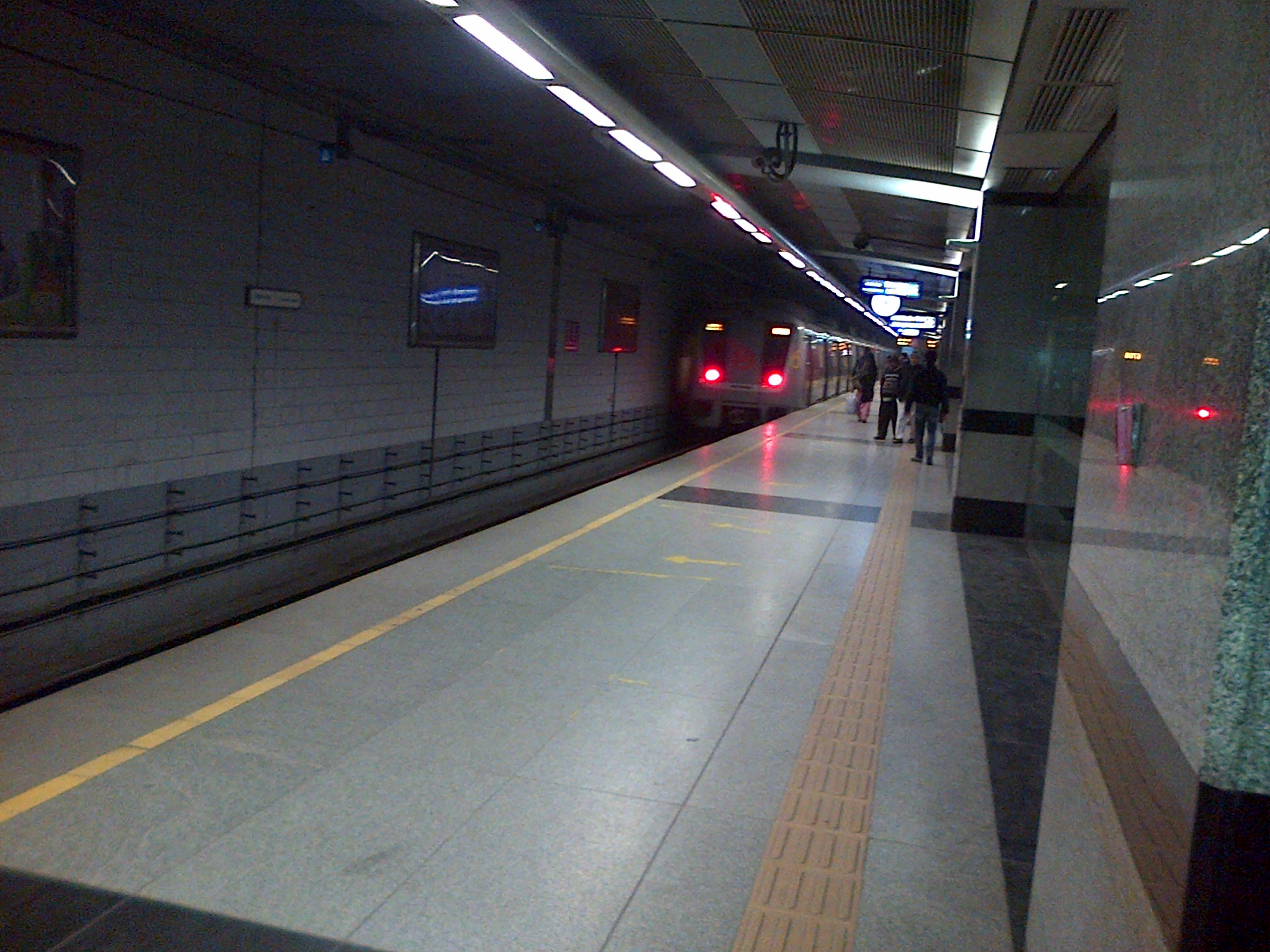

General information
- Location: Chandni Chowk, Old Delhi; India
- Coordinates: 28°39′28″N 77°13′49″E
- System: Delhi Metro station
- Owner: Delhi Metro
- Line: Yellow Line
- Platforms: Island Platform; Platform-1 → Millennium City Centre Gurugram; Platform-2 → Samaypur Badli
- Tracks: 2
- Connections: Delhi Junction

Construction
- Structure type: Underground
- Platform levels: 1
- Accessible: Yes - From Gate No. 2 (Delhi public library)

Other information
- Station code: CHK

History
- Opened: 3 July 2005; 21 years ago
- Electrified: 25 kV 50 Hz AC through overhead catenary

Passengers
- 2017: 150,000

Services
Preceding station	Delhi Metro	Following station
Kashmere Gate towards Samaypur Badli	Yellow Line	Chawri Bazar towards Millennium City Centre Gurugram
Route map
Location

Chandni Chowk is an underground metro station on the Yellow Line of the Delhi Metro. It serves the Chandni Chowk market area in Old Delhi and provides access to several nearby historical landmarks, including the Red Fort. The station is directly connected to Old Delhi railway station (Delhi Junction) through a 400 metres (1,300 ft) air-conditioned underground subway, providing a convenient link between the metro and the Indian Railways network.

== Station layout ==
G	Street Level	Exit/ Entrance
C	Concourse	Fare control, station agent, Ticket/token, shops
P	Platform 1 Southbound	Towards → Millennium City Centre Gurugram; Next Station: Chawri Bazar
P	Island platform | Doors will open on the right
P	Platform 2 Northbound	Towards ← Samaypur Badli; Next Station: Kashmere Gate Change at the next station for Red Line or Violet Line

== See also ==
- Chandni Chowk
- Red Fort
- Old Delhi Railway Station
- List of Delhi Metro stations
- Transport in Delhi
- Delhi Metro Rail Corporation
- Delhi Suburban Railway
- Delhi Transport Corporation
- North Delhi
- National Capital Region (India)
- List of rapid transit systems
- List of metro systems
