= Delhi–Ambala Cantonment Intercity Express =

Delhi Junction – Ambala Cantonment Junction Intercity Express
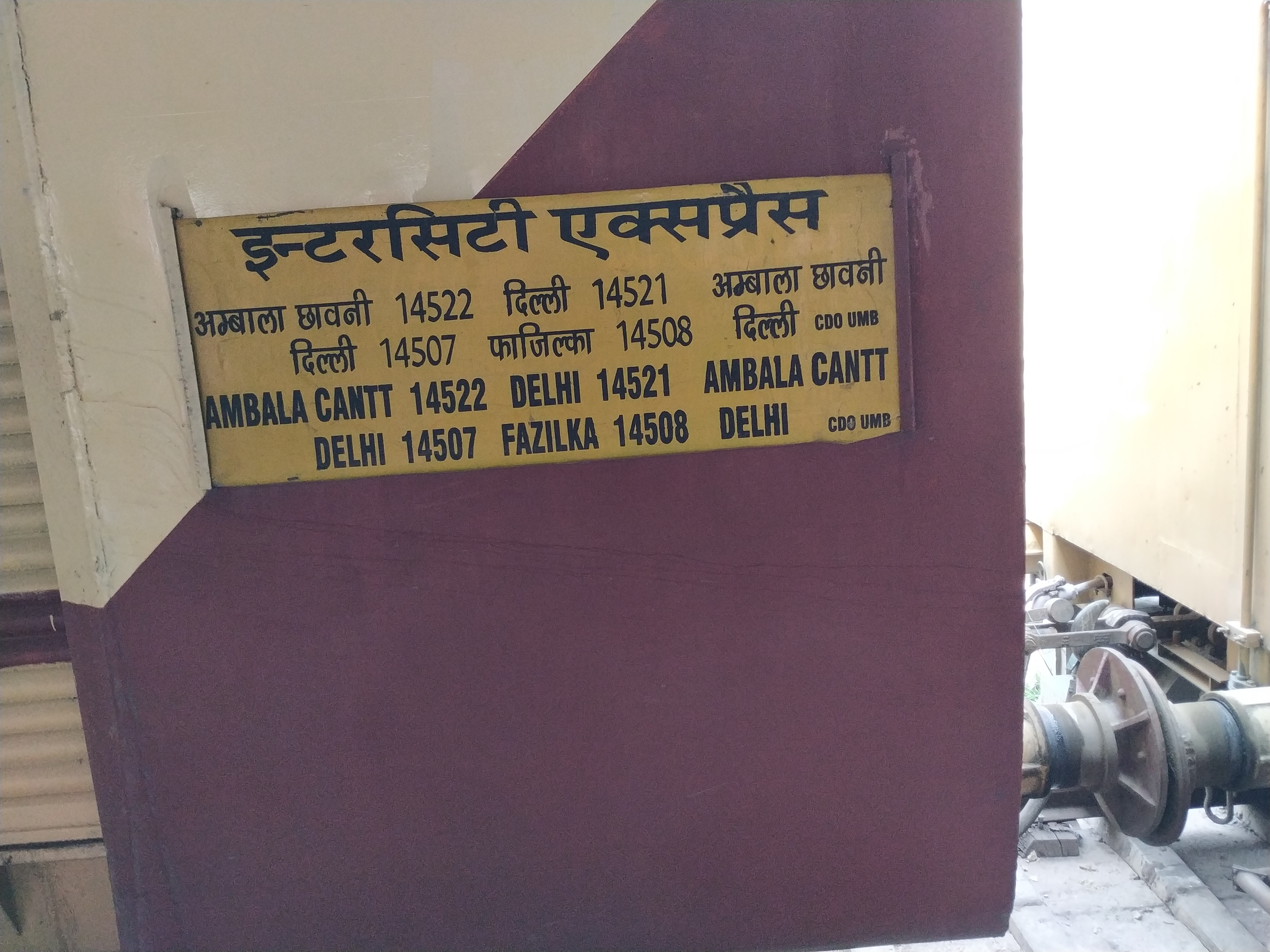
- Delhi–Ambala Cantonment Intercity Express board

Overview
- Service type: Express
- First service: 15 September 2013; 12 years ago
- Current operator: Northern Railway zone

Route
- Termini: Delhi Junction; Ambala Cantonment Junction
- Stops: 11
- Distance travelled: 262 km (163 mi)
- Service frequency: Daily
- Train number: 14521 / 14522

On-board services
- Classes: AC Chair car, general unreserved
- Seating arrangements: Yes
- Sleeping arrangements: No
- Catering facilities: No

Technical
- Rolling stock: Standard Indian Railways Coaches
- Track gauge: 1,676 mm (5 ft 6 in)
- Operating speed: 44 km/h (27 mph)

The 14521 / 22 Delhi Junction – Ambala Cantonment Junction Intercity Express is an Express train belonging to Indian Railways Northern Railway zone that runs between Delhi Junction and Ambala Cantonment Junction in India.

It operates as train number 14521 from Delhi Junction to Ambala Cantonment Junction and as train number 14522 in the reverse direction serving the states of Haryana, Uttar Pradesh & Delhi.

== Coaches ==
The 14521 / 22 Delhi Junction – Ambala Cantonment Junction Intercity Express has one AC Chair Car, ten general unreserved & two SLR (seating with luggage rake) coaches . It does not carry a pantry car coach.

As is customary with most train services in India, coach composition may be amended at the discretion of Indian Railways depending on demand.

== Service ==
The 14521 Delhi Junction – Ambala Cantonment Junction Intercity Express covers the distance of 262 km (163 mi) in 6 hours 00 mins (44 km/h) and in 6 hours 00 mins as the 14262 Ambala Cantonment Junction – Delhi Junction Intercity Express (44 km/h).

As the average speed of the train is less than 55 km/h (34 mph), as per railway rules, its fare doesn't includes a Superfast surcharge.

== Routing ==
The 14521 / 22 Delhi Junction – Ambala Cantonment Junction Intercity Express runs from Delhi Junction via Ghaziabad Junction, Meerut City, Saharanpur Junction to Ambala Cantonment Junction.

== Traction ==
As the route is going to be electrified, a Ghaziabad based WAP-7 electric locomotive pulls the train to its destination.
