= Mussoorie Express =

Train in India

Mussorrie Express
Overview
- Service type: Express
- First service: 28 June 1939; 86 years ago
- Current operator: Northern Railway

Route
- Termini: Old Delhi Junction (DLI); Dehradun (DDN)
- Stops: 17
- Distance travelled: 339 km (211 mi)
- Average journey time: 10 hours 40 minutes
- Service frequency: Daily
- Train number: 14041 / 14042

On-board services
- Classes: AC First Class, AC 2 Tier, AC 3 Tier, Sleeper Class, General Unreserved
- Seating arrangements: Yes
- Sleeping arrangements: Yes
- Catering facilities: E-catering only
- Observation facilities: Large windows
- Baggage facilities: No
- Other facilities: Below the seats

Technical
- Rolling stock: ICF coach
- Track gauge: 1,676 mm (5 ft 6 in)
- Operating speed: 31 km/h (19 mph) average including halts.

The 14041 / 14042 Mussoorie Express is an express train belonging to Indian Railways – Northern Railways zone that runs between Old Delhi Junction and Dehradun, Uttarakhand.

It operates as train number 14041 from Old Delhi Junction to Dehradun and as train number 14042 in the reverse direction.

== Coaches ==
The 14041/42 Delhi Junction-Deradun Mussoorie Express presently has 1 AC 1st Class, 1 AC 2 tier, 2 AC 3 tier, 8 Sleeper Class, 5 Second Class seating and 2 SLR (Seating cum Luggage Rake) coaches.

As with most train services in India, coach composition may be amended at the discretion of Indian Railways depending on demand.

In addition, slip coaches of the 24041/24042 Mussoorie Express are also attached to the train at Haridwar.

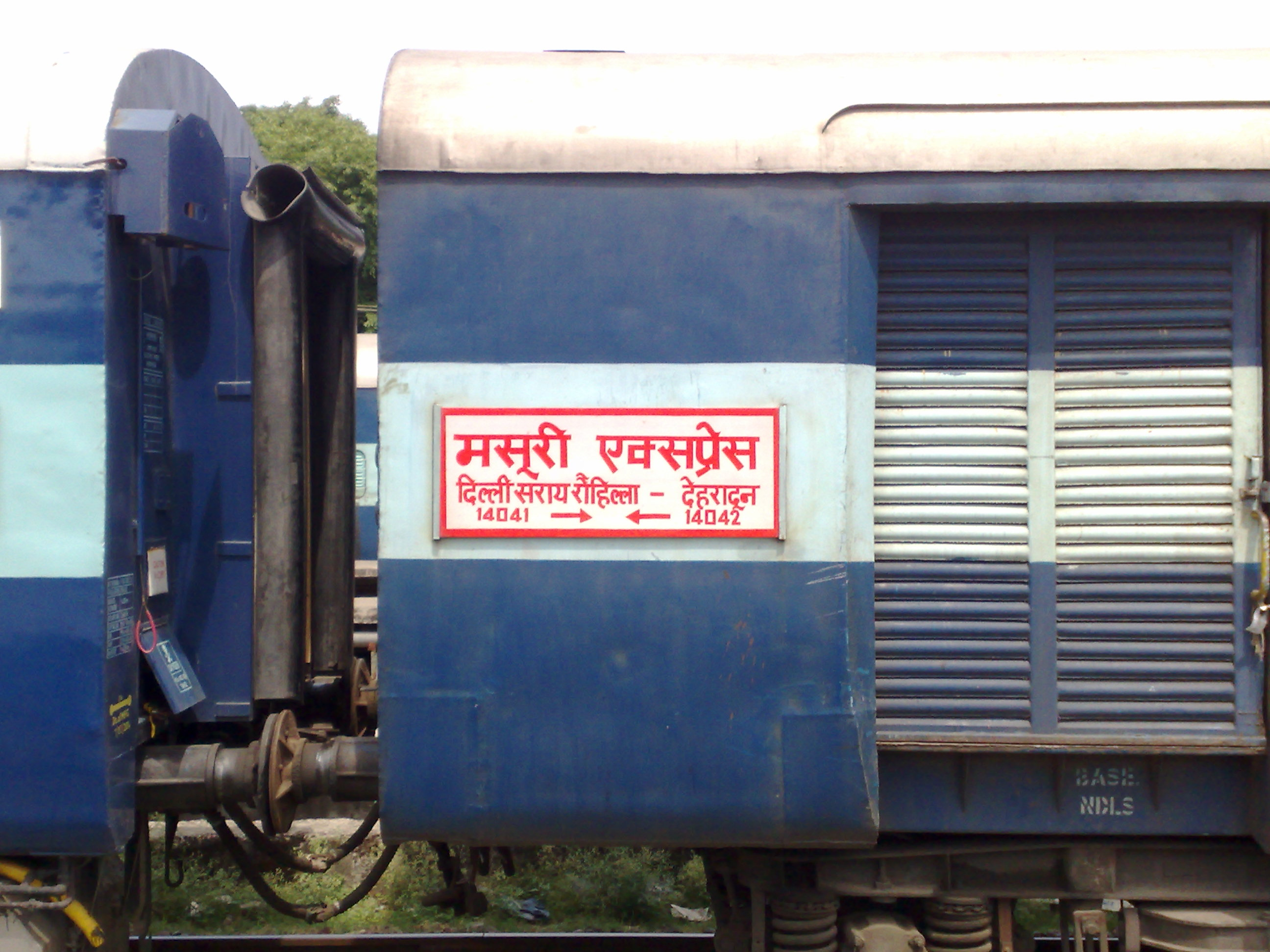
Mussoorie Express trainboard

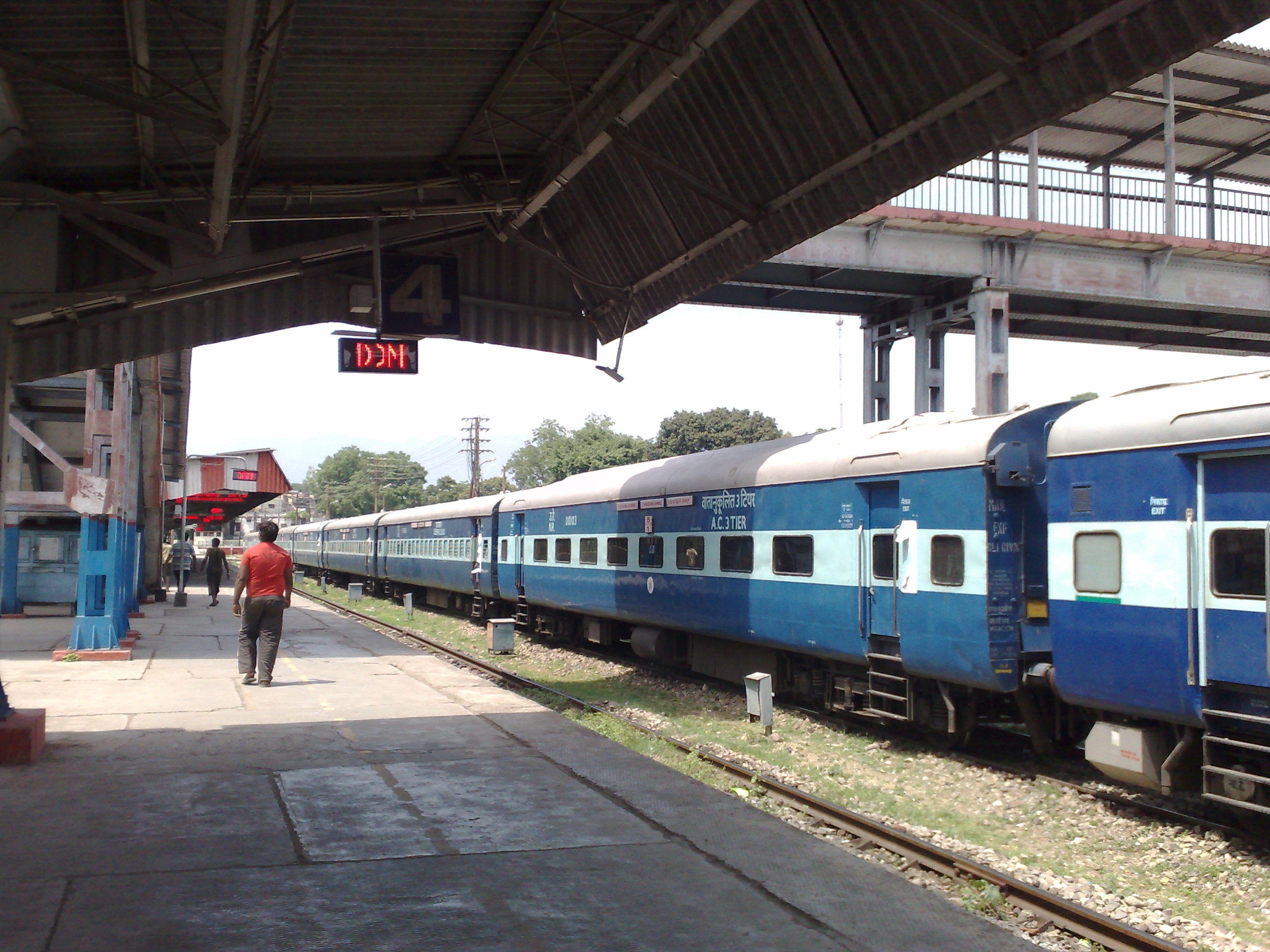
Mussoorie Express at Dehradun

== Service ==
The 14041/42 Delhi Junction–Dehradun Mussoorie Express covers the distance of 339 kilometres in 10 hours 40 mins as 14041 Delhi Junction–Dehradun Mussoorie Express (31.78 km/h) and in 11 hrs 05 mins as 14042 Dehradun–Delhi Junction Mussoorie Express (30.59 km/h).

As the average speed of the train is below 55 km/h (34 mph), as per Indian Railways rules, its fare does not include a Superfast surcharge.

== Routeing ==
The 14041/42 Delhi Junction–Dehradun Mussoorie Express runs via Ghaziabad Junction, Gajraula, Najibabad, Laksar Junction, Haridwar Junction to Dehradun.

== Traction ==
As the route is electrified, a Ghaziabad Loco Shed-based WAP-7 electric locomotive on its entire journey.

== Time table ==
14041 Delhi Junction–Dehradun Mussoorie Express leaves Delhi Junction on a daily basis at 22:25 hrs IST and reaches Dehradun at 08:10 hrs IST the next day.

14041 Delhi Junction–Dehradun Mussoorie Express leaves Dehradun on a daily basis at 21:25 hrs IST and reaches Delhi Junction at 08:30 hrs IST the next day.

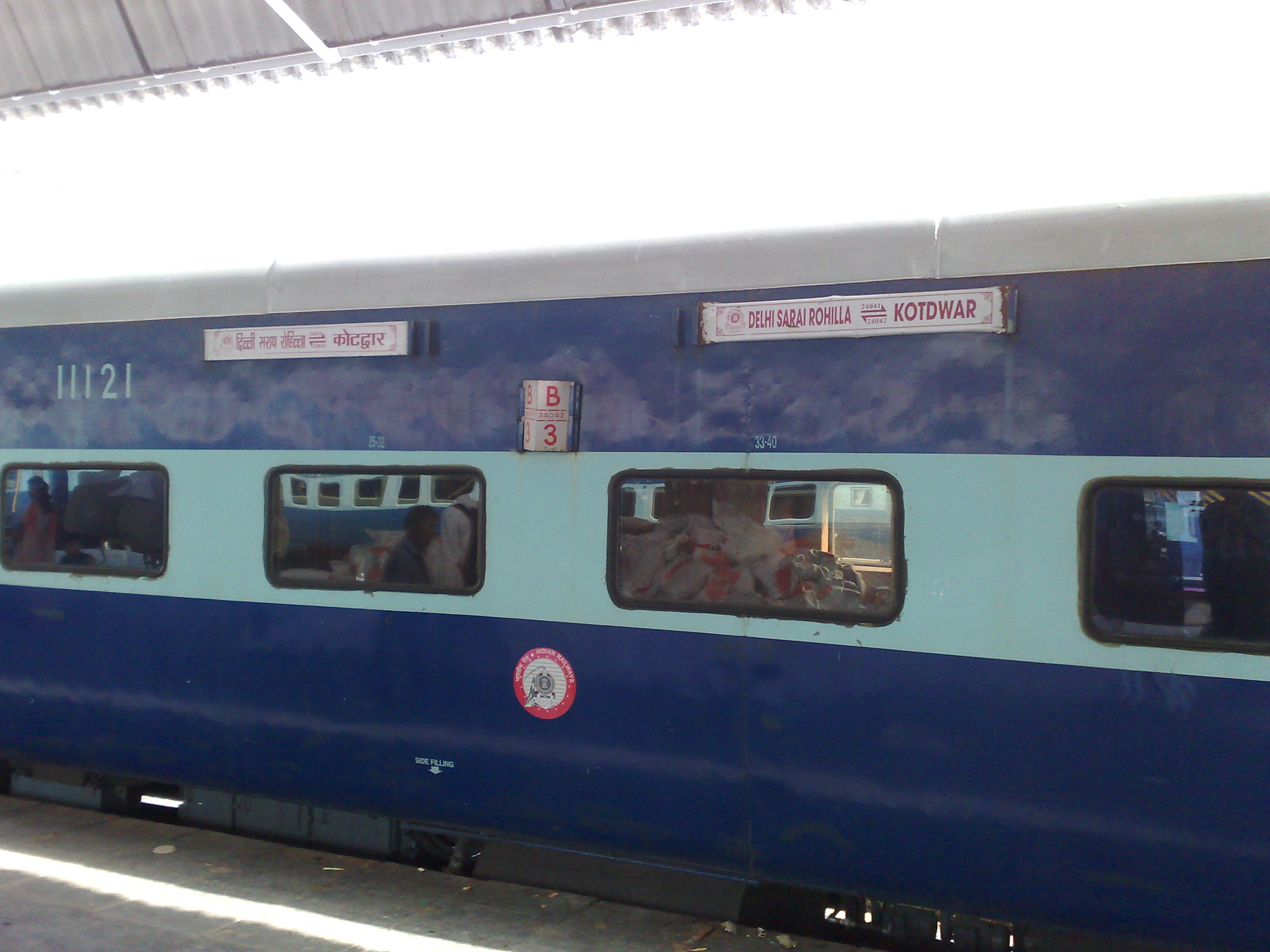
24042 Mussoorie Express – AC 3 tier
