= Himachal Express =

Train in India

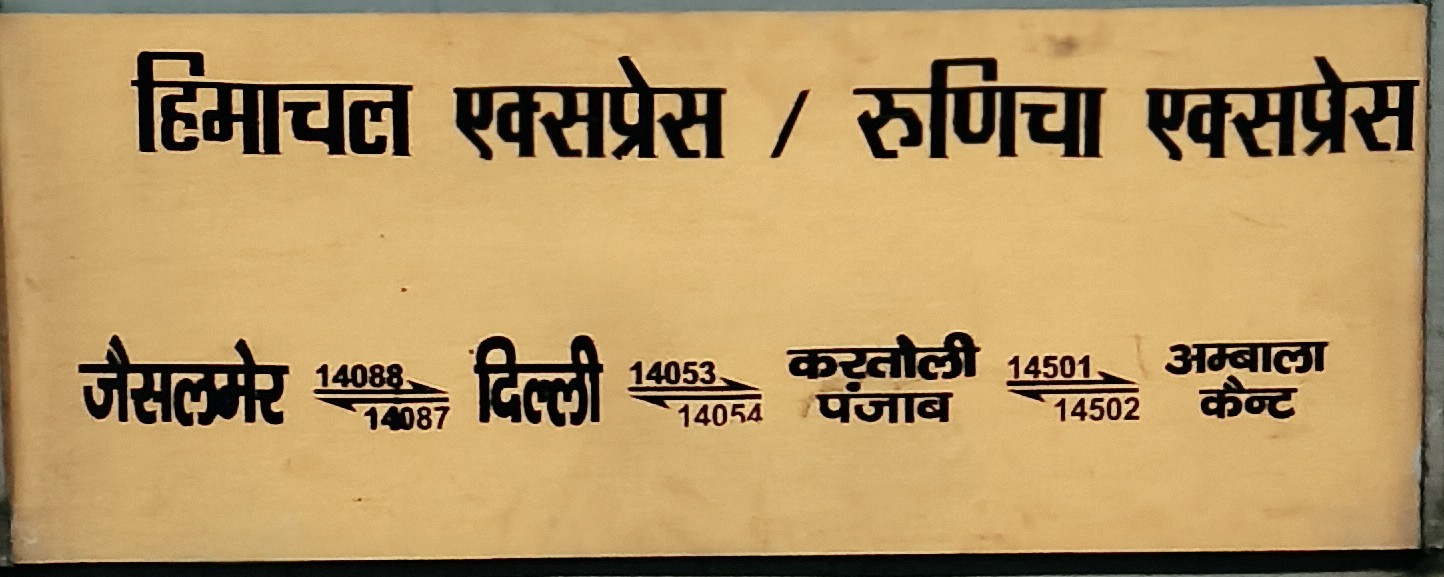

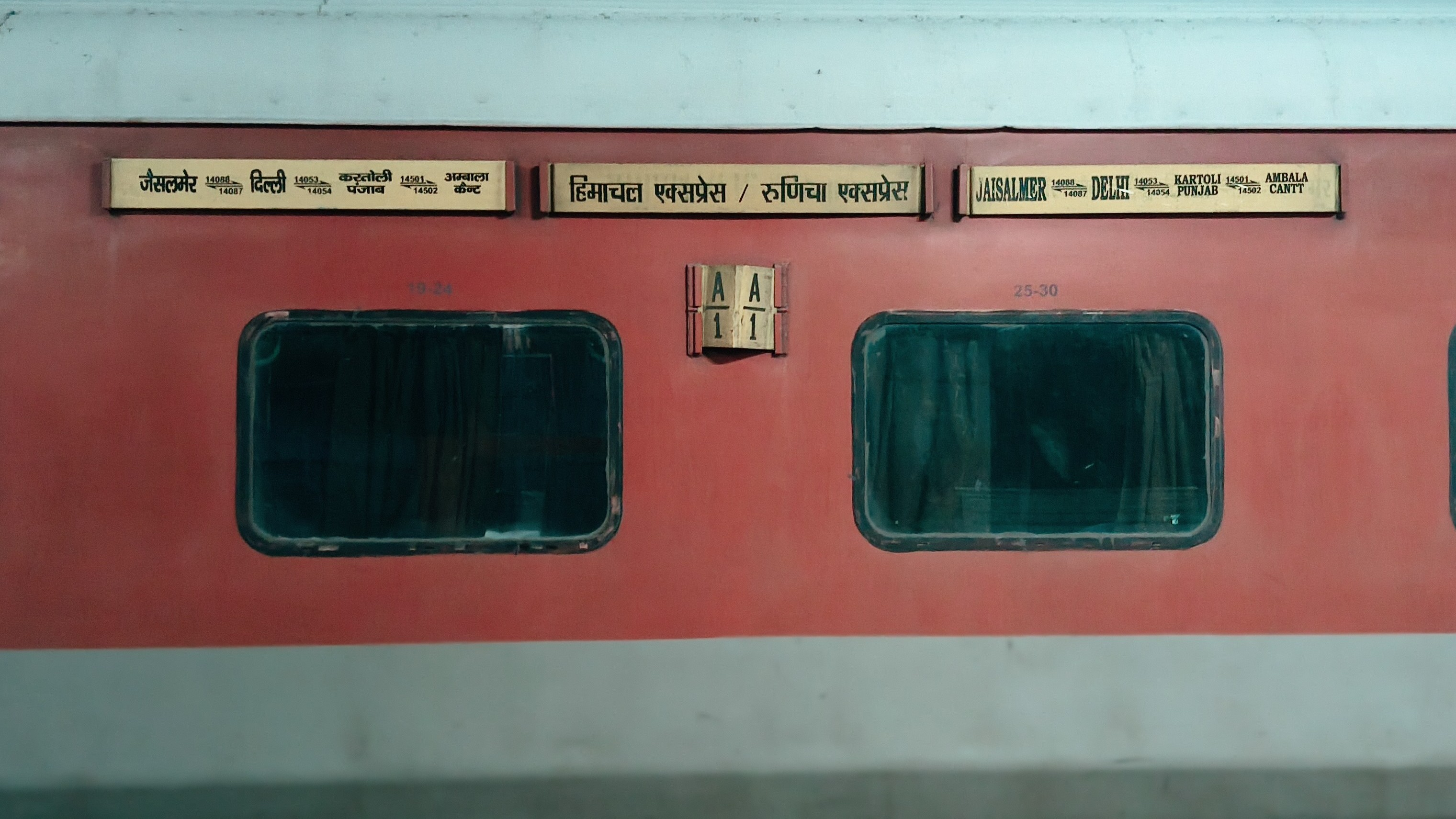
- Himachal Express at Delhi Jn. Railway station, c. 2026

Overview
- Service type: Express
- First service: 4 July 2005; 21 years ago
- Current operator: Northern Railway

Route
- Termini: Old Delhi Junction (DLI); Kartoli Punjab (KRTP)
- Stops: 27 as 14053; 24 as 14054
- Distance travelled: 426 km (265 mi)
- Average journey time: 8h 32 mins (9 hours (up), 8 hours 5 mins (down))
- Service frequency: Daily
- Train number: 14053 / 14054

On-board services
- Classes: AC First Class, AC 2 Tier, AC 3 Tier, Sleeper Class, General Unreserved
- Seating arrangements: Yes
- Sleeping arrangements: Yes
- Catering facilities: E-catering
- Observation facilities: Large windows
- Baggage facilities: No
- Other facilities: Below the seats

Technical
- Rolling stock: LHB coach
- Track gauge: 1,676 mm (5 ft 6 in)
- Operating speed: 50 km/h (31 mph) average including halts.

The 14053 / 14054 Himachal Express is an express train belonging to Indian Railways – Northern Railway zone that runs between Delhi Junction & Kartoli Punjab Station of the Indian Railways network.

It operates as train number 14053 from Delhi to Kartoli Punjab and as train number 14054 in the reverse direction, serving the states of Himachal Pradesh, Punjab, Haryana & Delhi.

It is named after the Indian state of Himachal Pradesh & like most trains such as Kerala Express, Tamil Nadu Express, Telangana Express which are named after the states they serve, it connects the state to the National Capital.

== Coaches ==
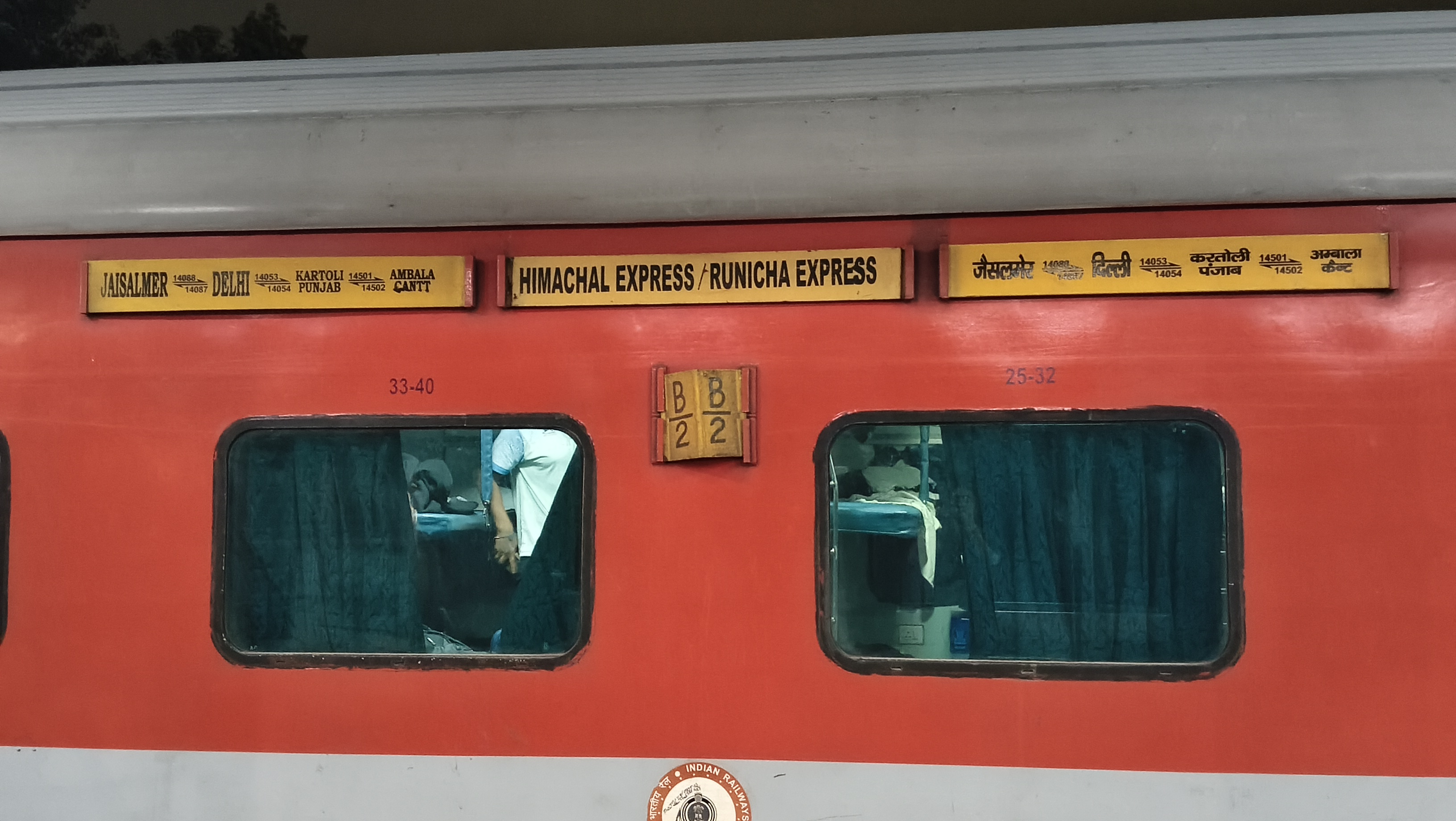
3rd AC coaches of Himachal Express

The 14053 / 54 Himachal Express has 1 AC 1st Class, 1 AC 2 tier, 3 AC 3 tier, 5 Sleeper class, 4 Unreserved/General , 1 Seating cum Luggage Rake Coaches & 1 Luggage cum Generator car. It does not carry a pantry car.

As is customary with most train services in India, coach composition may be amended at the discretion of Indian Railways depending on demand.

== Service ==
The 14053 Himachal Express covers the distance of 426 km (265 mi) in 9 hours with an average speed 47 km/h (29 mph) & in 8 hours 5 mins as 14054 Himachal Express having an average speed 52 km/h (32 mph).

Since the average speed of the train is below 55 km/h (34 mph), as per Indian Railways rules, its fare does not include a superfast surcharge.

== Routeing ==
The 14053 / 14054 Himachal Express runs from Old Delhi Junction via Panipat Junction, Ambala Cantonment, Rajpura Junction, Sirhind, Rupnagar, Nangal Dam, Una Himachal, Amb Andaura to Kartoli Punjab.

== Traction ==
As the entire route is fully electrified, it is hauled by a Ghaziabad Loco Shed-based WAP-5 / WAP-7 electric locomotive on its entire journey.

== Operation ==
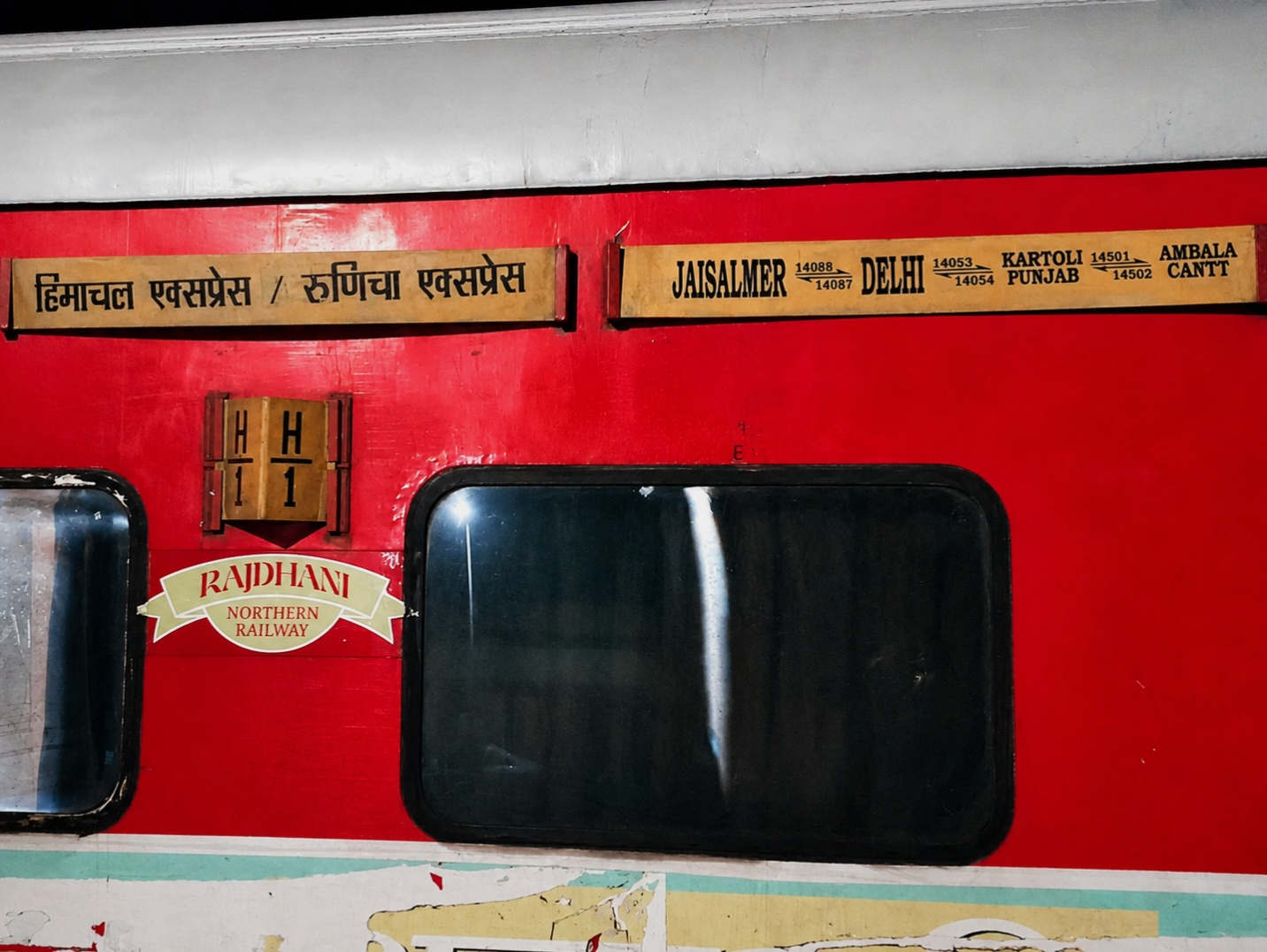
1st AC coach of Himachal Express

- 14053 Himachal Express runs from Old Delhi Junction on a daily basis at 22:50 hours reaching Kartoli Punjab the next day at 07:50 hours.
- 14054 Himachal Express runs from Kartoli Punjab on a daily basis at 20:55 hours reaching Old Delhi Junction the next day at 05:00 hours.

== Rake sharing ==
The train shares its rake with

- 14087/14088 Runicha Express
- 14501/14502 Kartoli Punjab-Ambala Cantt. Intercity Express.
