= Amrapali Express =

Train in India

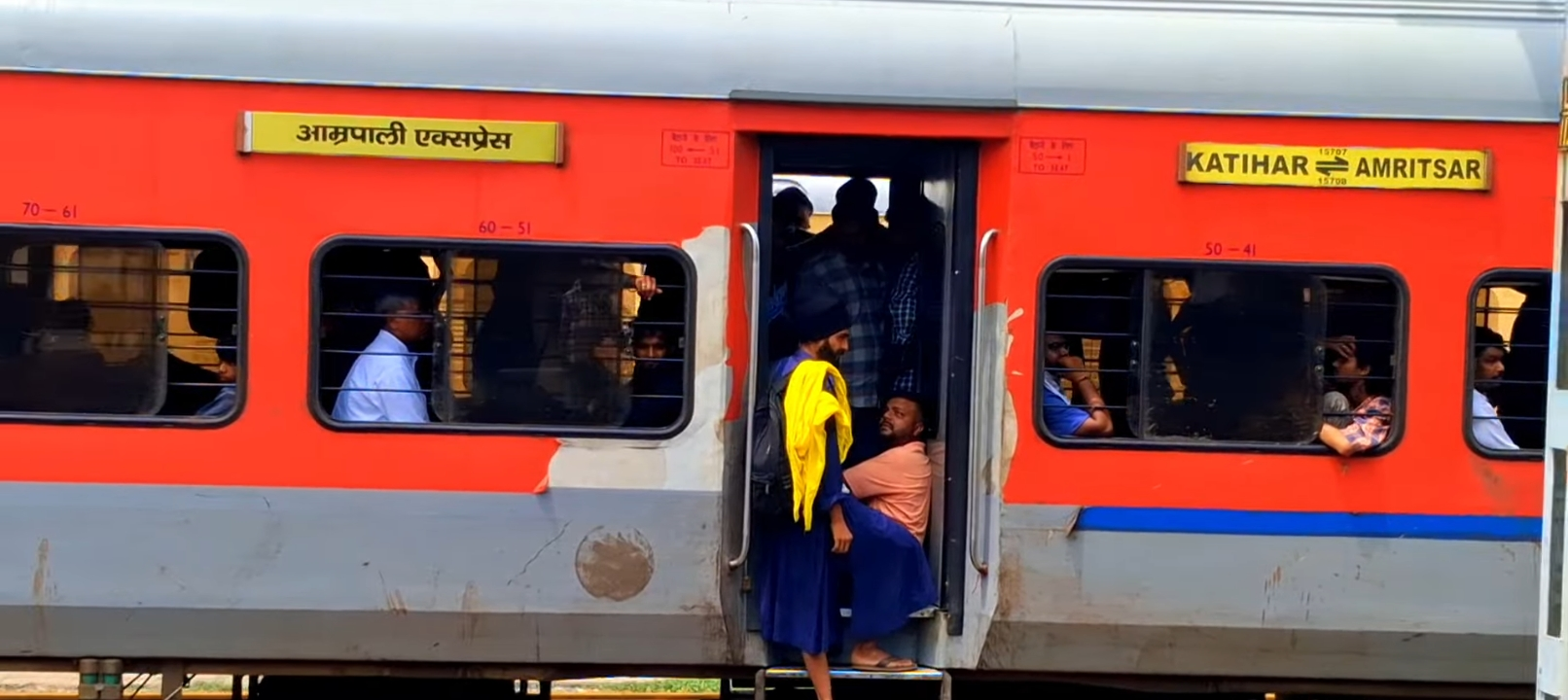

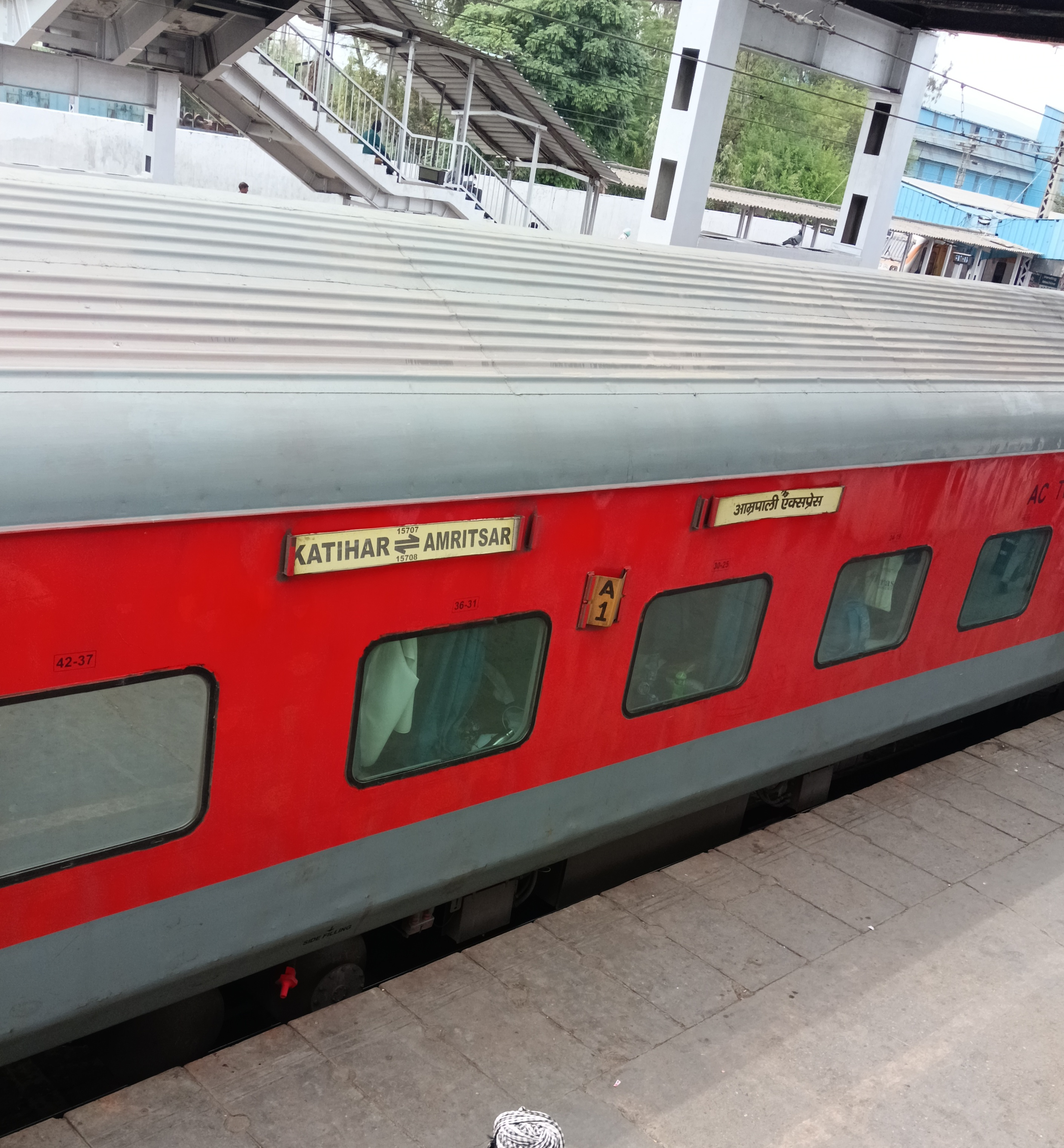
- Amrapali Express At Ambala cantt

Overview
- Service type: Express
- Locale: Bihar, Uttar Pradesh, Delhi, Haryana & Punjab
- Current operator: Northeast Frontier Railways

Route
- Termini: Katihar (KIR); Amritsar (ASR)
- Stops: 50
- Distance travelled: 1,805 km (1,122 mi)
- Average journey time: 37 hours 50 minutes
- Service frequency: Daily
- Train number: 15707 / 15708

On-board services
- Classes: AC 2-tier, AC 3-tier, Sleeper class, General Unreserved
- Seating arrangements: Yes
- Sleeping arrangements: Yes
- Catering facilities: On-board catering, E-catering
- Observation facilities: Large windows
- Baggage facilities: Below the seats

Technical
- Rolling stock: LHB coach
- Track gauge: 1,676 mm (5 ft 6 in)
- Operating speed: 51 km/h (32 mph) average including halts
Route map
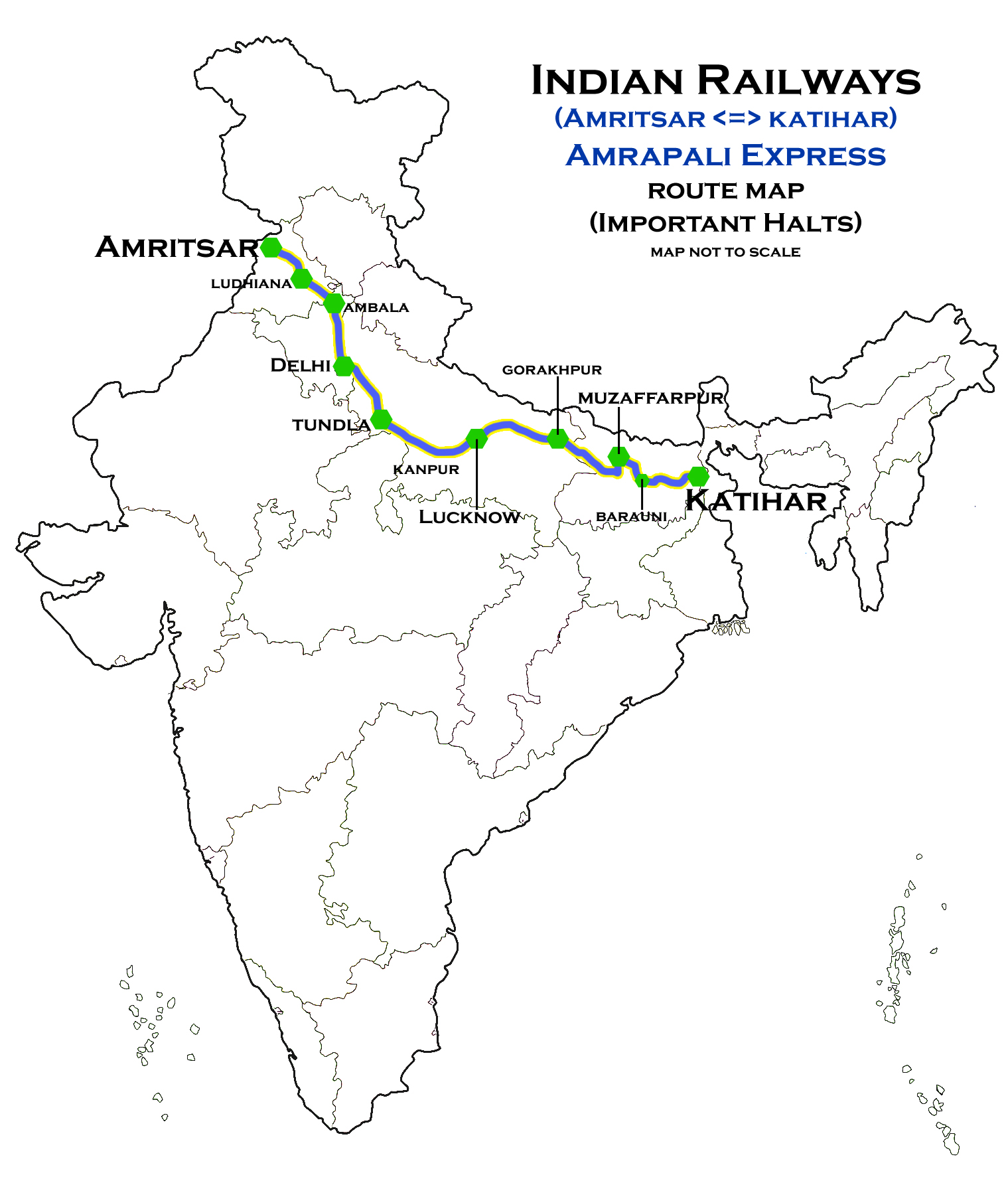

The 15707 / 15708 Amrapali Express is an Express train belonging to Indian Railways that runs between Katihar Junction and Amritsar Junction in India. It operates as train number 15707 in Up direction from Katihar Junction of North east Frontier railway to Amritsar of Northern Railway and as train number 15708 in the reverse direction.

== Train name etymology ==
Ambapali, also known as Ambapalika or Amrapali, was a nagarvadhu (royal courtesan) of the republic of Vaishali in present-day Bihar around 500 BC. Following the Buddha's teachings she became an Arahant. She was of unknown parentage, and received her name because at her birth she was found at the foot of a mango tree in one of the royal gardens in Vaishali. The name, Ambapali or Amrapali, is derived from a combination of two Sanskrit words: "amra", meaning mango, and "pallawa", meaning young leaves or sprouts.

== History ==
The service initially operated by the North Eastern Railway between Kanpur and Samastipur with service numbers 505/506. Soon the train got extended to Barauni Junction. When Indian Railway shifted to four digit service numbers in October 1988, the new service numbers allotted to it were 5205/5206.Very soon the other end of the train got extended from Kanpur to Delhi. In the year 1992, the then Railway Minister Jaffer Sharief proposed with yet another extension to Amritsar which eventually took place. In later developments the train got extended to Katihar Junction and operational responsibility shifted to North East Frontier Railway. The new number allotted to the service are 5707/5708 and when Indian Railway shifted to five digit numbering system the present numbers have been 15707/15708.

== Coaches ==
The 15707/15708 Amrapali Express presently has AC 2-tier, AC 3-tier, Sleeper class, General Unreserved and EOG cum luggage coaches. It has no pantry car coach. Although the rake comprises 22 LHB coach, the coach composition, however, may be amended at the discretion of Indian Railways, depending on demand.

== Service ==
The 15707 Amrapali Express covers the distance of 1799 kilometres in 37 hours (48 km/h). As the average speed of the train is below 55 km/h, its fare does not include a Superfast surcharge.

== Route & halts ==
- Katihar
- Naugachia
- Khagaria Junction
- Barauni
- Samastipur
- Muzaffarpur Junction
- Hajipur
- Chhapra Junction
- Siwan Junction
- Deoria
- Gorakhpur
- Basti
- Gonda Junction
- Lucknow Aishbagh
- Kanpur Central
- Etawah Junction
- Firozabad
- Tundla
- Hathras
- Aligarh
- Old Delhi
- Panipat
- karnal
- Ambala Cantonment
- Ludhiana
- Phillaur
- Phagwara
- Jalandhar City
- Beas Junction
- Amritsar

== Traction ==
The train is hauled by a WAP-5 / WAP-7 locomotive of Ghaziabad Electric Loco Shed from Katihar to Amritsar and vice versa.

== Timetable ==
- 15707 Amrapali Express departs from Katihar Junction daily at 22:45 hrs IST and arrives at Amritsar Junction at 12:45 hrs IST after a 38 hours journey.
- 15708 Amrapali Express departs from Amritsar Junction daily at 07:10 hrs IST and arrives at Katihar Junction at 19:55 hrs IST after a 36 hours 45 minutes journey.

== Gallery ==
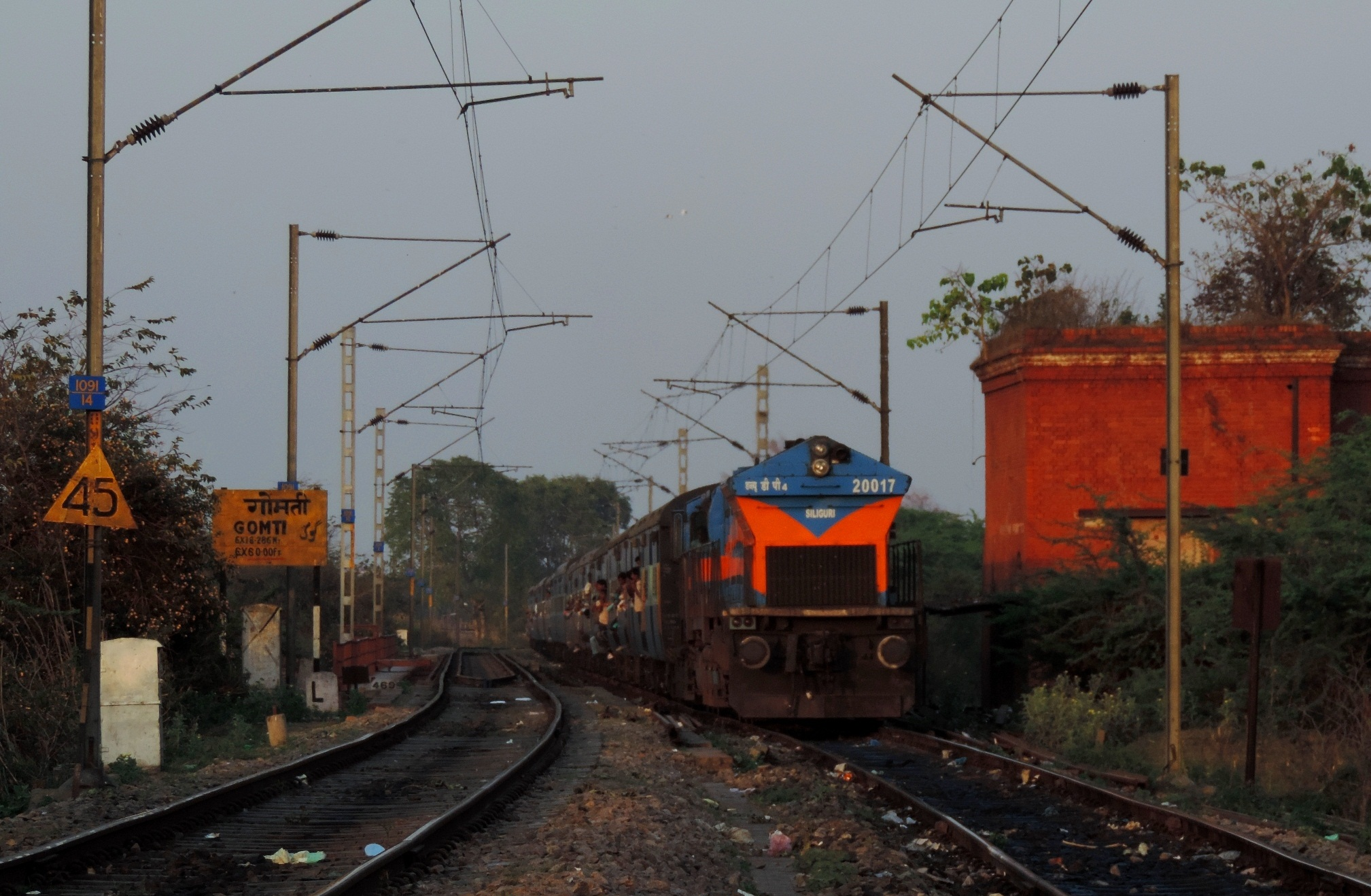
Amrapali Express crossing Gomti river

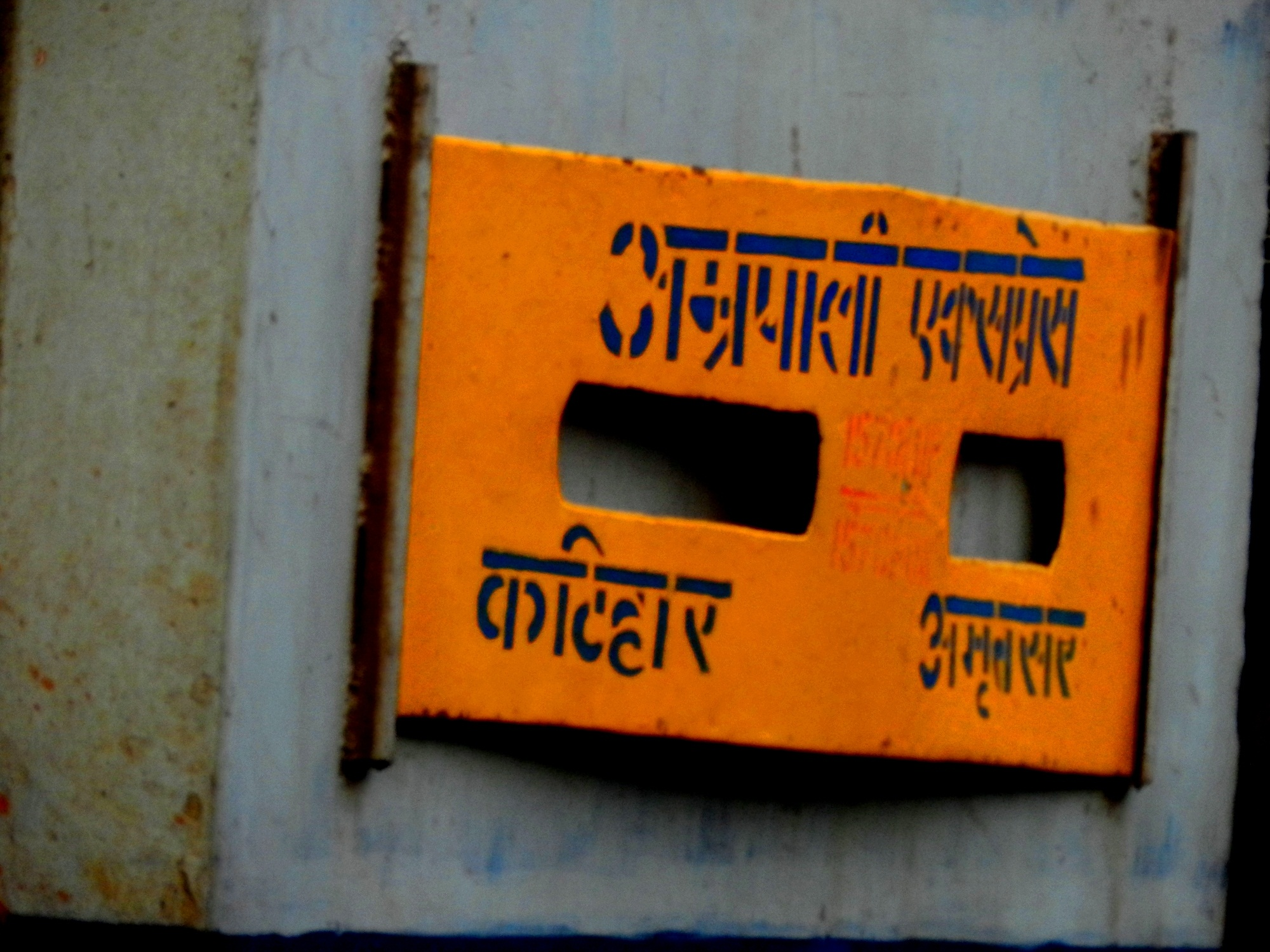
Amrapali Express train board

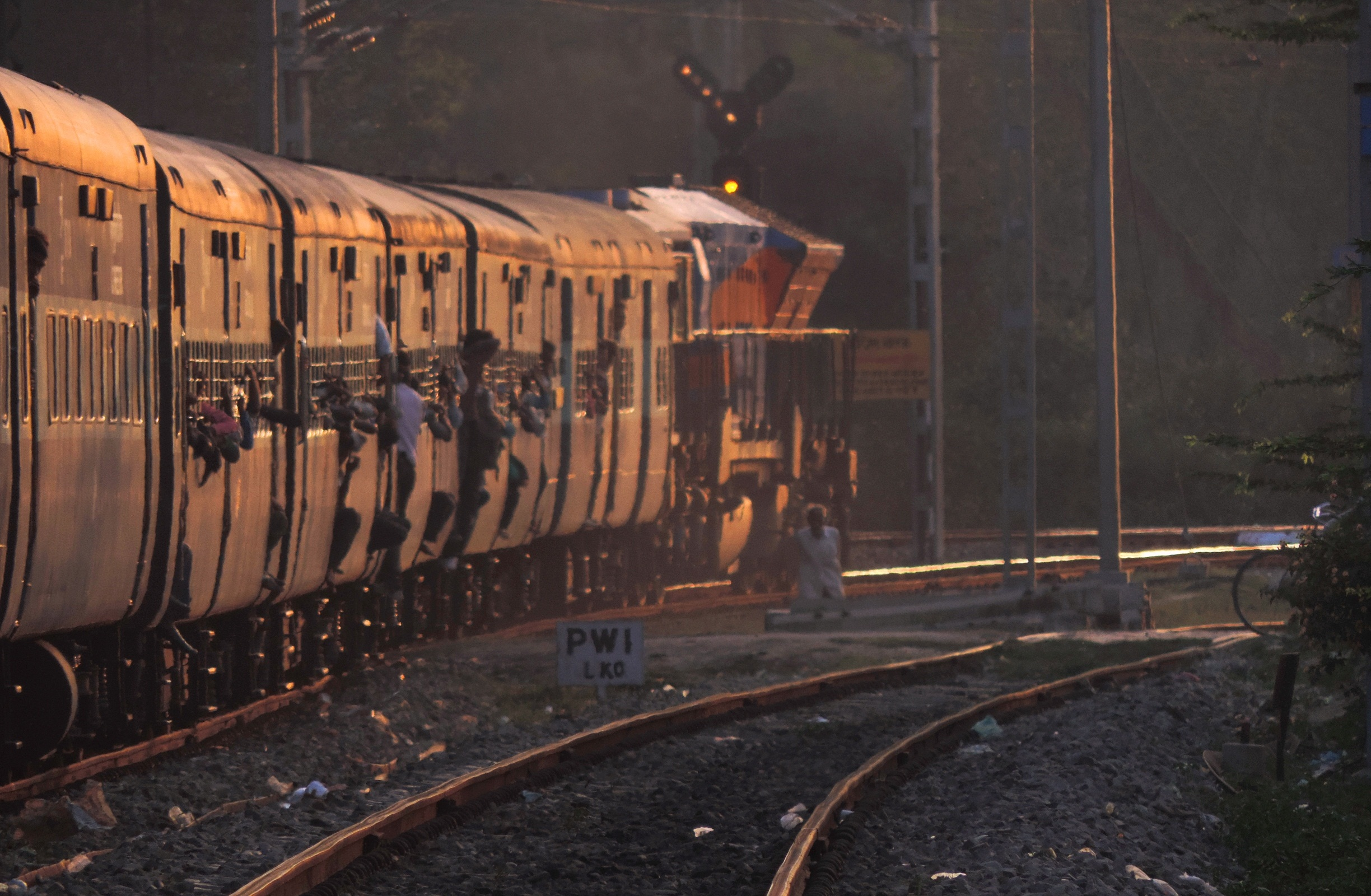
Amrapali Express on a fine evening

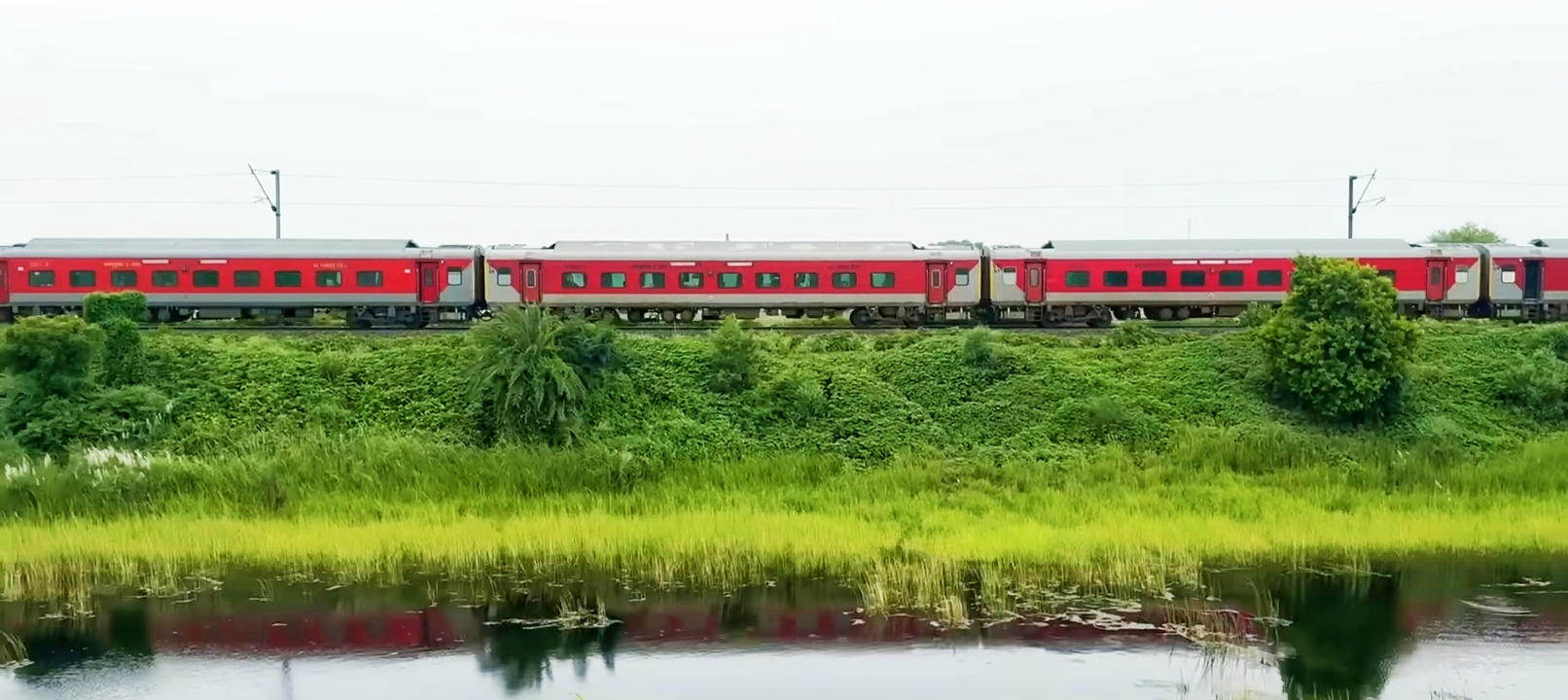
Amrapali Express Arriving Sonpur Junction

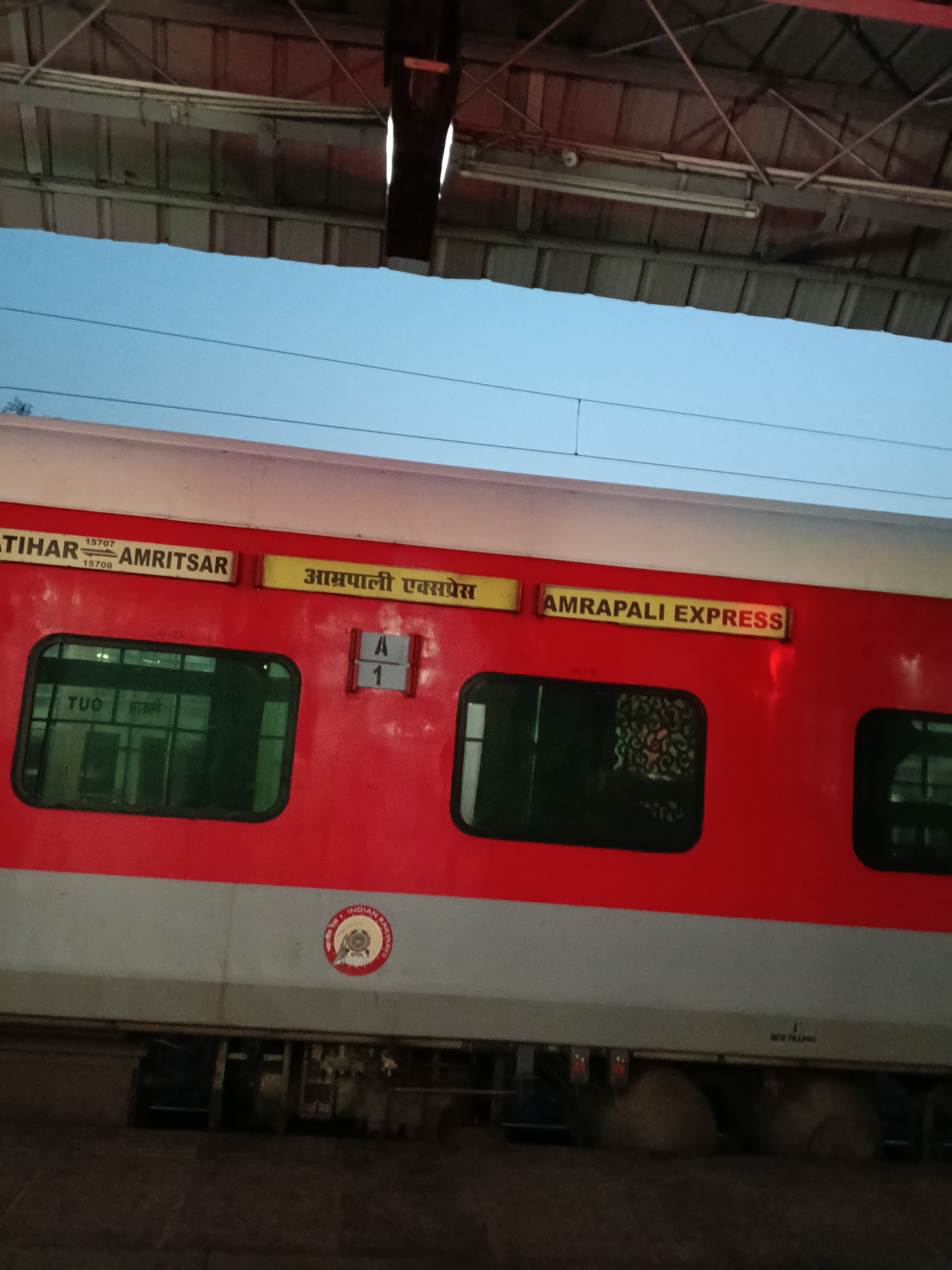
Amrapali Express At Kurukshetra Junction

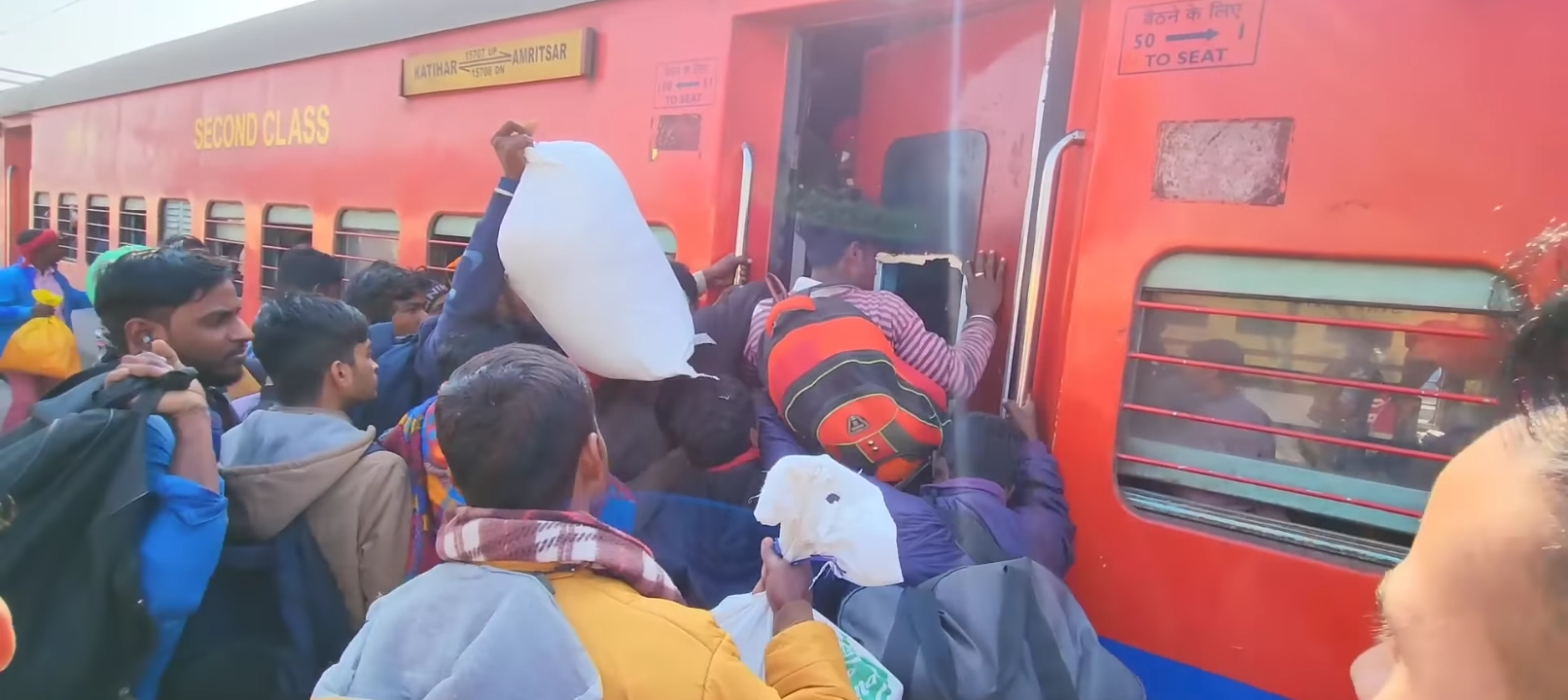
Heavy Rush On Amrapali Express At Sirhind Junction

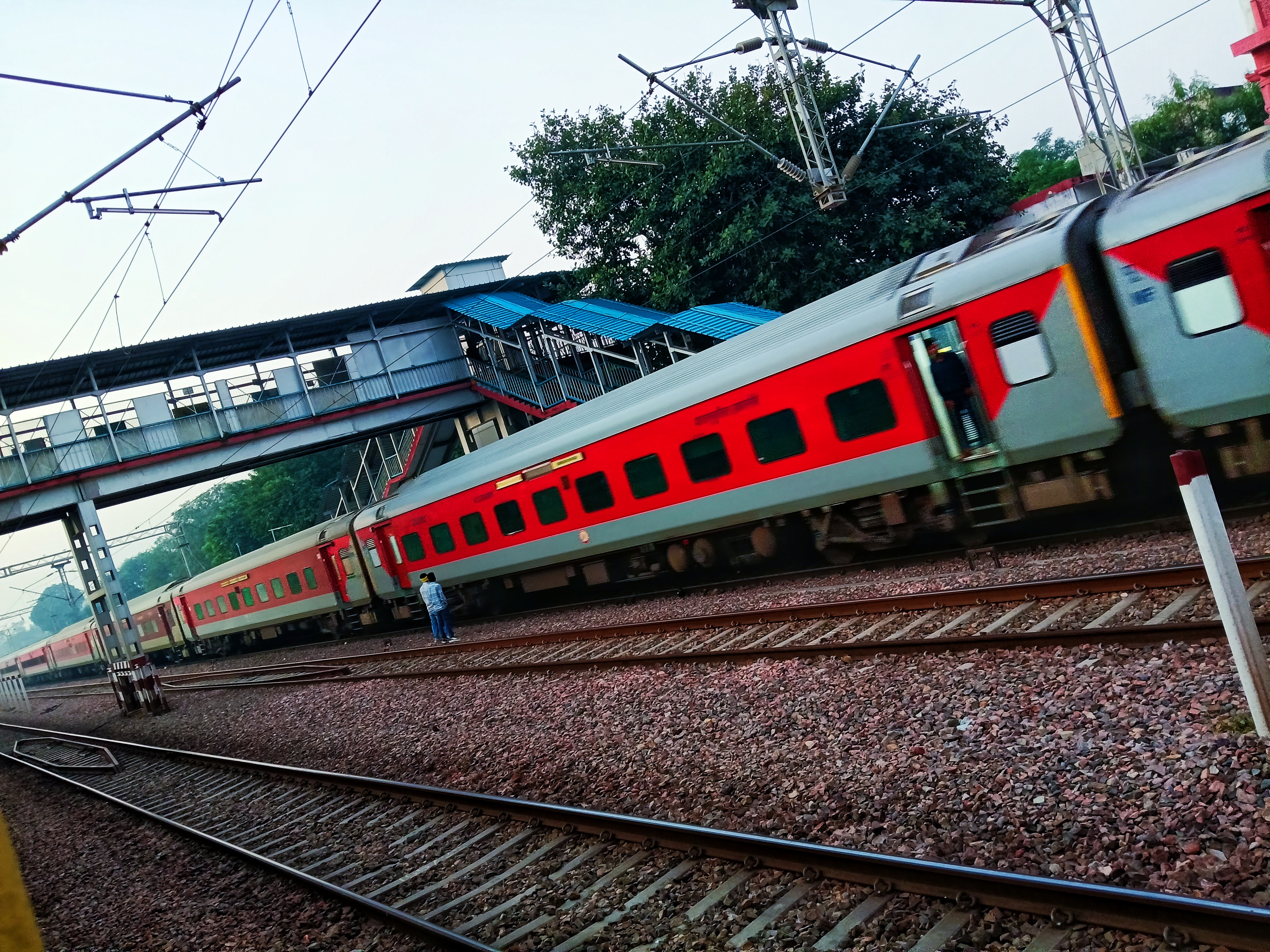
Amrapali Express At Kurukshetra Junction

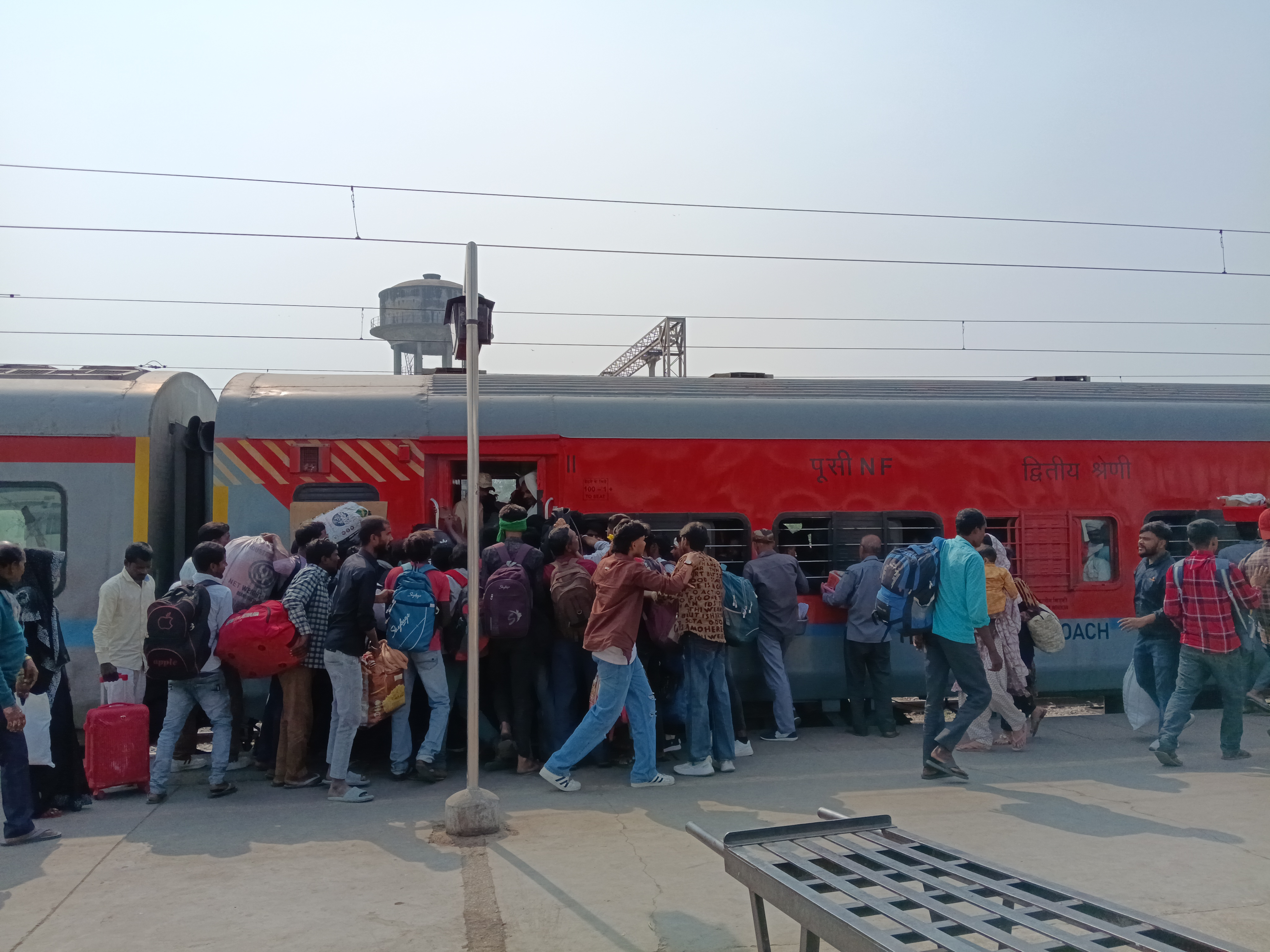
Heavy Rush on Amrapali Express At Ambala Cantt Junction
