= Delhi Junction railway station =

Railway station in Delhi, India

Delhi Junction
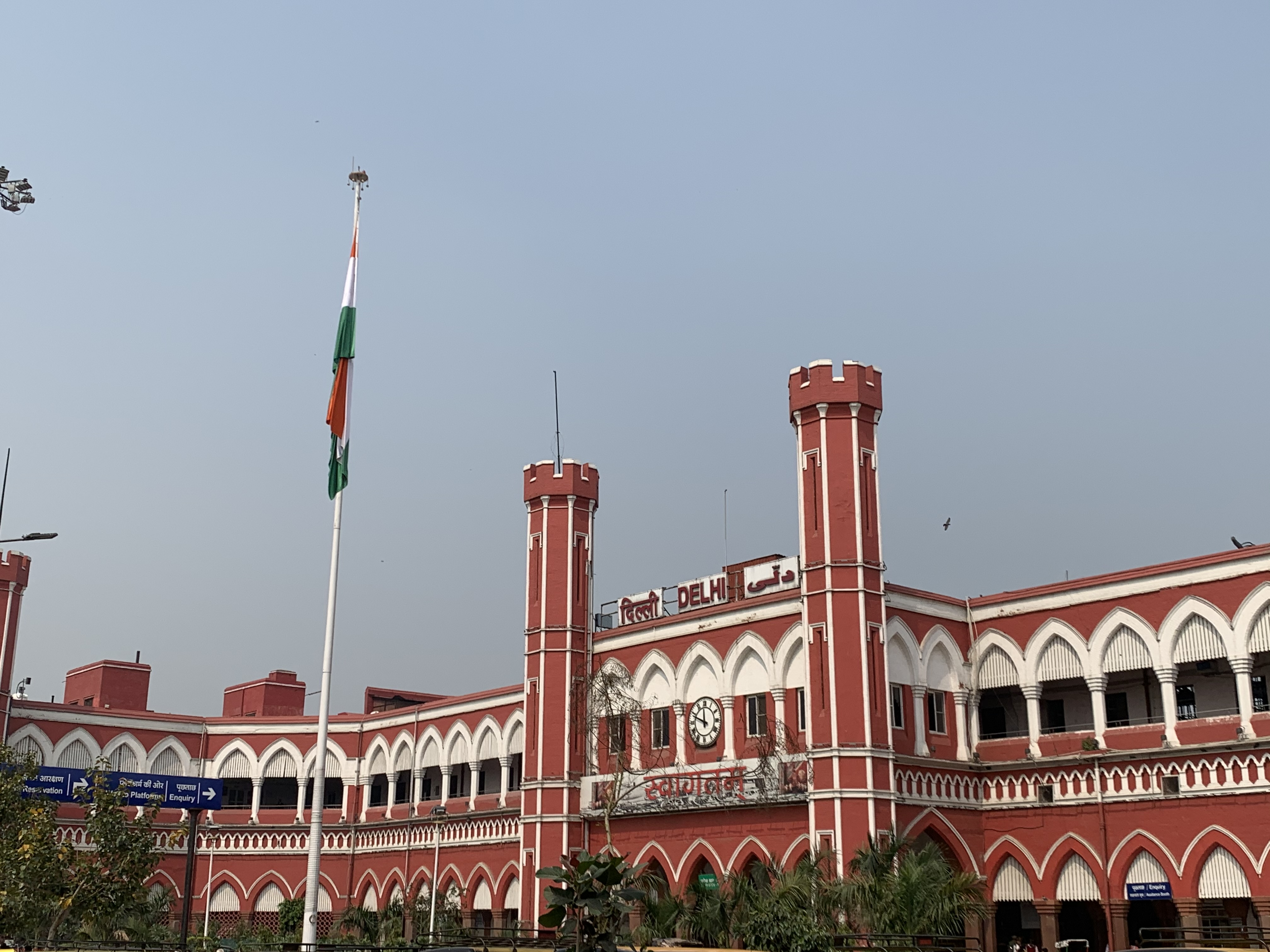

General information
- Other names: Shahjahanabad, Old Delhi/Purani Dilli
- Location: Mori Gate, Old Delhi; India
- Coordinates: 28°39′40″N 77°13′40″E
- Elevation: 218.760 metres (717.72 ft)
- System: Indian Railways Station
- Owner: Ministry of Railways (India)
- Operator: Indian Railways
- Platforms: 16
- Tracks: 18
- Connections: Yellow Line Chandni Chowk

Construction
- Structure type: At grade
- Parking: Yes
- Accessible: Yes

Other information
- Status: Active
- Station code: DLI
- Zone(s): Northern Railway
- Division(s): Delhi

History
- Opened: 1864; 162 years ago
- Rebuilt: 1903; 123 years ago
- Electrified: 1967; 59 years ago
Location
- Interactive map

Delhi Junction railway station (station code: DLI) is the oldest railway station located in Chandni Chowk, Old Delhi, Delhi, India. It is one of the busiest railway stations in the country, with around 250 trains commencing, terminating, or passing through it daily. Established in 1864, it originally served trains arriving from Calcutta.

The current station building, designed in the architectural style of the nearby Red Fort, was constructed by the imperial British government and opened in 1903. Preceding the New Delhi railway station by about 60 years, Delhi Junction has remained a significant hub in India’s railway network. The Chandni Chowk station of the Delhi Metro network is situated nearby, providing seamless connectivity to the city.

== History ==
In 1864, station became operational with a broad-gauge train from Calcutta. In 1873, the Rajputana State Railway laid a metre-gauge track connecting Delhi to Rewari and further to Ajmer, with metre-gauge train services from the station commencing in 1876.

In 1900, the present building of Delhi Junction railway station was constructed in and opened to the public in 1903 with just two platforms and serving around 1,000 passengers. Old Delhi railway station was constructed using red stone to harmonise with the historic Mughal-era Red Fort located nearby. The original station building featured six clock towers, of which Tower 4 remains in use today as a water tank.

In 1904, the Agra–Delhi railway line was inaugurated, establishing Delhi as a critical railway hub connected by six railway systems. The East Indian Railway, North-Western State Railway, and Oudh and Rohilkhand Railway made headways into Delhi from Ghaziabad, crossing the Yamuna River. The Delhi–Panipat–Ambala Cantonment–Kalka Railway extended northwards from Delhi, while the Rajputana–Malwa Railway passed through the Delhi district briefly on its way toward Gurgaon and Rewari Junction.

Until 1926, when New Delhi railway station was built from 1926-1931, the Old Delhi railway station served as the primary railway station of Delhi. The original Agra–Delhi railway line passed through the area later designated for the hexagonal War Memorial (now India Gate) and Kingsway (now Rajpath) as part of New Delhi's city planning. To accommodate this, the East Indian Railway Company realigned the tracks to run along the Yamuna River, completing the new route in 1924.

In 1934–35, the station was remodelled, platforms extended, and power signals were introduced.

In the 1990s, a new entrance was added on the Kashmere Gate side, and additional platforms were constructed. The platforms were renumbered in September 2011, with the sequence starting from the main entrance as Platform 1 and ending at Platform 16 near the Kashmere Gate entrance. Some platforms were merged to form longer platforms capable of accommodating 24-coach trains.

In 1994, it has been exclusively a broad-gauge station, with metre-gauge traffic shifted to Delhi Sarai Rohilla station.

In 2012-13, the station building underwent another renovation.

In 2016, 2.2 MW rooftop solar panels were installed at the station.

== Major trains ==
The train which originates/halts from/at Delhi Junction are :

- Amritsar–Delhi Junction Vande Bharat Express (22488/22489)
- Firozpur Cantonment–Delhi Junction Vande Bharat Express (26461/26462)
- Purnagiri Jan Shatabdi Express (12035/12036)
- Siddhabali Jan Shatabdi Express (12037/12038)
- Kaifiyat Express (12235/12236)
- Delhi–Sri Ganganagar Intercity Express (12481/12482)
- Ashram Express (12915/12916)
- Gaya–Delhi Junction Amrit Bharat Express (13697/13698)
- Mussoorie Express (14041/14042)
- Sitamarhi–Delhi Junction Amrit Bharat Express (14047/14048)
- Himachal Express (14053/14054)
- Padmavat Express (14207/14208)
- Delhi–Fazilka Intercity Express (14507/14508)
- Delhi–Ambala Cantonment Intercity Express (14521/14522)
- Jalandhar City–Delhi Intercity Express (14681/14682)
- Kisan Express (14731/14732)
- Uttarakhand Sampark Kranti Express (15035/15036)
- Loknayak Express (15115/15116)
- Sikkim Mahananda Express (15483/15484)
- Brahmaputra Mail (15657/15658)
- Champaran Humsafar Express (15705/15706)
- Delhi–Pathankot Superfast Express (22429/22430)
- Mandore Express (22995/22996)
- Udaipur City–New Jalpaiguri Weekly Express (19601/19602)
- Kamakhya–Rohtak Amrit Bharat Express (15671/15672)
- Udaipur City–Yog Nagari Rishikesh Express (19609/19610)
- Amrapali Express (15707/15708)
- Daurai–Tanakpur Express(15091/15092)
- Pooja Superfast Express (12413/12414)
- Unchahar Express (14217/14218)
- Jammu Mail (20433/20434)
- Corbett Park Link Express (25013/25014)
- Ranikhet Express (15013/15014)
- Bhagat Ki Kothi–Kamakhya Express (15623/15624)
- Yoga Express (19031/19032)
- Kalindi Express (14723/14724)
- Netaji Express (12311/12312)
- Farakka Express (via Ayodhya Cantt) (15743/15744
- Muri Express (18101/18102)
- Avadh Assam Express (15909/15910)
- Mussoorie Express (14041/14042)
- Howrah–Barmer Express (12323/12324)
- Delhi–Pathankot Superfast Express (22429/22430)
- Jallianwalla Bagh Express (12379/12380)
- Howrah–Jaisalmer Superfast Express (12371/12372)
- Saharsa–Amritsar Garib Rath Express (12203/12204)

== Facilities ==
The station has eighteen platforms, two of which are designed to accommodate two 24-coach trains end-to-end.

The station is equipped with four pit lines for washing and cleaning trains.

== Junction ==
Railway lines from five routes converge at Delhi Junction:

- Delhi Shahdara Junction towards Ghaziabad and Saharanpur
- Sadar Bazar towards New Delhi
- Delhi Kishanganj towards Rohtak
- Subzi Mandi towards Ambala
- Sarai Rohilla towards Rewari

== Last mile connectivity ==
Delhi Metro's nearest station, Chandni Chowk metro station, is connected with the Delhi railway station with underground walkways.

== Gallery ==
Delhi Junction as viewed from a bridge

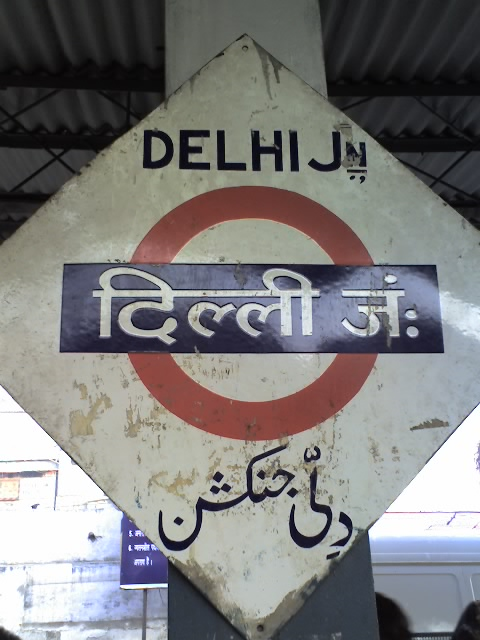
Old Delhi signage

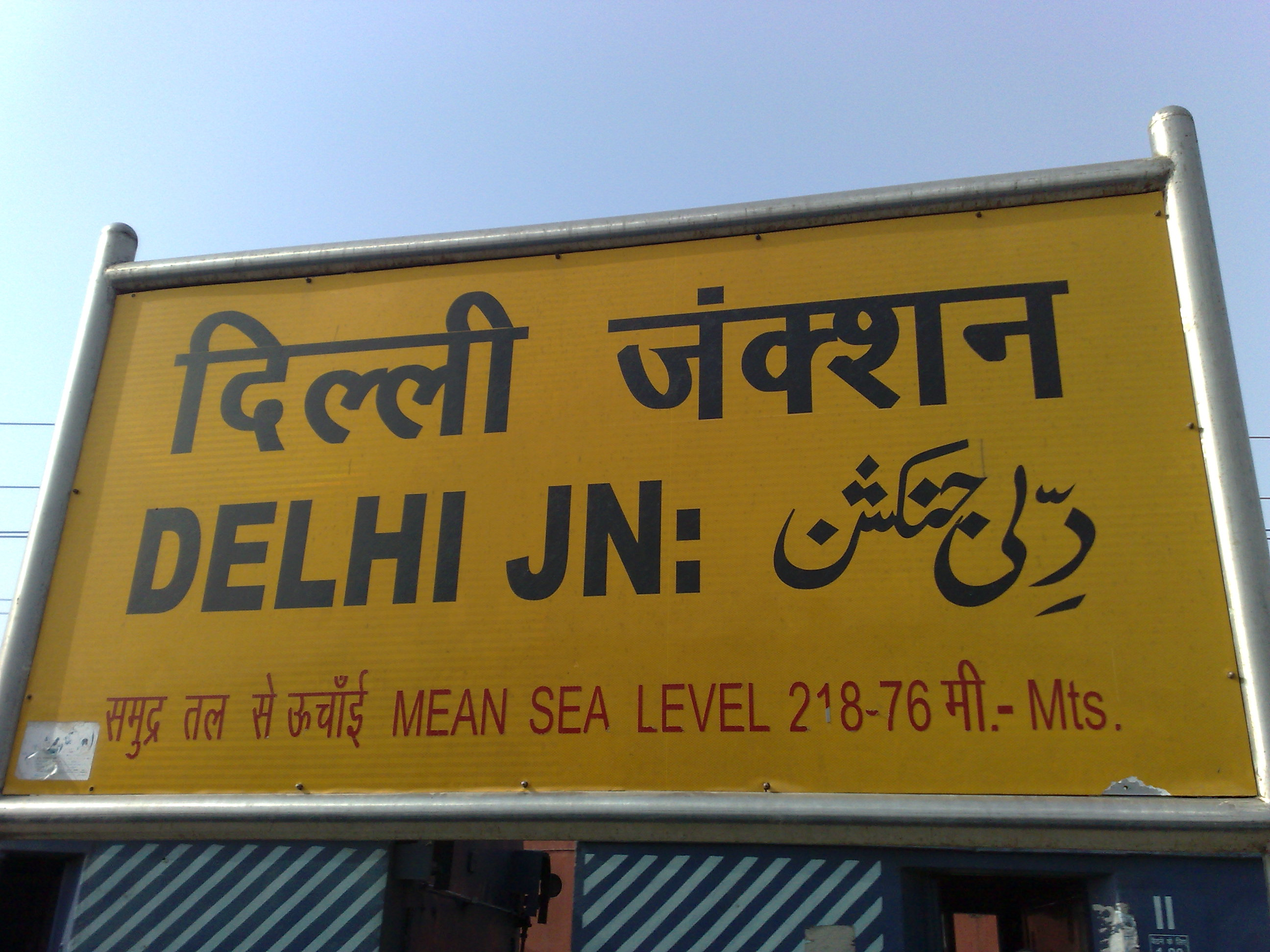
Old Delhi railway station

== See also ==
- New Delhi
- Delhi Sarai Rohilla
- Hazrat Nizamuddin
- Anand Vihar Terminal railway station
- Shakurbasti railway station
- Delhi Metro
