= Motichur railway station =

Railway Station in Uttarakhand

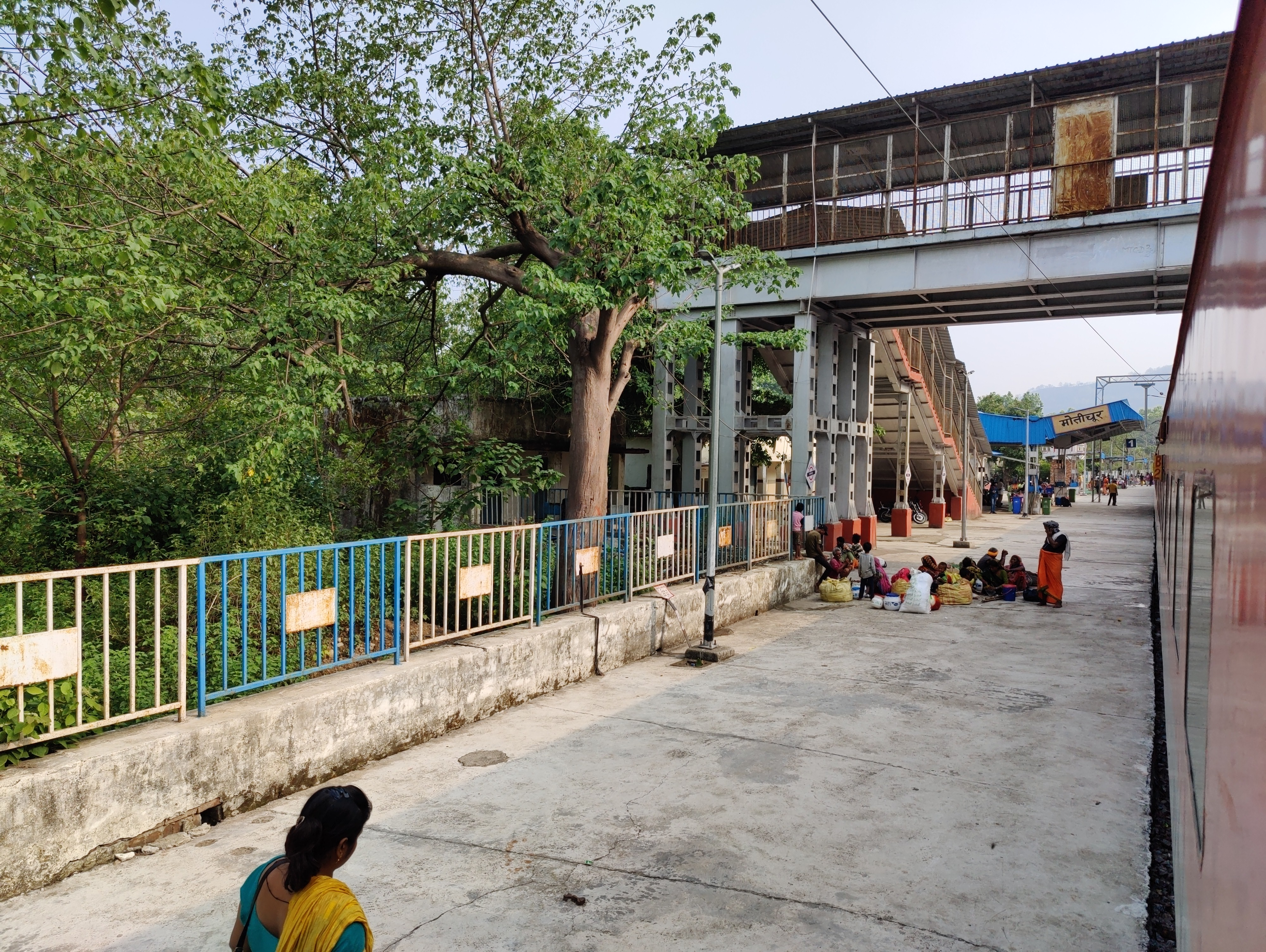
- Motichur railway station

General information
- Location: Bhupatwala, Motichur, Haridwar; India
- Coordinates: 29.9807°N 78.1775°E
- Elevation: 312.95 metres (1,026.7 ft)
- System: Indian Railway
- Owner: Indian Railways
- Operator: Northern Railway
- Platforms: 3
- Tracks: 2

Construction
- Structure type: Standard on ground
- Parking: Yes
- Cycle facilities: Yes

Other information
- Status: Functioning
- Station code: MOTC
- Zone(s): Northern Railway
- Division(s): Moradabad
Location

Motichur railway station lies on the Northern railway network of Indian Railways.

== Location ==
The station is situated in Bhupatwala, Haridwar, Uttarakhand, India. The road distance between Motichur railway station and Haridwar Junction railway station is 5 km.

== Reduced level ==
The RL of the station is 313.95 m above mean sea level.

== Signage ==
The station signage are predominantly in English and Hindi.

== See also ==
- Rishikesh
