= Kota–Shri Mata Vaishno Devi Katra Weekly Express =

Train in India

Overview
- Service type: Express
- First service: 11 January 2014; 11 years ago (initial service); 5 September 2015; 9 years ago (extended to Shri Mata Vaishno Devi Katra)
- Current operator(s): West Central Railway

Route
- Termini: Kota (KOTA); SMVD Katra (SVDK)
- Stops: 28
- Distance travelled: 1,136 km (706 mi)
- Average journey time: 24 hrs 50 mins
- Service frequency: Weekly (Note: Runs one day in a week for every direction.)
- Train number(s): 19803 / 19804

On-board services
- Class(es): AC 2 tier, AC 3 tier, Sleeper class, General Unreserved
- Seating arrangements: No
- Sleeping arrangements: Yes
- Catering facilities: On-board catering, E-catering
- Observation facilities: Large windows
- Baggage facilities: No
- Other facilities: Below the seats

Technical
- Rolling stock: LHB coach
- Track gauge: 1,676 mm (5 ft 6 in)
- Operating speed: 46 km/h (29 mph) average including halts.

The 19803 / 19804 Kota–Shri Mata Vaishno Devi Katra Weekly Express is an Express train belonging to West Central Railway zone that runs between Kota Junction and Shri Mata Vaishno Devi Katra in India. It is currently being operated with 19803/19804 train numbers on a weekly basis.

== Service ==
The 19803/Kota–Katra Weekly Express has an average speed of 46 km/h and covers 1136 km in 24h 50m. The 19804/Katra–Kota Weekly Express has an average speed of 44 km/h and covers 1881 km in 25h 50m.

== Route and halts ==
The important halts of the train are :

- Kota Junction
- Sawai Madhopur Junction
- Bharatpur Junction
- Mathura Junction
- Faridabad
- Hazrat Nizamuddin
- New Delhi
- Rohtak Junction
- Jind Junction
- Narwana Junction
- Jakhal Junction
- Sangrur
- Ludhiana Junction
- Ludhiana Junction
- Jalandhar Cantonment Junction
- Pathankot Cantonment
- Kathua
- Jammu Tawi
- Udhampur
- Shri Mata Vaishno Devi Katra

== Coach composition ==
The train has standard LHB rakes with a maximum speed of 110 km/h. The train consists of 19 coaches:

- 1 AC II Tier
- 3 AC III Tier
- 6 Sleeper coaches
- 6 General Unreserved
- 2 Seating cum Luggage Rake
- 1 High Capacity Parcel Van

== Traction ==
Both trains are hauled by an Electric Loco Shed, Tuglakabad based WAP-7 throughout the entire journey.

== Rake sharing ==
The train shares its rake with 19805/19806 Kota–Udhampur Weekly Express.

== See also ==
- Kota Junction railway station
- Shri Mata Vaishno Devi Katra railway station
- Kota–Udhampur Weekly Express
