= New Delhi–Amritsar Swarna Shatabdi Express =

Shatabdi Express train in India

New Delhi - Amritsar Jn Swarna Shatabdi Express
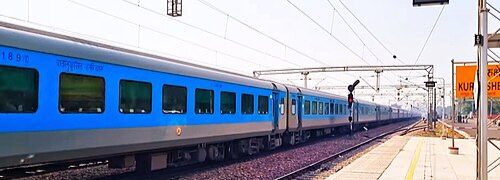
- New Delhi - Amritsar Swarna Shatabdi Express At Kurukshetra Junction railway station

Overview
- Service type: Superfast Express, Shatabdi Express
- Locale: Punjab, Haryana & Delhi
- Current operator: Northern Railway zone

Route
- Termini: New Delhi; Amritsar Junction
- Stops: 6
- Distance travelled: 448 km (278 mi)
- Average journey time: 6 hours
- Service frequency: 6 days a week except Thursday.
- Train number: 12029 / 12030

On-board services
- Classes: Executive Class, AC Chair Car
- Seating arrangements: Yes
- Sleeping arrangements: No
- Catering facilities: Yes
- Observation facilities: Large Windows
- Baggage facilities: Overhead racks

Technical
- Rolling stock: IRY/IR20 Coaches (earlier), LHB coach
- Track gauge: 1,676 mm (5 ft 6 in)
- Operating speed: 70 km/h (43 mph) Average, maximum permissible 130 kmph between New Delhi and Ludhiana - increasing of 110 kmph to 130 kmph is under process between Ludhiana and Amritsar.

The 12029/30 New Delhi Amritsar Swarna Shatabdi Express is a Superfast Express train of the Shatabdi category belonging to Indian Railways - Northern Railway zone that runs between New Delhi and Amritsar in India.

It operates as train number 12029 from New Delhi to Amritsar Junction and as train number 12030 in the reverse direction serving the states of Delhi, Haryana & Punjab.

== Coaches ==
The 12029 / 30 New Delhi Amritsar Swarna Shatabdi Express has 3 Executive Class, 14 AC Chair Car & 2 End on Generator coaches. It does not carry a Pantry car coach but being a Shatabdi category train catering is arranged on board the train.

As is customary with most train services in India, Coach Composition may be amended at the discretion of Indian Railways depending on demand.

	1	2	3	4	5	6	7	8	9	10	11	12	13	14	15	16	17	18	19	20
12029		EOG	C1	C2	C3	C4	C5	C6	C7	C8	C9	C10	C11	C12	C13	C14	E1	E2	E3	EOG
12030		EOG	E3	E2	E1	C14	C13	C12	C11	C10	C9	C8	C7	C6	C5	C4	C3	C2	C1	EOG

== Service ==
The 12029 New Delhi Amritsar Swarna Shatabdi Express covers the distance of 448 kilometres in 6 hours 20 mins (71.68 km/h) and in 6 hours 15 mins as 12030 Amritsar New Delhi Swarna Shatabdi Express (72.65 km/h).

As the average speed of the train is above 55 km/h (34 mph), as per Indian Railways rules, its fare includes a superfast surcharge.

== Speed ==
The maximum permissible speed is 130 kmph between New Delhi and Ludhiana. Increasing of maximum permissible speed from 110 to kmph to 130 kmph is under process between Ludhiana and Amritsar.

== Routing ==
The 12029 / 30 New Delhi Amritsar Swarna Shatabdi Express runs from New Delhi via Ambala Cantonment, Rajpura Junction, Ludhiana Junction, Phagwara Junction, Jalandhar City, Beas Junction to Amritsar Junction.

== Traction ==
As the entire route is fully electrified, a Ghaziabad based WAP 5 or WAP 7 powers the train for its entire journey.

== Arrest ==
On 16 March 2017, the train was arrested by a court order.

== Timings ==
NDLS - ASR - NDLS Shatabdi Express
12029		Stations	12030	
Arrival	Departure	Stations	Arrival	Departure
----	07:20	New Delhi	22:50	----
09:41	09:43	Ambala Cantt. Junction	20:26	20:30
10:02	10:04	Rajpura Junction	19:52	19:54
11:08	11:11	Ludhiana Junction	18:50	18:55
11:40	11:42	Phagwara Junction	18:14	18:16
12:06	12:08	Jalandhar City Junction	17:53	17:56
12:38	12:40	Beas Junction	17:18	17:20
13:30	----	Amritsar Junction	----	16:50
