= Ajmer–Chandigarh Garib Rath Express =

Train in India

Ajmer Junction - Chandigarh Junction Garib Rath Express
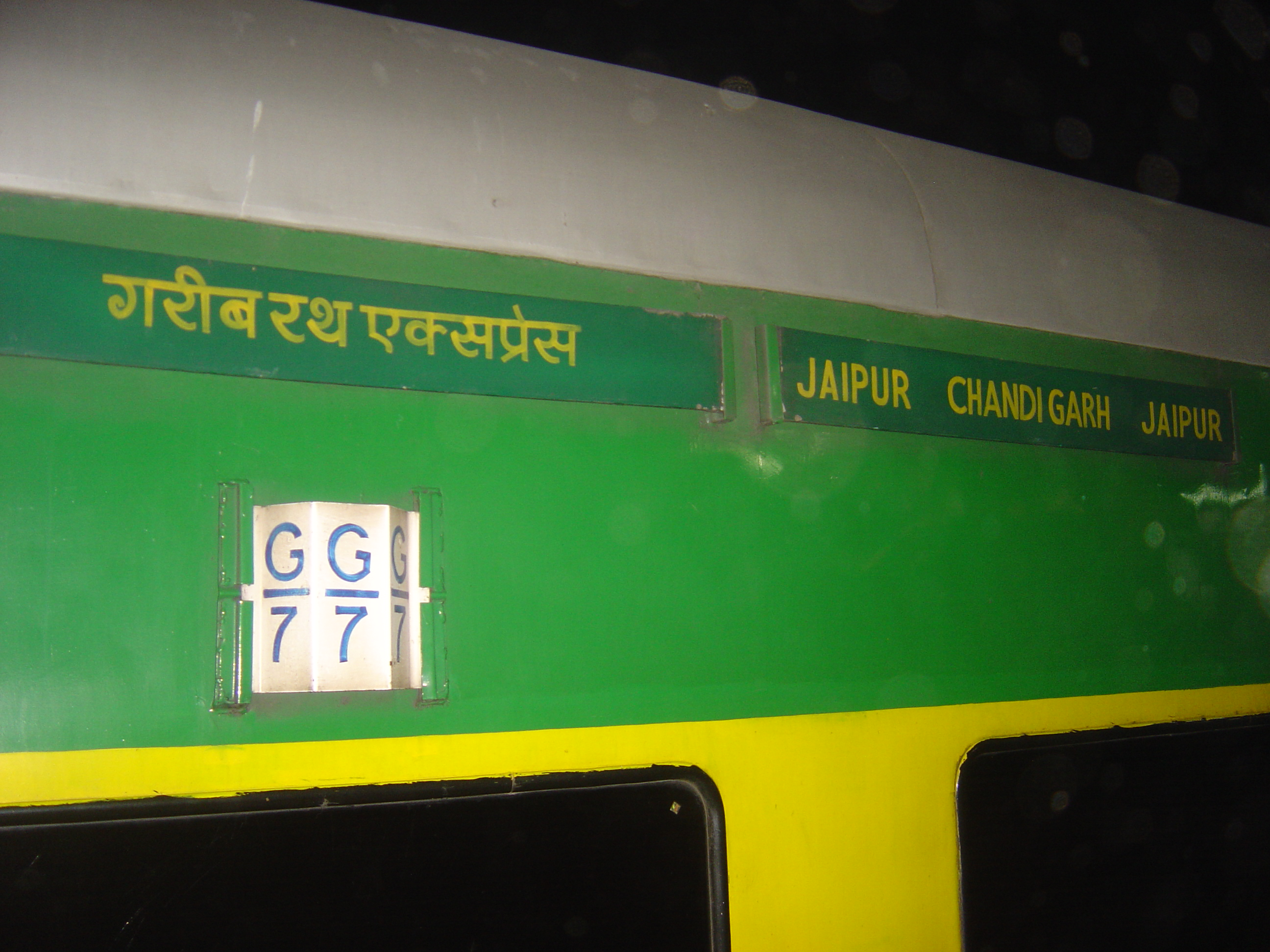

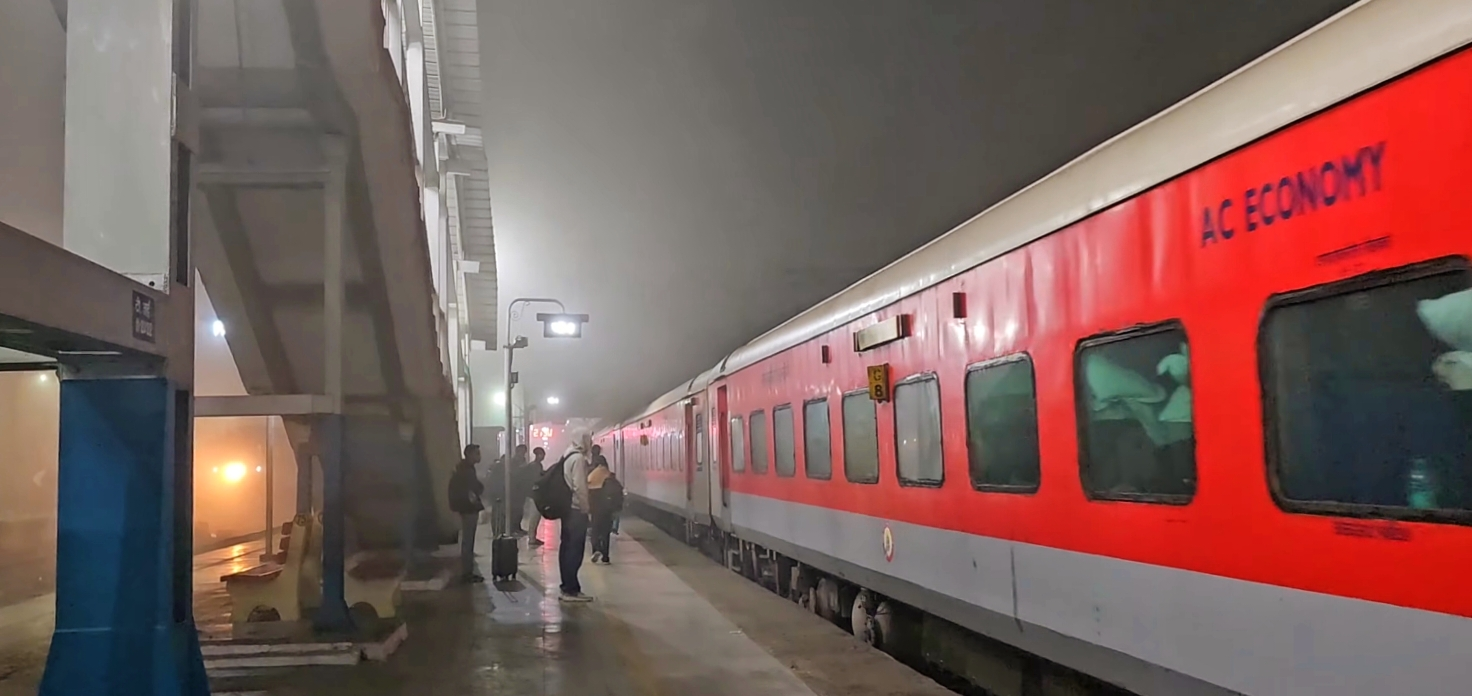
- Ajmer Junction - Chandigarh Junction Garib Rath Express At Kurukshetra Junction railway station

Overview
- Service type: Garib Rath Express
- Locale: Rajasthan, Haryana, Chandigarh
- First service: 14 February 2009
- Current operator: North Western Railways

Route
- Termini: Ajmer Junction; Chandigarh
- Stops: 14
- Distance travelled: 740 km (460 mi)
- Average journey time: 12 hours 50 minutes as 12983 Ajmer–Chandigarh Express, 12 hours 30 minutes as 12984 Chandigarh–Ajmer Express
- Service frequency: 3 days a week. 12983 Ajmer–Chandigarh Express – Tuesday, Friday, Sunday. 12984 Chandigarh–Ajmer Express – Monday, Wednesday, Saturday.
- Train number: 12983 / 12984

On-board services
- Class: AC 3 tier only
- Seating arrangements: No
- Sleeping arrangements: Yes
- Catering facilities: No pantry car attached
- Observation facilities: No rake sharing

Technical
- Rolling stock: Standard Indian Railways coaches
- Track gauge: 1,676 mm (5 ft 6 in)
- Operating speed: 110 km/h (68 mph) maximum 57 km/h (35 mph), including halts

The 12983/84 Ajmer–Chandigarh Garib Express is a Superfast Express train of Garib Rath class belonging to Indian Railways – North Western Railways zone that runs between Ajmer Junction and Chandigarh Junction in India.It is the only Garib Rath Express of North Western Railways of Indian Railways.

It operates as train number 12983 from Ajmer to Chandigarh and as train number 12984 in the reverse direction.

On introduction, it would run between Jaipur & Chandigarh. Later it was extended to Ajmer.

== Coaches ==
The 12983/84 Ajmer–Chandigarh Garib Express presently has 12 AC 3 tier coaches along with 2 EOG cars.

As with most train services in India, coach composition may be amended at the discretion of Indian Railways depending on demand.

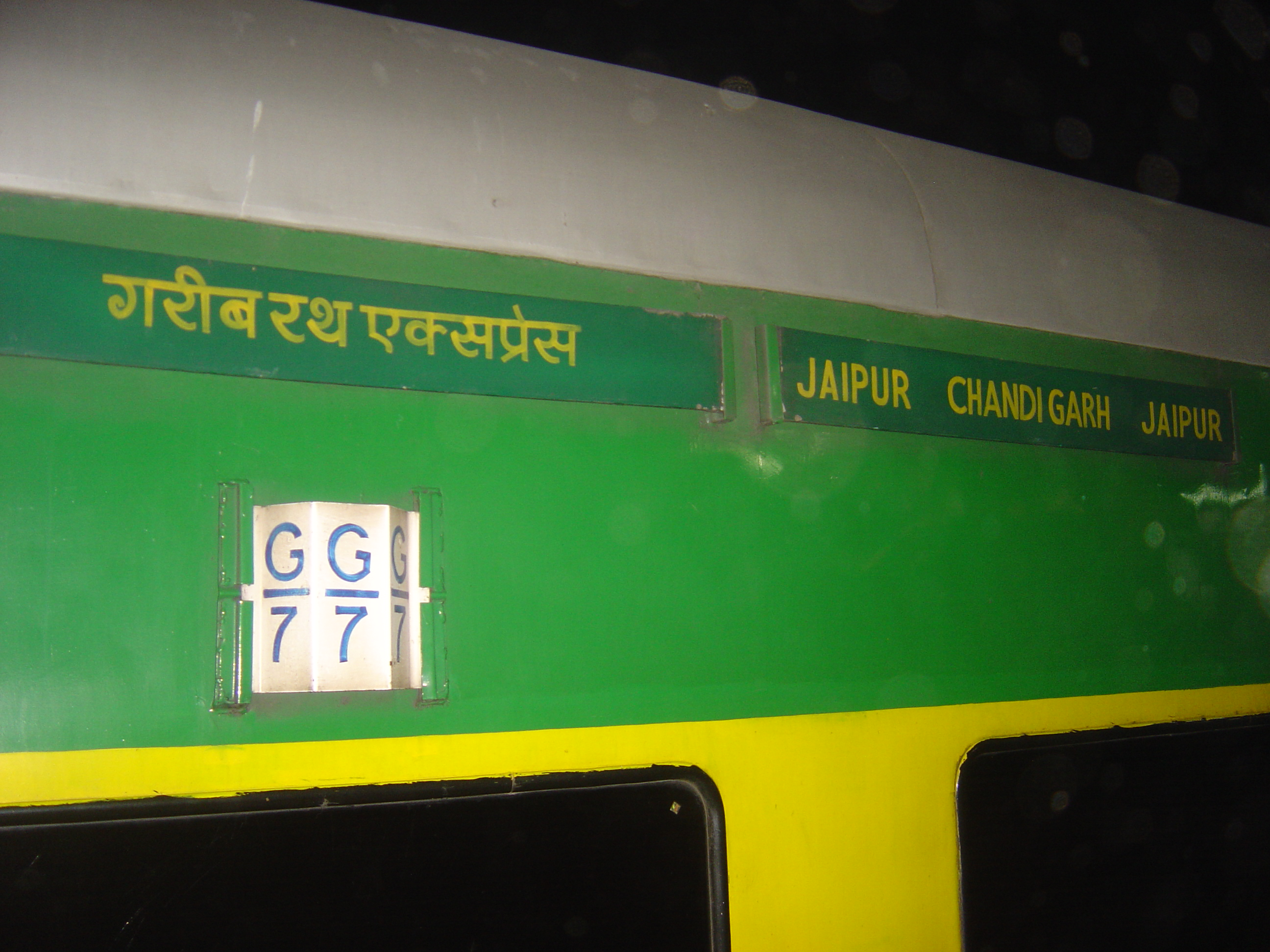
Jaipur/Ajmer–Chandigarh Garib Rath Express – AC 3 tier coach

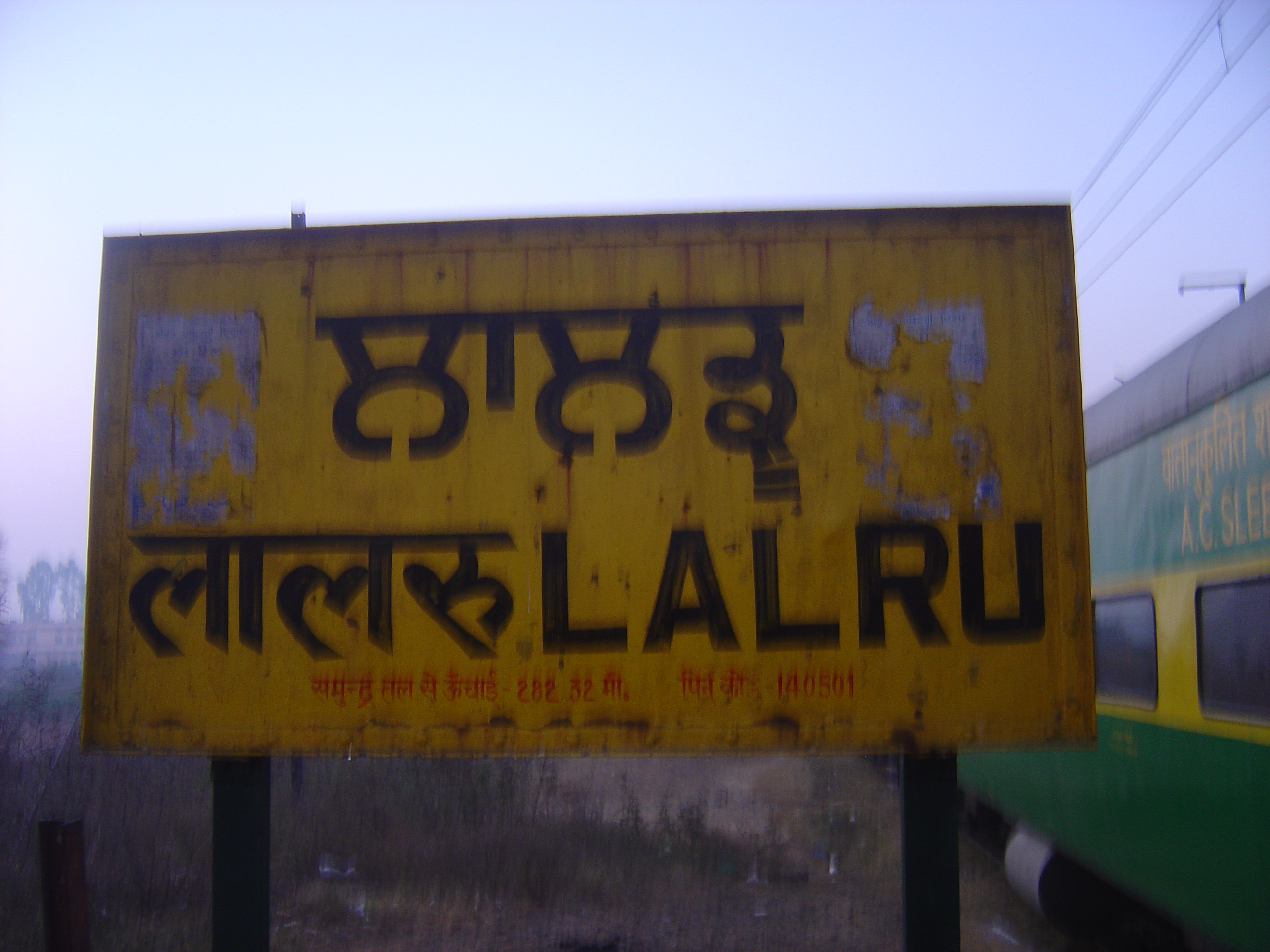
Jaipur/Ajmer–Chandigarh Garib Rath Express at Lalru station

== Service ==
The 12983 Ajmer–Chandigarh Garib Express covers the distance of 740 kilometres in 12 hours 50 mins (57.66 km/h) & in 12 hrs 30 mins as 12984 Chandigarh–Ajmer Garib Express (59.20 km/h).

As the average speed of the train is above 55 km/h, as per Indian Railways rules, its fare includes a Superfast surcharge.

== Routeing ==
The 12983/84 Ajmer–Chandigarh Garib Express runs via Jaipur, Alwar, Bhiwani, Rohtak, Panipat Junction, Ambala Cantonment to Chandigarh.

== Traction ==
As the entire route was not yet electrified, a Abu Road-based WDM-3A engine powers the train for its entire journey in the past.But now it is hauled by a Ghaziabad Loco Shed-based WAP-5 engine powers the train for its entire journey as entire route is electrified since 8 March 2022.

== Time table ==
12983 Ajmer–Chandigarh Garib Express leaves Ajmer every Tuesday, Friday & Sunday at 17:55 hrs IST and reaches Chandigarh at 06:45 hrs IST the next day.

12984 Chandigarh–Ajmer Garib Express leaves Chandigarh every Monday, Wednesday & Saturday at 21:10 hrs IST and reaches Ajmer at 09:40 hrs IST the next day.
