= Dr. Ambedkar Nagar–New Delhi Superfast Express =

Train in India

Dr. Ambedkar Nagar - New Delhi Superfast Express
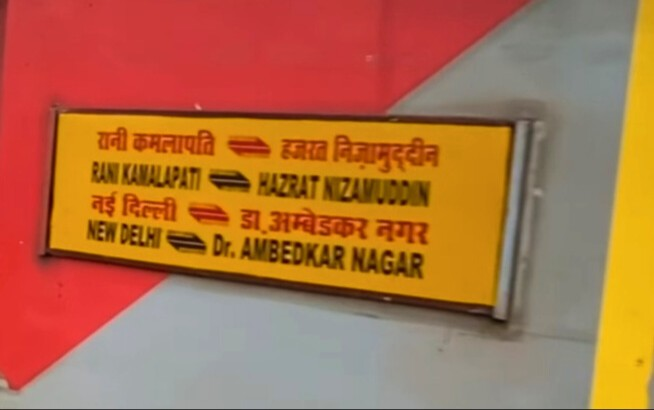

Overview
- Service type: Superfast
- Status: Active
- Locale: Madhya Pradesh, Rajasthan, Uttar Pradesh & New Delhi
- First service: 14 April 2025; 12 months ago
- Current operator: West Central Railway (WCR)

Route
- Termini: Dr. Ambedkar Nagar (DADN); New Delhi (NDLS)
- Stops: 22
- Distance travelled: 847 km (526 mi)
- Average journey time: 12h 55m
- Service frequency: Daily
- Train number: 20155 / 20156

On-board services
- Classes: AC 1st Class, AC 2 tier, AC 3 tier, Sleeper class, General Unreserved
- Seating arrangements: Yes
- Sleeping arrangements: Yes
- Catering facilities: E-catering
- Observation facilities: Large windows
- Baggage facilities: No
- Other facilities: Below the seats

Technical
- Rolling stock: LHB coach
- Track gauge: 1,676 mm (5 ft 6 in)
- Operating speed: 66 km/h (41 mph) average including halts.

The 20155 / 20156 Dr. Ambedkar Nagar–New Delhi Superfast Express is an Superfast express train belonging to West Central railway zone that runs between Dr. Ambedkar Nagar and New Delhi in India.

== Schedule ==
- 20155 - 3:30 PM (Daily) Dr. Ambedkar Nagar
- 20156 - 11:25 PM (Daily) New Delhi

== Routes and halts ==
The Important Halts of the train are :

- Dr. Ambedkar Nagar
- Indore Junction
- Dewas Junction
- Ujjain Junction
- Nagda Junction
- Shamgarh
- Bhawani Mandi
- Ramganj Mandi Junction
- Kota Junction
- Sawai Madhopur Junction
- Gangapur City Junction
- Bayana Junction
- Bharatpur Junction
- Mathura Junction
- Hazrat Nizamuddin
- New Delhi

== Traction ==
As the entire route is fully electrified it is hauled by a Tuglakabad Loco Shed-based WAP-7 electric locomotive from Dr. Ambedkar Nagar to New Delhi and vice versa.

== Rake Reversal/Share ==
The Train will reverse 1 time

1. Nagda Junction

The train will rake sharing with Shaan-e-Bhopal Express (12155/12156).

== See also ==
=== Trains from Dr. Ambedkar Nagar ===
- Rewa–Dr. Ambedkar Nagar Express
- Dr. Ambedkar Nagar–Kamakhya Weekly Express
- Malwa Express
- Dr. Ambedkar Nagar–Bhopal Intercity Express
- Dr. Ambedkar Nagar–Prayagraj Express

=== Trains from New Delhi ===
- Lucknow–New Delhi AC Superfast Express
- New Delhi–Ludhiana Shatabdi Express
- New Delhi–Varanasi Vande Bharat Express
- Sealdah Rajdhani Express
- Uttar Sampark Kranti Express

== Notes ==
a. Runs daily in a week with both directions.
