= Shan-e-Punjab Express =

Superfast Express train running between New Delhi and Amritsar junction

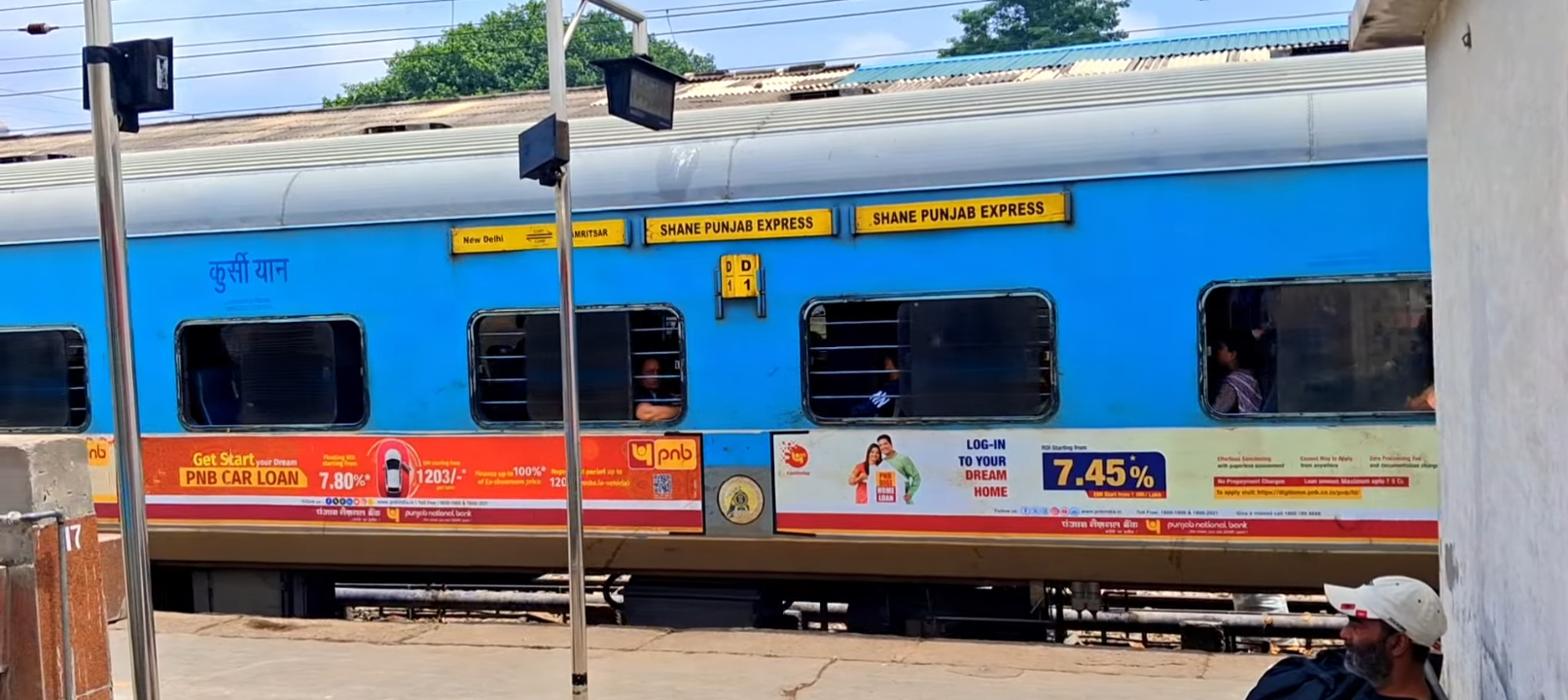
- Shan-e-Punjab Express At Panipat Junction railway station

Overview
- Service type: Superfast Express
- First service: 1 January 1990
- Current operator: Northern Railways

Route
- Termini: New Delhi; Amritsar Junction
- Stops: 10 as 12497 New Delhi–Amritsar Shan-e-Punjab Express, 11 as 12498 Amritsar–New Delhi Shan-e-Punjab Express
- Distance travelled: 448 km (278 mi)
- Average journey time: 7 hours 28 minutes in both directions
- Service frequency: Daily
- Train number: 12497 / 12498

On-board services
- Classes: AC Chair Car, 2nd Class seating, Unreserved/General
- Seating arrangements: Yes
- Sleeping arrangements: No
- Catering facilities: No pantry car attached

Technical
- Rolling stock: LHB coach
- Track gauge: 1,676 mm (5 ft 6 in)
- Operating speed: 130 km/h (81 mph) maximum, 60 km/h (37 mph), including halts

The 12497 / 12498 New Delhi – Amritsar – New Delhi Shan – E – Punjab Express is a Daily Superfast Express train belonging to Indian Railways – Northern Railway zone that runs between New Delhi and Amritsar Junction in India.

It operates as train number 12497 from New Delhi to Amritsar Junction and as train number 12498 in the reverse direction serving the states of Delhi, Haryana and Punjab.

The name Shan-e-Punjab Express translates as the Pride of Punjab.

== Coaches ==
The 12497 / 98 New Delhi–Amritsar Shan-e-Punjab Express has 3 AC Chair Car, 13 2nd Class seating, 2 Unreserved/General and 2 EOG Coaches. It does not carry a pantry car.

As is customary with most train services in India, coach composition may be amended at the discretion of Indian Railways depending on demand.

== Service ==
The 12497 / 98 New Delhi–Amritsar Shan-e-Punjab Express covers the distance of 448 km (278 mi) in 7 hours 40 mins (58.43 km/h) in both directions.

As the average speed of the train is above 55 km/h (34 mph), as per Indian Railways rules, its fare includes a Superfast surcharge.

== Routeing ==
The 12497 / 98 New Delhi–Amritsar Shan-e-Punjab Express runs from New Delhi via Ambala Cant Junction, Ludhiana Junction, Jalandhar City to Amritsar Junction.

== Traction ==
As the route is fully electrified, a Ghaziabad-based WAP-7 locomotive powers the train for its entire journey.

== Timings ==
12497 New Delhi–Amritsar Shan-e-Punjab Express leaves New Delhi on a daily basis at 06:40 hrs IST and reaches Amritsar Junction at 14:15 hrs IST the same day.

12498 Amritsar–New Delhi Shan-e-Punjab Express leaves Amritsar Junction on a daily basis at 15:10 hrs IST and reaches New Delhi at 22:30 hrs IST the same day.
