= Ambala Cantonment Junction railway station =

Railway station in Haryana, India

Ambala Cantonment Junction
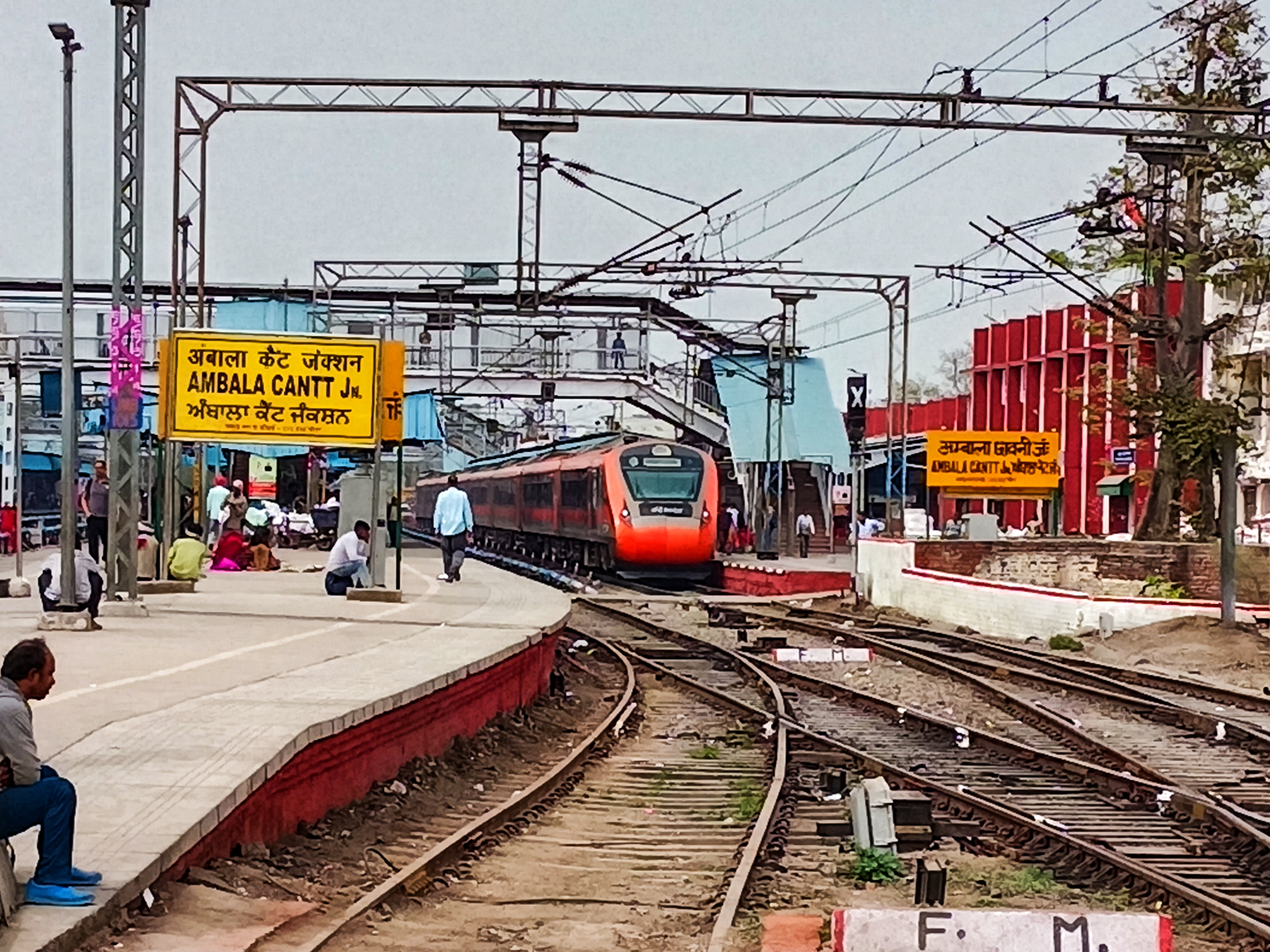
- Ambala Cantonment Junction railway station

General information
- Location: Grand Trunk Road, Ambala Cantonment, Haryana; India
- Coordinates: 30°20′18″N 76°49′43″E
- Elevation: 272.530 metres (894.13 ft)
- System: Indian Railways station
- Owner: Ministry of Railways (India)
- Operator: Indian Railways
- Lines: Delhi-Kalka line, Moradabad–Ambala line, Ambala–Attari line,
- Platforms: 7(plan to expand to 9)
- Tracks: 10

Construction
- Structure type: At grade
- Parking: Yes
- Cycle facilities: No
- Accessible: Available

Other information
- Status: Functioning
- Station code: UMB
- Zone(s): Northern Railway
- Division(s): Ambala

History
- Opened: 1891; 135 years ago
- Electrified: 1999–2000
Location
- Location within Haryana
- Interactive map

Ambala Cantonment Junction railway station (abbreviated as Ambala Cantt)(station code: UMB) is a major junction station at the junction of Delhi–Kalka line and Moradabad–Ambala line cum Ambala–Attari line Ambala–Bathinda line and Ambala–Una Himachal line in India. It is the busiest railway station in the Indian state of Haryana and one of the oldest and busiest in India in terms of frequency of trains.

It is located in the Ambala Cantonment region in Haryana. It serves Ambala Cantonment and Ambala. Around 300 trains start, end, or pass through the station daily. Northern Railways' Ambala railway division is named for the station.

== Gallery ==
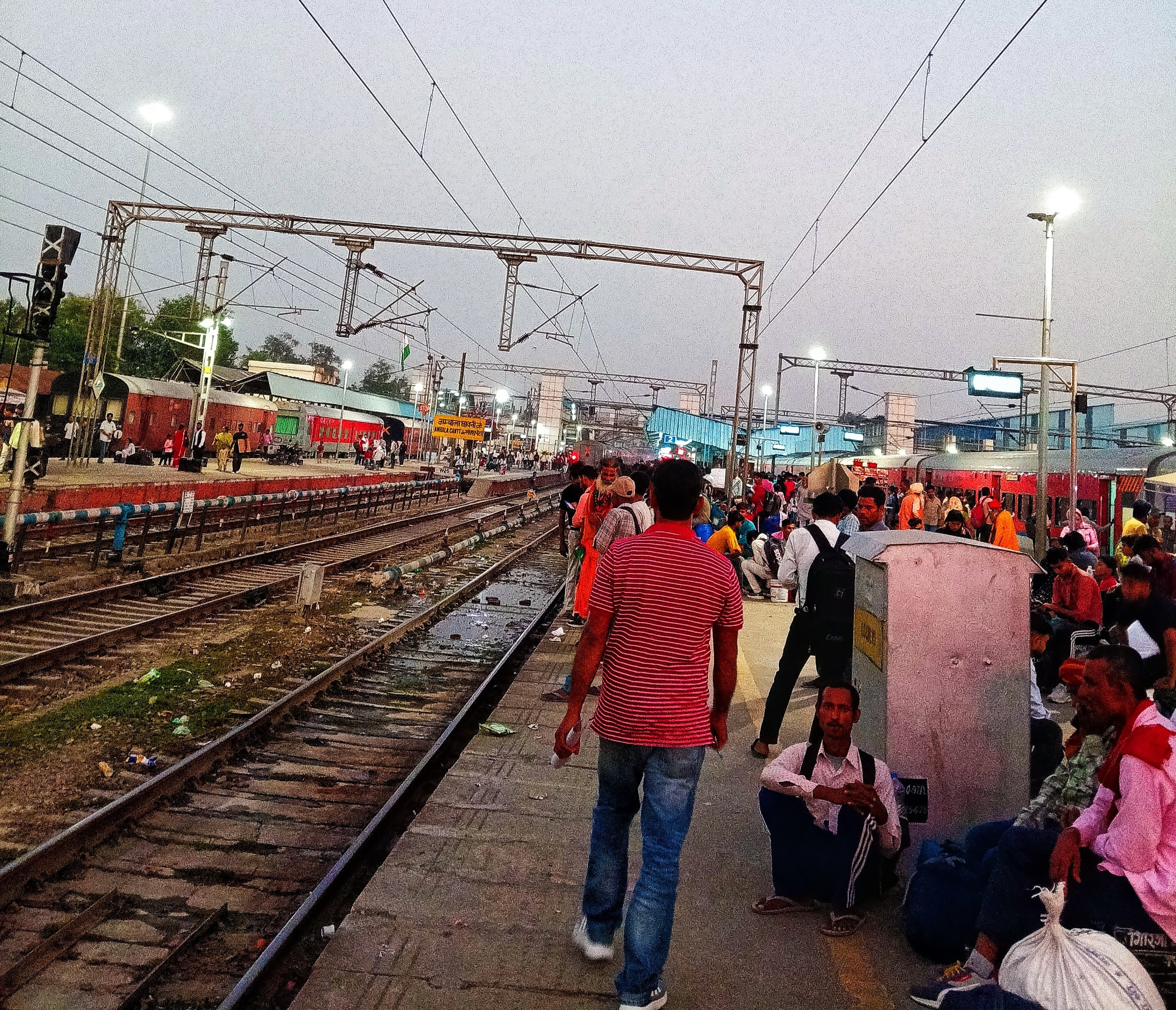
Heavy Rush On Ambala Cantt Junction

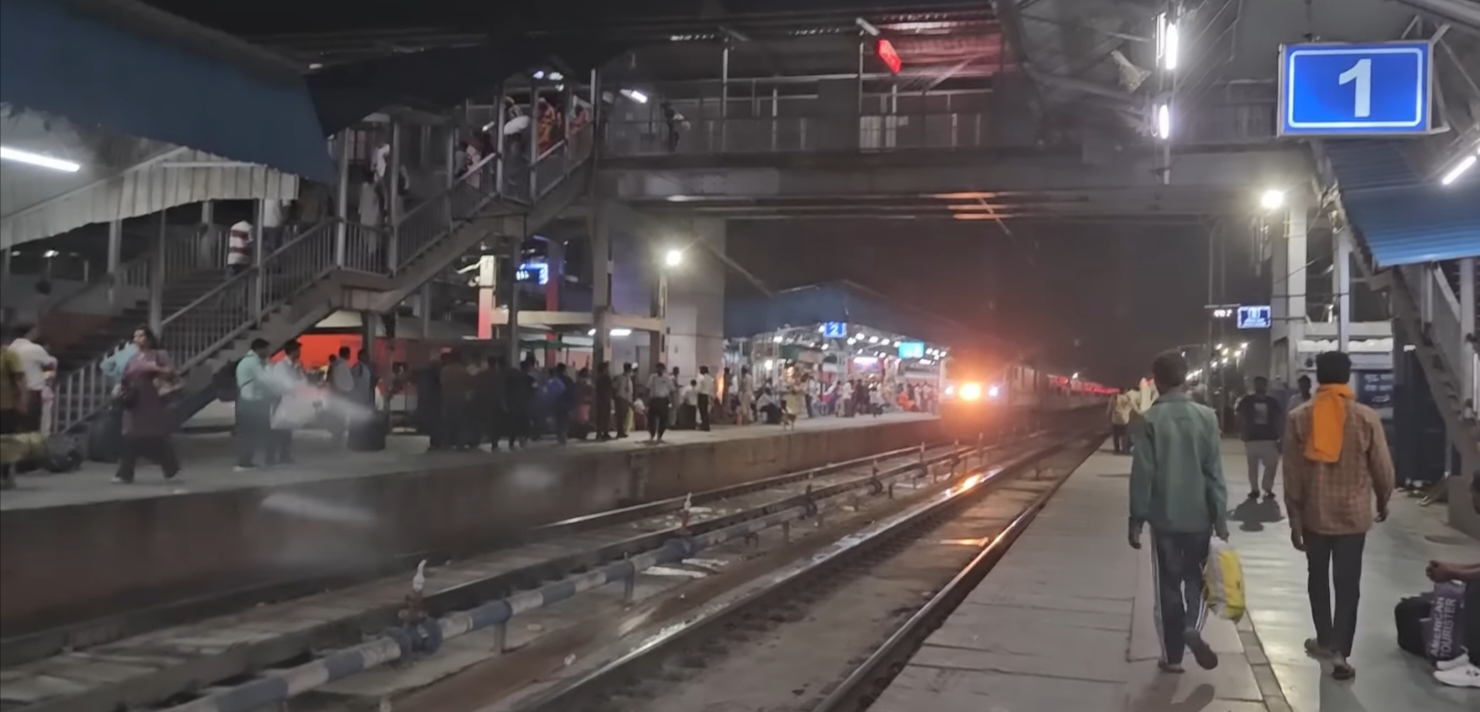
Ambala Cantt Junction platform 1

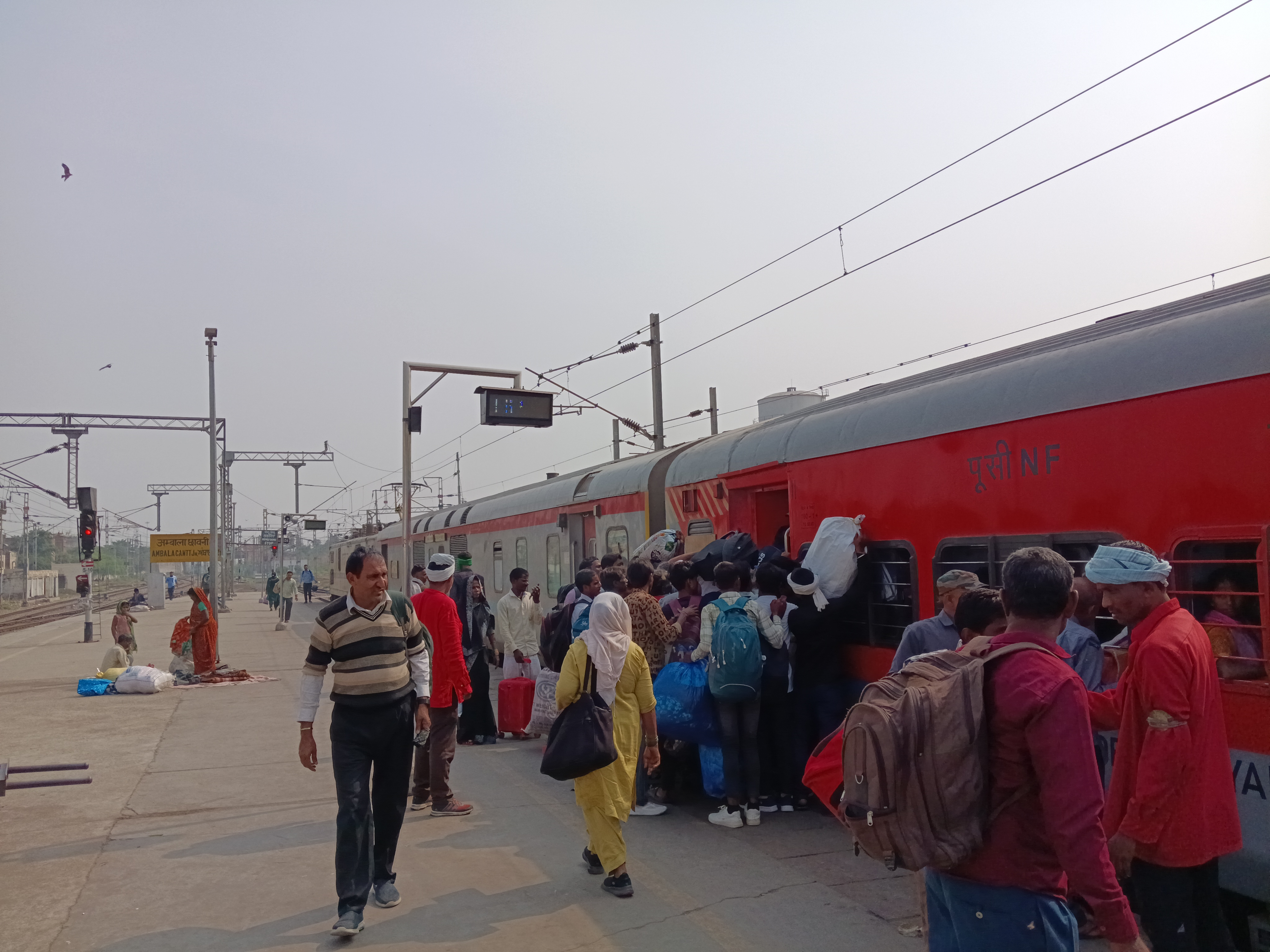
Heavy rush on Amrapali Express At Ambala Cantt Junction

== The railway station ==
Ambala railway station is located at an altitude of 272.530 metres (894.13 ft) above mean sea level. It was allotted the railway code of UMB under the jurisdiction of Ambala railway division. France has joined hands with India to develop Ambala Railway station. French National Railways (SNCF) is carrying out this ambitious project with the help of 7 lakhs Euros in kind grant to be provided by the French development agency AFD.

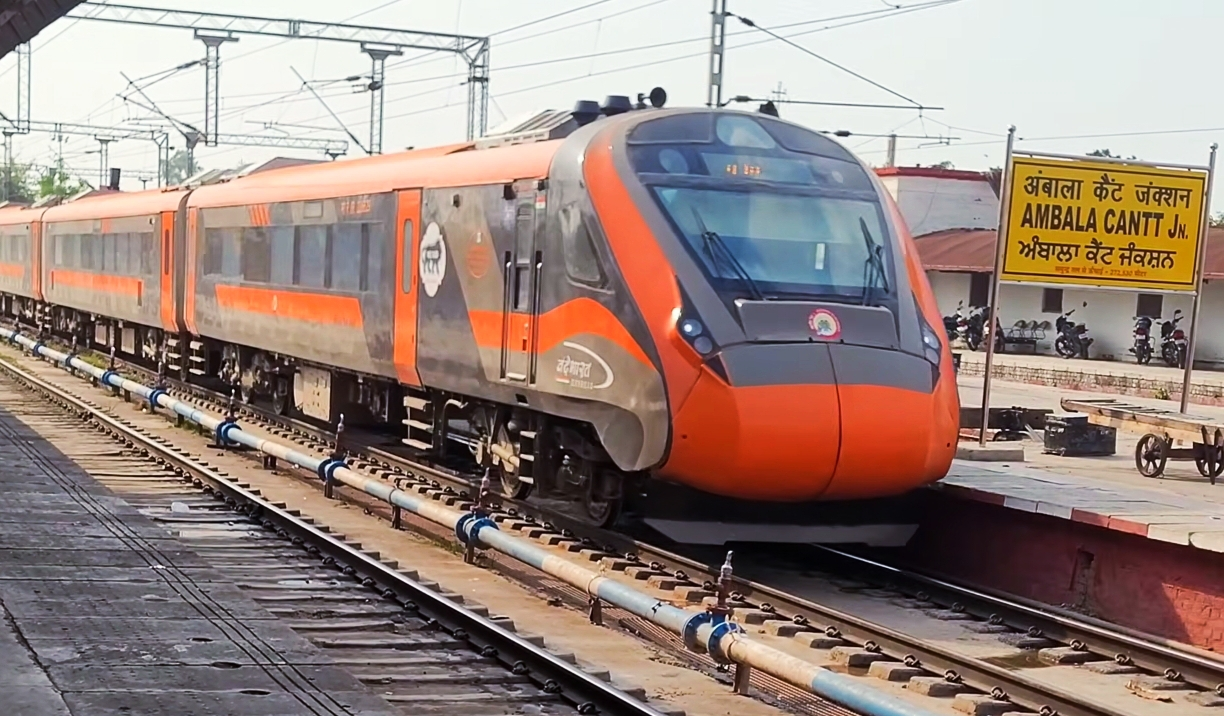
Ambala Cantt Junction – platformboard

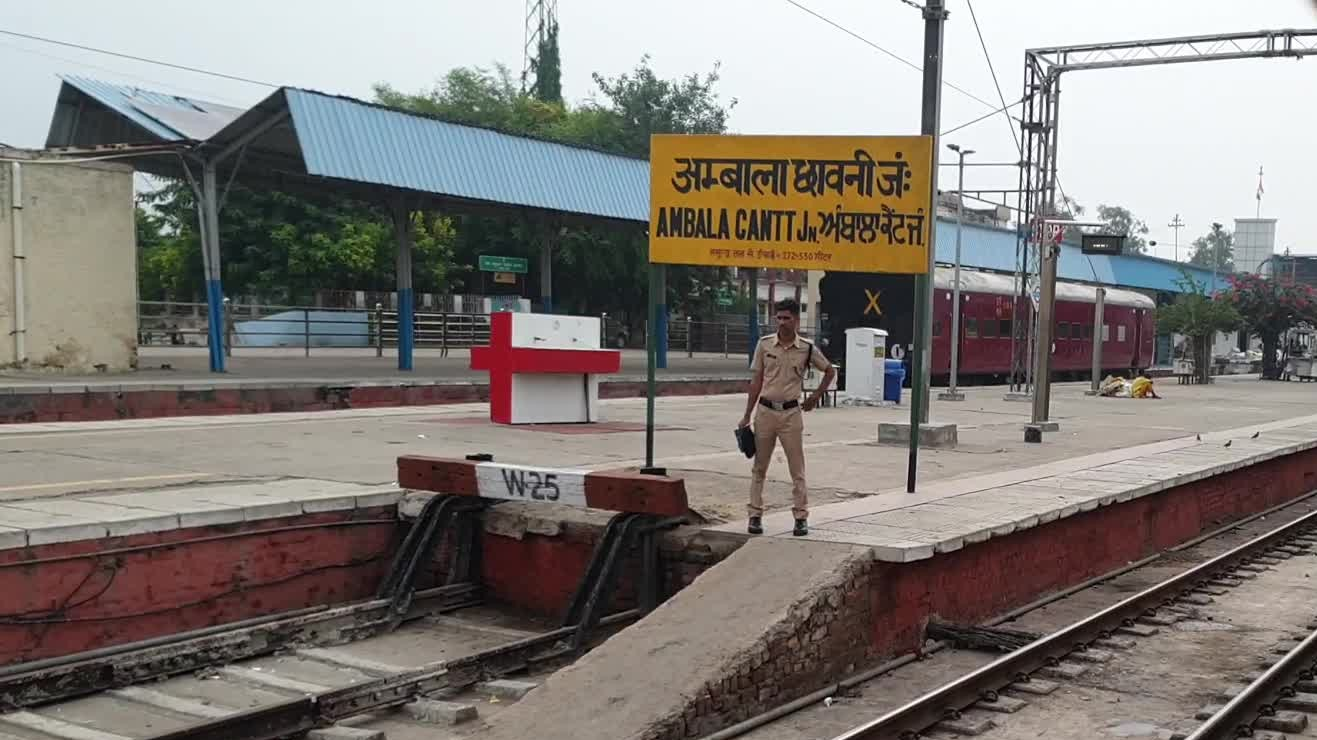
Ambala Cantt Junction railway station board

Ambala Cantt serves most number of Shatabdi Express trains after New Delhi. It handles close about 300 trains on daily basis with 8 platforms.

1. Kalka–New Delhi Shatabdi Express 12005/06
2. Kalka Shatabdi Express 12011/12
3. Chandigarh–New Delhi Shatabdi Express 12045/46
4. Amritsar Shatabdi Express 12013/14
5. New Delhi–Amritsar Swarna Shatabdi Express 12029/30(six days in week)
6. New Delhi–Amritsar Shatabdi Express 12031/32(weekly)

== History ==
The Scinde, Punjab & Delhi Railway completed the 483 km (300 mi)-long Amritsar–Ambala–Saharanpur–Ghaziabad line in 1870 connecting Multan (now in Pakistan) with Delhi.

The Delhi–Panipat–Ambala–Kalka line was opened in 1891.

== Electrification ==
Kurukshetra–Ambala and Ambala–Chandigarh sectors were electrified around 1996–99 and Ambala–Saharanpur sector in 1996–98.

== Loco sheds ==
Ambala has a diesel loco shed for minor maintenance of WDS-4 shunters. The locos are sent to Shakurbasti for major maintenance or repairs.

== Passenger movement ==
Ambala Cantonment is amongst the top hundred booking stations of Indian Railway.

== Trains originating from Ambala Cantonment ==
- Ambala Cantt–Sri Ganganagar Intercity Exp 14525/26
- Ambala Cantt–Barauni Harihar Exp 14523/24
- Ambala Cantt–Delhi Jn. Intercity Exp 14521/22(Via Saharanpur).

== Amenities ==
Ambala Cantonment railway station has one double-bedded AC retiring room and a six-bedded dormitory. It has computerized reservation facility, vegetarian and non-vegetarian refreshment rooms and a book stall. The station is being currently renovated and modernised. Toilets for old-age passengers are being replaced with modern facilities with estimated cost of Rs 45 lakhs. Separate blocks for women, men, children and physically disabled are being constructed by providing all facilities for each category of passengers, and had been awarded to company of national repute and this project should be completed according to the guidelines and rules laid by Railways.

Preceding station	Indian Railways	Following station
Mohri towards ?	Northern Railway zone Delhi–Kalka line	Dhulkot towards ?
Dukheri towards ?	Northern Railway zone Moradabad–Ambala line / Ambala–Attari line	Ambala City towards ?
