= New Delhi–Kalka Shatabdi Express =

Shatabdi Express train route in India

New Delhi-Kalka Shatabdi Express
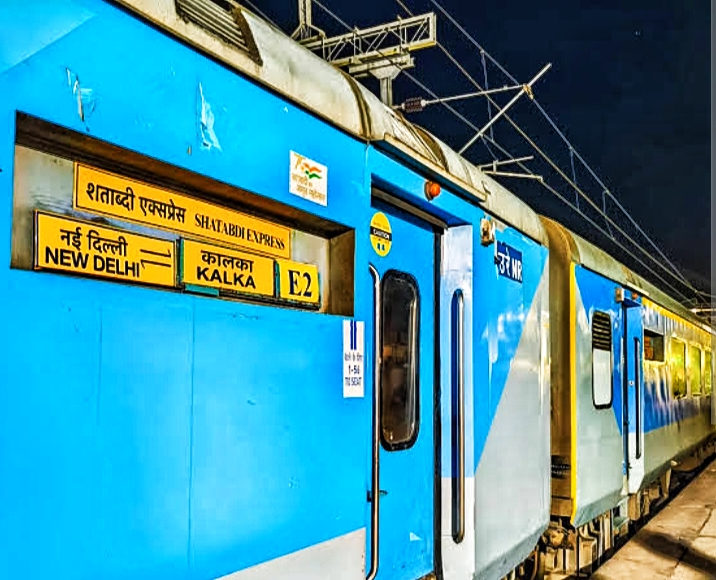
- Shatabdi Express at Panipat Junction railway station

Overview
- Service type: Shatabdi Express
- Status: Operating
- Locale: New Delhi, Haryana & Punjab
- First service: 14 November 1989; 37 years ago
- Current operator: Northern Railways

Route
- Termini: New Delhi railway station (NDLS); Kalka (KLK)
- Stops: 4
- Distance travelled: 269 km (167 mi)
- Average journey time: 4 hrs
- Service frequency: Daily
- Train number: 12005/12006
- Line used: New Delhi–Kalka

On-board services
- Classes: Executive Chair Car, AC Chair Car
- Seating arrangements: Available
- Catering facilities: Available
- Observation facilities: Large Windows
- Baggage facilities: Overhead racks

Technical
- Rolling stock: LHB rakes
- Track gauge: Broad Gauge
- Operating speed: 130 km/h (81 mph) maximum 67 km/h (42 mph) average, including halts

The New Delhi-Kalka Shatabdi Express is a superfast express fully airconditioned train connecting New Delhi and Kalka. It is one of the superfast trains in the New Delhi - Kalka section covering a distance of 269 km in a span of 4 hours. The train runs at an average speed of 67 km per hour (includinhalts).

== Route and halts ==
Route and Halts for 12005 Kalka Shatabdi is:

• New Delhi

• Panipat Junction

•Kurukshetra Junction

• Ambala Cantonment Junction

• Chandigarh Junction

• Kalka

Route&Halts for 12011 Kalka Shatabdi Express is:

• New Delhi

• Sonipat Junction

• Panipat Junction

• Kurukshetra Junction

• Ambala Cantonment Junction

• Chandigarh Junction

• Kalka

== Coach composition ==
Coach Composition for 12005 Kalka Shatabdi.This train runs with Morden LHB Coaches.Coach Composition of this train is:

2 EOG Brake Van Luggage coach

14 AC Chair Car

2 AC Executive Chair Car

Coach Composition for 12011 Kalka Shatabdi.This train runs with Morden LHB Coaches.Coach Composition of this train is

2 EOG Brake Van Luggage coach

2 AC Executive Chair Car

14 AC Chair Car

== Coach positioning ==
Coach Positioning of 12005 Kalka Shatabdi at New Delhi Station is:

LOCO-EOG-C1-C2-C3-C4-C5-C6-C7-C8-C9-C10-C11-C12-C13-C14-E1-E2-EOG

Vice versa Coach Positioning at Kalka station.

Coach Positioning of 12011 Kalka Shatabdi at New Delhi Station is:

LOCO-EOG-C1-C2-C3-C4-C5-C6-C7-C8-C9-C10-C11-C12-C13-C14-E1-E2-EOG

Vice versa Coach Positioning at Kalka station

== Traction ==
12005 Kalka Shatabdi is hauled by Ghaziabad WAP-7

12011 Kalka Shatabdi is hauled by Ghaziabad WAP-7

== See also ==
- Indian Railways
- Kalka Shatabdi Express Lucknow to New Delhi Lucknow junction subah 6 10 per chalegi
