= Kurukshetra Junction railway station =

Railway station in Haryana, India

Kurukshetra Junction
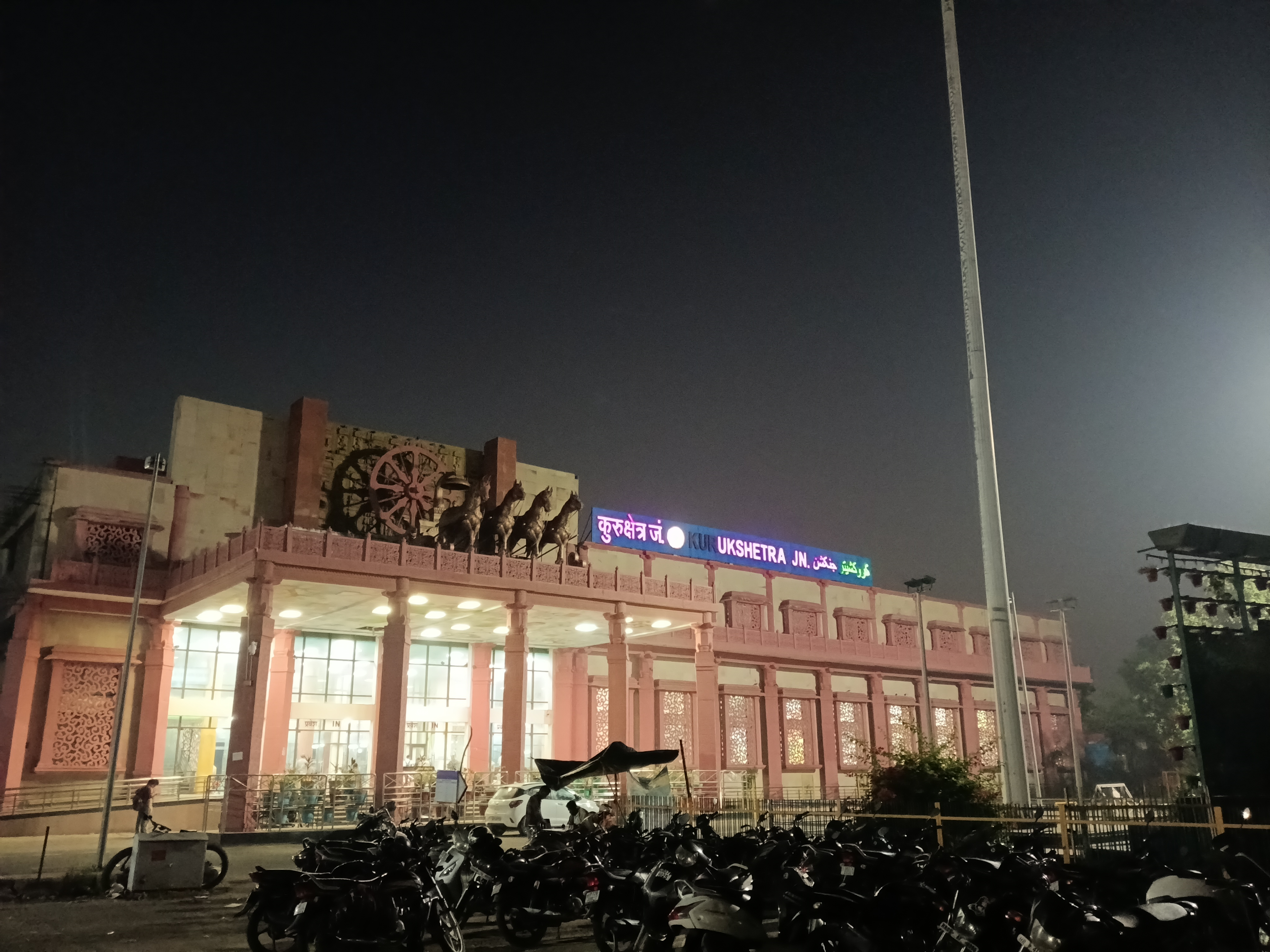
- Kurukshetra Junction Main Entrance

General information
- Location: Railway Road, Kurukshetra, Haryana; India
- Coordinates: 29.9695°N 76.8519°E
- Elevation: 260 metres (850 ft)
- System: Indian Railways junction station
- Owner: Indian Railways
- Operator: Northern Railway
- Lines: Delhi–Kalka line, Kurukshetra–Narwana branch line
- Platforms: 5

Construction
- Structure type: Standard on ground
- Parking: Yes
- Cycle facilities: No

Other information
- Status: Functioning
- Station code: KKDE
- Division(s): Delhi

History
- Electrified: 1995–1998
Location

Kurukshetra Junction railway station is a junction station at the junction of Delhi–Kalka line and Kurukshetra–Jind branch line. It is located in the Indian state of Haryana. It serves Kurukshetra and Thanesar city.

Signalling system: The station is equipped with Standard III interlocking System with Multiple aspect Color light Signals and mechanical points. Operation of signaling system is with levers at the cabins at both ends.

== Gallery ==
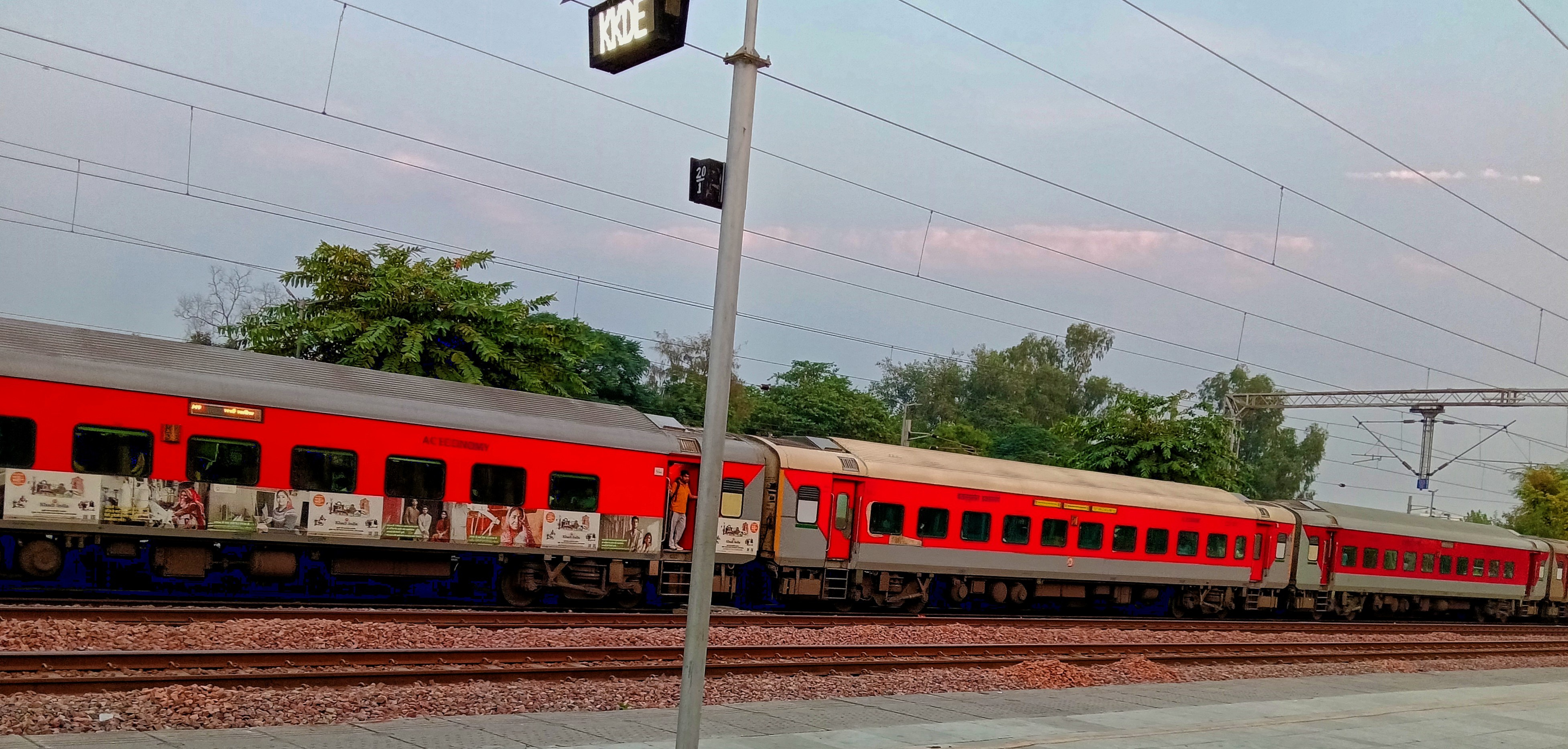
Amritsar - Mumbai CSMT Express At Kurukshetra Junction

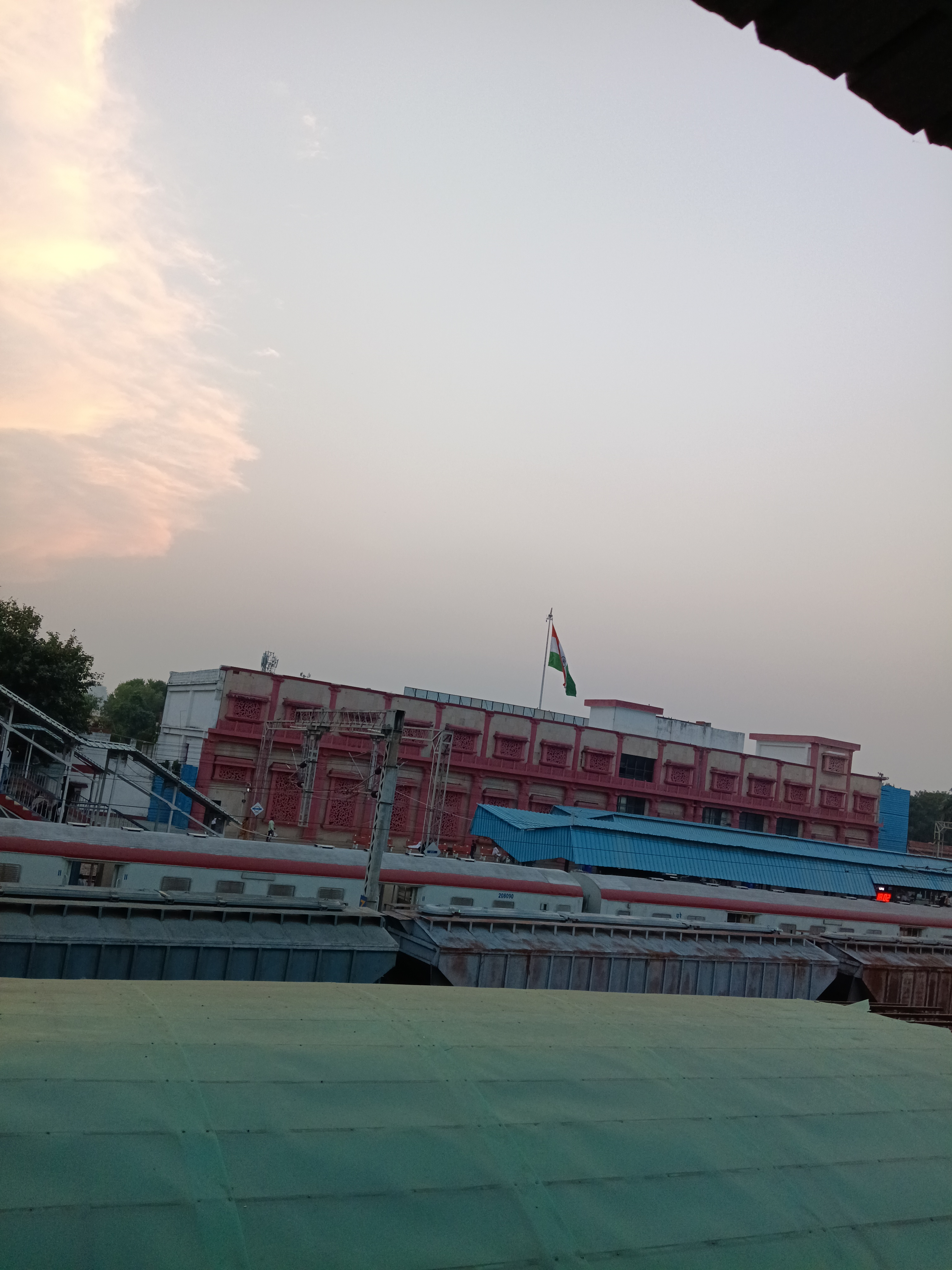
Kurukshetra Junction view

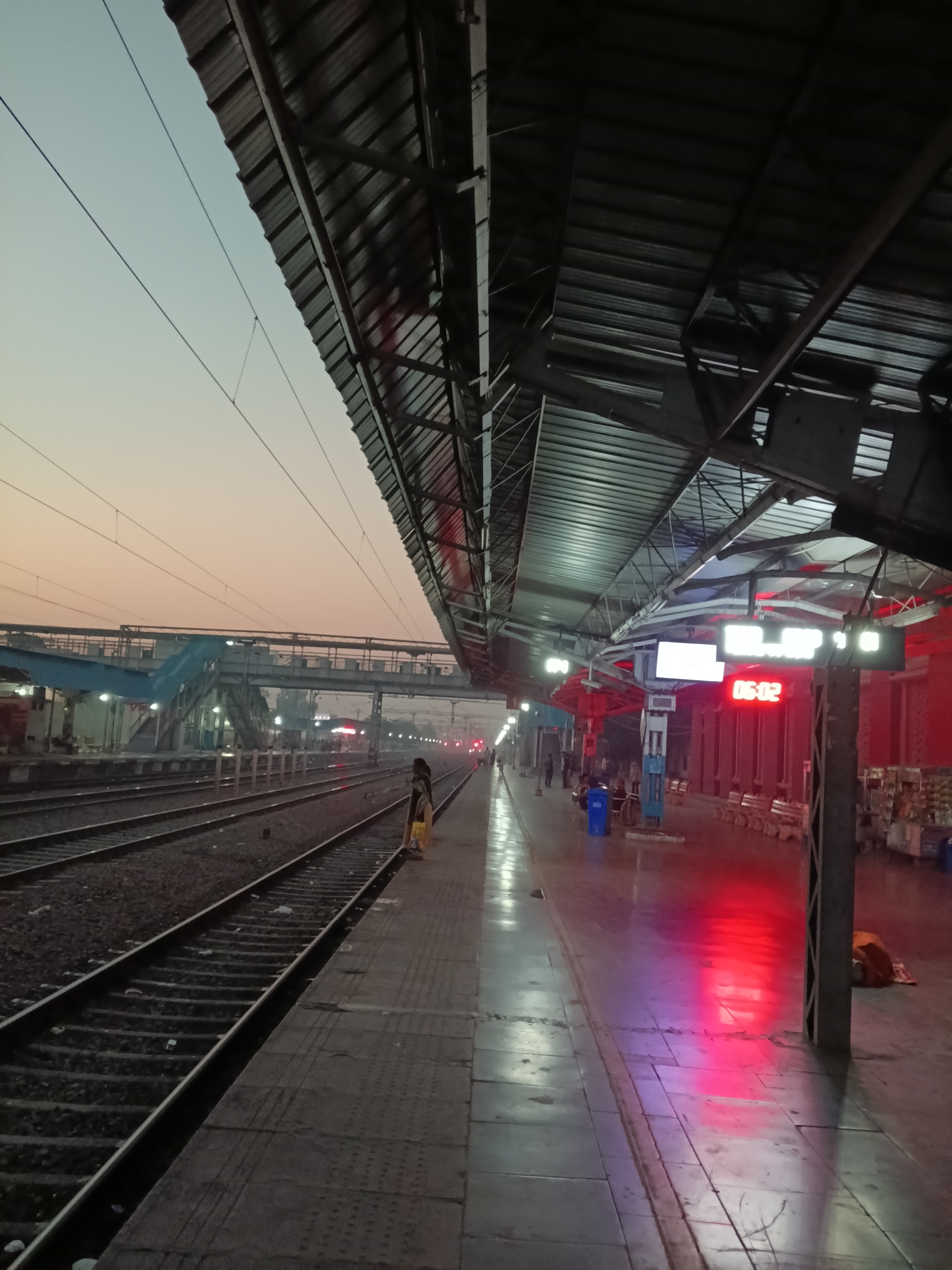
Kurukhetra Junction Platform 1

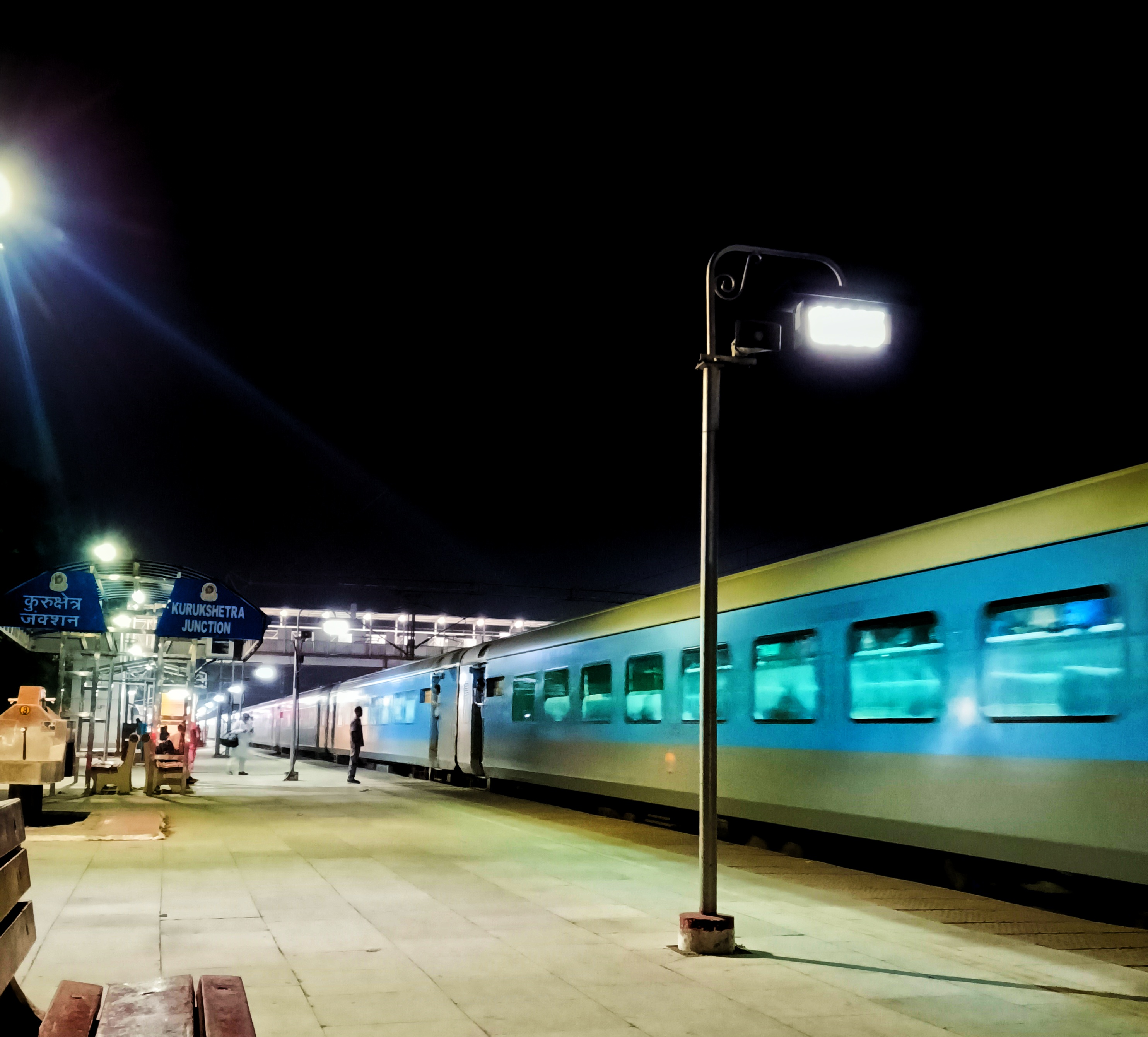
Kalka Shatabdi Express At Kurukshetra Junction

== Trains ==
Major trains at Kurukshetra are-

- Kalka Mail – Kalka to Howrah
- Himachal Express – Delhi to Amb Andaura
- New Delhi DEMU – New Delhi to Kurukshetra
- Ajmer–Chandigarh Garib Rath Express
- Jhelum Express – Jammu to Pune
- Allahabad–Chandigarh Unchahar Express
- Indore–Jammu Malwa Express
- New Delhi–Kalka Shatabdi Express
- Una Jan Shatabdi Express
- Shan-e-Punjab Express – New Delhi to Amritsar
- Sachkhand Express – Nanded To Amritsar
- Himalayan Queen Express – Kalka to Delhi Sarai Rohilla
- Amritsar–Jaynagar Saryu Yamuna Express
