= New Delhi railway station =

Major railway station in New Delhi, India

New Delhi
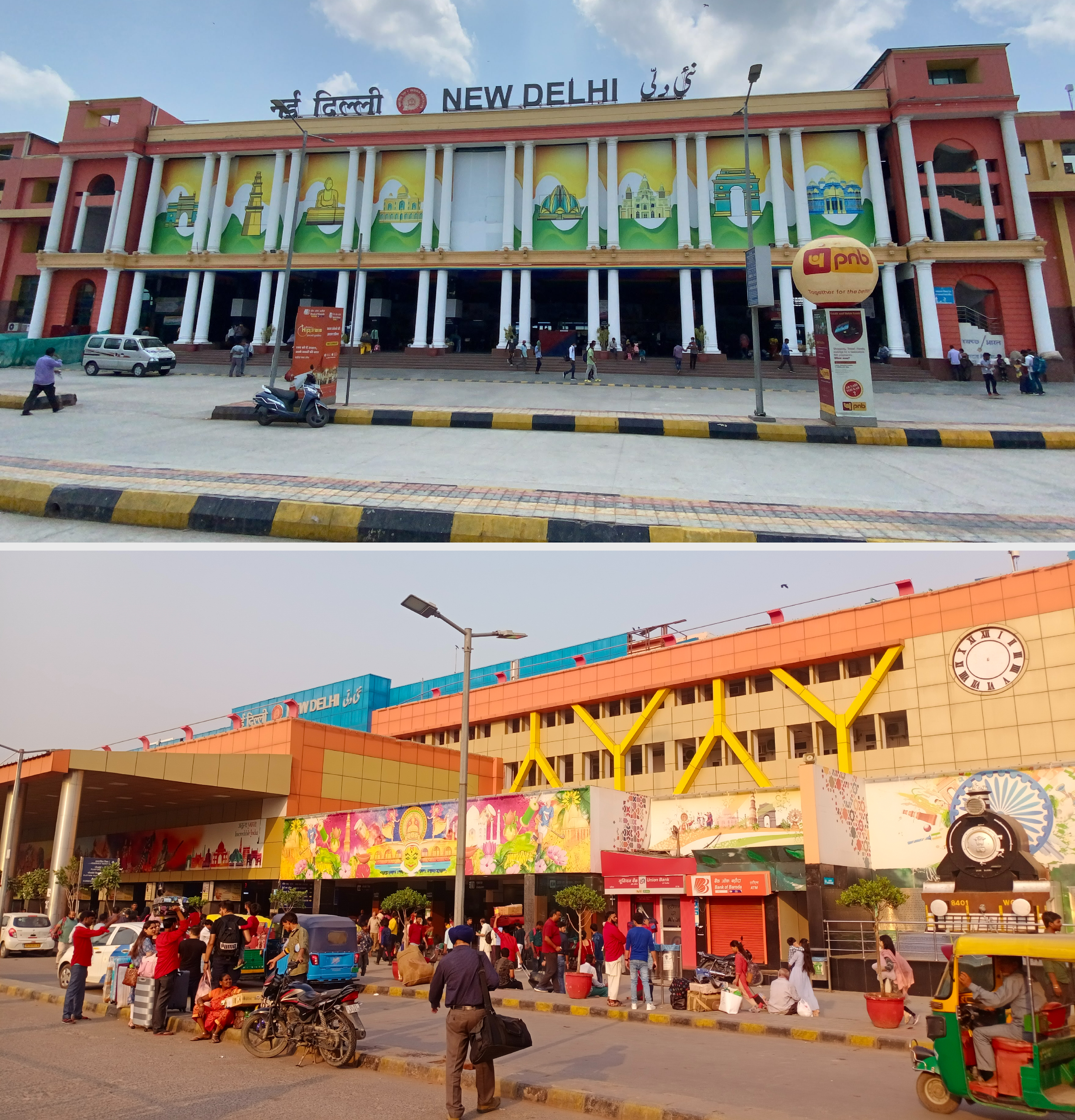
- The two entrances at Ajmeri Gate (top) and Paharganj (bottom)

General information
- Location: New Delhi, Delhi; India
- Coordinates: 28.6428°N 77.21908°E
- Elevation: 214.42 metres (703.5 ft)
- System: Indian Railway and Delhi Suburban Railway station
- Owner: Ministry of Railways (India)
- Operator: Indian Railways
- Lines: New Delhi–Palwal–Mathura section, New Delhi-Gaya-Howrah line, New Delhi-Howrah main line, New Delhi-Chennai main line, New Delhi-Mumbai main line, Delhi–Guwahati main line, New Delhi-Kalka line, New Delhi-Jaipur line, New Delhi-Fazilka line, New Delhi-Moradabad line, New Delhi-Meerut-Saharanpur line, New Delhi-Shamli-Saharanpur line,
- Platforms: 16
- Tracks: 20
- Connections: Yellow Line Airport Express Green Line (upcoming) New Delhi

Construction
- Structure type: At grade
- Accessible: Yes

Other information
- Station code: NDLS
- Zone(s): Northern Railway
- Division(s): Delhi

History
- Opened: 1956; 70 years ago
Route map
Location
- Location within India
- Interactive map

New Delhi railway station (station code: NDLS) is the primary railway hub for the Indian capital, New Delhi, and an integral part of Indian Railways. Situated in Central Delhi, right next to Paharganj, approximately 2 kilometers north of Connaught Place, the station features 16 platforms with entrances at Paharganj (platform 1) and Ajmeri Gate (platform 16). It is also served by the New Delhi metro station.

Along with Old Delhi railway station, Hazrat Nizamuddin Railway Station, Anand Vihar Terminal, and Sarai Rohilla Railway Station, it is one of the five primary railway stations catering to Delhi state, while the additional stations, such as the Bijwasan railway station, are also being developed. Categorised as NSG-1 (Non-Suburban Grade-1) station, the station being among the busiest railway stations in India accommodates over 250 trains on 16 platforms with daily footfall of approximately 500,000 passengers which peaks to 700,000 during peak festival seasons. The station holds the record for the largest route relay interlocking system in the world.

== History ==
=== 1911: First railway in Delhi ===
Before the proclamation of the new imperial capital at New Delhi in 1911, the Delhi Junction railway station served the entire city; the Agra–Delhi railway line cut through what is today referred to as Lutyens' Delhi. The line ran through plans for a new capital, including space set aside for the All India War Memorial and Kingsway. The railway line was realigned along the Yamuna River and opened in 1924, coinciding with the construction of the Minto Rail Bridge.

=== 1926: Origin of New Delhi railway station ===
In 1926, the East Indian Railway Company approved the construction of a single-story building and a single platform between Ajmeri Gate and Paharganj; this would eventually morph into the New Delhi railway station. The government's plans to construct the new station inside the Central Park of Connaught Place was rejected. The Viceroy entered the city through the new railway station during the inauguration of New Delhi in 1931. New structures were added to the railway station later and the original building served as the parcel office for many years.

=== 1955 onwards: upgrades ===
By 1955, construction of a new station building commenced at a cost of ₹20 lakh (equivalent to ₹24 crore or US$2.5 million in 2026), and the singular platform station was officially inaugurated on 16 April 1956. Heretofore, the Old Delhi railway station served as the primary railway station for the city. The concrete exterior of the building was clad with sandstone for the 1982 Asian Games, then covered with aluminum for the 2010 Commonwealth Games.

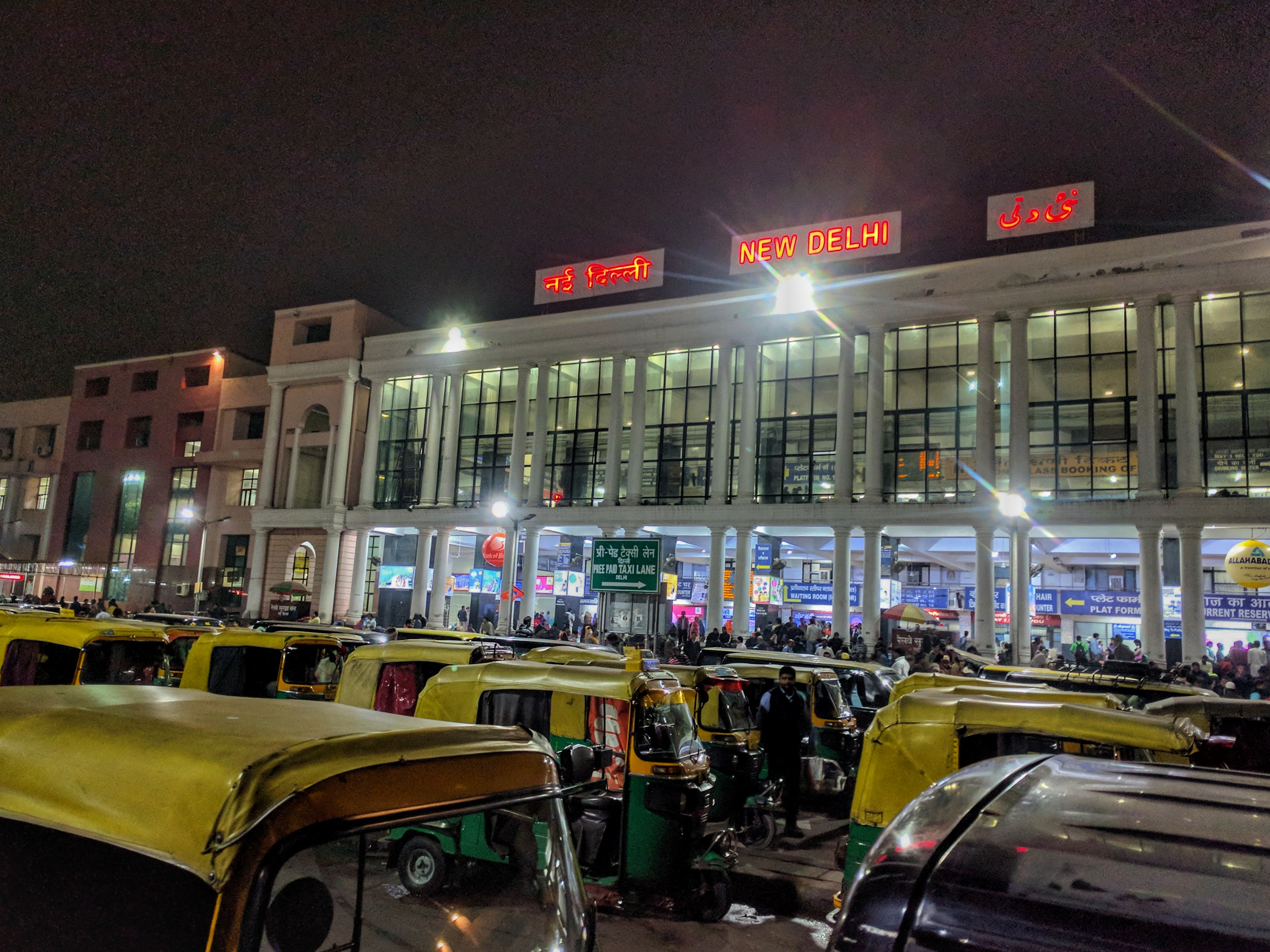
The Ajmeri Gate entrance at night

=== 2009 onwards: upgrades ===
In September 2009, the new 3-story 9,000 m^{2} building of the station facing Ajmeri Gate was opened to the public. Later the number of platforms was increased from 12 to 16. Since 1999, route relay interlocking system implemented here, has been recognised by the Guinness World Records as the largest in the world.

=== 2025-2029: upgrades ===
New Delhi railway station has witnessed numerous initiatives over the decades to decongest it.

The 45 month-long ₹2,469 crore redevelopment project with January 2029 target completion will have new modern eco-friendly energy-saving green solar buildings on both the Paharganj and Ajmeri Gate sides, redevelopment of all 16 platforms, 7 flyovers around the station and 2 tunnels to ease vehicular traffic congestion caused by the cargo, improved integrated AI-based CCTV and security control systems, improved Passenger Amenities (spacious waiting areas, improved signage, and better accessibility with escalators and elevators) and Multimodal Transport Hub (to integrate rail, metro, bus, and other modes of transport, creating a seamless connection for passengers). Upgrade will be undertaken in 4 phases, phase-1 from Paharganj side platform 1 to 6, phase-2 platform 7 to 9, phase-3 platform 10 to 13, phase-4 platform 14 to 16. Initially, phase-1 and 2 will be undertaken simultaneously while existing platforms for phase-3 and 4 will remain in use. Once the phase 1 and 2 are complete, phase-3 and 4 platforms will be closed for the redevelopment.

== Major trains ==
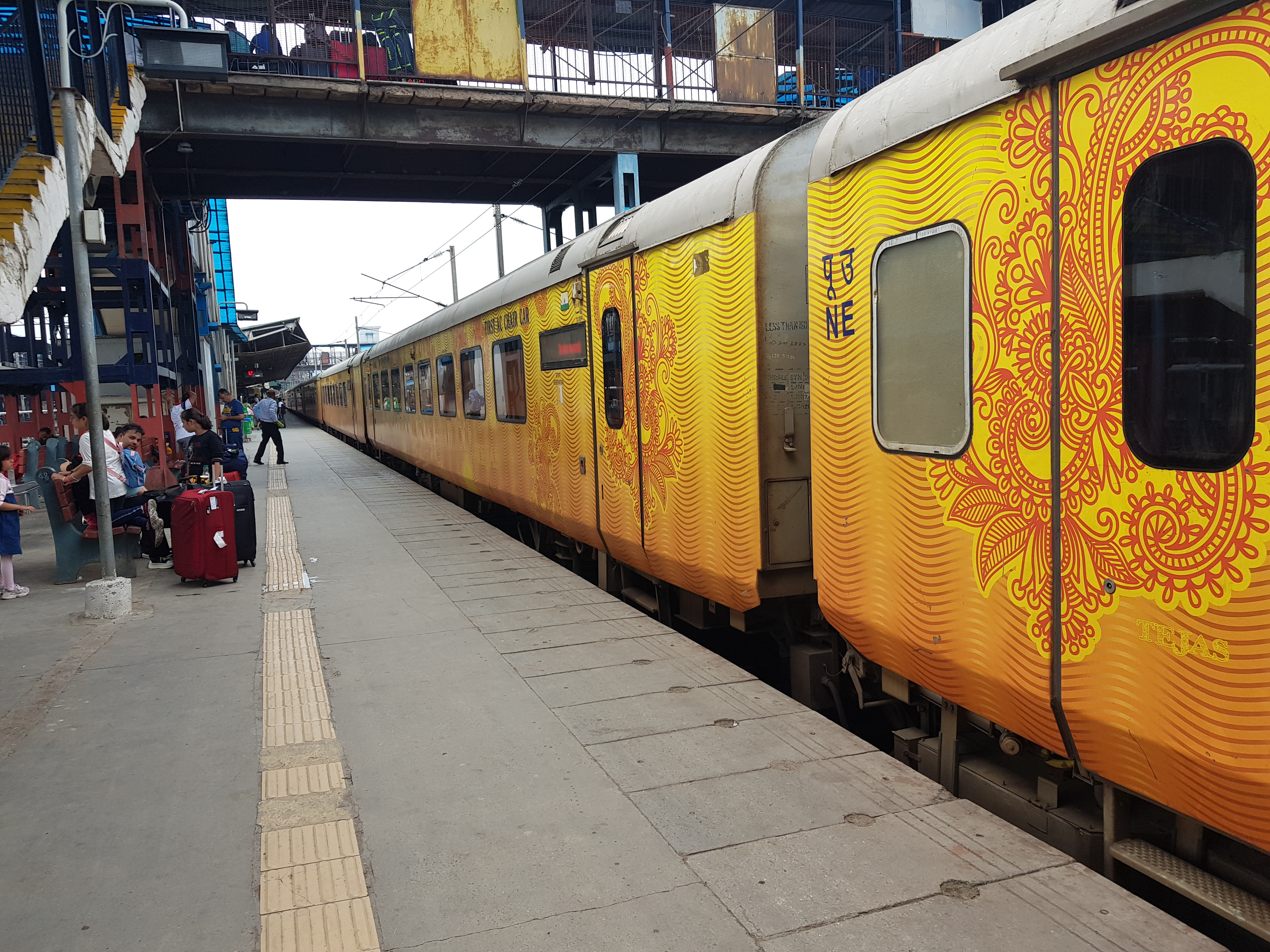
Lucknow Tejas Express at the New Delhi railway station

The major trains which originates/halts from/at New Delhi are as follows:

- Varanasi–New Delhi Vande Bharat Sleeper Express (27421/27422)
- New Delhi–Varanasi Vande Bharat Express (22435/22436)
- New Delhi–Shri Mata Vaishno Devi Katra Vande Bharat Express (22439/22440)
- New Delhi–Amb Andaura Vande Bharat Express (22448/22449)
- Varanasi–New Delhi Vande Bharat Express (22415/22416)
- SMVD Katra–New Delhi Vande Bharat Express (22477/22478)
- Lucknow–New Delhi Tejas Express (82501/82502)
- Rani Kamalapati–New Delhi Shatabdi Express (12001/12002)
- Lucknow–New Delhi Swarna Shatabdi Express (12003/12004)
- New Delhi–Kalka Shatabdi Express (12005/12006)
- New Delhi–Kalka Shatabdi Express (12011/12012)
- New Delhi–Amritsar Shatabdi Express (12013/12014)
- New Delhi–Daurai (Ajmer) Shatabdi Express (12015/12016)
- New Delhi–Dehradun Shatabdi Express (12017/12018)
- New Delhi–Amritsar Swarna Shatabdi Express (12029/12030)
- New Delhi–Amritsar Shatabdi Express (12031/12032)
- Kanpur–New Delhi Shatabdi Express (12033/12034)
- New Delhi–Kathgodam Shatabdi Express (12039/12040)
- New Delhi–Chandigarh Shatabdi Express(12045/12046)
- Bhubaneswar–New Delhi Duronto Express (12281/12282)
- Howrah–New Delhi Duronto Express (12273/12274)
- Sealdah–Bikaner Duronto Express (12259/12260)
- Mumbai Central–New Delhi Tejas Rajdhani Express (12951/12952)
- Rajendra Nagar–New Delhi Tejas Rajdhani Express (12309/12310)
- Bhubaneswar Tejas Rajdhani Express (Via Adra) (22811/22812)
- Bhubaneswar Tejas Rajdhani Express (Via Tatanagar) (22823/22824)
- Bhubaneswar Tejas Rajdhani Express (Via Sambalpur City) (20817/20818)
- Swarna Jayanti Rajdhani Express (12958/12959)
- Howrah–New Delhi Rajdhani Express (via Gaya) (12301/12302)
- Howrah–New Delhi Rajdhani Express (via Patna) (12305/12306)
- Sealdah Rajdhani Express (12313/12314)
- Dibrugarh Rajdhani Express (Via Moranhat)(20503/20504)
- Dibrugarh Rajdhani Express (Via Rangapara North) (20505/20506)
- Dibrugarh Rajdhani Express (Via New Tinsukia) (12423/12424)
- Ranchi–New Delhi Rajdhani Express (Via Bokaro Steel City) (20839/20840)
- Ranchi–New Delhi Rajdhani Express (Via Chopan) (12453/12454)
- Ranchi–New Delhi Rajdhani Express (Via Japla) (20407/20408)
- Jammu Tawi Rajdhani Express (12425/12426)
- Bilaspur Rajdhani Express (12441/12442)
- Nagpur–Amritsar AC Superfast Express (22125/22126)
- Katra - New Delhi Shri Shakti AC Superfast Express (22461/22462)
- Lucknow–New Delhi AC Superfast Express (12429/12430)
- Prayagraj–New Delhi Humsafar Express (12275/12276)
- Godda–New Delhi Humsafar Express (12349/12350)
- Hazur Sahib Nanded–Jammu Tawi Humsafar Express (12751/12752)
- Guwahati - New Delhi Poorvottar Sampark Kranti Express (22449/22450)
- Silchar–New Delhi Poorvottar Sampark Kranti Express (14037/14038)
- Katra - New Delhi Uttar Sampark Kranti Express (12445/12446)
- Madgaon - New Delhi Goa Sampark Kranti Express (12449/12450)
- Trivandrum - New Delhi Kerala Sampark Kranti Express (12217/12218)
- Yesvantpur–Chandigarh Karnataka Sampark Kranti Express (22685/22686)
- Darbhanga - New Delhi Bihar Sampark Kranti Express (12566/12567)
- New Delhi–Dehradun Jan Shatabdi Express (12055/12056)
- Una–New Delhi Jan Shatabdi Express (12057/12058)
- Rajendra Nagar Terminal–New Delhi Amrit Bharat Express (22361/22362)
- Lucknow Mail (12229/12230)
- Taj Express (12279/12280)
- Poorva Express (via Patna) (12303/12304)
- Poorva Express (via Gaya) (12381/12382)
- Shramjeevi Superfast Express (12391/12392)
- Sampoorna Kranti Express (12393/12394)
- Mahabodhi Express (12397/12398)
- Indore–New Delhi Intercity Superfast Express (12415/12416)
- Prayagraj Express (12417/12418)
- Gomti Express (12419/12420)
- Shram Shakti Express (12452/12453)
- Shan-e-Punjab Express (12497/12498)
- Vaishali Express (12553/12554)
- Shiv Ganga Express (12559/12560)
- Swatantra Senani Superfast Express (12561/12562)
- Manduadih–New Delhi Superfast Express (12581/12582)
- Grand Trunk Express (12615/12616)
- Tamil Nadu Express (12621/12622)
- Kerala Express (12626/12627)
- Karnataka Express (12628/12629)
- Telangana Express (12724/12725)
- Ranchi–New Delhi Garib Rath Express (12877/12878)
- Malda Town–New Delhi Express (14003/14004)
- Agra Cantt–New Delhi Intercity Express (14211/14212)
- Bareilly–New Delhi Intercity Express (14315/14316)
- New Delhi–Rohtak Intercity Express (14323/14324)
- Kashi Vishwanath Express (15127/15128)
- Dr. Ambedkar Nagar–New Delhi Superfast Express (20155/20156)
- Magadh Express (20801/20802)
- Andhra Pradesh Express (20805/20806)
- Puducherry–New Delhi Express (22403/22404)
- Varanasi Mahamana Express (22417/22418)
- Ballia–New Delhi Express (22581/22582)
- Mumbai CSMT–Amritsar Express (11057/11058)
- Malwa Express (12919/12920)
- Punjab Mail (12137/12138)
- Gorakhdham Express (12555/12556)
- Hapa–Shri Mata Vaishno Devi Katra Superfast Express (12475/12476)
- Jamnagar–Shri Mata Vaishno Devi Katra Superfast Express (12477/12478)
- Gandhidham–Shri Mata Vaishno Devi Katra Sarvodaya Express (12473/12474)
- Swaraj Express (12471/12472)
- Tripura Sundari Express (14619/14620)
- Kota–MCTM Udhampur Weekly Superfast Express (20985/20986)
- Thiruvananthapuram North–Amritsar Weekly Express (12483/12484)
- Sainagar Shirdi–Kalka Express (22455/22456)
- Agra Cantonment–Hoshiarpur Express (11905/11906)
- Hirakud Express (20807/20808)
- Gita Jayanti Express (11841/11842)
- Sirsa Express (15085/15086)

== Rail traffic ==
=== Passenger footfall ===
The station has daily footfall of 500,000 passengers, which rises to 700,000 during festivals. In 2011, the daily revenue was ₹75 lakh (US$80,000).

=== Trains ===
The station serves as the primary originating junction for the Rajdhani Express, Shatabdi Express, Vande Bharat Express, Amrit Bharat Express, Mahaparinirvan Express Buddhist circuit train, several luxury tourist trains such as the Palace on Wheels, Royal Rajasthan on Wheels, and Maharajas' Express have itineraries that begin and conclude at New Delhi Railway Station.

The station accommodates a total of over 400 unique trains, with 13-23 trains per platform per day, including over 250 passenger trains every day, ad the rest being cargo trains.

=== Lines ===
Delhi's suburban and ring rail network

==== Highspeed trains ====
Delhi-Ahmedabad high-speed rail corridor is under construction.

==== Long distance trains ====
New Delhi–Mumbai main line and Howrah–Gaya–Delhi line (part of Diamond Quadrilateral and New Delhi–Chennai main line) run through here,

==== Suburban trains ====
Suburban rail services, such as the Delhi Ring Railway and the Delhi Suburban Railway, from the station has over 78 suburban trains serving the ring railway as well as the radial routes extending towards Faridabad–Palwal, Sonipat–Panipat, Rohtak, Gurgaon–Rewari, and Shahdara–Shamli.

== Facilities ==
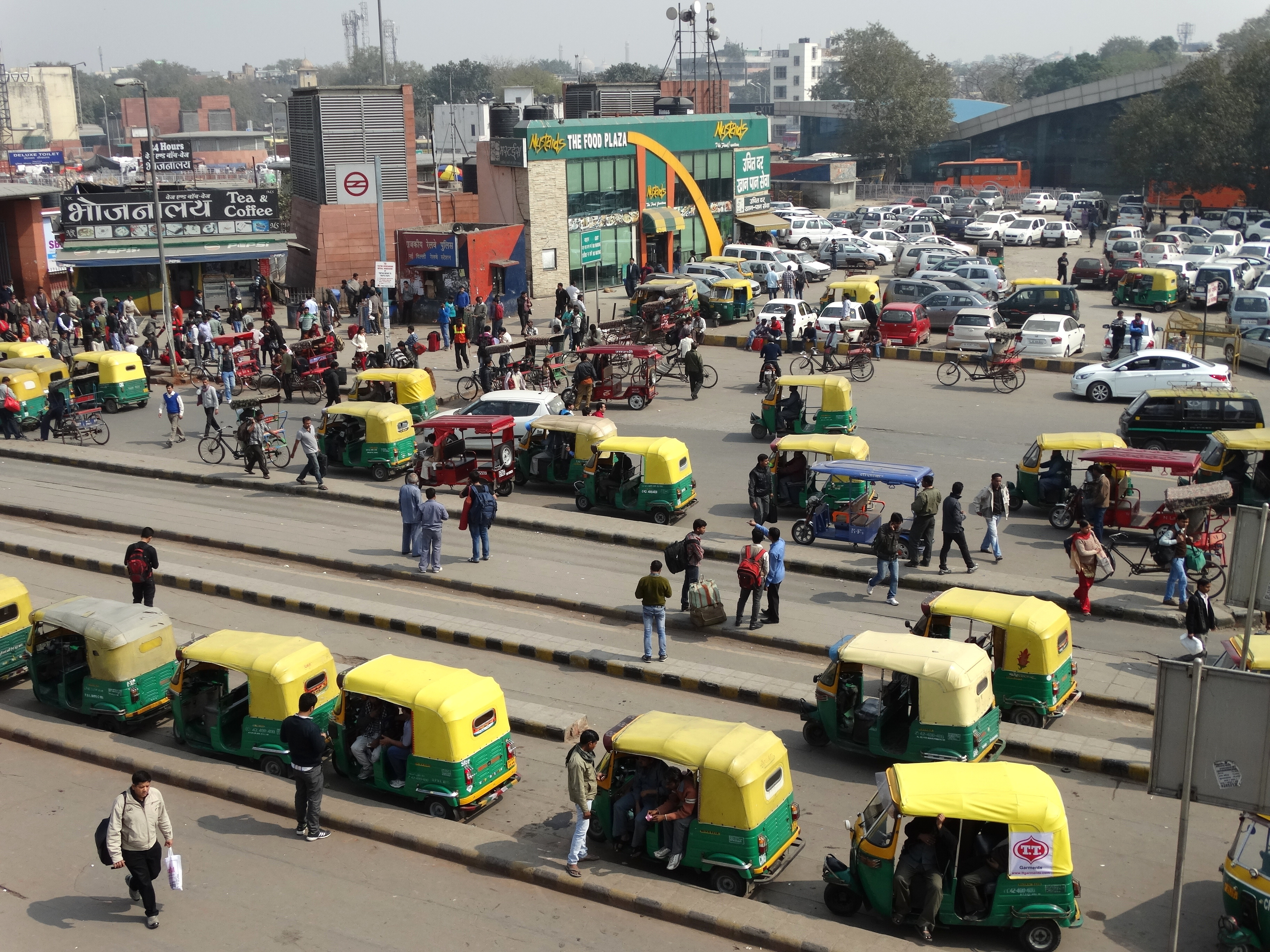
Autos, taxis, parking, metro, and eating joints visible at the Ajmeri Gate exit

Station categorised as NSG-1 station.

- Food and beverage: a round-the-clock food court, water vending machines, snack shops, and base kitchens for supplying food for the long distance trains.
- Shopping: souvenir shop, book and magazine stalls on all platforms.
- Communications and electronics: Wi-Fi connectivity, and energy saving lighting.
- Rest and recuperation: passenger waiting rooms, two executive lounges, and Ginger Hotel.
- Luggage: at least one escalator per platform, licensed porters, cargo loading and unloading provisions.
- Security: CCTV cameras monitored by the Railway Police, two police stations and three police posts, security personnel of the Government Railway Police, Railway Protection Force, and Delhi Police,

== Last-mile connectivity ==
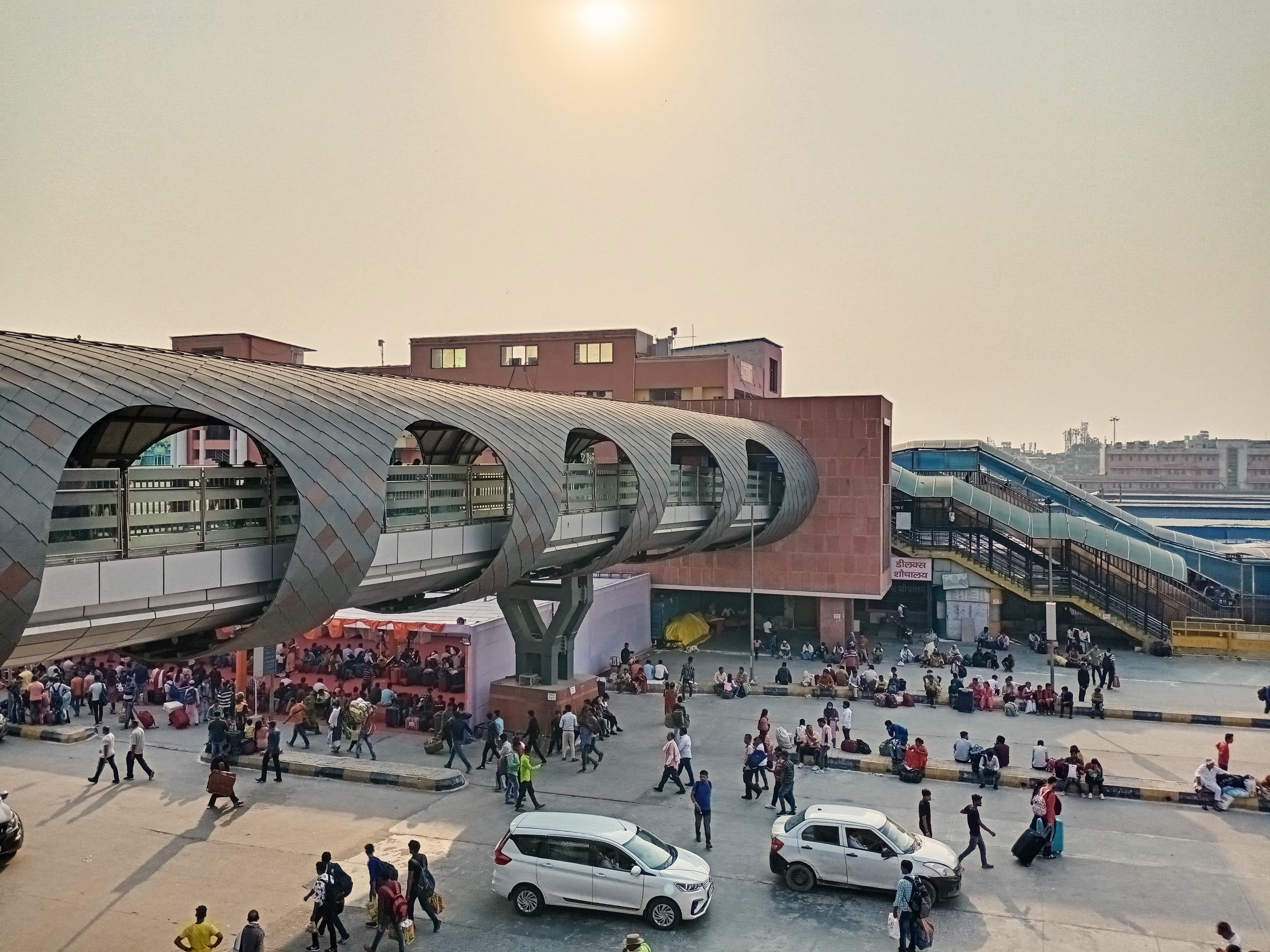
Foot-over-bridge connecting the station to the parking and the Airport Express Line

=== Delhi Metro ===
New Delhi railway station is served by the Yellow Line and Airport Express Line of the Delhi Metro, the latter of which provides a direct connection to Indira Gandhi International Airport and links further to the Pink Line and Blue Line. A 242-meter (794-foot) skywalk connects the foot overbridges on the Ajmeri Gate entrance of the station to the metro station and the parking complex on Bhavbhuti Marg. The foot overbridge from the entrance overlooking Paharganj to the Bhavbhuti Marg parking area spans 442 meters (1,450 feet).

=== Road ===
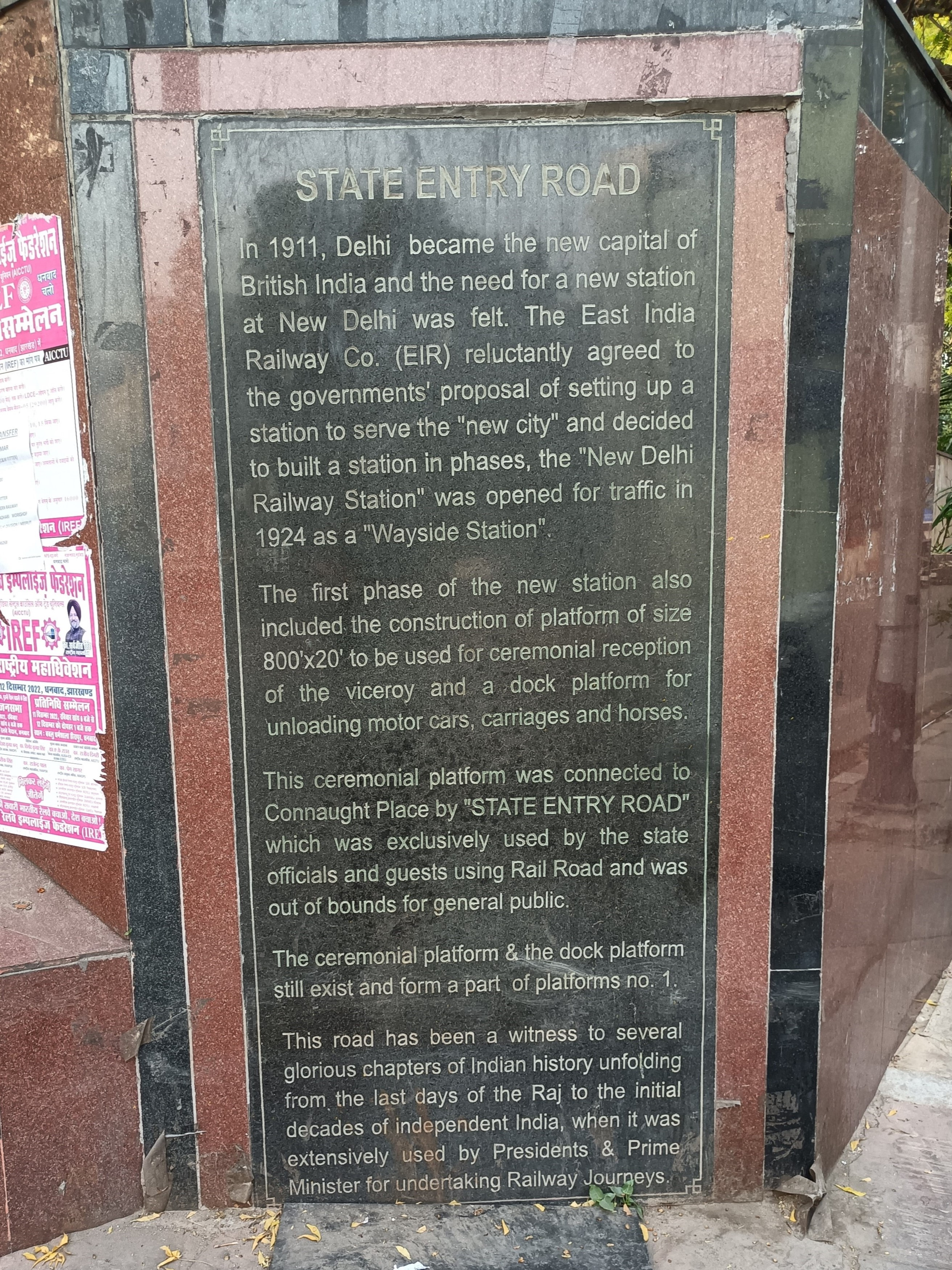
A commemorative plaque of the State Entry Road, Connaught Place

State Entry Road, on entrance abutting Paharganj, provides an alternative route to the congested Chelmsford Road.

=== Attractions nearby ===
Around 8 temples and 5 mosques are situated in the vicinity of the station. A temple, the Lankeshwar Mahadev Temple, is located on platforms 6–7, while a mosque, Masjid Ghareeb Shah, is situated on platforms 2–3.

The historic Mughal-era edifices of Ajmeri Gate and Ghaziuddin's Mosque are also located in the vicinity of the station. The AMASR Act regulates construction in the vicinity of centrally-protected monuments.

== Issues ==
=== Accidents ===
On 15 February 2025, at least 18 people were killed in a stampede at the New Delhi railway station as passengers tried to board trains heading to the 2025 Prayagraj Kumbh Mela.

=== Vehicle traffic congestion ===
Vehicle traffic congestion at the station has been a persistent issue.

== Gallery ==
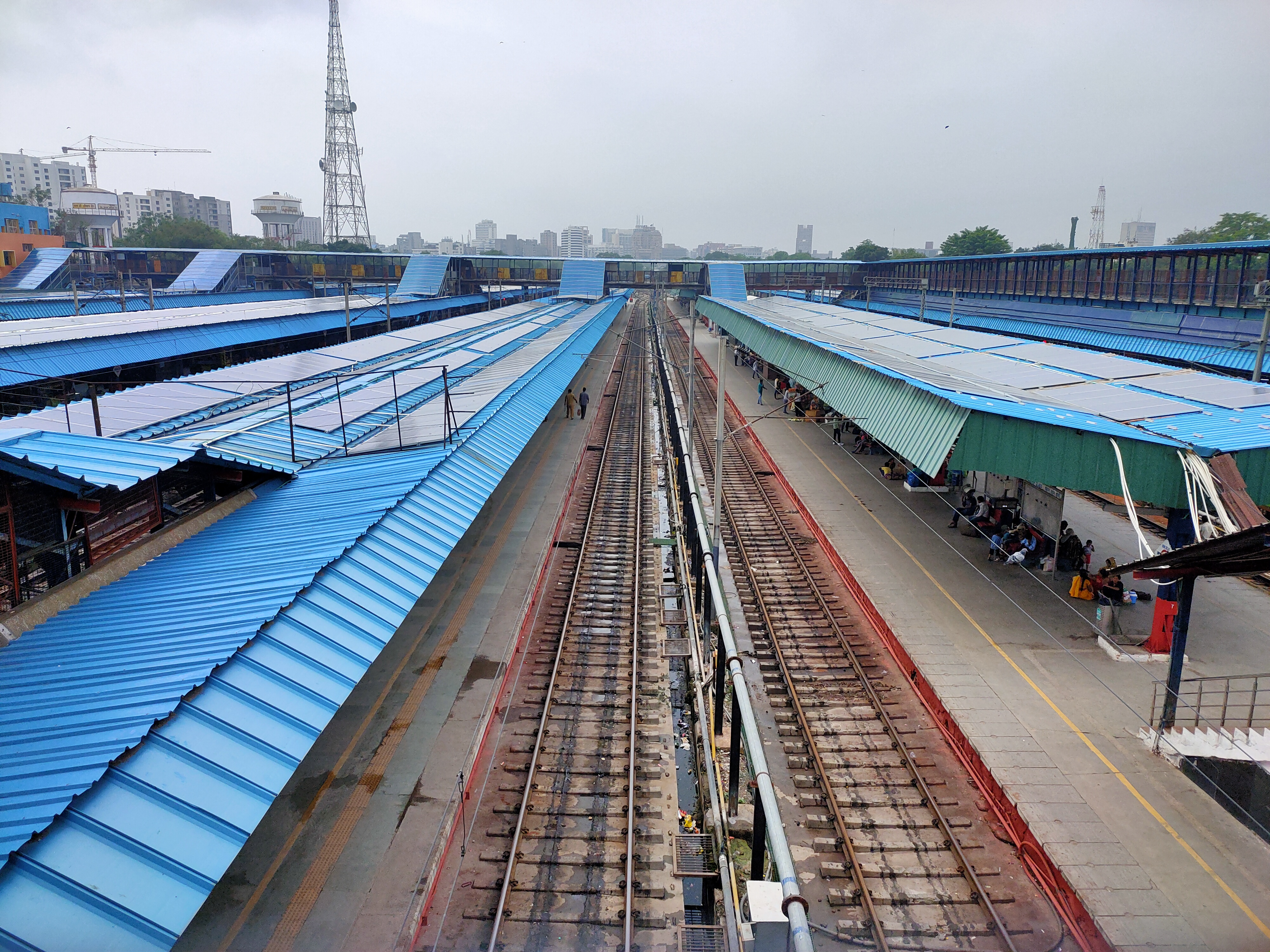
Solar panels on multiple platform covers

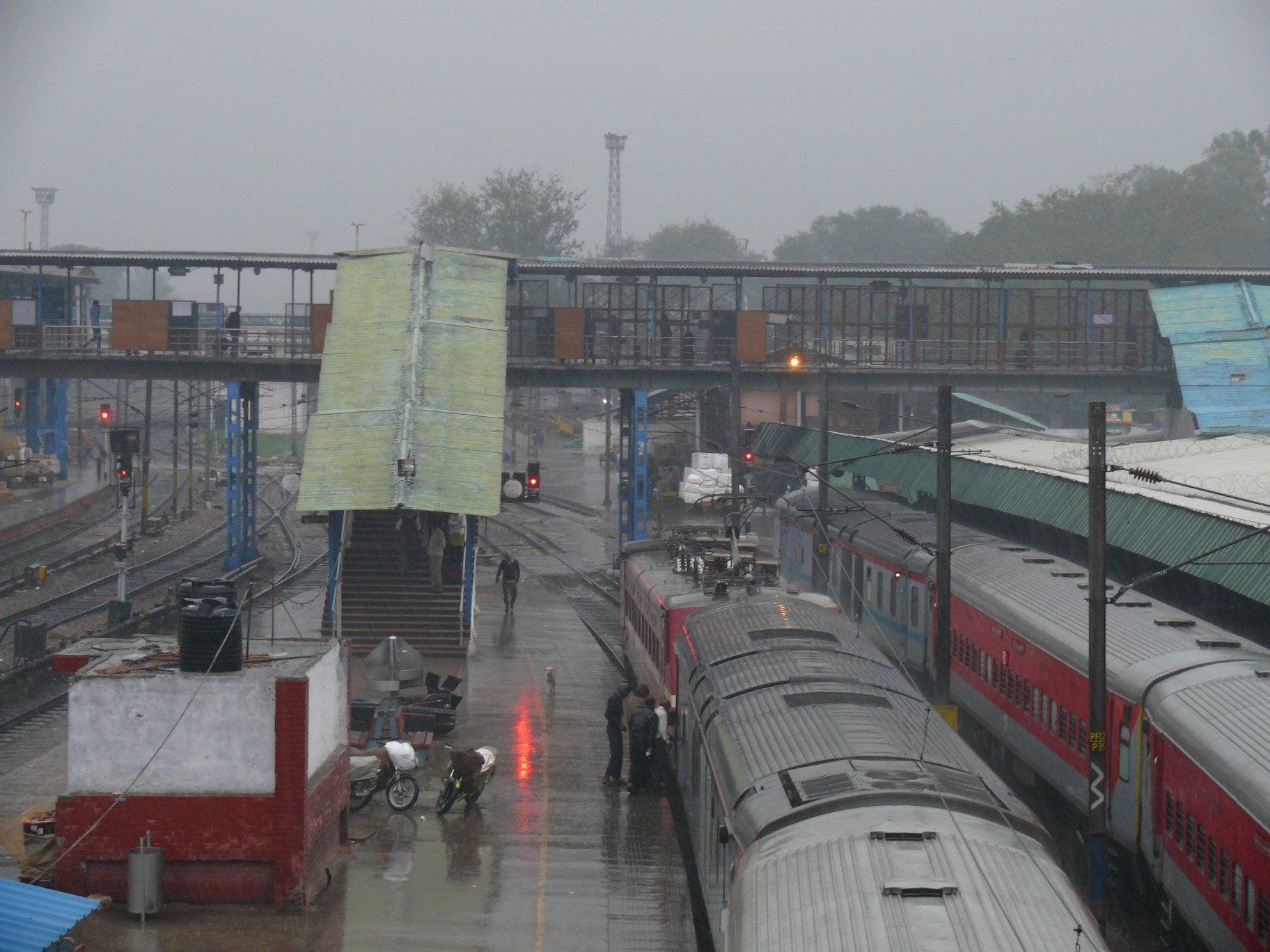
Foot over bridges connect all the platforms

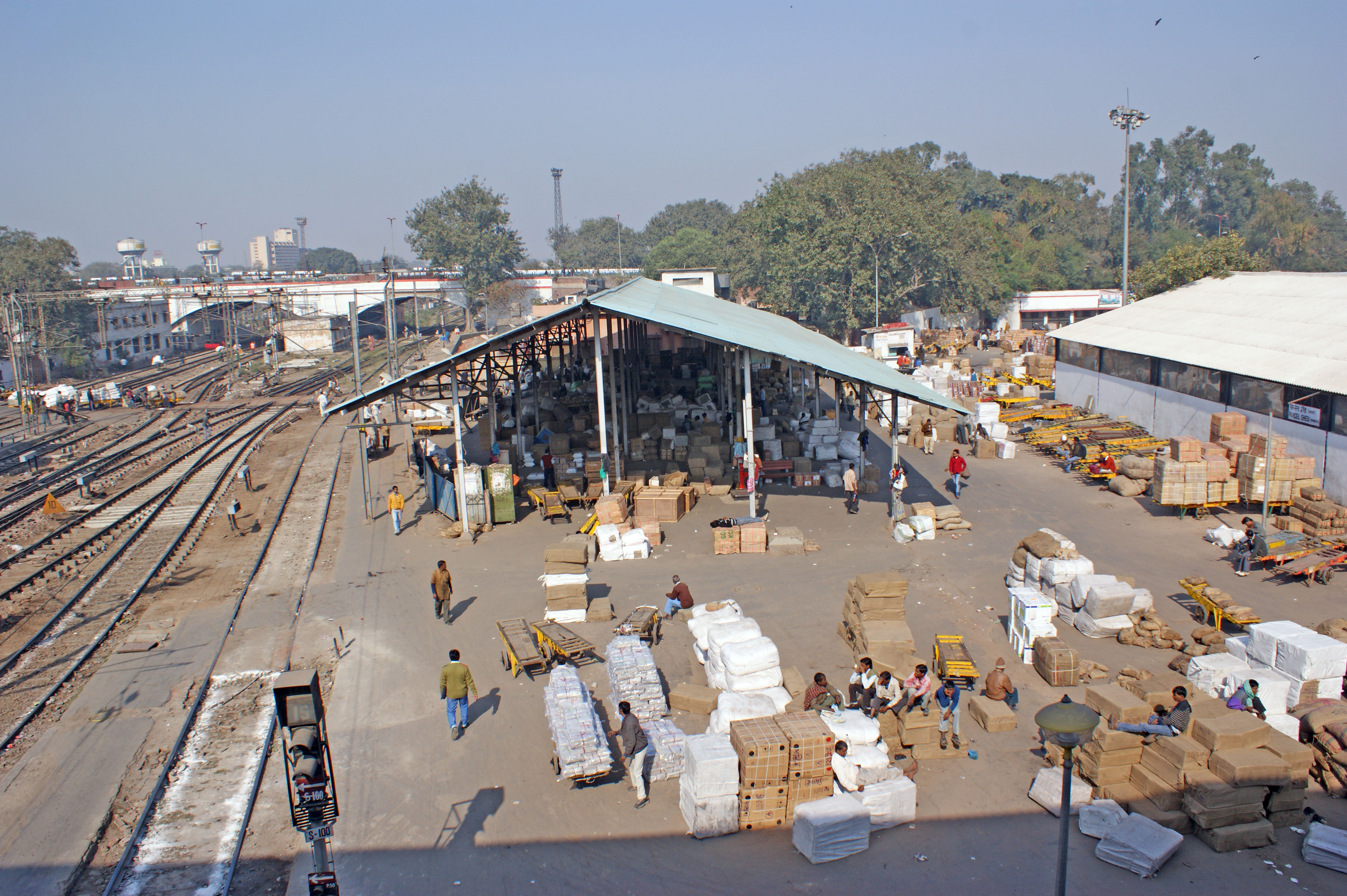
A parcel/mail/cargo handling area, 2010

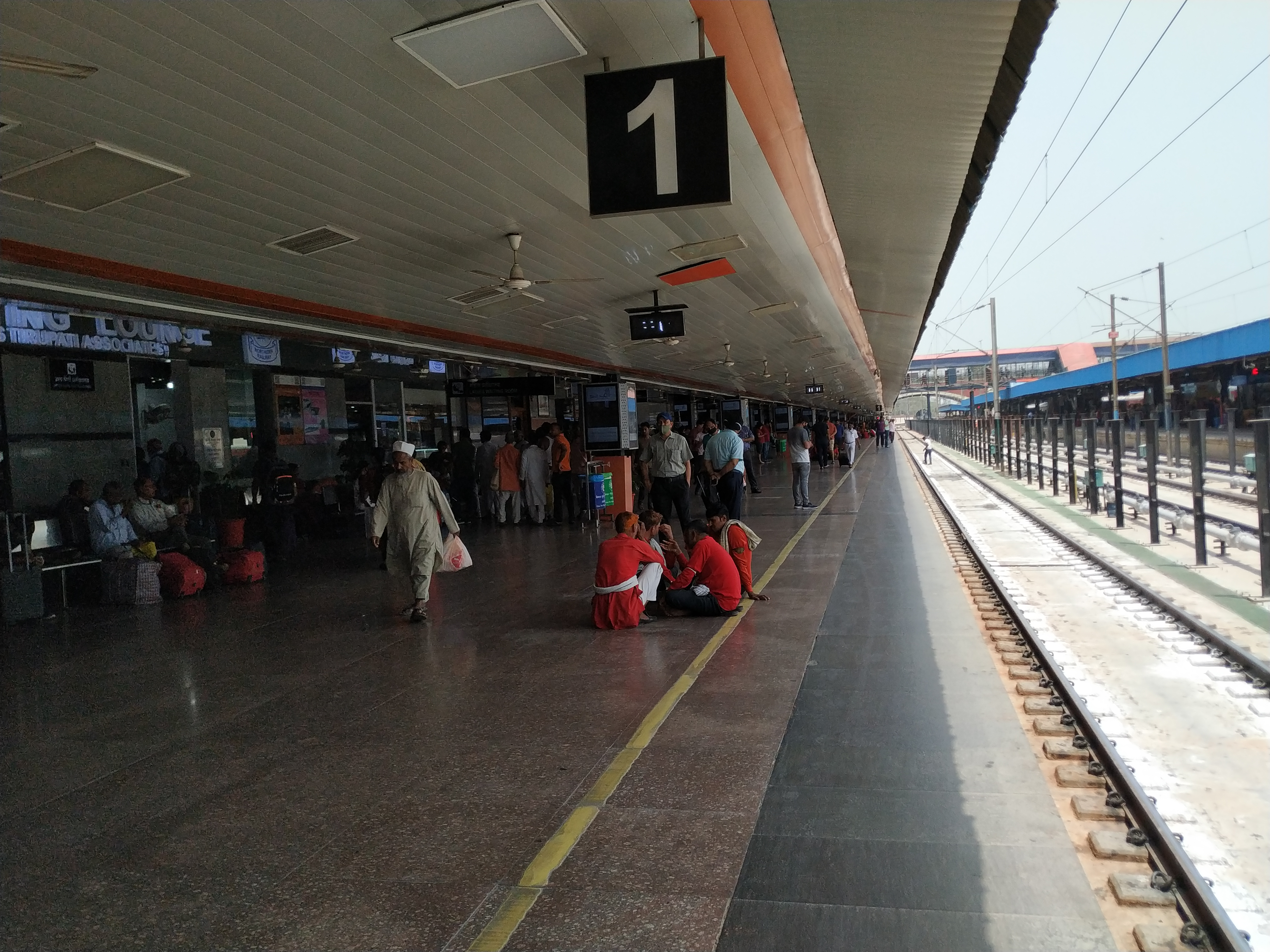
Porters awaiting a train's arrival

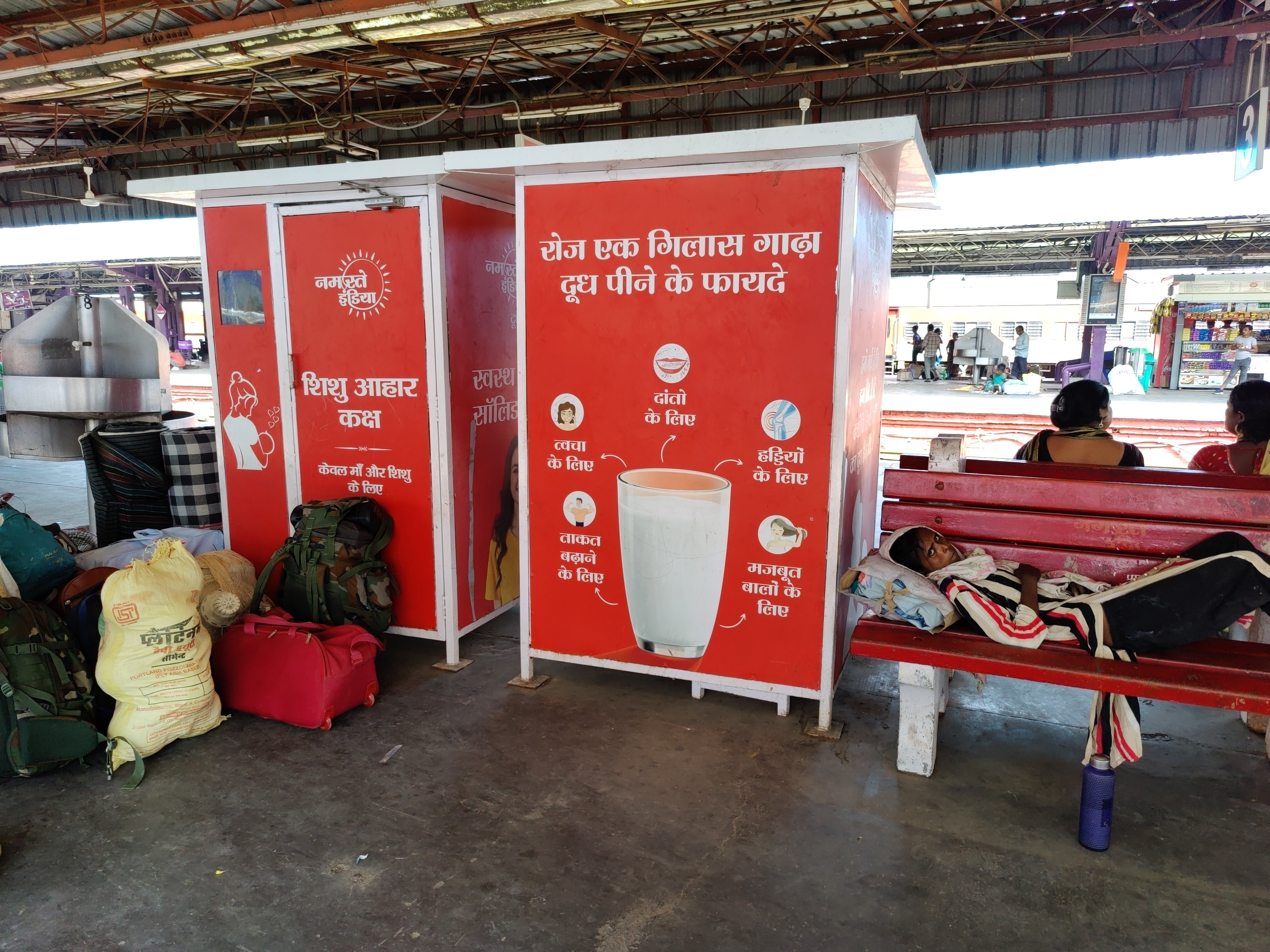
Baby feeding room for mothers

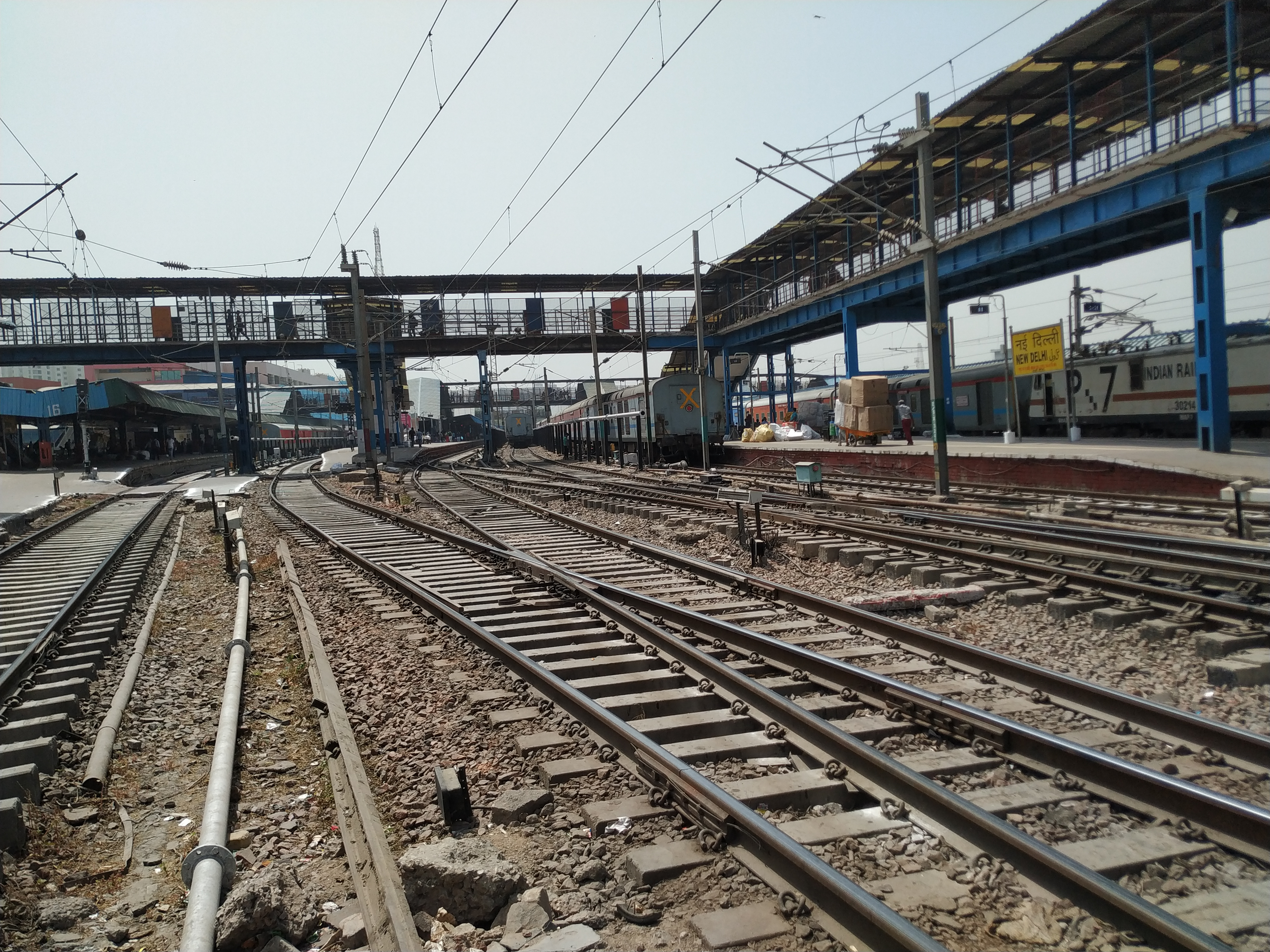
Standard 5 ft 6 in gauge railway, platform 14-15

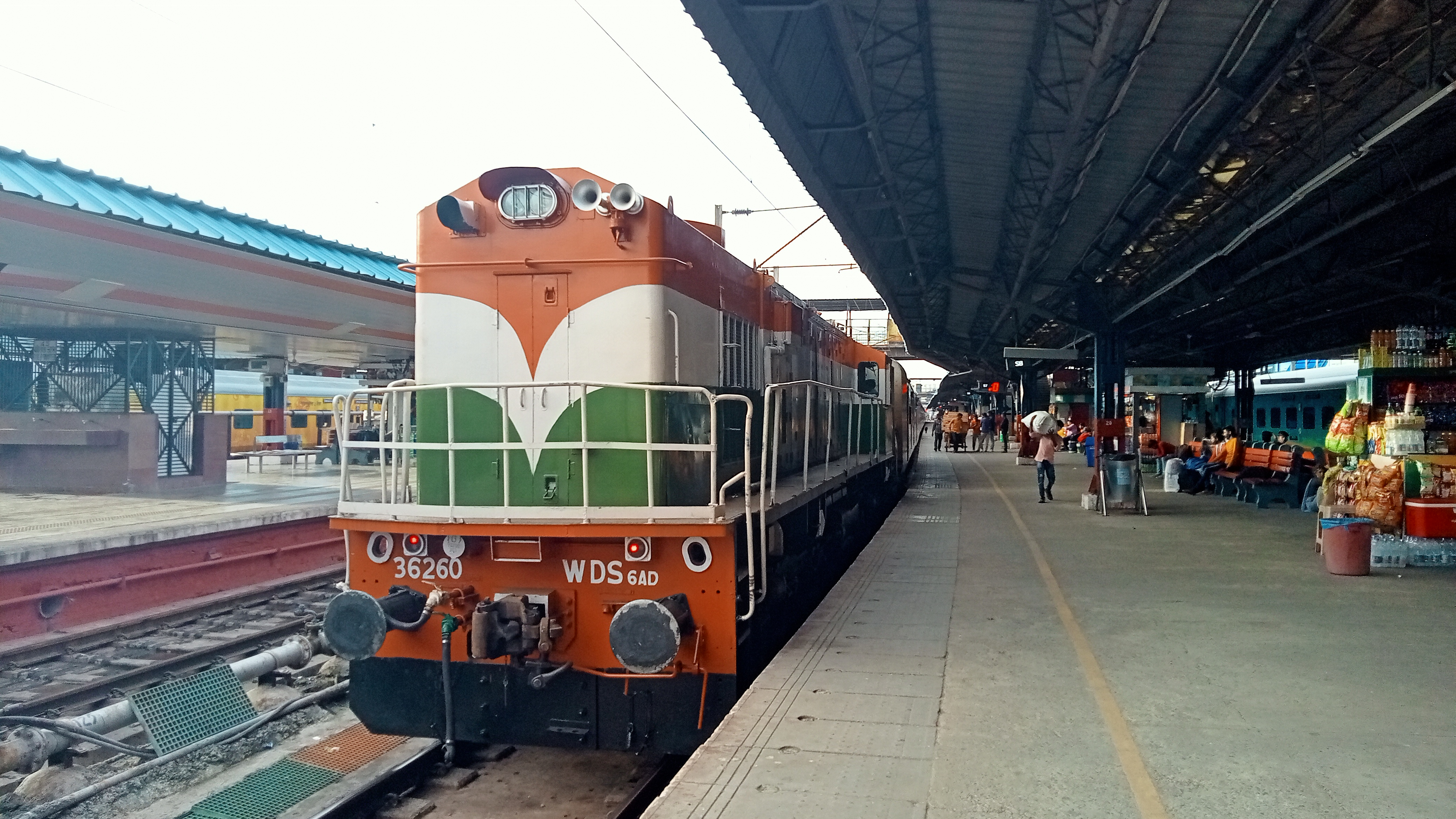
WDS-6AD shunter locomotive

== See also ==
- Tourism in Delhi
- Transport in Delhi
- List of railway stations in Delhi
