= Kota–MCTM Udhampur Weekly Superfast Express =

Train in India

Overview
- Service type: Express
- First service: 12 November 2014; 10 years ago
- Current operator(s): West Central Railway

Route
- Termini: Kota Junction (KOTA); MCTM Udhampur (UHP)
- Stops: 20
- Distance travelled: 1,095 km (680 mi)
- Average journey time: 21 hrs 45 mins
- Service frequency: Weekly (Note: Runs one day in a week for every direction.)
- Train number(s): 20985 / 20986

On-board services
- Class(es): AC 2 tier, AC 3 tier, Sleeper class, General Unreserved
- Seating arrangements: No
- Sleeping arrangements: Yes
- Catering facilities: On-board catering, E-catering
- Observation facilities: Large windows
- Baggage facilities: No
- Other facilities: Below the seats

Technical
- Rolling stock: LHB coach
- Track gauge: 1,676 mm (5 ft 6 in)
- Operating speed: 50 km/h (31 mph) average including halts

The 20985 / 20986 Kota–MCTM Udhampur Weekly Superfast Express is an Express train belonging to West Central Railway zone that runs between Kota Junction and Udhampur in India. It is currently being operated with 19805/19806 train numbers on a weekly basis.

== See also ==
- Kota Junction railway station
- Udhampur railway station
- Kota–Shri Mata Vaishno Devi Katra Weekly Express
