= Howrah–Digha Super AC Express =

Train in India

Howrah-Digha Super AC Express
Overview
- Service type: Superfast Express
- First service: 10 October 2010
- Last service: 2023
- Current operator: South Eastern Railway

Route
- Termini: Howrah; Digha
- Stops: 3
- Distance travelled: 186 km (116 mi)
- Average journey time: 3 hours 10 minutes
- Service frequency: Daily
- Train number: 12847 / 12848

On-board services
- Classes: Executive Chair Car (EC), AC Chair Car (CC)
- Seating arrangements: Yes
- Sleeping arrangements: No
- Auto-rack arrangements: Overhead racks
- Catering facilities: E-catering
- Observation facilities: Large windows
- Baggage facilities: Available
- Other facilities: Below the seats

Technical
- Rolling stock: LHB coach
- Track gauge: 1,676 mm (5 ft 6 in)
- Operating speed: 62 km/h (39 mph) average including halts.

The 12847 / 12848 Howrah–Digha Super AC Express was a train of the shatabdi express category belonging to Indian Railways – South Eastern Railway zone that used to run between Howrah and Digha Flag station in India.

It operated as train number 12847 from Howrah Junction to Digha Flag station and as train number 12848 in the reverse direction, serving the state of West Bengal.

The train is now permanently cancelled most probably in the year 2023 after facing losses during Covid-19.

== Coaches ==
The 12847 / 48 Howrah–DighaAC Express had 1 Executive Class, 7 AC Chair Car and 2 End-on Generator cars.

It didn't have a pantry car.

Also earlier Howrah–Digha Super AC Express was running with 10 coaches which were ICF Duronto liveried.

As is customary with most train services in India, coach composition may be amended at the discretion of Indian Railways depending on demand.

== Service ==
The 12847 / 48 Howrah–Digha AC Express covers the distance of 186 kilometres in 03 hours 00 mins (62.00 km/h) in both directions.

As the average speed of the train is above 55 km/h (34 mph), as per Indian Railways rules, its fare includes a superfast surcharge. The train was earlier running with ICF coach with maximum speed of 110 km/h as AC Express in early type.

== Routeing & technical halts ==
The 12847 / 48 Howrah–Digha AC Express runs from Howrah via Mecheda, Tamluk Junction, Kanthi to Digha Flag station. It has three halts.

== Traction ==
As the route is fully electrified, it is hauled end to end by a Santragachi-based WAP-4 or WAP-7.

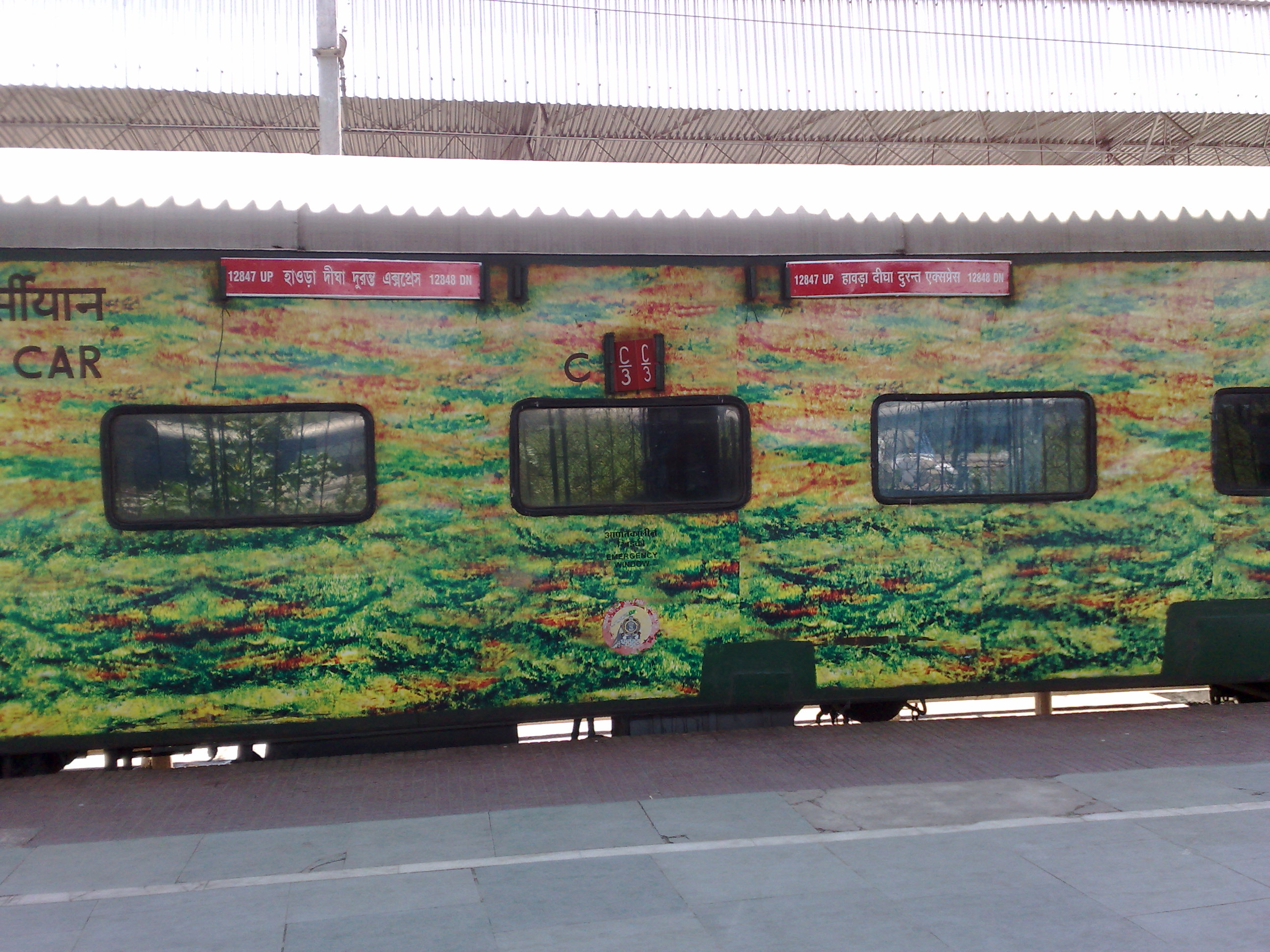
Howrah–Digha Duronto Express – AC Chair Car

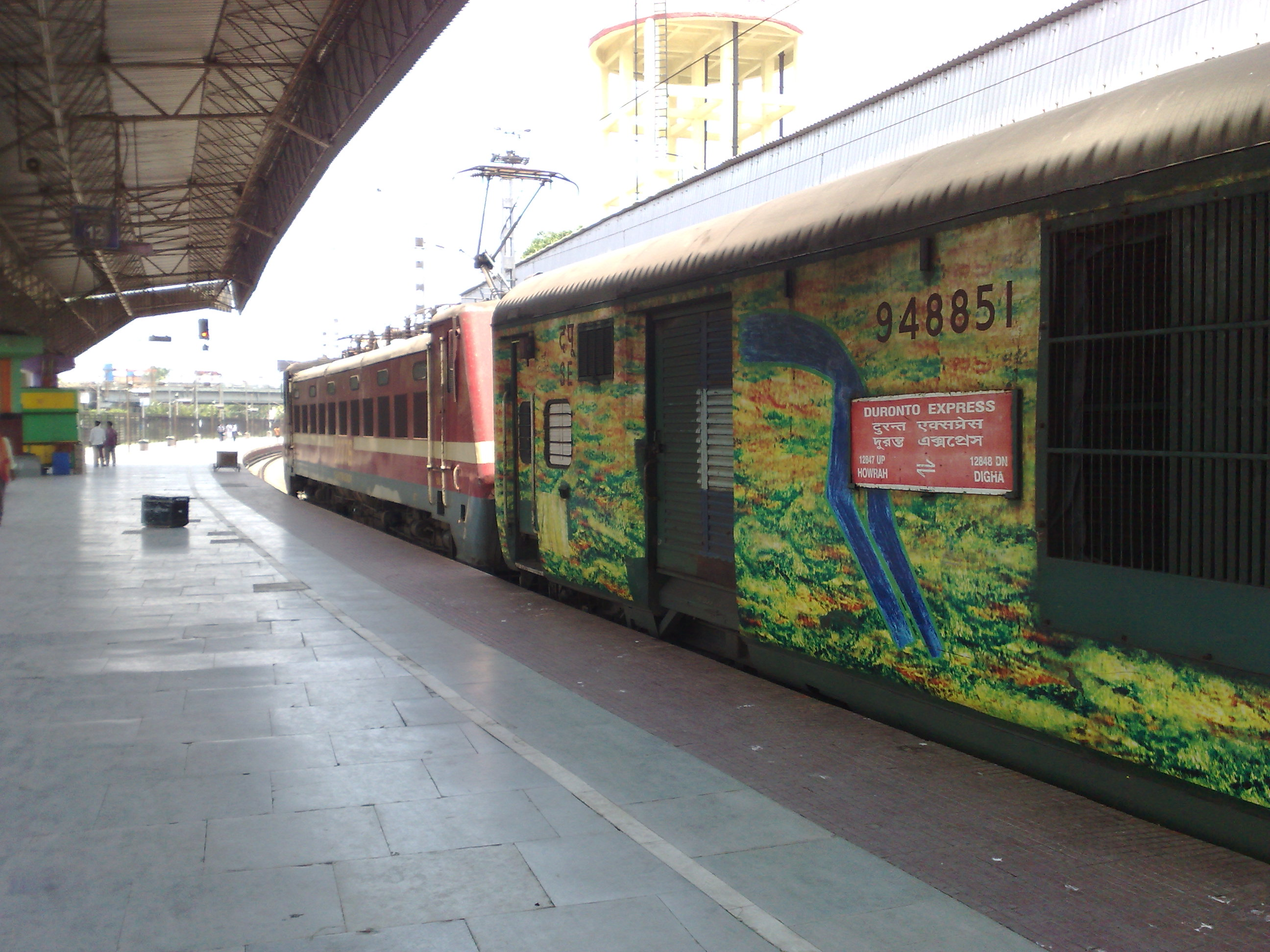
Howrah–Digha Duronto Express with Santragachi- based WAP-4

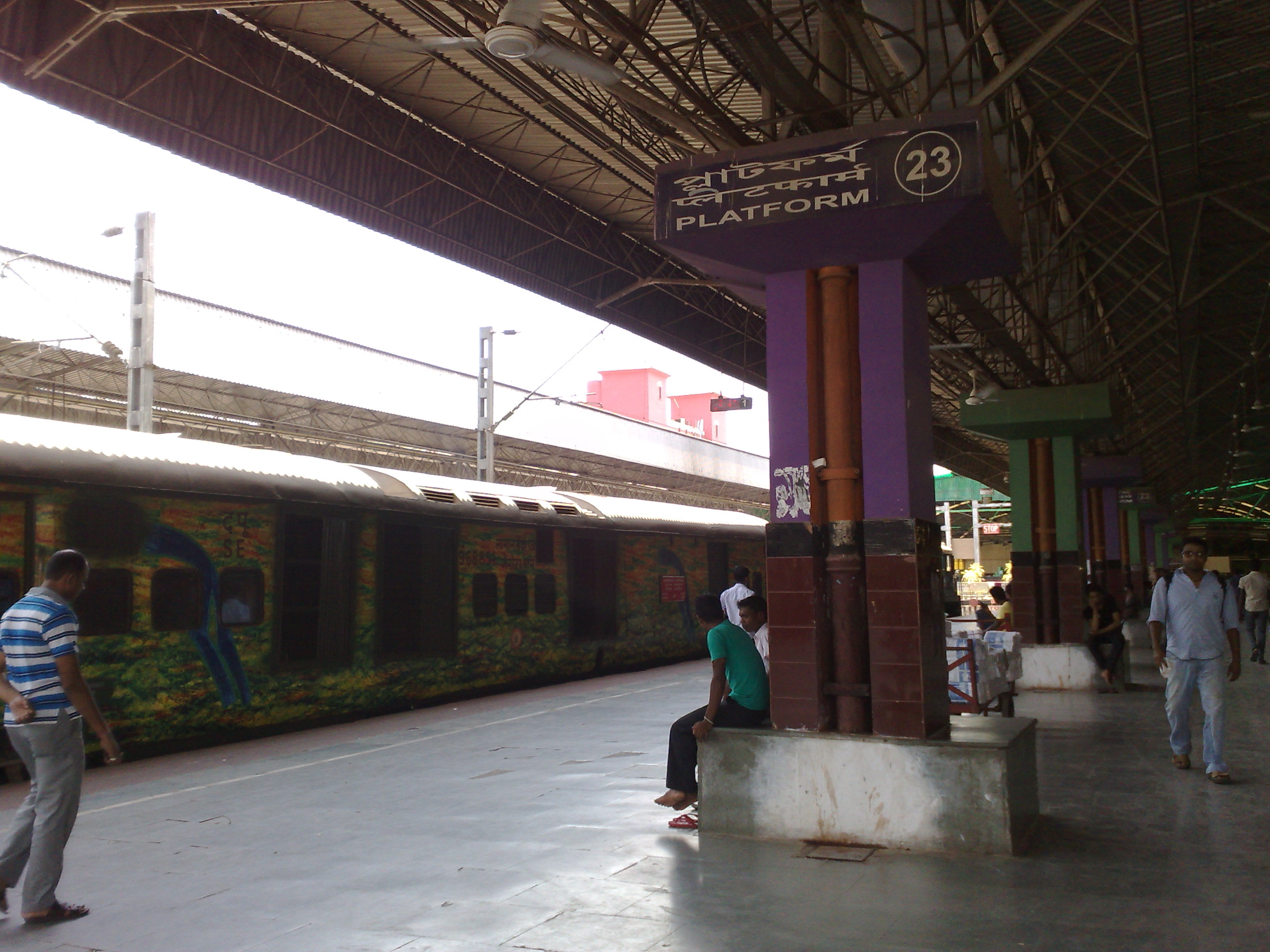
Howrah–Digha Duronto Express at Howrah Junction Platform 23

== Timings ==
- 12847 Howrah–Digha AC Express leaves Howrah Junction on a daily basis at 11:10 hrs IST and reaches Digha Flag station at 14:20 hrs IST the same day.
- 12848 Digha–Howrah AC Express leaves Digha Flag station on a daily basis at 15:30 hrs IST and reaches Howrah Junction at 18:40 hrs IST the same day.
