= Amritsar Shatabdi Express =

Shatabdi Express train in India

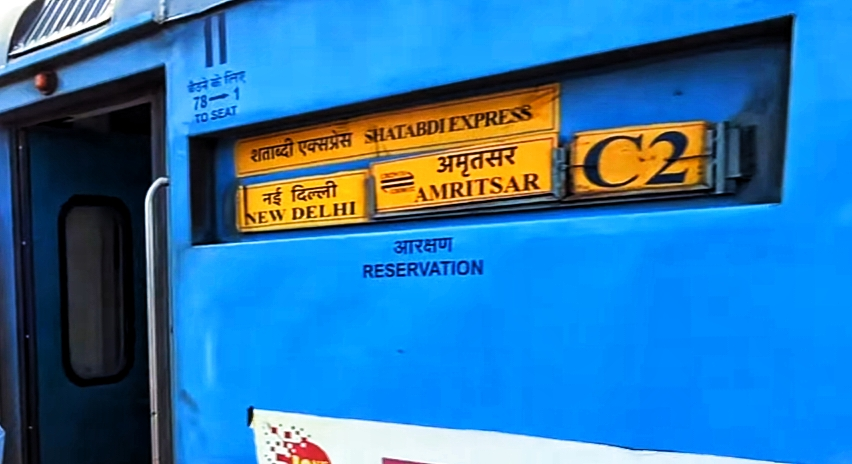
- Amritsar Shatabdi At Ambala Cantt

Overview
- Service type: Shatabdi Express
- Locale: Delhi, Haryana, Punjab
- First service: 11 August 1994; 32 years ago
- Current operator: Northern Railways

Route
- Termini: Amritsar Junction (ASR); New Delhi (NDLS)
- Stops: 6
- Distance travelled: 448 km (278 mi)
- Average journey time: 6 hours 05 minutes as 12029 New Delhi Amritsar Shatabdi Express, 6 hours 15 minutes as 12030 Amritsar New Delhi Shatabdi Express
- Service frequency: Daily
- Train number: 12013 / 12014

On-board services
- Classes: Executive Chair Car, AC Chair Car
- Seating arrangements: Yes
- Sleeping arrangements: No
- Catering facilities: Yes, No Pantry Car
- Observation facilities: LHB rakes
- Entertainment facilities: Large Windows
- Baggage facilities: Overhead racks

Technical
- Track gauge: 1,676 mm (5 ft 6 in)
- Operating speed: 130 km/h (80 mph) maximum 70.5 km/h (45 mph), including halts

The 12013/12014 Amritsar Shatabdi Express is a Superfast Express train of Shatabdi class belonging to Indian Railways that runs between Amritsar Junction and New Delhi in India. It is a daily service.

It operates as train number 12013 from New Delhi to Amritsar Junction and as train number 12014 in the reverse direction.

== Service ==
It is the fastest train on the Delhi – Amritsar sector after the newly launched Amritsar–Delhi Junction Vande Bharat Express and its two sister trains 12029/30 Amritsar Swarna Shatabdi Express and 12031/32 Amritsar Shatabdi Express. It has 2 sister trains 12029/30 New Delhi–Amritsar Swarna Shatabdi Express and 12031/32 New Delhi–Amritsar Shatabdi Express. It covers the distance of 448 kilometres in 6 hours 15 mins as 12013 Shatabdi Express (73.64 km/h) and 6 hours 15 mins as 12014 Shatabdi Express (71.68 km/h).

== Loco link ==
As the route is fully electrified, a Ghaziabad based WAP 7 or WAP-5 locomotive powers the train for the entire journey.
