= Modern Coach Factory, Raebareli =

Rail coach manufacturing unit in Uttar Pradesh

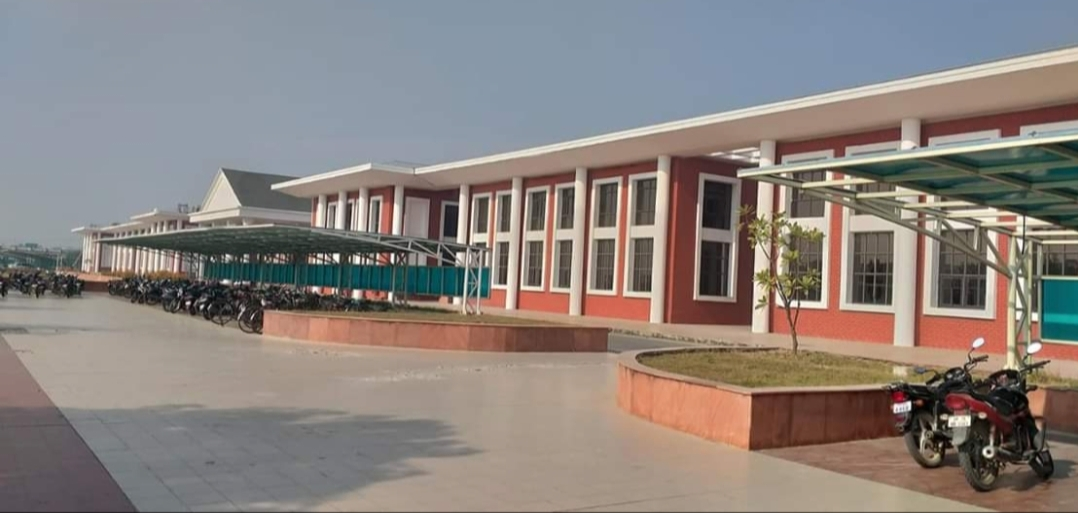
- MCF Head Office, Raebareli
- Type: Government
- Industry: Rail transport
- Founded: 2012; 14 years ago
- Headquarters: Raebareli, Uttar Pradesh, India
- Area served: Asia; Africa
- Key people: Raman Krishnan (General Manager)
- Products: Rolling stock Rail wheel
- Production output: 2025 coaches (2024–25)
- Owner: Indian Railways
- Number of employees: 2500 (approx.)
- Website: https://mcf.indianrailways.gov.in/

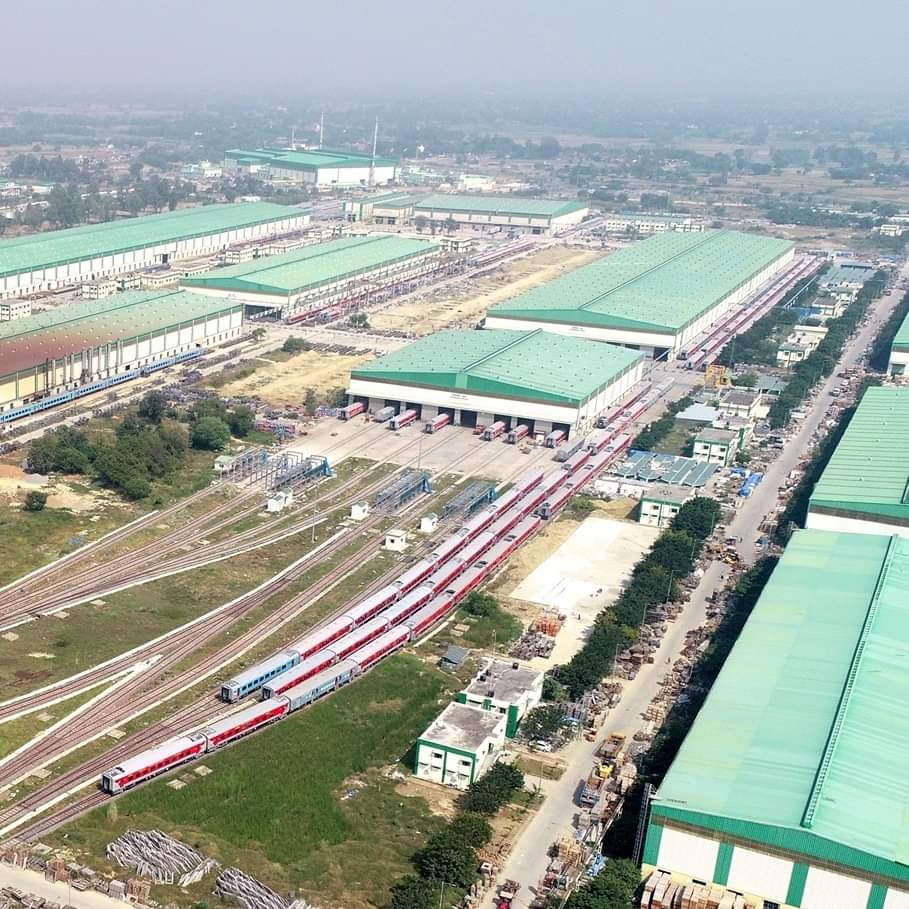
Aerial view of MCF, Raebareli

Modern Coach Factory, Raebareli (formerly Rail Coach Factory, Raebareli) or MCF Raebareli is a rail coach manufacturing unit of the Indian Railways at Lalganj near Raebareli in Uttar Pradesh. The factory is one of the coach production unit of Indian Railways besides the Integral Coach Factory at Perambur, Chennai in Tamil Nadu, Rail Coach Factory at Kapurthala in Punjab, Marathwada Rail Coach Factory in Latur, Maharashtra and Rail Coach Factory at Sonipat, Haryana. The factory was inaugurated on 7 November 2012. MCF Raebareli is one of the most advanced coach manufacturing unit of the world it is equipped with the many state of the art industrial robots and machines, on result making it require less manpower than other coach manufacturing units of Indian Railways.

== History ==
The project was approved in the Supplementary Railway Budget for 2006–07. Sonia Gandhi laid the foundation stone for the factory in February 2007 and land acquisition for the project commenced in April 2007. However, in 2008, following the victory of the Bahujan Samaj Party in the Uttar Pradesh elections of 2007, the new government under Chief Minister Mayawati cancelled the land deed for the factory halting construction work there. The Allahabad High Court permitted the project to proceed after a public interest litigation petition was filed before it. In January 2009, construction of the factory began again which was inaugurated once again by Sonia Gandhi. The same month, Indian Railways signed a 99-year land lease agreement with the Government of Uttar Pradesh. The delay led to the cost of the project rising from an initially estimated ₹1685 crores to about ₹2500 crores.

== Overview ==
The factory has come up on a total area of 541 hectares of land of which 283 was acquired from private parties. The factory was constructed by the IRCON International Limited. A total of 1,450 jobs are to be given to families that were affected by the land acquisition besides the compensation package and the Lucknow Division of the Northern Railways is expected to generate another 1,000 job opportunities as a result of the factory becoming operational. The factory adheres to stringent pollution control norms for curbing air pollution and spillage of oils and employs fume and sewage neutralisation systems.

== Production ==
The factory is expected to manufacture 1,000 Linke Holfmann Busch (LHB) coaches annually.

Anubhuti coaches, which are LHB coach, announced in the Railway Budget of 2013 are to be produced at the Rae Bareli coach factory. These coaches will progressively be introduced on the Shatabdi and Rajdhani Express trains.

The first completely in-house manufactured coach was turned out in August 2014. Since then, MCF has almost doubled its production year by year, starting from 140 coaches in 2014–15, to 285 coaches in 2015–16, then 576 coaches in 2016-17 and first time achieving the given production target of 710 coaches by manufacturing 711 coaches in 2017–18, MCF has turned out 1425 coaches in 2018–19 against a target of 1422 coaches. MCF also produced 1920 coaches in the year 2019–20. In spite of Low Production rate due to Locked Down, MCF has produced 1360 couches due to revised target in 2020–21. In year 2021-22 MCF produced 1875 coaches, in year 2022-23 it produced 1461, in year 2023-24 it produced 1684 and in year 2024-25 it produced 2025 coaches. Total of 13000 LHB coach have been rolled out by MCF Raebareli until 28 December 2024.

There is a proposal by MCF to make aluminium coaches potential to operate at speed of 250 km/h. The life of coach may go up to 40 years. This will be manufactured under Make in India initiative.

== Export ==
Nearly after 8 years of its commissioning Modern Coach Factory, Raebareli dispatched its first export quality train coaches to Mozambique, Africa in October 2020.

In June 2019, Mozambique Ports and Railways Authority signed an MoU with Indian railway's RITES (Rail India Technical and Economic Service) to procure 90 coaches, including 60 loco-hauled designed on LHB coach platform and 30 DEMU coaches designed and developed by ICF and RDSO.

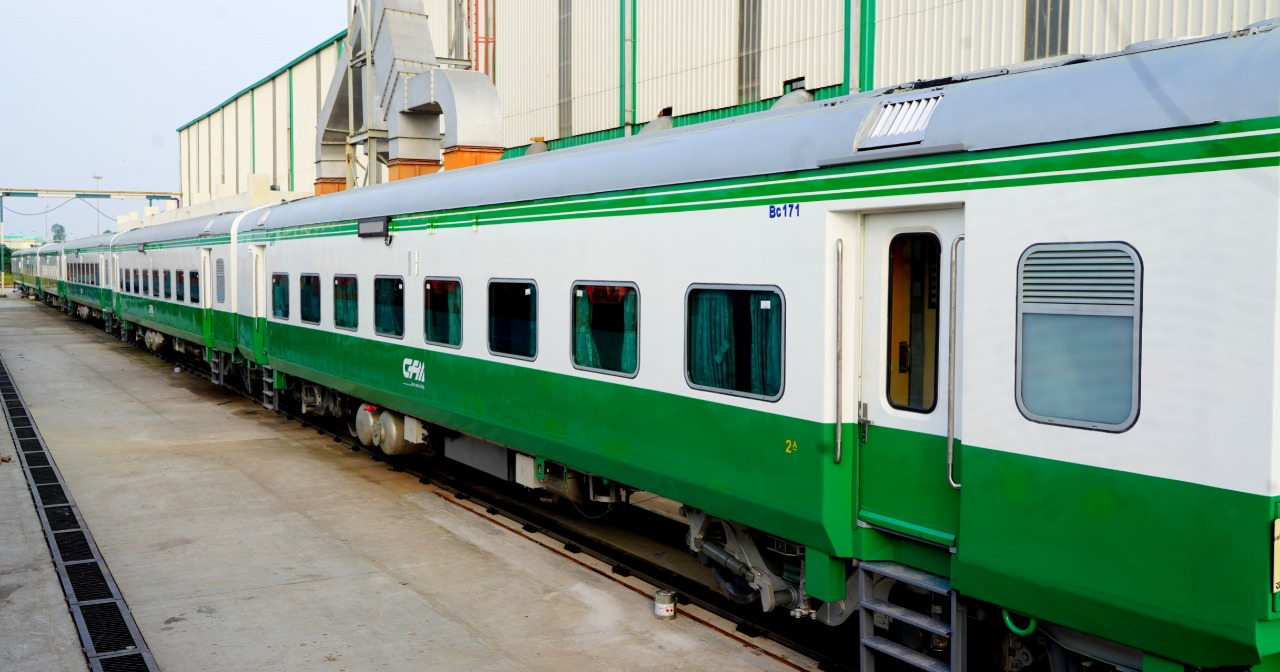
LHB coach for Mozambique ready to be rolled out

MCF, Raebareli first export consignment was to dispatch 12 locomotive-hauled coaches by October-end, these coaches were designed by Lucknow based RDSO and developed by MCF.

== See also ==
- Forged Wheel Plant
- Diesel Locomotive Factory, Marhowrah
- Electric Locomotive Factory, Madhepura
- Chittaranjan Locomotive Works, Asansol
- Banaras Locomotive Works, Varanasi
- Rail Wheel Plant, Bela
- Rail Wheel Factory, Yelahanka
- Titagarh Wagons, Titagarh
- List of locomotive builders by countries
