= Kanpur–New Delhi Shatabdi Express =

Shatabdi Express train in India

12034 New Delhi Kanpur Shatabdi express Lucknow
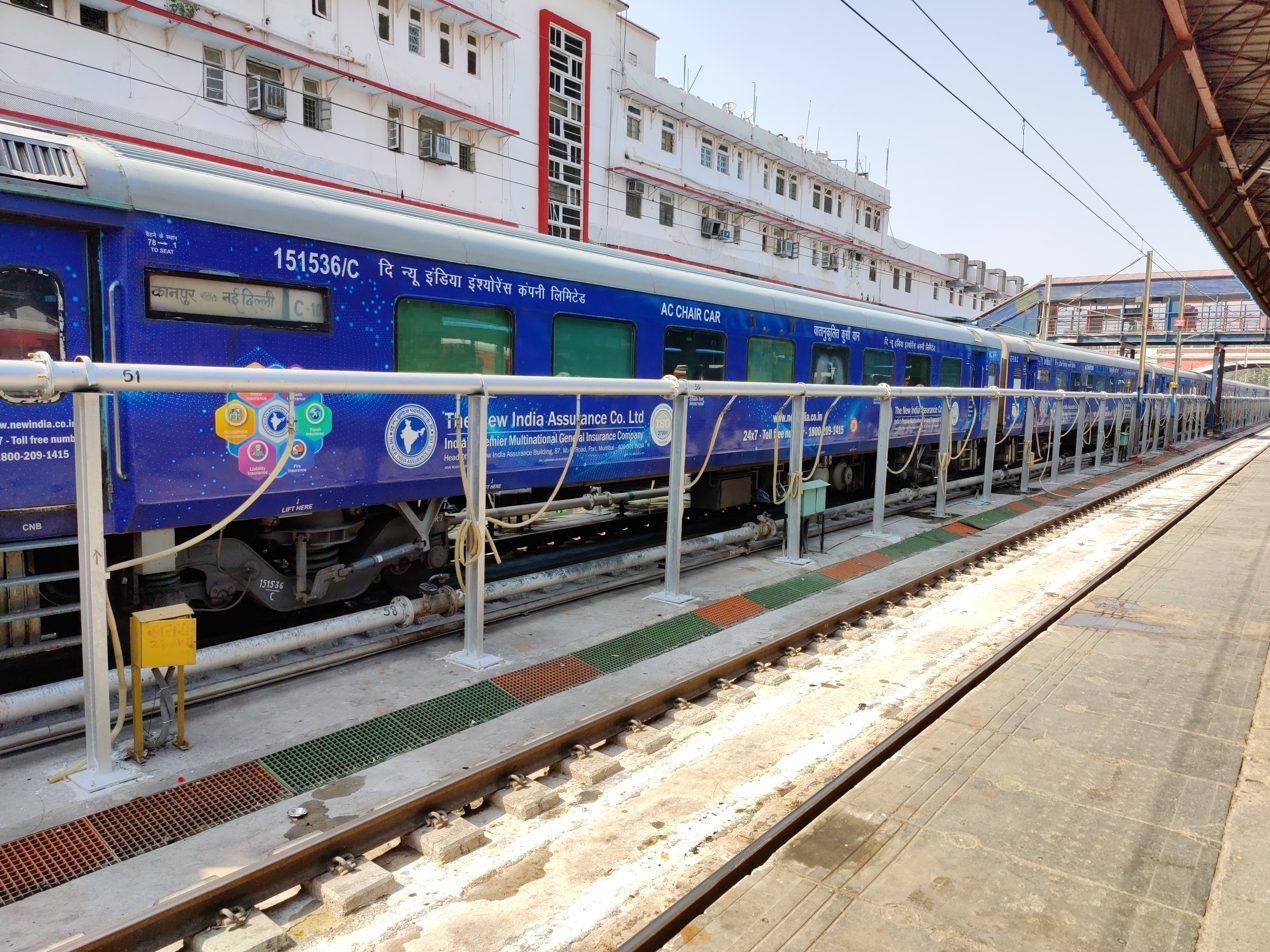
- Kanpur–New Delhi Shatabdi Express at New Delhi railway station.

Overview
- Service type: Shatabdi Express
- Locale: Delhi & Uttar Pradesh
- First service: 7 February 2010; 16 years ago
- Current operator: North Central Railways

Route
- Termini: Kanpur Central (CNB); New Delhi (NDLS)
- Stops: 3
- Distance travelled: 440 km (273 mi)
- Average journey time: 5 hours 15 minutes
- Service frequency: 6 days a week (Note: Except Sundays)
- Train number: 12033 / 12034
- Line used: Kanpur–Delhi line (till New Delhi)

On-board services
- Classes: Executive Chair Car, AC Chair Car
- Seating arrangements: Yes
- Sleeping arrangements: No
- Catering facilities: On-board catering E-catering
- Observation facilities: Large windows
- Baggage facilities: Overhead racks

Technical
- Rolling stock: LHB coach
- Track gauge: 1,676 mm (5 ft 6 in)
- Electrification: Yes
- Operating speed: 130 km/h (81 mph) maximum, 90 km/h (56 mph) average including halts
Route map
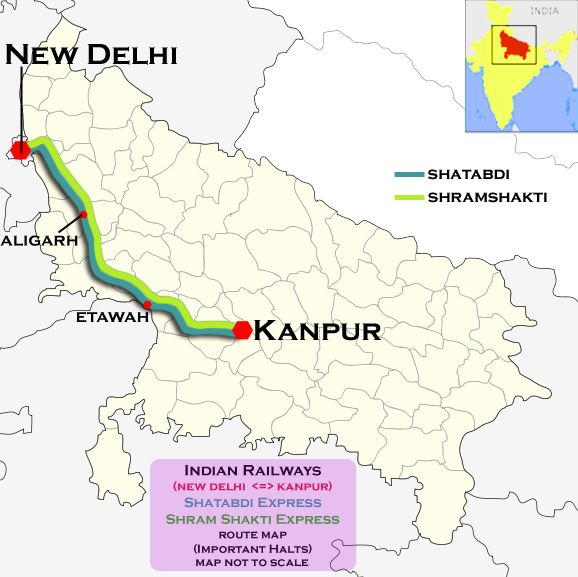

The 12033 / 12034 Kanpur–New Delhi Shatabdi Express is the Shatabdi train connecting Kanpur Central with New Delhi. It is the Fastest Shatabdi in India following Rani Kamalapati-New Delhi Shatabdi Express. The load of passengers in Lucknow Swarna Shatabdi Express was heavy from Kanpur Central. Due to the excessive passenger load on Lucknow Shatabdi from Kanpur Central and huge demand for a separate Shatabdi train from Kanpur Central, the Railway Ministry declared the new Shatabdi train from Central Station in 2009 Railway Budget. This train was flagged off by Union Railways minister Mamata Banerjee on 7 February 2010. It runs on all days of a week except Sunday. It was the Fastest Train in India from 1 January 2014 to 31 August 2014 at Commercial Speed of 88.5 km/h.

In its initial days, it used to run non-stop between Kanpur and New Delhi. Later, Ghaziabad and Etawah were added as intermediate stops and from 9 July 2016 Aligarh was also added in UP Direction and from 10 February 2025, Aligarh is also added in DN Direction.

It is called Kanpur Reverse Shatabdi because it follows the reverse timetable of Lucknow Shatabdi; i.e. UP follows DOWN time table and vice versa.

== Halts ==
=== 12033 ===
Running days: 'MON TUE WED THU FRI SAT'

Station code	Station name	Departure time (IST)	Distance (km)	Day
CNB	Kanpur Central	6:00 AM	0 (Source)	Day 1
EWT	Etawah Junction	7:21 AM	139	Day 1
ALJN	Aligarh Junction	9:05 AM	309	Day 1
GZB	Ghaziabad Junction	10:33 AM	415	Day 1
NDLS	New Delhi	11:20 AM	440 (Destination)	Day 1

=== 12034 ===
Running days: 'MON TUE WED THU FRI SAT'

Station code	Station name	Departure time (IST)	Distance (km)	Day
NDLS	New Delhi	3:40 PM	0 (Source)	Day 1
GZB	Ghaziabad Junction	4:14 PM	26	Day 1
ALJN	Aligarh Junction	5:20 PM	132	Day 1
EWT	Etawah Junction	7:07 PM	301	Day 1
CNB	Kanpur Central	8:50 PM	440 (Destination)	Day 1

== Fares and coaches ==
These fares are lesser as compared to the Lucknow Swarn Shatabdi Express for the same pair of stations. Morning/evening snacks, tea and coffee are served.

	1	2	3	4	5	6	7	8	9	10	11	12	13	14	15	16	17	18	19
12033		EOG	C1	C2	C3	C4	C5	C6	C7	C8	C9	C10	C11	C12	C13	C14	C15	E1	EOG
12034		EOG	E1	C15	C14	C13	C12	C11	C10	C9	C8	C7	C6	C5	C4	C3	C2	C1	EOG

== Loco link ==
Ghaziabad / Kanpur-based WAP-7 (HOG)-equipped locomotive are used to haul the train for its entire journey.

== See also ==
- Lucknow Swarna Shatabdi
- Shram Shakti Express
- Express trains in India
- Dedicated Intercity trains of India
