= ICF coach =

Type of coach used by Indian Railways

Integral Coach Factory (ICF) coach
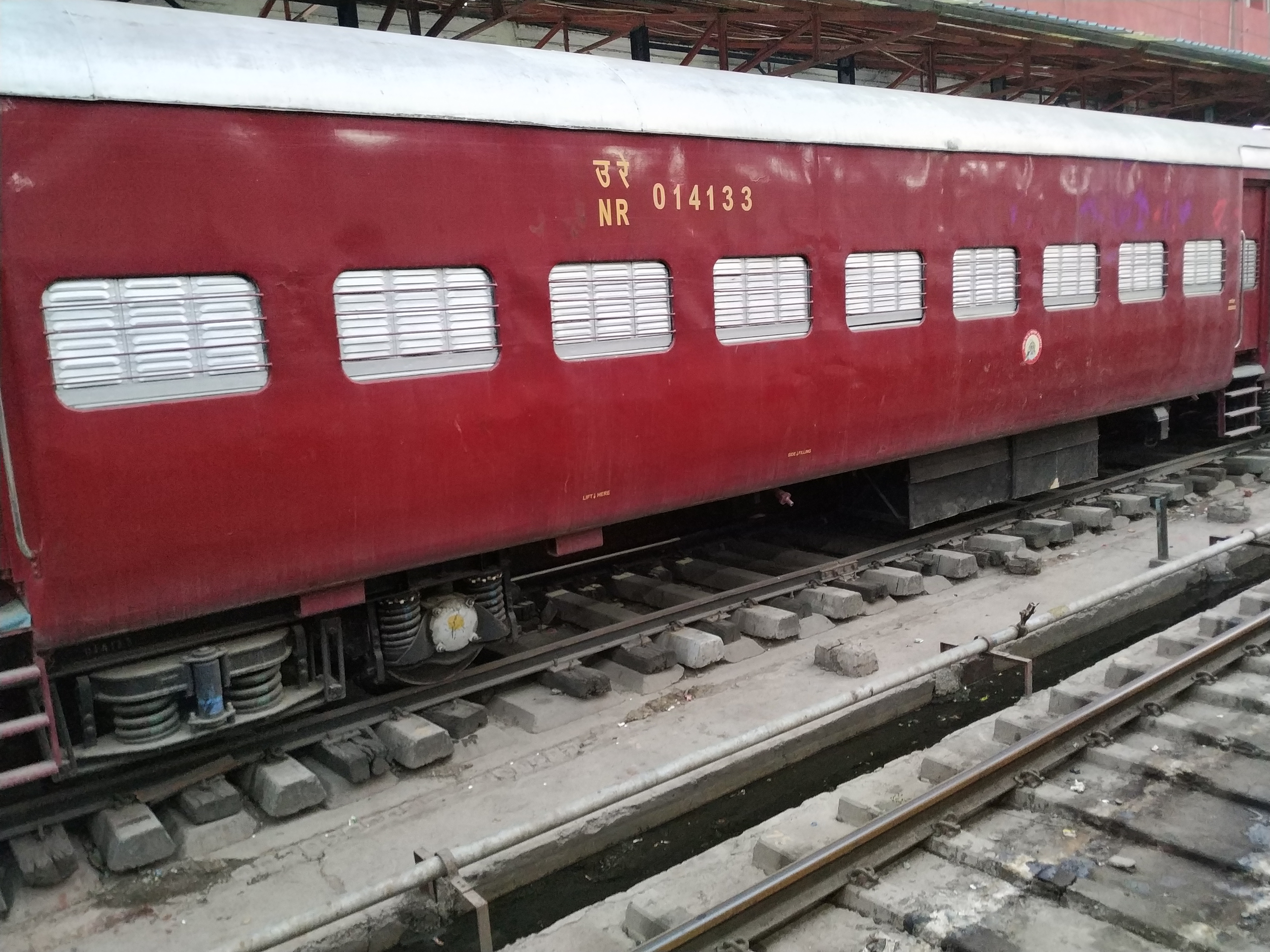
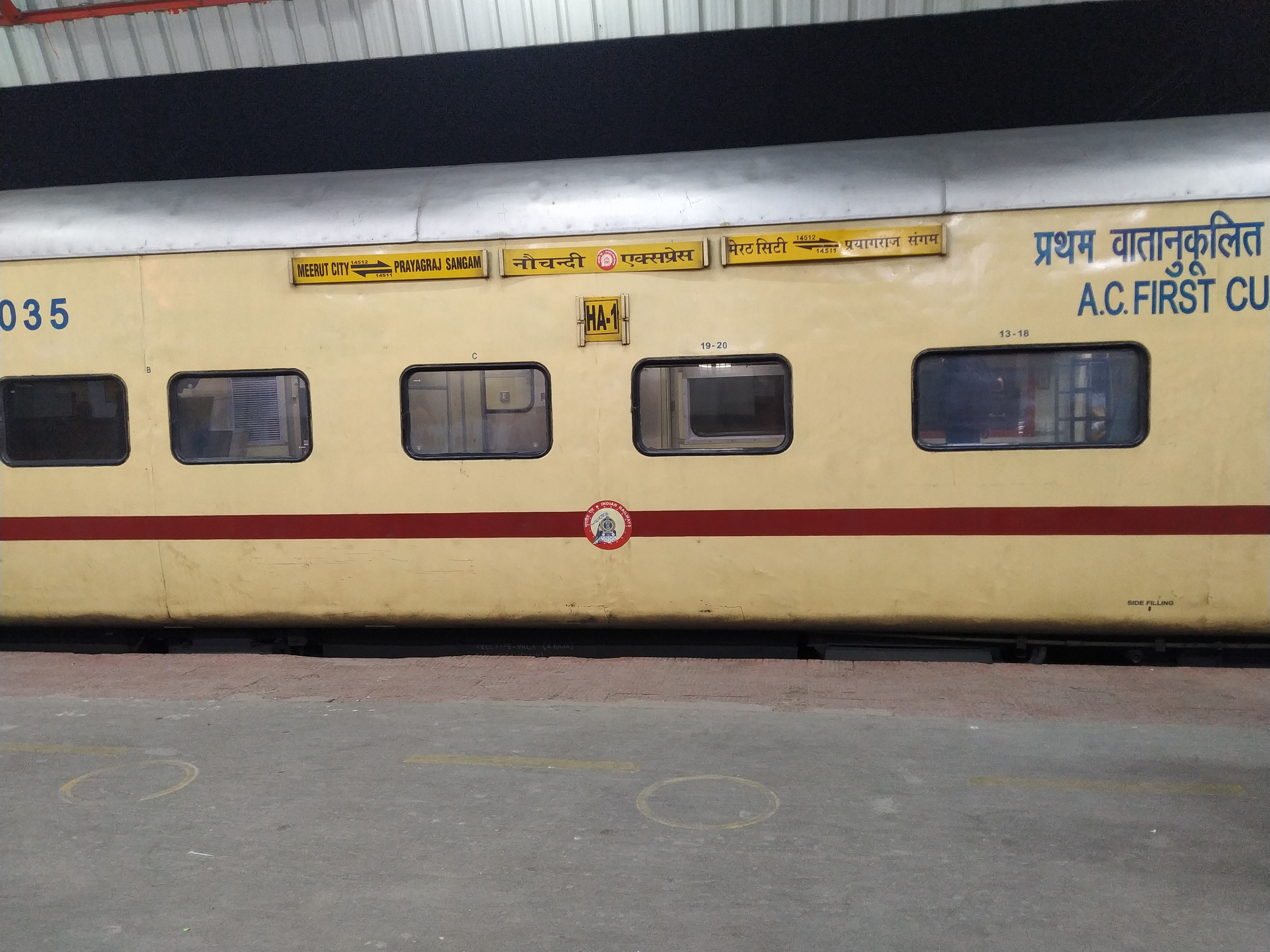
- ICF coaches in various paint schemes
- Designers: Swiss Cars and Elevator Manufacturing Co. Integral Coach Factory
- Built at: Integral Coach Factory, Chennai; Rail Coach Factory, Kapurthala; BEML Limited, Bangalore
- Replaced: British-era coaches from the pre-nationalization period
- Constructed: 2 October 1955–19 January 2018
- Number built: 54,000+
- Successor: LHB coach (IR); 7A-2000 coaches (PNR)
- Operators: List: Indian Railways; Angola Railway; Bangladesh Railway; Mozambique Railway; Nigerian Railway Corporation; Philippine National Railways; Sri Lanka Railway; Taiwan Railway; Tanzania Railways Corporation; Uganda Railways Corporation; Vietnam Railways; Zambia Railway

Specifications
- Car body construction: Stainless steel and Weathering steel
- Car length: 22,297 mm (73 ft 1.8 in) over buffers
- Width: 3,245 mm (10 ft 7.8 in)
- Height: 4,025 mm (13 ft 2.5 in)
- Floor height: 1,313 mm (4 ft 3.7 in)
- Wheelbase: 14,783 mm (48 ft 6.0 in)
- Maximum speed: 110–140 km/h (68–87 mph) (Note: The ICF coaches had a designated maximum permissible speed of 110 km/h (68 mph). However, trains running with modified ICF coaches reached speeds of up to 130 km/h (81 mph) for Rajdhani Express, and up to 140 km/h (87 mph) for Shatabdi Express.)
- UIC classification: 2'2'
- Bogies: ICF Bogies
- Minimum turning radius: 152.4 m (500 ft)
- Braking systems: Vacuum (1950s-1990s); Air (1990s-present)
- Coupling system: Buffers and chain coupler, Knuckle coupler
- Track gauge: 1,676 mm (5 ft 6 in)

The Integral Coach Factory (ICF) coach is a conventional passenger rail coach developed and manufactured by the Indian state owned Integral Coach Factory in Chennai. First manufactured in 1955, it was extensively used by the Indian Railways till the late 1990s. When the production ceased in 2018, more than 54,000 coaches had been produced including exports to other countries.

== History ==
The coach design was developed by Integral Coach Factory (ICF) in Perambur, Chennai in collaboration with the Swiss Car and Elevator Manufacturing Co. from Schlieren in Switzerland. An Indian delegation made initial contacts with the Swiss manufacturer at a railway congress in Lucerne in 1947. In the railway budget for 1949–50, the Indian government announced the intention to establish a railway coach factory in India. In 1949, a technical agreement was concluded with the Swiss based company for technical assistance and transfer of coach building technology. A basic steel shell was designed as a prototype by the Swiss company which formed the basis of the ICF coaches manufactured in the new facility. The factory rolled out the first ICF coach on 2 October 1955. The last ICF coach was flagged off on 19 January 2018. By the time the production ceased in 2018, ICF had manufactured more than 54,000 coaches.

In April 2018, the Indian Railways launched a refurbishment programme called Utkrisht (excellence) to refurbish and modernise ICF coaches in 640 rakes at a cost of ₹4 billion (equivalent to ₹12 billion or US$130 million in 2026). The refurbishment included a new beige and maroon paint scheme, installation of LED fixtures, bio-toilets, assistive braille signage, and improved trash disposal. Some of the ICF coaches were converted into accident relief vans and automobile carrier rakes.

== Operators ==
The ICF coach was extensively used by the Indian Railways till the late 1990s. The ICF coaches were gradually replaced by LHB coaches designed by Linke-Hofmann-Busch of Germany. About 601 coaches were exported to countries such as Taiwan, Zambia, Tanzania, Uganda, Vietnam, Nigeria, Bangladesh, Mozambique, Angola and Sri Lanka. Philippine National Railways had 60 ICF coaches delivered between 1975 and 1979, and withdrew the last of its ICF coaches from service in 2009.

== Liveries ==
=== Standard ===
The ICF coaches were painted with a brick red livery since their introduction in 1955. They were repainted blue in the 1990s, and in beige and red since 2018.

Brick Red Livery (1955–1990s)

Blue Livery (1990s–2018)

Utkrisht Livery (2018–present)

Select classes of trains such as Rajdhani, Shatabdi, Garib Rath and Duronto used ICF coaches with special paint schemes.

Rajdhani Livery (1969–2016)

Shatabdi Livery (1988–2019)

Garib Rath Livery (2006–2024)

Duronto Livery (2009–2020)
