= Lucknow–New Delhi Swarna Shatabdi Express =

Train in India

Lucknow Swarna Shatabdi Express
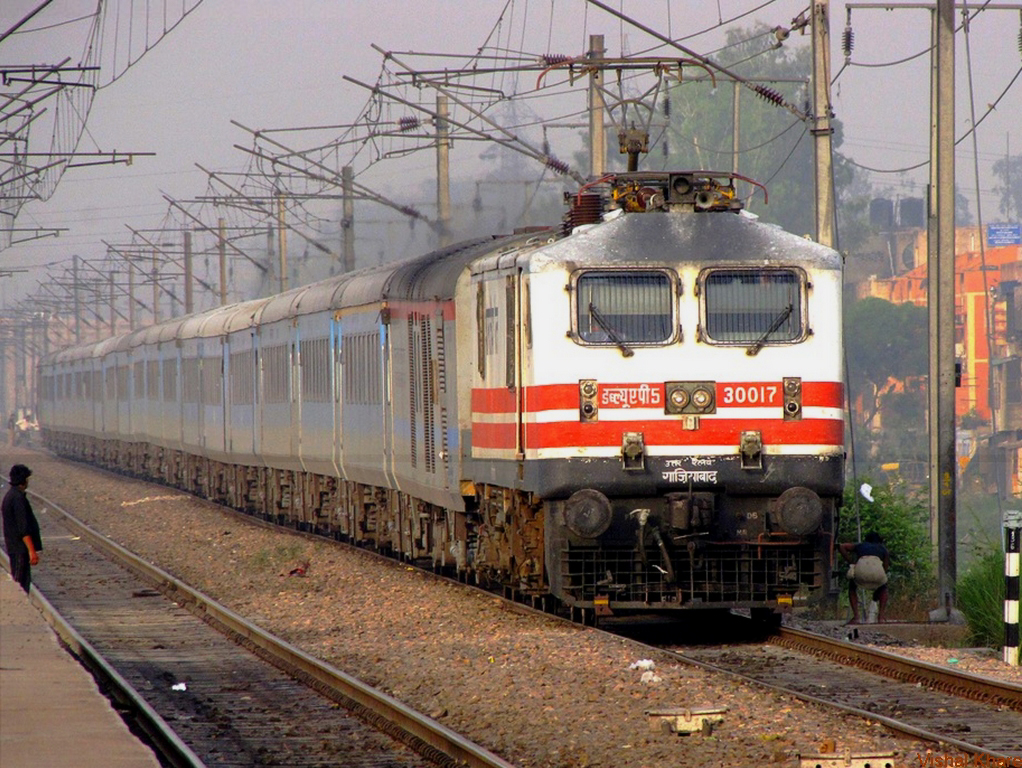

Overview
- Service type: Shatabdi Express
- Locale: Delhi & Uttar Pradesh
- First service: 24 March 1989; 37 years ago
- Current operators: Northern Railway of Indian Railways

Route
- Termini: Lucknow Junction; New Delhi
- Stops: 5
- Distance travelled: 512 km (318 mi)
- Average journey time: 6 hours 50 minutes
- Service frequency: Daily
- Train number: 12003/12004
- Lines used: Lucknow Jn.–Kanpur; Kanpur–Delhi line (till New Delhi)

On-board services
- Classes: AC Executive Anubhuti Chair Car; AC First Class Chair Car; AC Chair Car
- Seating arrangements: Chair Car
- Sleeping arrangements: Not available
- Catering facilities: Vegetarian food Non-vegetarian food Jain food
- Baggage facilities: Overhead luggage shelves

Technical
- Rolling stock: Alstom LHB coach
- Track gauge: 1,676 mm (5 ft 6 in)
- Operating speed: Maximum: 130 km/h (81 mph); Average: 75 km/h (47 mph)
Route map
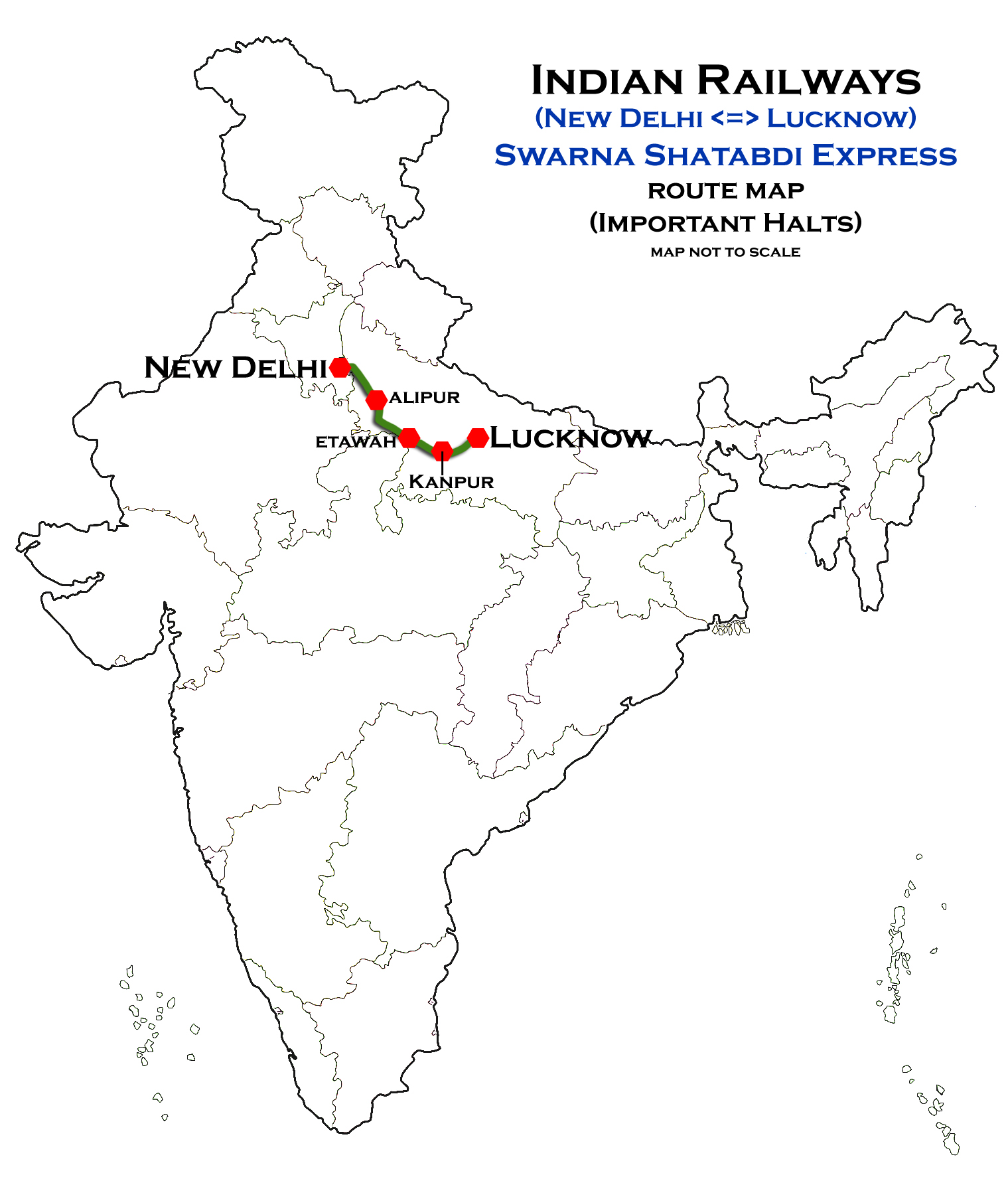

Lucknow Swarna Shatabdi Express is one of the Shatabdi Express trains operated by Indian Railways that connects the capital of India, New Delhi to the state capital of Uttar Pradesh, Lucknow Junction.

== Overview ==
This train is a Swarna category Shatabdi Express train. Swarna is a Sanskrit word meaning gold. Swarna Shatabdi means that it caters better amenities to passengers and also generates better revenue for Indian Railways as compared to other Shatabdi Express trains. Not every train in Indian Railways carries the Swarna tag. It is hauled by an Electric Loco Shed, Ghaziabad WAP-7 Locomotive.

== History ==
Earlier this train used to run between Kanpur Central and New Delhi non-stop, a 440 km stretch. After the gauge conversion in 1993, it was extended and previous terminal, Kanpur Central was converted to its only halt and later halted at Aligarh. Later on, it was also given halt at Ghaziabad, Etawah and further Tundla also was added.Phaphund was also added. Unnao was also added. Lucknow Swarna Shatabdi Express is the first train in Indian Railways to get LHB coach on trial basis.

== Terminal change ==
Beginning from 29 April 2014, this train terminal has shifted from Lucknow Lucknow Charbagh NR (known as "Badi Line" in Lucknow Railway Station and owned by Northern Railway Zone) to Lucknow Lucknow Junction NER (known as "Chotti Line" in Lucknow Railway Station and owned by North Eastern Railway Zone) to decongest the main Lucknow Charbagh Railway Station that falls under the Northern Railway Zone of Indian Railways.

== Route and halts ==
- New Delhi
- Ghaziabad Junction
- Aligarh Junction
- Tundla Junction
- Etawah Junction
- Phaphund
- Kanpur Central
- Unnao Junction
- Lucknow Junction

== Traction ==
This train is hauled by the Ghaziabad WAP-7 for its journey.

== Coach composition ==
This was the first train in India to get morden LHB coaches. The coach composition of this train is:

- 2 AC Executive Class coaches
- 16 chair car coaches
- 2 EOG brake and kuggage coaches

== Initiatives ==
Lucknow Swarna Shatabdi has been awarded the ISO certification.

== Coach positioning ==
The coach positioning of this train at New Delhi Station is:

- LOCO-EOG-E1-E2-C1-C2-C3-C4-C5-C6-C7-C8-C9-C10-C11-C12-C13-C14-C15-C16-EOG
- Vice versa coach positioning at Lucknow Junction station

== See also ==
- Lucknow Charbagh railway station (LKO)
- Kanpur Shatabdi
- Aligarh Junction railway station
