= Gatiman Express =

Semi-high speed train by Indian Railways

Gatimaan Express
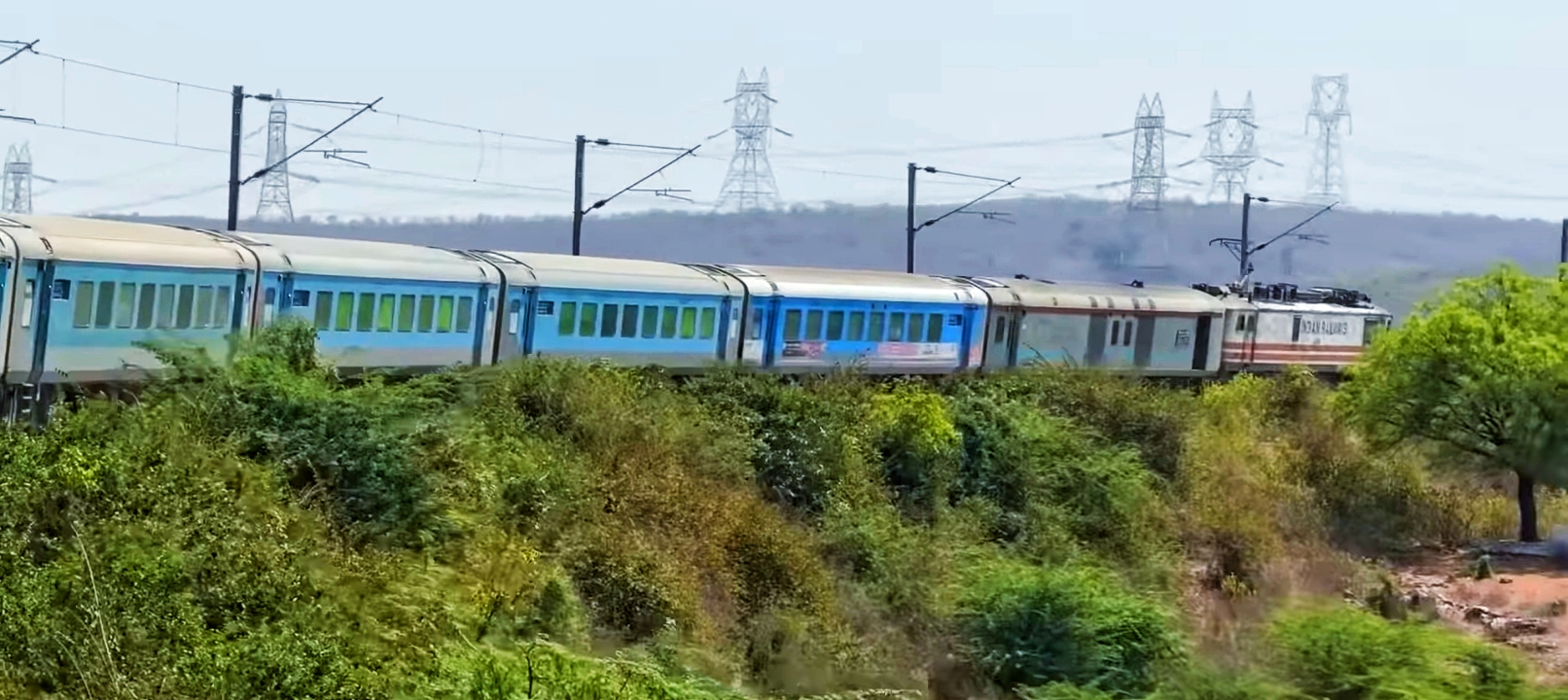
- Gatimaan Express approaching Gwalior Junction near Kati Ghati

Overview
- Service type: Shatabdi Express
- Status: Operational
- First service: 5 April 2016; 10 years ago (inaugural run); 19 February 2018; 8 years ago (extended to Gwalior Junction); 1 April 2018; 8 years ago (extended to Virangana Lakshmibai Junction)
- Current operators: Indian Railways & IRCTC
- Website: https://indianrailways.gov.in/

Route
- Termini: Hazrat Nizamuddin (NZM); Virangana Lakshmibai Jhansi Junction (VGLJ)
- Stops: Agra Cantt; Gwalior Junction
- Distance travelled: 403 km (250 mi)
- Service frequency: 6 days a week (except Friday)
- Train number: 12049 / 12050

On-board services
- Classes: AC Chair Car (CC), Executive class (EC)
- Seating arrangements: Yes
- Sleeping arrangements: No
- Auto-rack arrangements: Overhead racks
- Catering facilities: Yes
- Observation facilities: Large windows
- Baggage facilities: Available
- Other facilities: Wi-Fi; Smoke alarms Passenger information system

Technical
- Rolling stock: LHB coach
- Track gauge: 1,676 mm (5 ft 6 in); Broad gauge
- Operating speed: 91 km/h (57 mph) average including halts

The 12049 / 12050 Gatimaan Express is an express train run by Indian Railways. It connects Hazrat Nizamuddin in Delhi and Jhansi railway stations via the Delhi-Jhansi sector, India's busiest rail line. It is a Shatabdi category express service running via Agra Cantt and Gwalior Junction stations, and currently the second fastest train service in India, after the Namo Bharat.

== Operations ==
The Gatiman Express is most commonly made up of a WAP-5 locomotive, 12 passenger cars, and 1-2 brake vans. The train covers the 403 km (250 mi) journey in 4 hours 25 minutes at an average speed of 91 km/h (57 mph). As of 2024, the train achieves the maximum operational speed achieved by any operating train in India with a speed of 160 km/h (99 mph) on the Tughlakabad–Agra section. The train runs six days a week, and not on Fridays.

In October 2014, Indian Railways applied for a safety certificate from the Commission of Railway Safety to start the service. The train was officially announced in June 2015. The first service ran on 5 April 2016 from Hazrat Nizamuddin and Agra Cantonment. The train was extended from Agra to Gwalior on 19 February 2018 and then to Virangana Lakshmibai junction on 1 April 2018.

== Incidents ==
As of 2026, there have been no reported casualties on board the train.

- In 2016, a Delhi-bound train suffered damage to its pantograph during a thunderstorm, halting the train between Baad and Mathura Junction.
- In 2024, the crew violated the advisory speed limits between Jajau and Mania railway stations. In June 2024, the maximum speed of the train was reduced from 160 km/h to 130 km/h until the installation of the Kavach autonomous train protection system on the route.

== See also ==
- High-speed rail in India
