= Pune–Secunderabad Shatabdi Express =

Shatabdi Express train in India

Pune Junction – Hyderabad Deccan Nampally Shatabdi Express
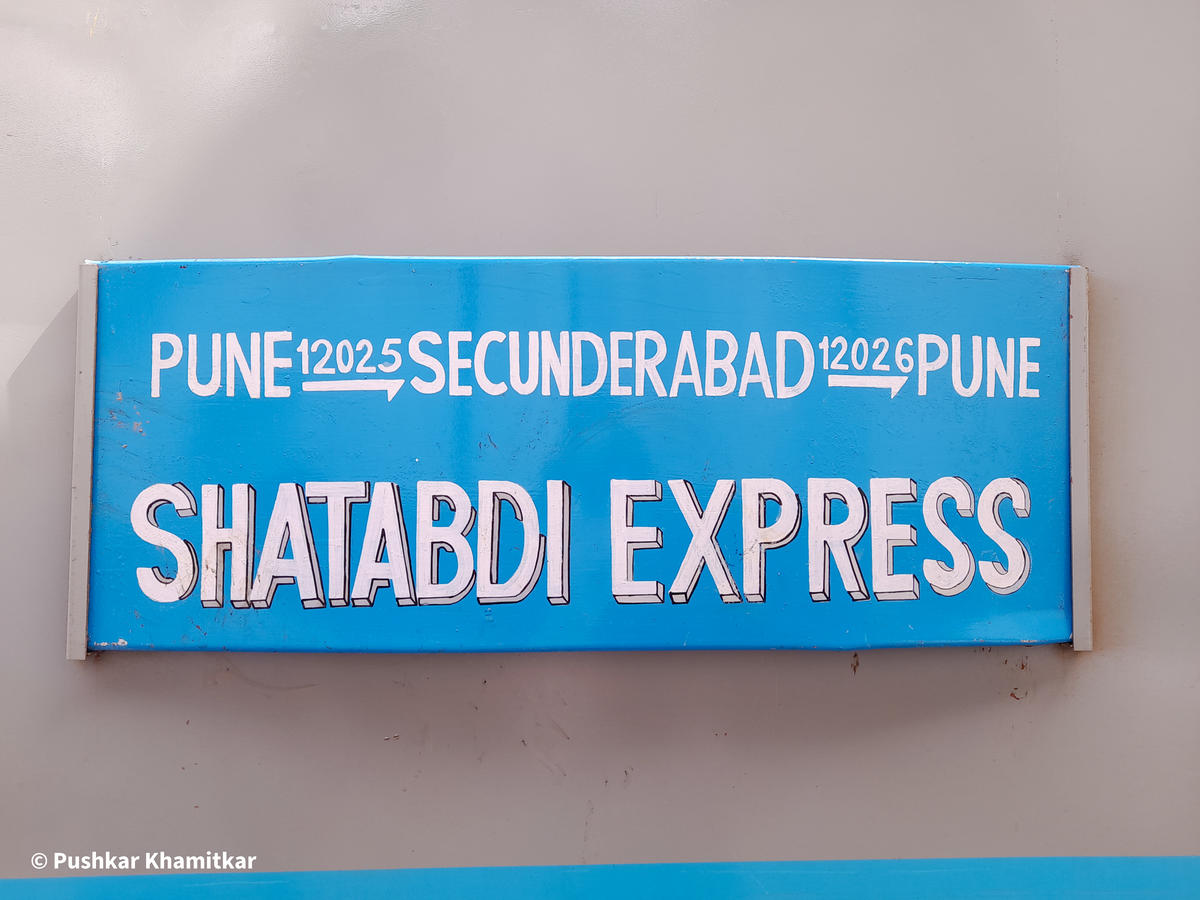

Overview
- Service type: Shatabdi Express
- Locale: Maharashtra, Karnataka and Telangana
- First service: 13 November 2011; 14 years ago
- Current operator: Central Railways

Route
- Termini: Pune Junction (PUNE); Hyderabad Deccan (HYB)
- Stops: 6
- Distance travelled: 597 km (371 mi)
- Average journey time: 8 hours 20 minutes
- Service frequency: Daily except Tuesdays
- Train number: 12025 / 12026

On-board services
- Classes: AC Chair Car, Executive Class
- Seating arrangements: Yes
- Sleeping arrangements: No
- Catering facilities: On-board Catering; E-Catering
- Observation facilities: Large windows
- Baggage facilities: Overhead racks

Technical
- Rolling stock: LHB coach
- Track gauge: 1,676 mm (5 ft 6 in)
- Operating speed: 70.58 km/h (44 mph) average including halts

The 12025 / 12026 Pune – Hyderabad Deccan Nampally Shatabdi Express is a train operated by the Central Railway which is running between Pune Junction in Maharashtra and Hyderabad Deccan in Telangana. The train commenced service on 13 November 2011. The train runs at an average speed of 70.58 km/h and was the fastest diesel hauled shatabdi train on IR and also the fastest train connecting these two cities. The train travels from Pune Junction to Hyderabad Deccan in 8 hours and 30 mins as 12025 Shatabdi Express (70.23 km/h) and 8 hours 25 mins as 12026 Shatabdi Express.

Now since the whole route is electrified, it runs with electric locomotive end to end.

== Traction ==
Earlier it was hauled by WDP-4D , WDM-3D and WDM-3A. Now , Both trains are hauled by a Lallaguda Loco Shed based WAP-7 electric locomotive end to end.

== Gallery ==
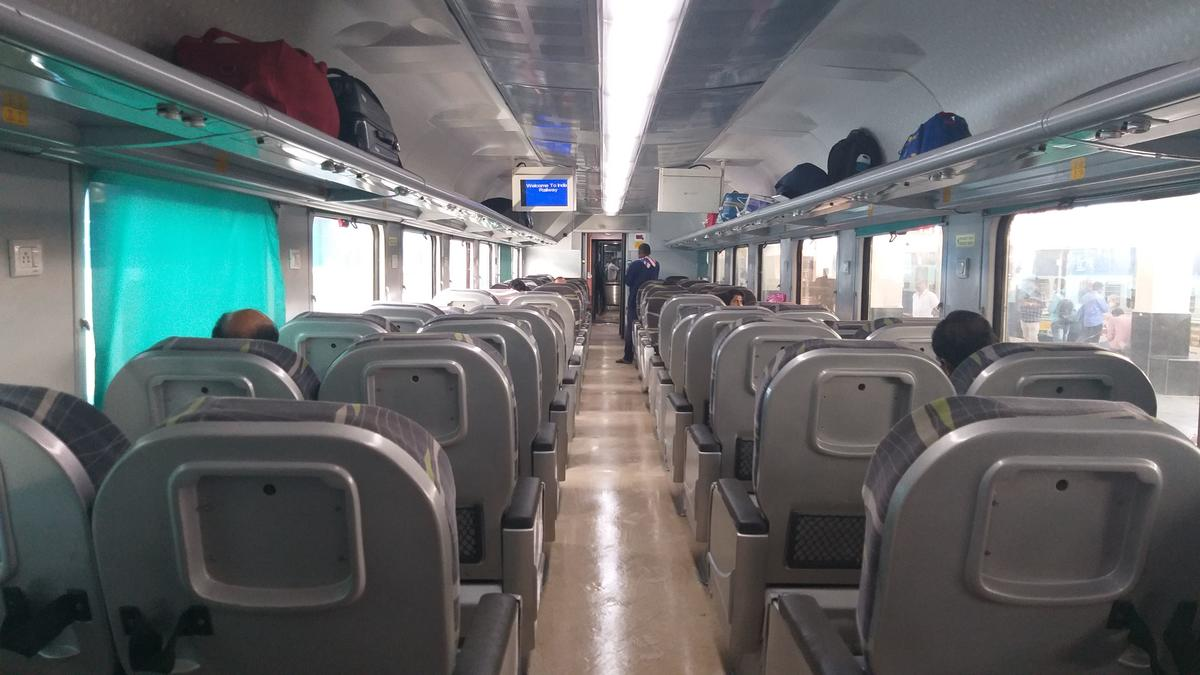
Ac chair car

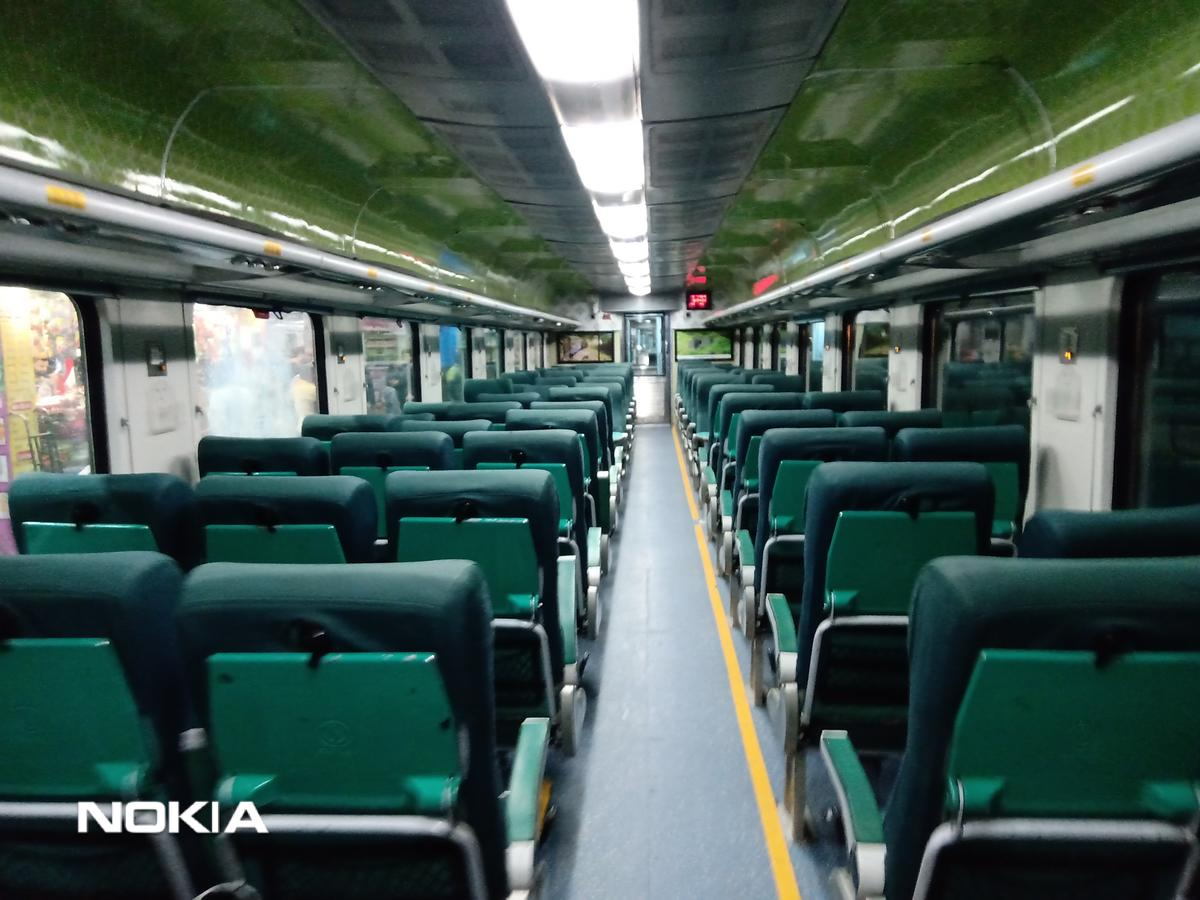
Executive Chair car

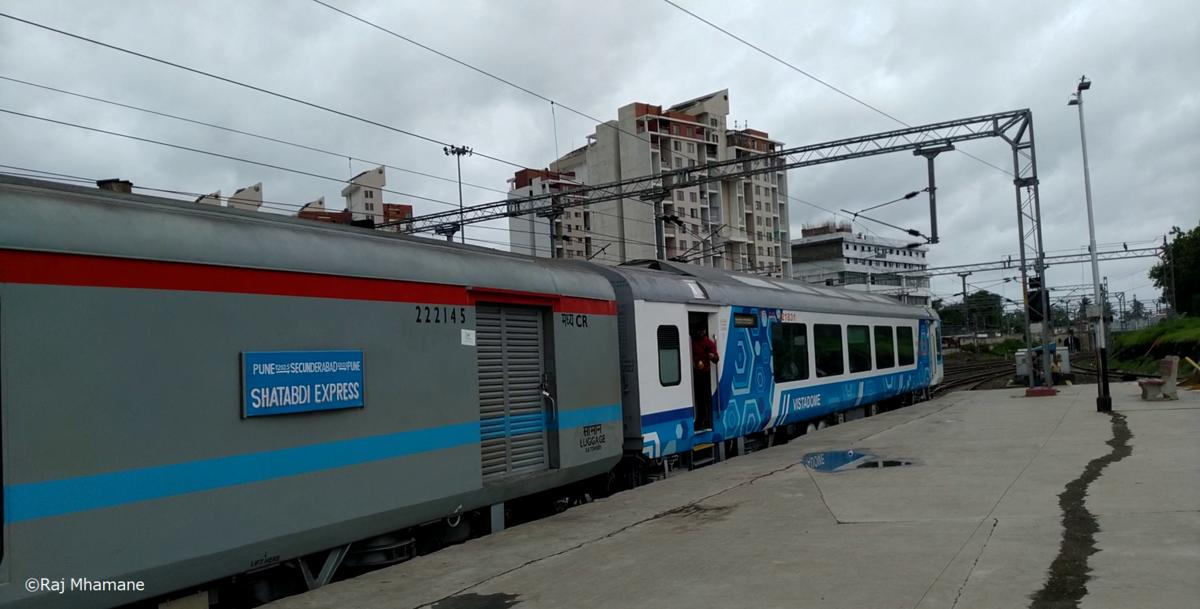
Pune-Secunderabad Shatabdi Express at Hi-tech city

== See also ==
- Shatabdi Express
