= Jaipur–Agra Fort Shatabdi Express =

Indian train

Jaipur Agra Fort Shatabdi Express (Train Cancelled / No Longer In Service)
Overview
- Service type: Superfast Express, Shatabdi Express
- First service: 28 November 2012
- Last service: 30 April 2018
- Current operator: North Western Railways

Route
- Termini: Jaipur Junction; Agra Fort
- Stops: 2
- Distance travelled: 241 km (150 mi)
- Average journey time: 03 hours 30 minutes as 12035 Jaipur Agra Fort Shatabdi Express, 04 hours 20 minutes as 12036 Agra Fort Jaipur Shatabdi Express
- Service frequency: 6 days a week except Thursday
- Train number: 12035 / 12036

On-board services
- Classes: AC 1st Class, AC Chair Car
- Seating arrangements: Yes
- Sleeping arrangements: No
- Catering facilities: No Pantry Car Coach attached but available
- Entertainment facilities: Yes pre loaded movies

Technical
- Rolling stock: Standard Indian Railways Shatabdi coaches
- Track gauge: 1,676 mm (5 ft 6 in)
- Operating speed: 105 km/h (65 mph) maximum,65 km/h (40 mph), including halts

The 12035 / 36 Jaipur Agra Fort Shatabdi Express was a Superfast Express train of the Shatabdi Express category belonging to Indian Railways - North Western Railway zone that ran between Jaipur and Agra in India. The train services were terminated from May 1, 2018, and it is no longer in service from Jaipur to Agra. But a new train was introduced from Ajmer to Agra Fort as SF Express. This train has been launched instead of Jp-Af Shatabdi Express.

It operated as train number 12035 from Jaipur Junction to Agra Fort and as train number 12036 in the reverse direction serving the states of Rajasthan & Uttar Pradesh.

== Coaches ==
The 12035 / 36 Jaipur Agra Fort Shatabdi Express presently has one AC First Class, seven AC Chair Car and two End on Generator coaches at the starting day but after that it has one A.C. First Class (Executive Chair Car) and four A.C. Chair Car. It does not carry a Pantry car coach but being a Shatabdi category train, catering is arranged on board the train.

As is customary with most train services in India, Coach Composition may be amended at the discretion of Indian Railways depending on demand.

== Service ==
The 12035 Jaipur Agra Fort Shatabdi Express covers the distance of 241 kilometres in 03 hours 30 mins (68.86 km/h) and in 04 hours 20 mins as 12036 Agra Fort Jaipur Shatabdi Express (55.62 km/h).

As the average speed of the train is above 55 km/h (34 mph), as per Indian Railway rules, its fare includes a Superfast surcharge.

== Routeing ==
The 12035 / 36 Jaipur Agra Fort Shatabdi Express runs from Jaipur Junction via Gandhinagar Jaipur, Bharatpur Junction to Agra Fort.

Being a Shatabdi class train, it returns to its originating station Jaipur Junction at the end of the day.

== Loco link ==
As the route is yet to be electrified, a Bhagat Ki Kothi based WDP 4 powers the train for its entire journey. After that due to small in size the engine is replaced with WDM 3A of ABR railway station.

== Timings ==
12035 Jaipur Agra Fort Shatabdi Express leaves Jaipur Junction every day except Thursday at 07:05 hrs IST and reaches Agra Fort at 10:35 hrs IST the same day.

12036 Agra Fort Jaipur Shatabdi Express leaves Agra Fort every day except Thursday at 18:00 hrs IST and reaches Jaipur Junction at 22:20 hrs IST the same day.
