= New Delhi–Amritsar Shatabdi Express =

Shatabdi Express train in India

New Delhi – Amritsar Junction Shatabdi Express
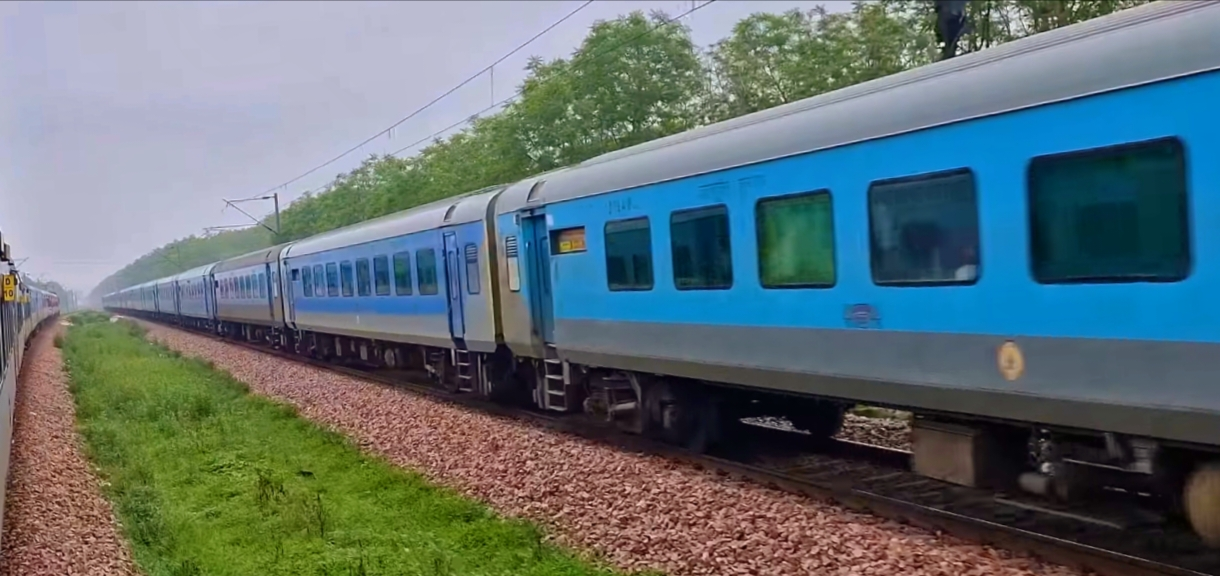
- New Delhi-Amritsar Shatabdi Express At Panipat Junction railway station

Overview
- Service type: Superfast Express, Shatabdi Express
- Current operator: Northern Railways

Route
- Termini: New Delhi; Amritsar Junction
- Stops: 6
- Distance travelled: 448 km (278 mi)
- Average journey time: 6 hours 15 minutes as 12031 New Delhi–Amritsar Shatabdi Express, 6 hours 10 minutes as 12032 Amritsar–New Delhi Shatabdi Express
- Service frequency: 1 day a week on Thursday.
- Train number: 12031 / 12032

On-board services
- Classes: Anubhuti Class, Executive Class, AC Chair Car
- Seating arrangements: Yes
- Sleeping arrangements: No
- Catering facilities: Yes pantry car attached and tea, breakfast provided.
- Baggage facilities: Overhead racks

Technical
- Rolling stock: Standard Indian Railways coaches Shatabdi Coaches
- Track gauge: 1,676 mm (5 ft 6 in)
- Operating speed: 110 km/h (68 mph) maximum, 72.16 km/h (45 mph), including halts

The 12031 / 32 New Delhi–Amritsar Shatabdi Express is a Superfast Express train of the Shatabdi category belonging to Indian Railways – Northern Railway zone that runs between New Delhi and Amritsar in India.

It operates as train number 12031 from New Delhi to Amritsar Junction and as train number 12032 in the reverse direction, serving the states of Delhi, Haryana and Punjab.

== Coaches ==
The 12031 / 32 New Delhi–Amritsar Shatabdi Express has 1 Anubhuti Class, 1 Executive Class, 14 AC Chair Car & 2 End-on Generator coaches. It does not carry a pantry car but being a Shatabdi-category train, catering is arranged on board the train.

As is customary with most train services in India, coach composition may be amended at the discretion of Indian Railways depending on demand.

The coaches in Light blue color indicate AC Chair Cars and the coaches in Violet color indicate Executive and Anubhuti Classes.

	1	2	3	4	5	6	7	8	9	10	11	12	13	14	15	16	17	18	19
12031		EOG	C1	C2	C3	C4	C5	C6	C7	C8	C9	C10	C11	C12	C13	C14	E1	K1	EOG
12032		EOG	K1	E1	C14	C13	C12	C11	C10	C9	C8	C7	C6	C5	C4	C3	C2	C1	EOG

== Service ==
The 12031 New Delhi–Amritsar Shatabdi Express covers the distance of 448 kilometres in 6 hours 15 mins (71.68 km/h) and in 6 hours 10 mins as 12032 Amritsar–New Delhi Shatabdi Express (72.65 km/h).

As the average speed of the train is above 55 km/h (34 mph), as per Indian Railways rules, its fare includes a Superfast surcharge.

== Routeing ==
The 12031 / 32 New Delhi–Amritsar Shatabdi Express runs from New Delhi via Ambala Cantonment, Ludhiana Junction, Jalandhar City to Amritsar Junction.

== Traction ==
As the entire route is fully electrified, a Ghaziabad-based WAP-5 or WAP-7 powers the train for its entire journey.

== Timings ==
NDLS - ASR - NDLS Shatabdi Express
12013		Stations	12014	
Arrival	Departure	Stations	Arrival	Departure
-NIL-	07:20	New Delhi	22:50	-NIL-
09:41	09:43	Ambala Cantt. Junction	20:26	20:30
10:02	10:04	Rajpura Junction	19:52	19:54
11:08	11:11	Ludhiana Junction	18:50	18:55
11:40	11:42	Phagwara Junction	18:14	18:16
12:06	12:08	Jalandhar City Junction	17:53	17:56
12:38	12:40	Beas Junction	17:18	17:20
13:30	-NIL-	Amritsar Junction	-NIL-	16:50
