= Rail Coach Factory, Kapurthala =

Coach manufacturing unit of the Indian Railways

Coordinates: 31.32827°N 75.35108°E

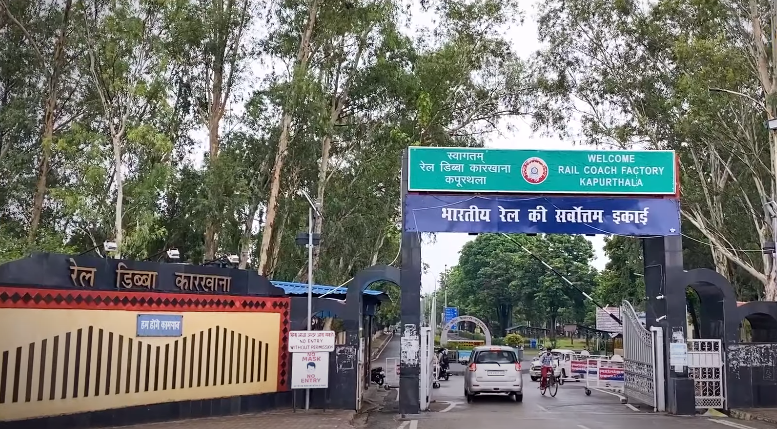
- RCF
- Type: Indian Railways coach production unit
- Industry: Rail transport
- Founded: 17 August 1986; 39 years ago
- Headquarters: Kapurthala, Punjab, India - 144602
- Area served: India
- Key people: Shri Ajay Nandan (General Manager)
- Products: Rolling stock
- Production output: 1862 coaches (2021-2022): LHB: 1840; MEMU: 22
- Total assets: ₹2,097 crore (US$220 million) (2022)
- Owner: Indian Railways
- Number of employees: 6624 (2022)
- Website: rcf.indianrailways.gov.in

The Rail Coach Factory at Kapurthala is a coach manufacturing unit of the Indian Railways in the Indian state of Punjab. It was set up in the year 1985 with an investment of ₹423 crore (US$342 million) in order to enhance production capacity for India's railways and generate employment for the youth of the state. The unit is located on the Jalandhar-Firozpur railway line, and currently, has the job of manufacturing new LHB and MEMU coaches.

== History ==
The foundation stone for Rail Coach Factory was laid by then Prime Minister of India Rajiv Gandhi on 17 August 1985 with an initial cost of ₹423 crore (US$44 million). The objective of this project was to enhance production capacity for the Railways and generate employment for the youth of Punjab. The unit commenced production just 2 years later on 19 September 1987, and rolled out its first coach a few months later on 31 March 1988.

As of March 2022, it has manufactured more than 41,000 coaches of over 60 different types, which make up over 50% of the total production of coaches on Indian Railways. Some of these are:

- 'Tejas' high-speed coach (produced only by RCF Kapurthala)
- Non-AC general coach (BG/MG)
- Non-AC luggage-cum-brake van (BG/MG)
- Refrigerated parcel van (BG)
- Accident relief train (BG)

== Production ==
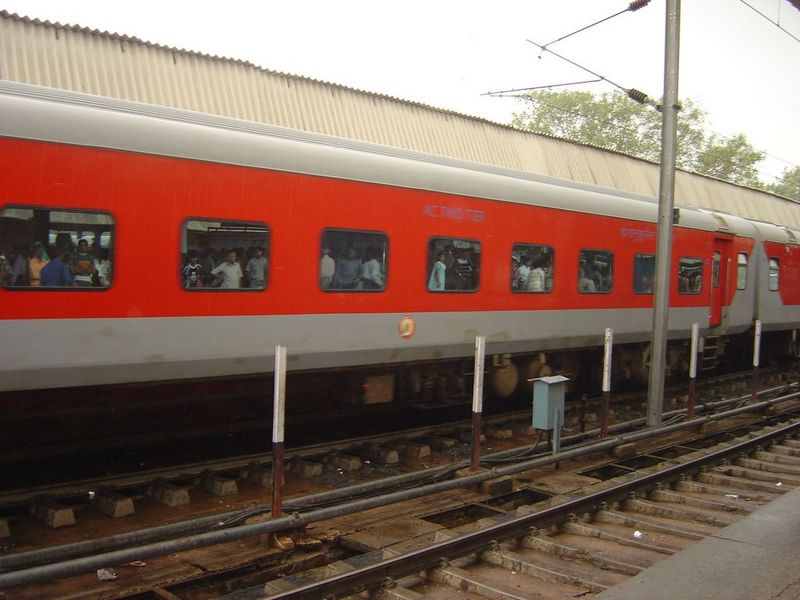
Air-conditioned LHB Coach of the Mumbai Central-New Delhi Rajdhani

During FY 2021-22, Rail Coach Factory produced 1862 coaches, which was its highest ever. Out of these, 1840 were stainless steel LHB coaches, while the remaining 22 were 3-phase MEMU coaches. During this year, the unit also crossed the 40,000 mark in cumulative coach production. Up until March 2022, RCF has produced 41,014 coaches of more than 60 design variants, both AC and non-AC. This comprises more than 50% of the total stock of coaches running on Indian Railways. The factory, in association with DRDE, has also developed a highly cost-effective indigenous technology for the treatment of biowaste in coaches.

During FY 2015-16, the factory manufactured 120 LHB coaches to be exported to Bangladesh at an estimated cost of ₹367 crore (US$38 million), with the first consignment of 40 sets dispatched in March 2016. Before this (in 2006), the factory had already exported metre gauge coaches to Myanmar and Senegal.

== See also ==
- Diesel Locomotive Factory, Marhowrah
- Electric Locomotive Factory, Madhepura
- Chittaranjan Locomotive Works, Asansol
- Banaras Locomotive Works, Varanasi
- Integral Coach Factory, Chennai
- Modern Coach Factory, Raebareli
- Rail Wheel Plant, Bela
- Rail Wheel Factory, Yelahanka
- Titagarh Wagons, Titagarh
- List of locomotive builders by countries
