= Shatabdi Express =

Series of Express day train in India

Shatabdi Express transl. Centenary Express
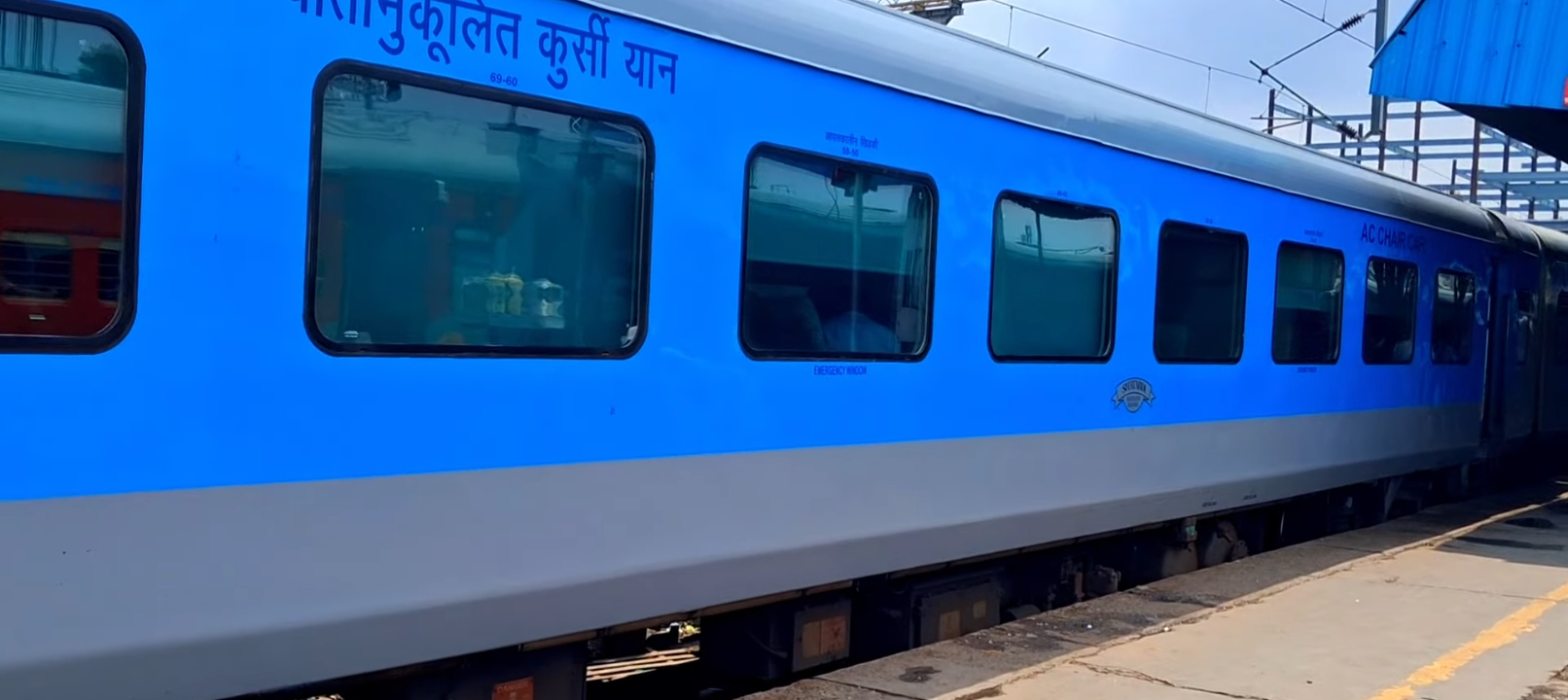
- Shatabdi Express Arrived At Ambala cantt junction

Overview
- Service type: Superfast
- Status: Active
- First service: 10-July-1988; 38 years ago
- Successor: Vande Bharat Express
- Current operator: Indian Railways
- Website: http://indianrail.gov.in

On-board services
- Classes: Executive Chair Car, AC Chair Car, Anubhuti and Vistadome
- Seating arrangements: Yes
- Catering facilities: On-board Catering
- Baggage facilities: Overhead Racks, Baggage Area Near Vestibule

Technical
- Rolling stock: LHB coach
- Track gauge: 5 ft 6 in (1,676 mm) broad gauge
- Operating speed: 130 km/h (81 mph) (maximum) where infrastructure is available
- Track owner: Indian Railways

Shatabdi Express (transl. Centenary Express) are a series of fast passenger trains operated by the Indian Railways. These are day trains and mostly return to their origin station the same day. The trains run at a maximum permissible speed of 110–130 km/h (68–81 mph) depending on the infrastructure on the corresponding route.

== History ==
The name "Shatabdi" means century in Sanskrit and the first Shatabdi Express train was announced on 10-July-1988 by then railways minister Madhavrao Scindia to commemorate the birth centenary of Jawaharlal Nehru, the first Indian prime minister and plied between New Delhi and Gwalior. The first Shatabdi, at that time the fastest train of the country, ran at a maximum speed of 140 km/h (87 mph). The maximum speed was increased to 150 km/h (93 mph) between Tughlakabad and Agra Cantonment on 15-February-2006, and it was the fastest train in India till the introduction of the Gatiman Express in 2016 and was reverted to 130 km/h from 24-June-2024 citing KAVACH Works and Track Upgrades and Accidents Relating to Kaziranga Derailments.

== Facilities ==
Shatabdi Express trains offer fast connectivity between major cities with only a few intermediate stops and can run at a maximum speed of 150 km/h (93 mph). Passengers are provided with on-board catering. Onboard entertainment systems are available in select trains providing content via satellite. Seats in Shatabdi Express have to be reserved in advance as there is no unreserved accommodation, unlike most of the other trains in India. Reservation is allowed until up to 30 minutes before the scheduled departure time and the seats are auto allocated by the reservation system. Dynamic pricing is applicable on the fares.

== Rolling stock ==
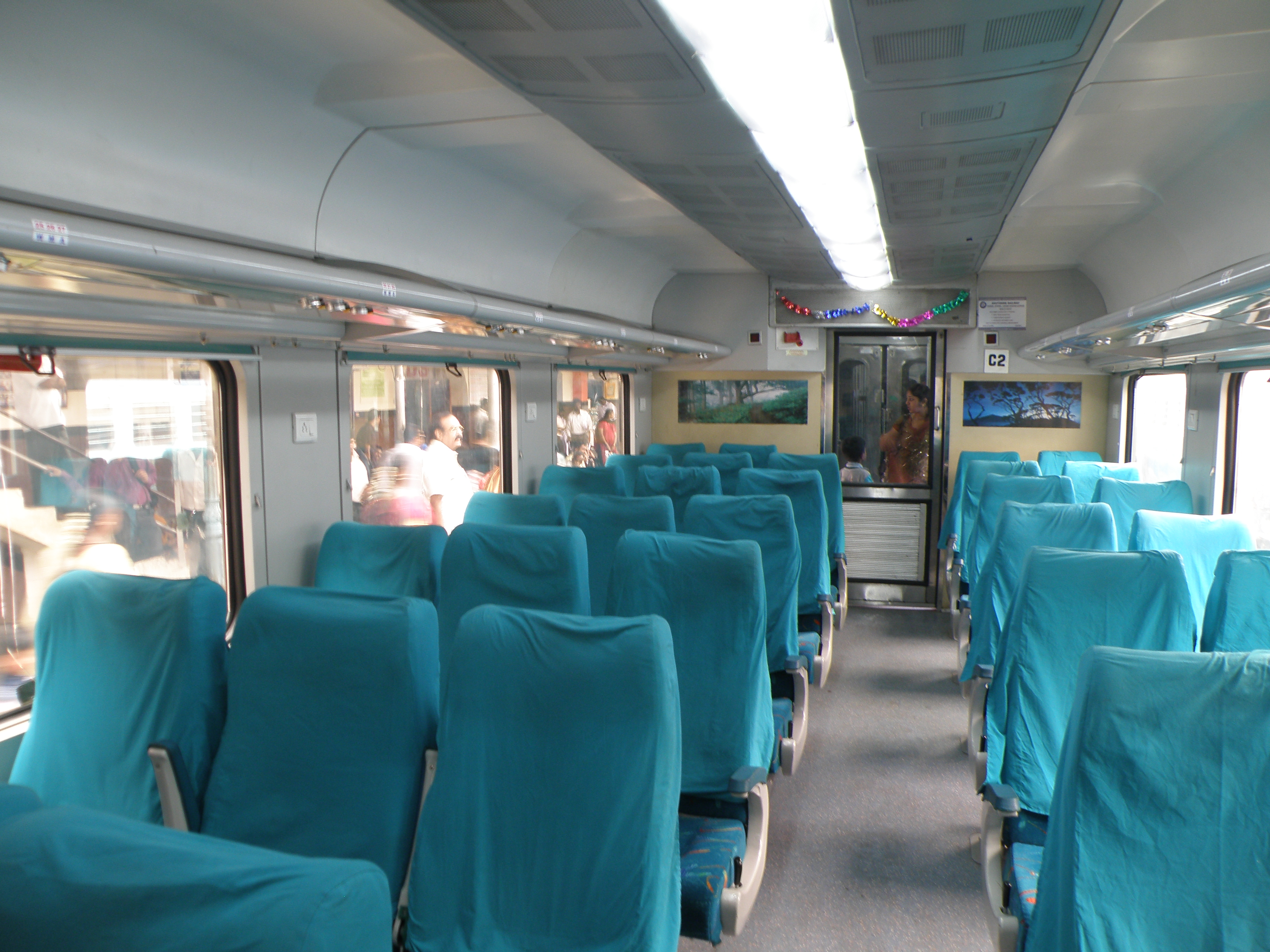
Interior of an AC chair car coach

As Shatabdi Express are day-trains and return to the station of origin the same day, coaches have only seats and not berths. They are fully air-conditioned and the trains have multiple AC Chair Car coaches and most of them have one or two coaches of Executive Class seating. Indian Railways offers Anubhuti class seating and Vistadome coaches offering large windows, transparent roofing, and rotatable seats in select trains. The trains used to operate on specialized coaches manufactured by Integral Coach Factory, Chennai with the older coaches now been replaced with newer LHB rakes on all the trains. The trains are hauled by various diesel or electric locomotives diesel locomotives like WDP-4, WDG-4, WDM-3A, WDM-3D and a new specialized high speed locomotive class WAP-7HS and WAP-5 with a maximum speed of 180 km/h (110 mph) for hauling Shatabdi express trains was introduced in 2019.

== Services ==
=== Active ===
As of April 2025, there are 22 operational pairs of Shatabdi express trains. (consists of 21 standard Shatabdi Express and 1 Gatimaan Express).

List of active services
Sr. no.	Route	Train no.	Originating Station	Terminal Station	Operator	Distance	Duration	Avg Speed (Km/h)	Year introduced	Stops
1	Rani Kamalapati – New Delhi	12001/12002	Rani Kamalapati	New Delhi	NR	709 km (441 mi)	8h 40m	82 km/h (51 mph)	1988	Bhopal Jn., Bina Jn., Lalitpur Jn., Jhansi Jn., Gwalior Jn., Morena, Dholpur Jn., Agra Cantt., Mathura Jn.
2	Lucknow–New Delhi	12003/12004	Lucknow Jn.	New Delhi	NR	512 km (318 mi)	6h 50m	75 km/h (47 mph)	1989	Kanpur Central, Phaphund, Etawah Jn., Tundla Jn., Aligarh Jn., Ghaziabad Jn.
3	New Delhi–Kalka	12005/12006	New Delhi	Kalka	NR	269 km (167 mi)	4h 0m	67 km/h (42 mph)	1989	Panipat Jn., Kurukshetra Jn., Ambala Cantt. Jn., Chandigarh Jn.
4	MGR Chennai Central–Mysuru	12007/12008	MGR Chennai Central	Mysuru Jn.	SR	497 km (309 mi)	7h 7m	69.5 km/h (43.2 mph)	1994	Katpadi Jn., KSR Bengaluru
5	Mumbai Central–Ahmedabad	12009/12010	Mumbai Central	Ahmedabad Jn.	WR	493 km (306 mi)	6h 27m	76.5 km/h (47.5 mph)	1994	Borivali, Vapi, Surat, Bharuch Jn., Vadodara Jn., Anand Jn., Nadiad Jn.
6	New Delhi–Kalka	12011/12012	New Delhi	Kalka	NR	269 km (167 mi)	4h 0m	66.5 km/h (41.3 mph)	1994	Sonipat Jn., Panipat Jn., Kurukshetra Jn., Ambala Cantt. Jn., Chandigarh Jn.
7	New Delhi–Amritsar	12013/12014	New Delhi	Amritsar Jn.	NR	448 km (278 mi)	6h 21m	70.5 km/h (43.8 mph)	1994	Ambala Cantt. Jn., Sirhind, Ludhiana, Phagwara, Jalandhar City Jn., Beas Jn.
8	New Delhi–Daurai	12015/12016	New Delhi	Daurai	NR	444 km (276 mi)	7h 20m	61.5 km/h (38.2 mph)	1994	Delhi Cantt., Gurgaon, Rewari Jn., Alwar Jn., Bandikui Jn., Gandhinagar, Jaipur Jn., Kishangarh
9	New Delhi–Dehradun	12017/12018	New Delhi	Dehradun	NR	314 km (195 mi)	6h 3m	52 km/h (32 mph)	1995	Ghaziabad Jn., Meerut City Jn., Muzaffarnagar, Saharanpur Jn., Roorkee, Haridwar
10	Howrah–Ranchi	12019/12020	Howrah Jn.	Ranchi Jn.	ER	423 km (263 mi)	7h 22m	57 km/h (35 mph)	1995	Durgapur, Raniganj, Asansol, Dhanbad, Chandrapura, Bokaro Steel City, Muri
11	Pune–Secunderabad	12025/12026	Pune Jn.	Secunderabad Jn.	CR	597 km (371 mi)	8h 22m	71 km/h (44 mph)	2011	Solapur, Kalaburagi Junction, Wadi Jn., Tandur, Vikarabad Jn., Begumpet
12	KSR Bengaluru - MGR Chennai Central	12027/12028	MGR Chennai Central	KSR Bengaluru	SWR	359 km (223 mi)	4h 57m	72.5 km/h (45.0 mph)	2005	Katpadi Jn., Jolarpettai Jn., Bengaluru Cantt.
13	New Delhi–Amritsar	12029/12030	New Delhi	Amritsar Jn.	NR	448 km (278 mi)	6h 5m	74 km/h (46 mph)	1998	Ambala Cantt. Jn., Rajpura Jn., Ludhiana, Phagwara, Jalandhar City Jn., Beas Jn.
14	New Delhi–Amritsar	12031/12032	New Delhi	Amritsar Jn.	NR	448 km (278 mi)	6h 5m	74 km/h (46 mph)	1997	Ambala Cantt. Jn., Rajpura Jn., Ludhiana, Phagwara, Jalandhar City Jn., Beas Jn.
15	Kanpur Central–New Delhi	12033/12034	Kanpur Central	New Delhi	NCR	440 km (270 mi)	5h 15m	84 km/h (52 mph)	2010	Etawah, Aligarh, Ghaziabad Jn.
16	Kathgodam–New Delhi	12039/12040	Kathgodam	New Delhi	NR	282 km (175 mi)	5h 42m	49.5 km/h (30.8 mph)	2012	Haldwani, Lalkuan Jn., Rudrapur, Rampur, Moradabad, Ghaziabad Jn.
17	Howrah–New Jalpaiguri	12041/12042	Howrah Jn.	New Jalpaiguri Jn.	NFR	566 km (352 mi)	8h 20m	68 km/h (42 mph)	2012	Bardhaman Jn., Bolpur Shantiniketan, New Farakka Jn., Malda Town, Kishanganj
18	New Delhi–Chandigarh	12045/12046	New Delhi	Chandigarh Jn.	NR	244 km (152 mi)	3h 20m	74 km/h (46 mph)	2013	Ambala Cantt. Jn., Karnal
19	Hazrat Nizamuddin–Virangana Lakshmibai Jhansi Junction	12049/12050	Nizamuddin	Jhansi	NR	403 km (250 mi)	4h 25m	94.82 km/h (58.92 mph)	2016	Hazrat Nizamuddin., Agra Cantonment
20	Naharlagun–Guwahati	12087/12088	Naharlagun	Guwahati	NFR	332 km (206 mi)	5h 47m	57.5 km/h (35.7 mph)	2017	Harmuti Jn., Viswanath Charali, Rangapara North Jn., Udalguri, Rangiya Jn. etc..
21	MGR Chennai Central–Coimbatore	12243/12244	MGR Chennai Central	Coimbatore Jn.	SR	493 km (306 mi)	6h 52m	72 km/h (45 mph)	2013	Katpadi Jn., Jolarpettai Jn., Salem Jn., Erode Jn., Tiruppur
22	Howrah – Puri	12277/12278	Howrah Jn.	Puri	ECoR	500 km (310 mi)	7h 50m	63.5 km/h (39.5 mph)	2013	Kharagpur Jn., Balasore, Bhadrak, Jajpur Keonjhar Road, Cuttack, Bhubaneswar

=== Defunct ===
List of defunct services
Route #	Train no.	Originating Station	Terminal Station	Year of Introduction	Year of Termination	Reference
Bangalore City – Hubli Jn.	2025/2026	Bangalore City	Hubli Jn.	1995	1996	
Chennai Central – Coimbatore Jn.	2023/2024	Chennai Central	Coimbatore Jn.	1995	2000	
Rajahmundry – Secunderabad Jn.		Rajahmundry	Secunderabad Jn.	1999	2000	
New Delhi - Patiala – Bathinda #		New Delhi	Bathinda		2003	
New Delhi – Bareilly		New Delhi	Bareilly		2003	
Howrah – Rourkela (Later short terminated at Tatanagar)	2021/2022	Howrah	Rourkela (Later short terminated at Tatanagar)	1995	2003	
Howrah – Patna	2023/2024	Howrah	Patna Jn.	2001	2003	
Mumbai – Pune	2027/2028	Mumbai CSMT	Pune Jn.	1995	2004	
Jaipur – Agra Fort	12035/12036	Jaipur	Agra Fort	2012	2018	
New Delhi – Rhotak - Ludhiana #	12037/12038	New Delhi	Ludhiana Jn.	2011	2019	
New Delhi – Rhotak - Moga #	12043/12044	New Delhi	Moga	2012	2019	
New Delhi – Firozpur, up to Bathinda during introduction	12047/12048	New Delhi	Firozpur Cantt.	2014	2021	
Guwahati – Dibrugarh	12085/12086	Guwahati	Dibrugarh	2017	2020	

# Name of an intermediate station may be written if the route is not the shortest or to distinguish between more than one Shatabdi route irrespective of present and past routes.

== Trivia ==
- For many years, the Bhopal Shatabdi Express (now Rani Kamalapati - New Delhi Shatabdi Express) held the record for the fastest train in India having Commercial Speed of 91 km/h(reaching speeds of up to 150 km/h on certain stretches), particularly between Tughlakabad and Agra.
- Unlike most long-distance Indian trains, Shatabdi Express trains are designed exclusively for day travel. This means they only have seating arrangements (Chair Car and Executive Chair Car) and no sleeping berths.
- The MGR Chennai Central–Mysuru Shatabdi Express (launched in 1994) holds the distinction of being the first Shatabdi Express to operate in South India.
- Gatiman Express is also such type of a train but faster than Shatabdi Train where infrastructure is available that had a difference of yellow stripes in all its coaches, and has fare slightly higher than that of Shatabdi Express.
- Howrah–Digha Super AC Express, completely a Shatabdi Express type train having other name instead of "Shatabdi Express" after conversion from a Duronto Express of year 2010 to 2015 was suspended during COVID-19 pandemic in 2020 and was withdrawn later without making any journey since that suspension period.

== See also ==
- Howrah–Digha Super AC Express
- Rajdhani Express
- Duronto Express
- Tejas Express
- Gatimaan Express
- Humsafar Express
- Jan Shatabdi Express
- Vande Bharat Express
- Amrit Bharat Express
