= Karnal railway station =

Railway station in Haryana, India

Karnal
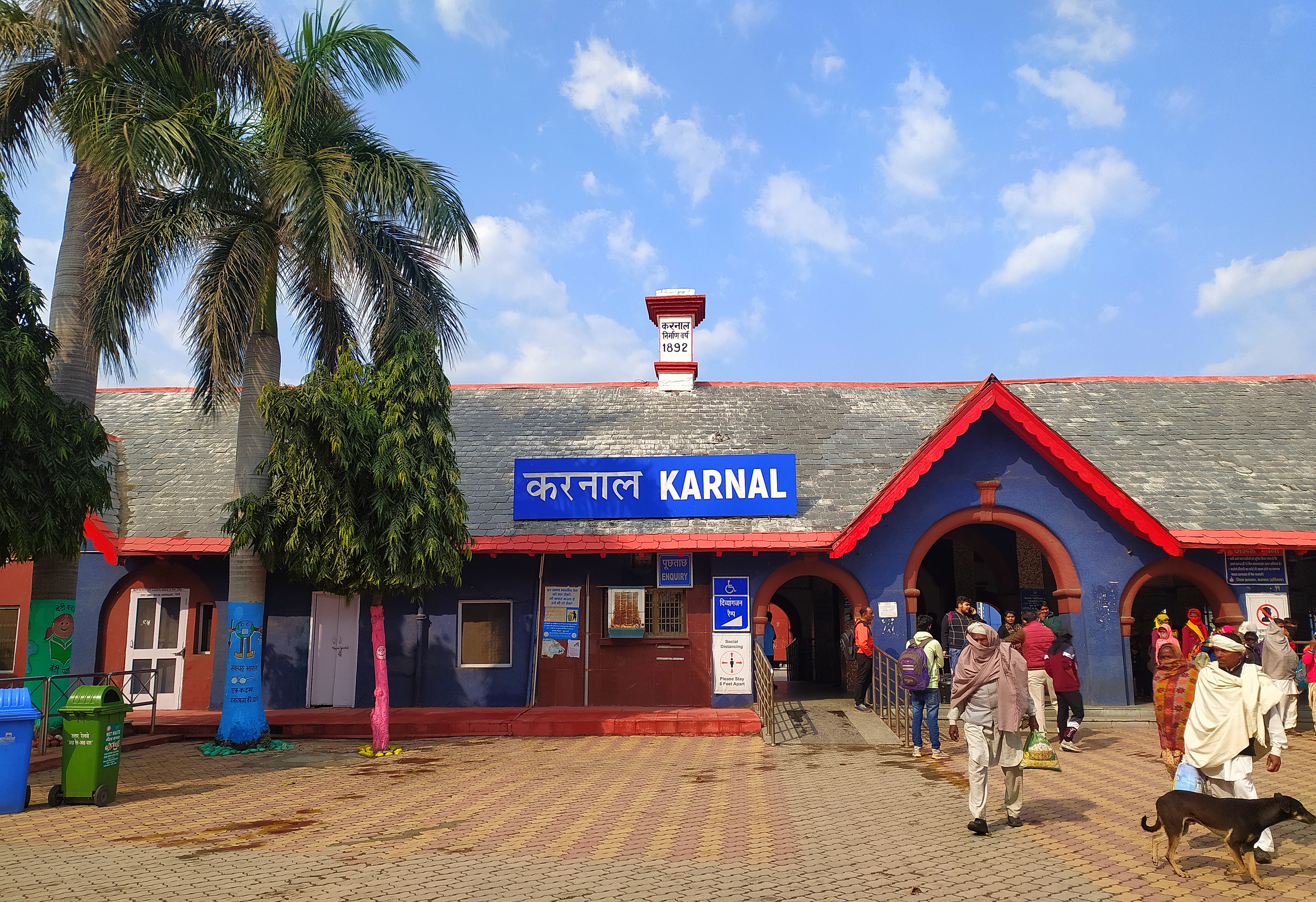
- Karnal Railway Station Main Entrance

General information
- Location: Haryana State Highway 9 (SH-9), Karnal, Haryana; India
- Coordinates: 29.6947°N 76.9695°E
- Elevation: 251 metres (823 ft)
- System: Indian Railway Station
- Owner: Ministry of Railways (India)
- Operator: Indian Railways
- Line: Delhi–Kalka line
- Platforms: 3
- Tracks: 4

Construction
- Structure type: At grade
- Parking: Available
- Accessible: Available

Other information
- Status: Functioning
- Station code: KUN
- Zone(s): Northern Railway
- Division(s): Delhi

History
- Opened: 16 October 1892; 133 years ago
Location
- Location within Haryana

Karnal railway station (station code: KUN), at an altitude of 253 metres (830 ft) above mean sea level, is a NSG-3 category, class "A" station on DUK section Delhi-Kalka line, located in Karnal district of Haryana state of India. Inaugurated on 16 October 1892 in the British Raj era, It is one of the oldest heritage stations in India which also holds the title of country's National Heritage Site. It is under Delhi railway division (DLI) of Northern Railway zone (NR) of the Indian Railways (IR).

== History ==
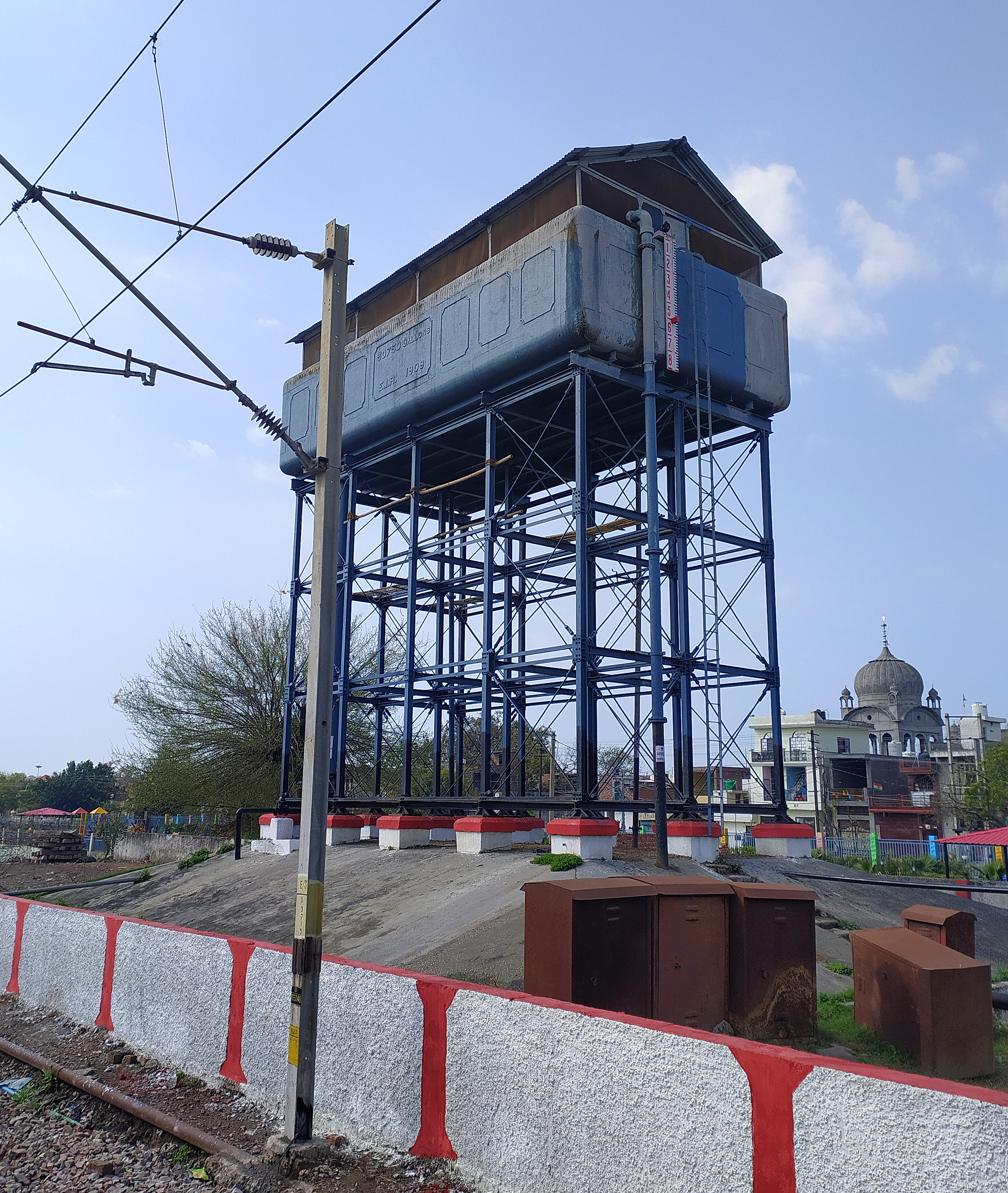
The historical water tank made by the British Raj in 1920 still remains intact at the station. This water tank was used for providing power to steam engines used at that time

In 1891, the Delhi–Panipat–Ambala–Kalka line was opened. In 1892, Karnal station was built during the British Raj. From 1800 to 1845, Karnal was a British cantonment. The vintage historical Karnal railway station is located on the DUK route.

== Future projects ==
In July 2021, the union government approved the Karnal-Yamunanagar line. After the construction of this new rail line, Karnal railway station will become a railway junction via new Greenfield Karnal–Yamuna Nagar railway line via Indri, Ladwa, Radaur, Daamla, Jagadhari Workshop railway station. The Detailed Project Report (DPR) was approved by the Haryana Government & submitted on 3 September 2019 to Indian Railway Board, Ministry of Railways of Government of India. The existing rail route from Karnal to Yamunanagar is via Ambala Cantt which is 121 Km. Whereas, proposed route will be 61 km and also connected with unserved regions like Indri, Ladwa and Radaur.

In March 2022, MP Sanjay Bhatia from Bhartiya Janta Party (BJP) raised the issue on much awaited and controversial Karnal-Yamunanagar railway line project in the parliament. Bhatia said that this project is being continuously delayed and therefore requested its completion soon to the Ministry of Indian Railways. In addition to it, Railway Minister Ashwini Vaishnaw replied that this line doesn't seem to be much useful and is financially unviable as well. However, Sanjay Bhatia still claims that this line will be constructed for sure and is not cancelled by the ministry instead it is under review and being actively modified. The demand for Karnal-Yamunanagar line by the natives has been since 1998 which makes it one of the most awaited and demanded railway line projects of its kind. Furthermore, Sanjay Bhatia also demanded the upgrade of Karnal railway station to a junction station to the Ministry.

== Rail network ==
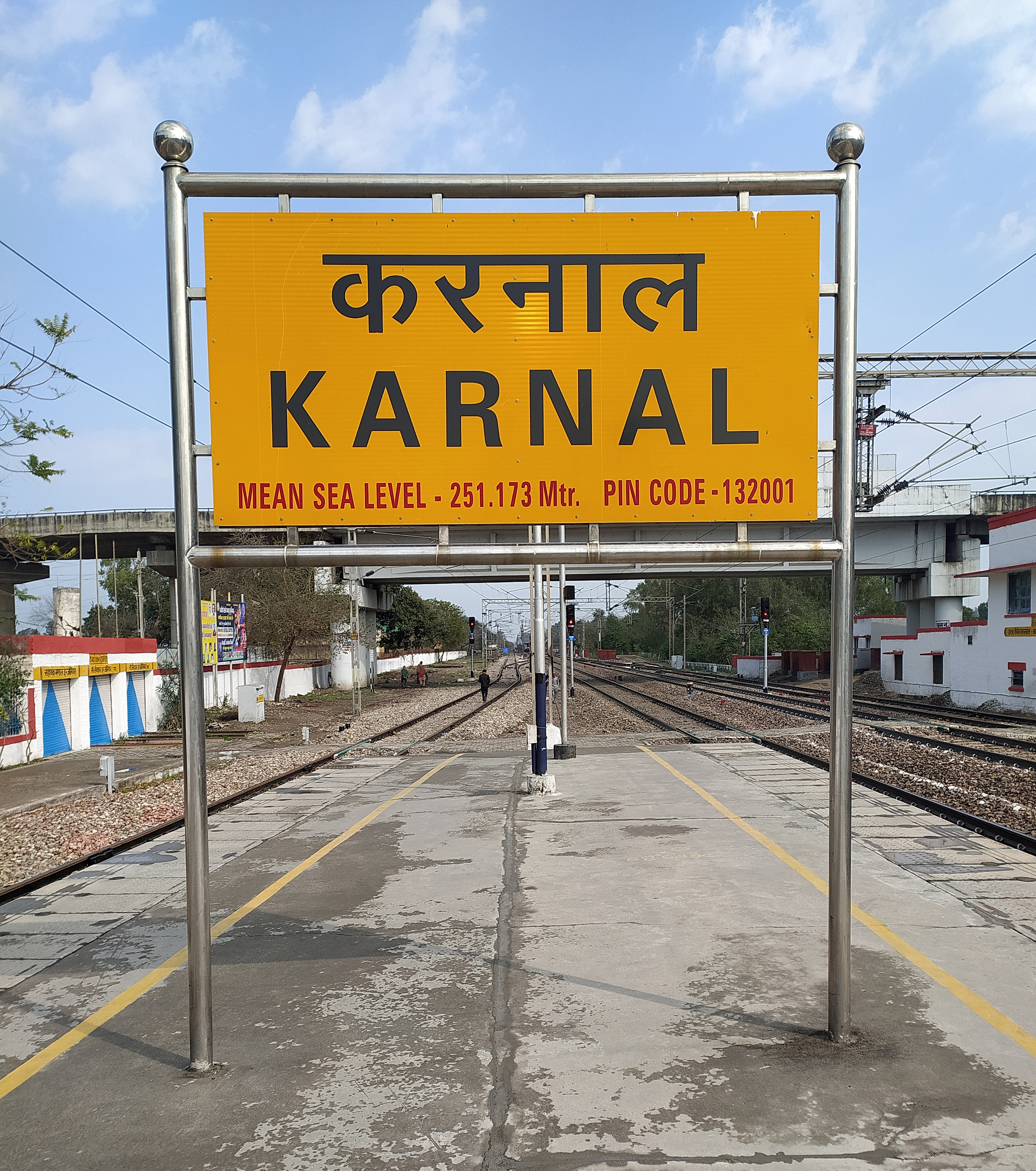

As of 2021, the station has one line and another line has been approved.

- Delhi–Panipat–Karnal–Ambala–Kalka line: It is also called DUK route. Nearby stations on this route are Bazida Jatan, Gharaunda, Kohand, Babarpur, Panipat jn towards Delhi in the south, while in north direction it has Bhaini Khurd, Taraori, Nilokheri, Amin, Kurukshetra jn towards Ambala Cantonment, Amritsar, and Chandigarh.
- Karnal-Yamunanagar line: Approved and yet to be constructed. After the construction of this new rail line, Karnal railway station will become a railway junction via Karnal, Indri, Ladwa, Radaur, Daamla, Jagadhari Workshop railway station.

== Trains at Karnal ==
As of April 2022, a total of around 105-115 trains pass through Karnal Railway Station daily from which only 50-60 trains halt here. Some of the major trains at Karnal are:

- Pooja Superfast Express
- Delhi-Pathankot Superfast Express
- Netaji Express
- Jammu Mail
- Ajmer–Chandigarh Garib Rath Express
- New Delhi–Chandigarh Shatabdi Express
- Unchahar Express
- Jhelum Express
- Malwa Express
- Paschim Superfast Express
- Ekta Express
- Gita Jayanti Express
- Himalayan Queen Express
- Una–New Delhi Jan Shatabdi Express
- Shan-e-Punjab Express
- Sachkhand Express
- Agra Cantonment-Hoshiarpur Express

== See also ==
- Railway in Haryana
- Highways in Haryana
- Haryana Tourism

Preceding station	Indian Railways	Following station
Bazida Jatan towards ?	Northern Railway zone Delhi–Kalka line	Bhaini Khurd towards ?
