= Kalka Shatabdi Express =

Shatabdi Express train in India

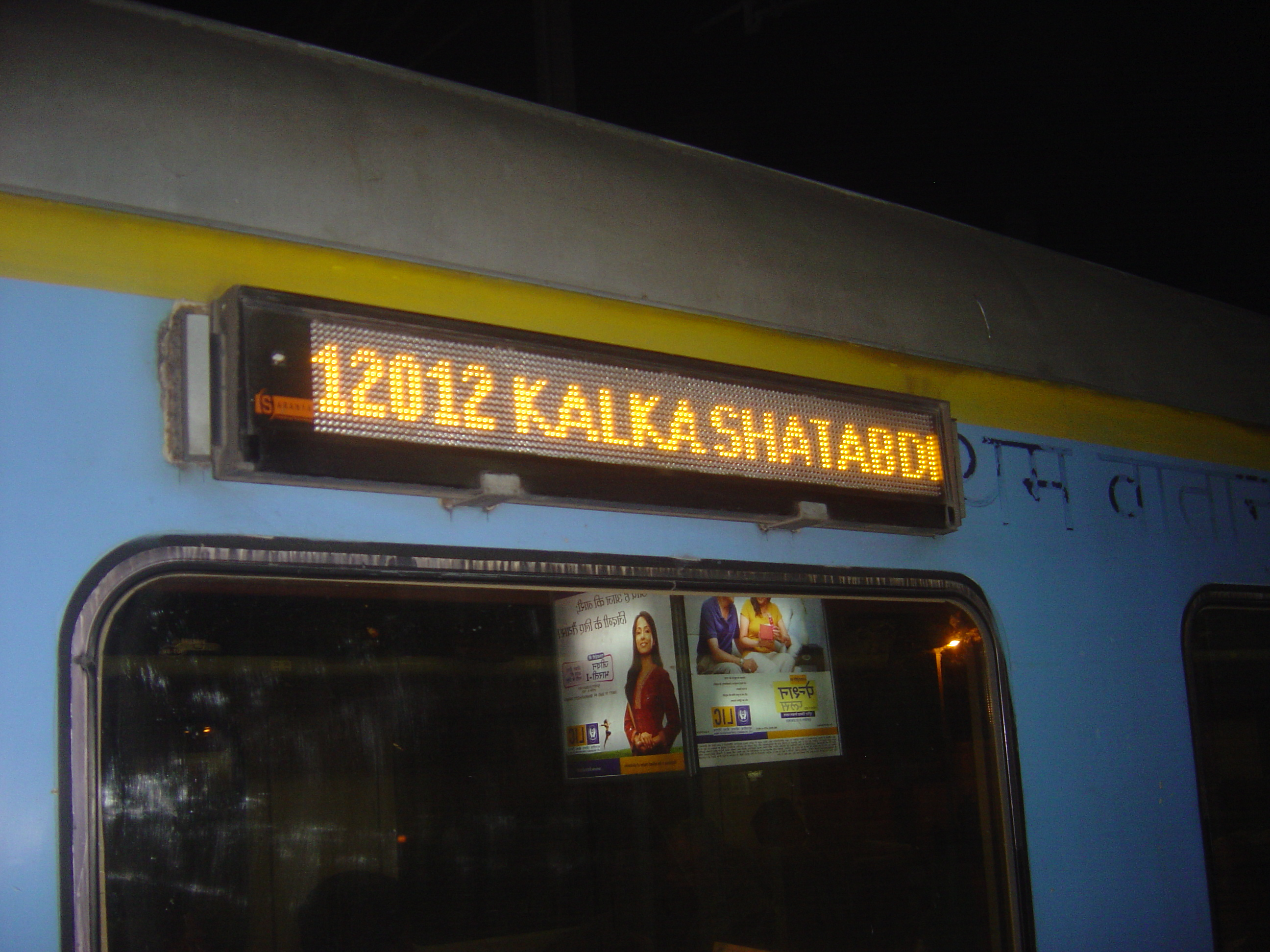

- Kalka Shatabdi Express At Panipat Junction

Overview
- Service type: Shatabdi Express
- Locale: New Delhi, Haryana, Chandigarh
- First service: 20 July 1994
- Current operator: Northern Railway

Route
- Termini: New Delhi Station; Kalka
- Stops: 5
- Distance travelled: 269 km (167 mi)
- Average journey time: 4 hours
- Service frequency: Daily
- Train number: 12011 / 12012
- Line used: New Delhi–Kalka

On-board services
- Classes: Executive Chair Car, AC Chair Car
- Seating arrangements: Yes
- Sleeping arrangements: No
- Catering facilities: Yes, no pantry car
- Observation facilities: LHB rakes
- Entertainment facilities: Large windows
- Baggage facilities: Overhead racks

Technical
- Rolling stock: LHB rakes Pulled by a WAP-7
- Track gauge: 1,676 mm (5 ft 6 in)
- Operating speed: 130 km/h (81 mph) maximum 67 km/h (42 mph), including halts

The 12011/12012 Kalka Shatabdi Express is a Superfast Express train of Shatabdi class belonging to Indian Railways that runs between New Delhi and Kalka in India. It is a daily service. It operates as train number 12011 from New Delhi railway station to Kalka railway station and as train number 12012 in the reverse direction. The train is mostly used by tourists, along with Netaji Express, en route to Shimla. Thus, gaining its international patronage.

== Service ==
It is the fastest train on the Delhi–Kalka sector. It shares this distinction with its sister train 12005/06 Kalka Shatabdi Express. It covers the distance of 269 kilometers in 4 hours as 12011 Shatabdi Express (67 km/h) and 4 hours 5 mins as 12012 Shatabdi Express (66 km/h).

== Loco link ==
It is regularly hauled by a WAP-7 locomotive with HOG capability from the Ghaziabad Shed. It receives banker engines between Chandigarh & Kalka. Generally, these are WAP-4 or WAP-5.
