= Chandi Mandir railway station =

Railway station in India

Chandi Mandir (Panchkula) Railway Station
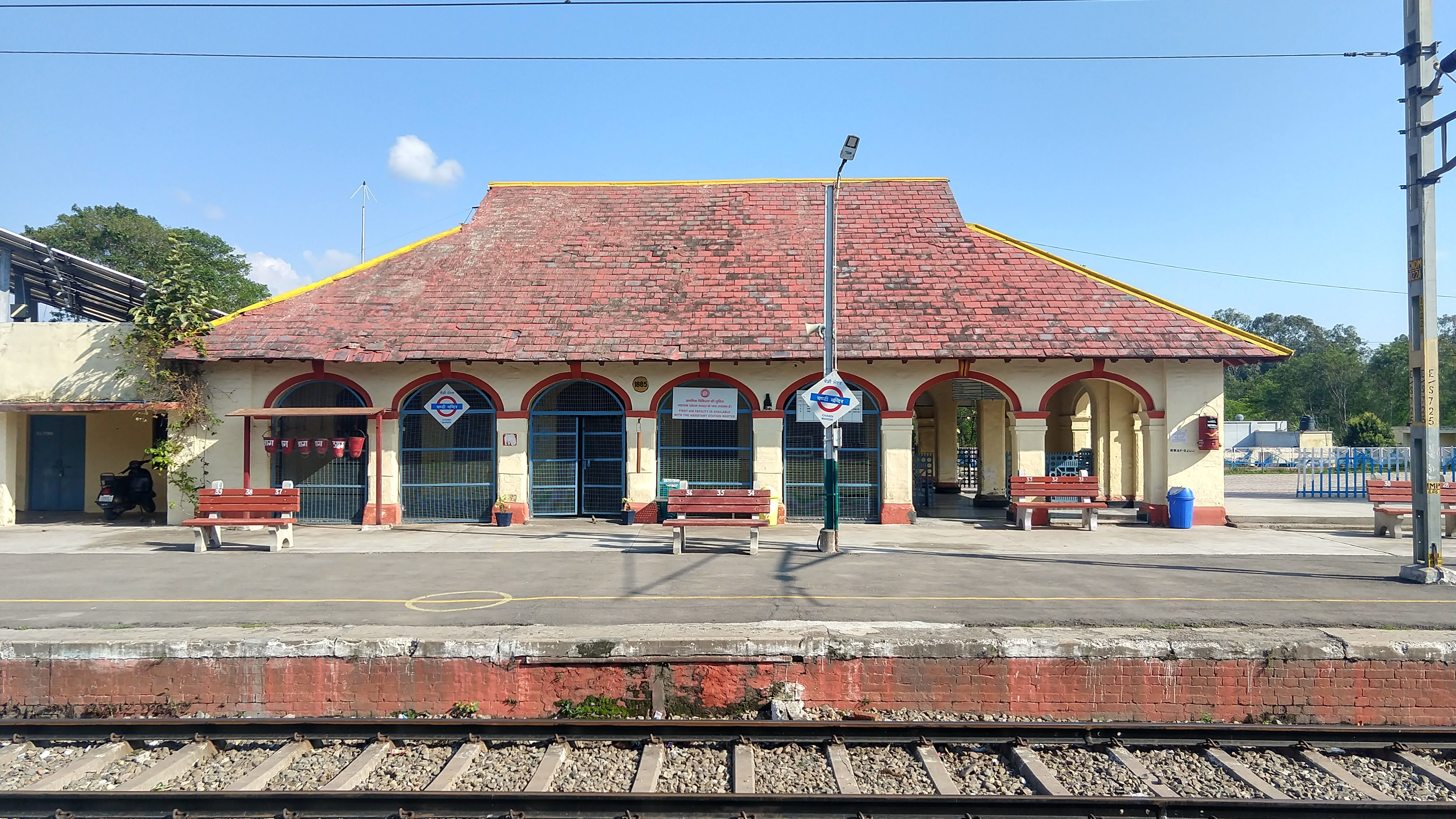

General information
- Location: Chandigarh–Kalka Road, Panchkula district, Haryana; India
- Coordinates: 30.7271°N 76.8872°E
- Elevation: 353.830 metres (1,160.86 ft)
- System: Indian Railways station
- Owner: Indian Railways
- Operator: Ambala railway division
- Platforms: 3
- Tracks: 4 (single electrified broad gauge)
- Connections: Auto stand

Construction
- Structure type: Standard (on-ground station)
- Parking: yes
- Cycle facilities: No

Other information
- Status: Functioning
- Station code: CNDM
- Fare zone: Northern Railway
Location

Chandi Mandir (Panchkula) Railway Station is a small railway station in Panchkula district, Haryana. Its code is CNDM. It serves Chandimandir Cantonment area of Panchkula city. The station consists of three platforms. The platforms are not well sheltered. It lacks many facilities including water and sanitation. Chandigarh railway station as well as Chandigarh Airport are the usual air and rail transport hubs for this Chandimandir Cantonment.

== Gallery ==
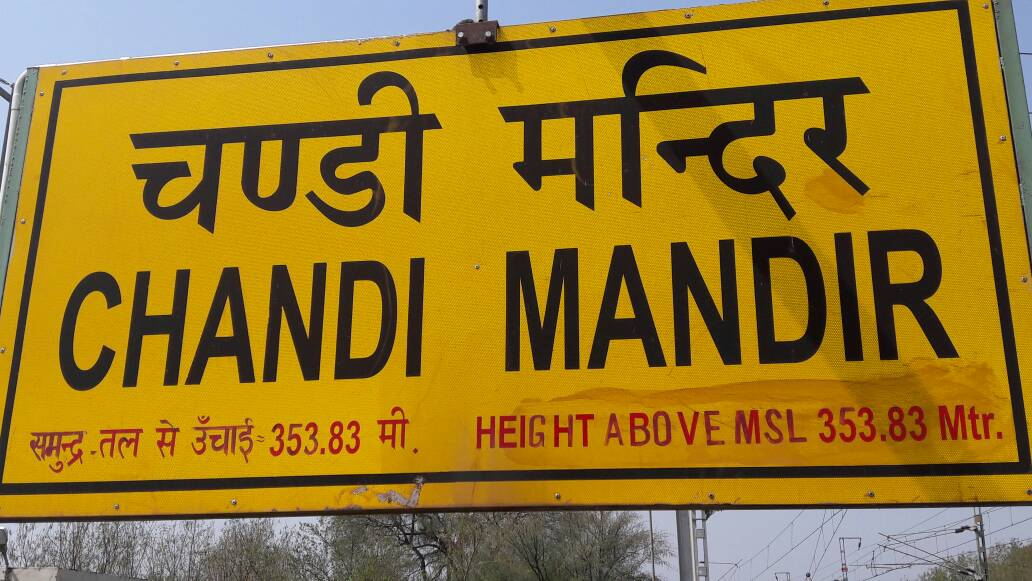
Chandi Mandir railway station – Station board

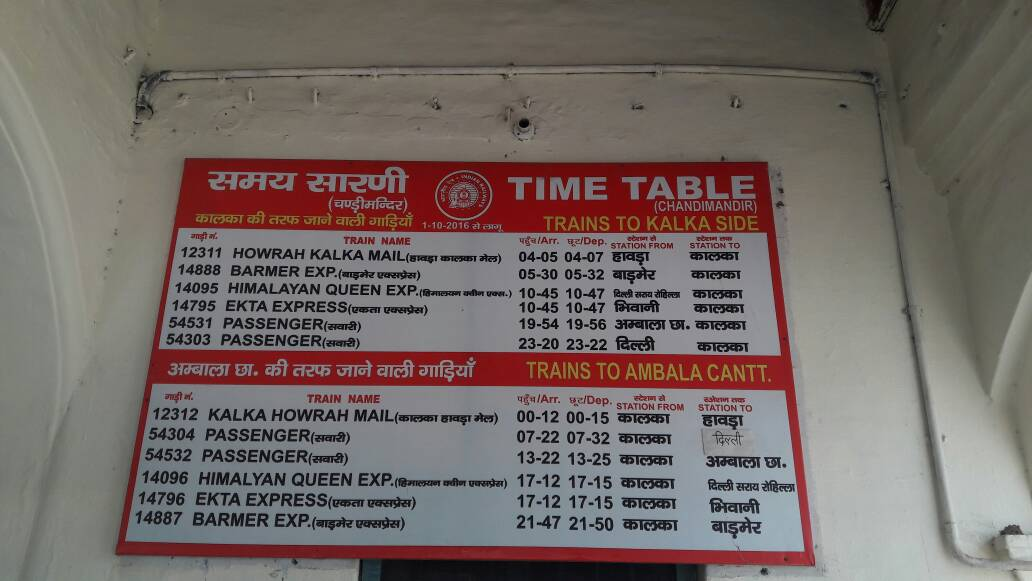
Chandi Mandir railway station – Train list

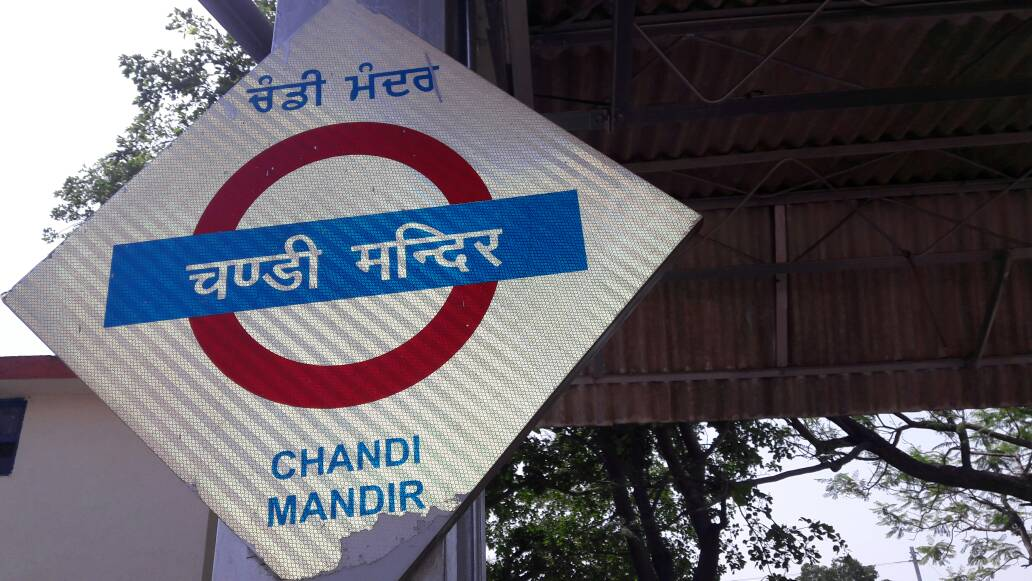
Chandi Mandir railway station – Platform board

== Major trains ==
- Kalka Mail
- Udyan Abha Toofan Express
- Kalka–Barmer Express
- Kalka–Delhi Passenger (unreserved)
- Himalayan Queen Express
- Ekta Express
- Kalka–Ambala Passenger (unreserved)
- Kalka–Shriganganagar Express
