= Himalayan Queen Express =

Overview
- Service type: Express
- First service: 3 June 1983; 42 years ago
- Current operator: Northern Railways

Route
- Termini: Delhi Sarai Rohilla (DEE); Kalka (KLK)
- Stops: 12
- Distance travelled: 305 km (190 mi)
- Average journey time: 5 hours 25 mins
- Service frequency: Daily
- Train number: 14095 / 14096

On-board services
- Classes: AC Chair Car, Second Class seating, General Unreserved
- Seating arrangements: Yes
- Sleeping arrangements: No
- Catering facilities: On-board catering, E-catering
- Observation facilities: Rake sharing with 14795 / 14796 Bhiwani–Kalka Ekta Express
- Baggage facilities: Overhead rack

Technical
- Rolling stock: ICF coach
- Track gauge: 1,676 mm (5 ft 6 in)
- Operating speed: 110 km/h (68 mph) maximum, 54.22 km/h (34 mph) average including halts.

The 14095 / 14096 Himalayan Queen Express is an Express train belonging to Indian Railways – Northern Railway zone that runs between Delhi Sarai Rohilla and Kalka in India.

It operates as train number 14095 from Delhi Sarai Rohilla to Kalka and as train number 14096 in the reverse direction serving the states of Delhi, Haryana and the Union Territory of Chandigarh.

== Coaches ==
The 14095 / 96 Delhi Sarai Rohilla–Kalka Himalayan Queen Express has 1 AC Chair Car, 7 Second Class seating, 6 General Unreserved and 2 SLR (Seating cum Luggage Rake) coaches. It does not carry a pantry car.

As is customary with most train services in India, coach composition may be amended at the discretion of Indian Railways depending on demand.

In addition, it carries 8 coaches of the 14795 / 96 Bhiwani–Kalka Ekta Express.

== Service ==
The 14095 Delhi Sarai Rohilla–Kalka Himalayan Queen Express covers the distance of 305 km (190 mi) in 5 hours 25 mins (56.31 km/h) and in 5 hours 50 mins as 14096 Kalka–Delhi Sarai Rohilla Himalayan Queen Express (52.29 km/h).

== Routeing ==
The 14095 / 14096 Delhi Sarai Rohilla–Kalka Himalayan Queen Express runs from Delhi Sarai Rohilla via Sonipat Junction, Panipat Junction, Kurukshetra Junction, Ambala Cantonment Junction, Chandigarh Junction to Kalka.

== Traction ==
As the route is fully electrified, a Ghaziabad-based WAP-7 locomotive powers the train for its entire journey.
