= Paschim Superfast Express =

Train in India

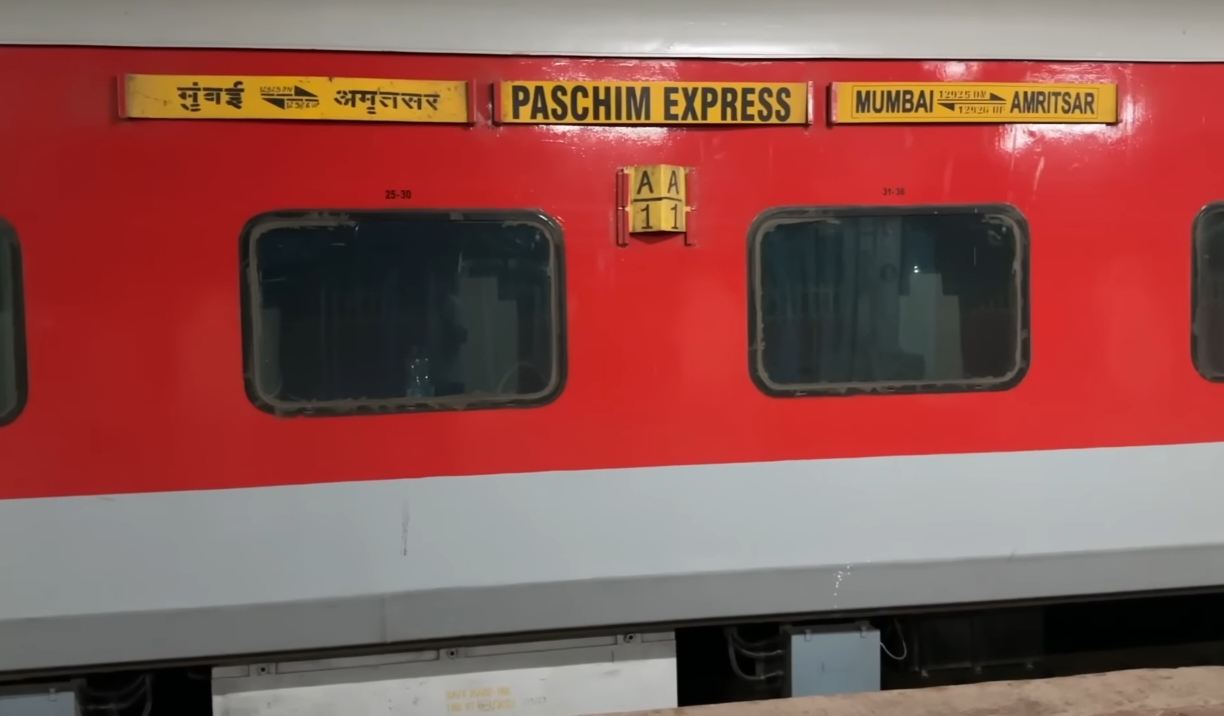
- Paschim Superfast Express at Mathura Jn.

Overview
- Service type: Superfast
- Locale: Maharashtra, Gujarat, Madhya Pradesh, Rajasthan, Uttar Pradesh, Haryana, Delhi & Punjab
- First service: 24 December 1956; 69 years ago
- Current operator: Western Railway

Route
- Termini: Bandra Terminus (BDTS); Amritsar Junction (ASR)
- Stops: 39
- Distance travelled: 1,877 km (1,166 mi)
- Average journey time: 32 hours 45 minutes
- Service frequency: Daily
- Train number: 12925 / 12926

On-board services
- Classes: AC First Class, AC 2 Tier, AC 3 Tier, Sleeper Class, General Unreserved
- Seating arrangements: Yes
- Sleeping arrangements: Yes
- Catering facilities: Available
- Observation facilities: Large windows
- Baggage facilities: Available
- Other facilities: Below the seats

Technical
- Rolling stock: LHB coach
- Track gauge: 1,676 mm (5 ft 6 in)
- Operating speed: 58 km/h (36 mph) average including halts.
Route map
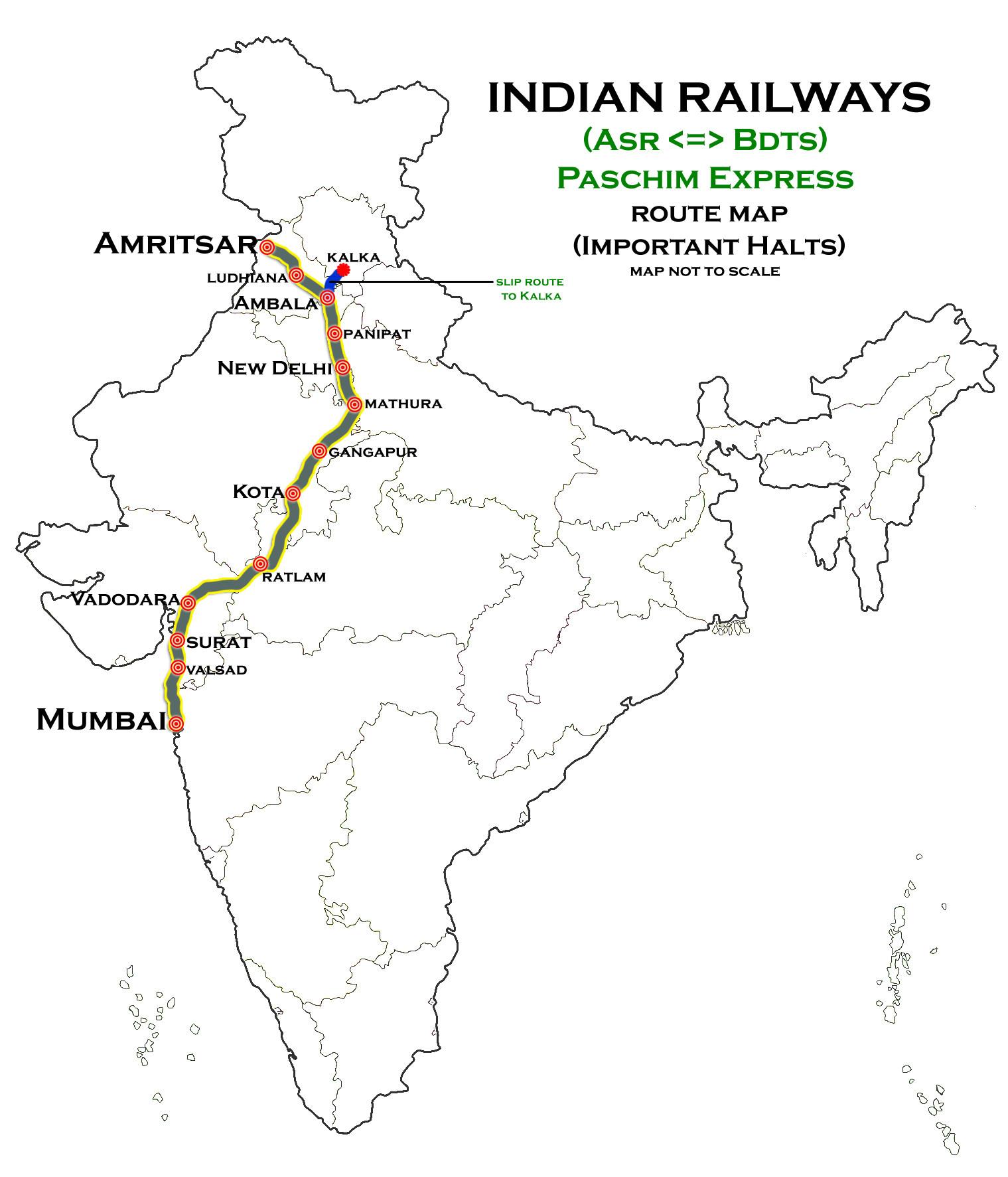

The 12925 / 12926 Paschim Superfast Express is a superfast express train belonging to Indian Railways. It runs between Bandra Terminus in Mumbai (Maharashtra) and Amritsar in Punjab.

It is a daily service. It operates as train number 12925 from Bandra Terminus to Amritsar and as train number 12926 in the reverse direction.

== Route & halts ==
- Mumbai Central
- Borivali
- Vapi
- Valsad
- Navsari
- Surat
- Vadodara Junction
- Godhra Junction
- Dahod
- Ratlam Junction
- Nagda
- Kota Junction
- Gangapur City
- Bharatpur Junction
- Mathura Junction
- Hazrat Nizamuddin
- New Delhi
- Panipat
- Karnal
- Ambala Cantonment
- Chandigarh
- Ludhiana
- Jalandhar City
- Beas Junction
- Amritsar

== Traction ==
It is hauled by a Vadodara Loco Shed based WAP-7 locomotive from end to end.

== See also ==
- Mumbai Central railway station
- Amritsar Junction railway station
- Golden Temple Mail
