= 12414 =

12414 may refer to:

- Bill 12414 that led to the 2025 anti-corruption protests in Ukraine
- The 12413 / 12414 Pooja Superfast Express train
