= Delhi–Pathankot Superfast Express =

Indian Express Super-Fast Train

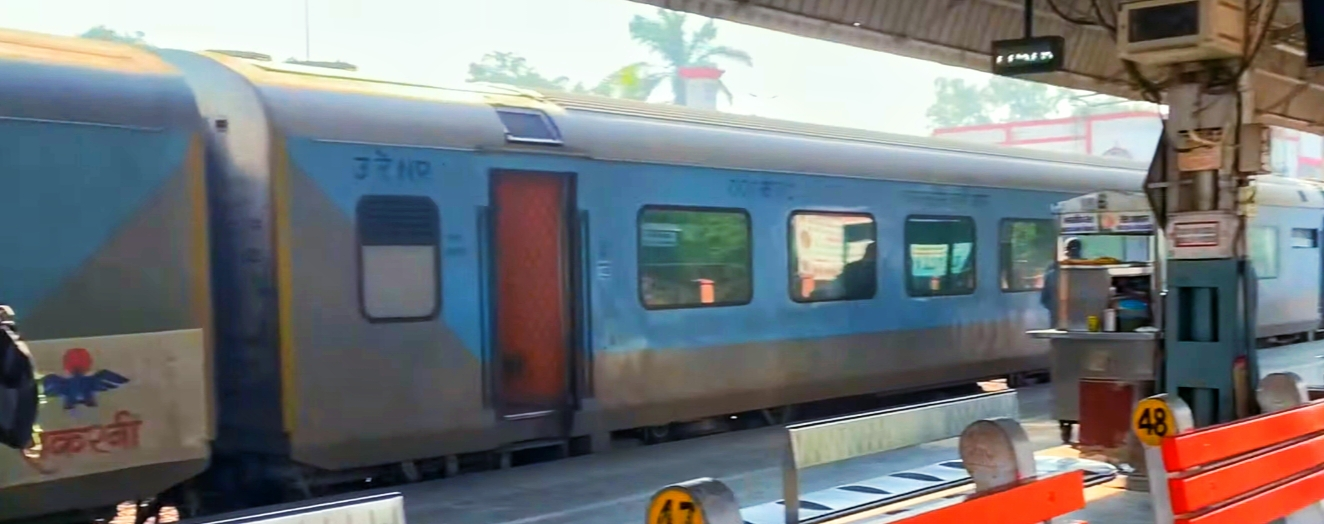
- Delhi–Pathankot Superfast Express At Karnal railway station

Overview
- Service type: Express
- Current operator: Northern Railway zone

Route
- Termini: Delhi Junction (DLI); Pathankot Junction (PTK)
- Stops: 13
- Distance travelled: 554 km (344 mi)
- Average journey time: 10h 5m
- Service frequency: Six (Note: Runs six days in a week for every direction.)
- Train number: 22429/22430

On-board services
- Classes: AC Chair Car, Chair Car, General Unreserved
- Seating arrangements: Yes
- Sleeping arrangements: No
- Catering facilities: On-board catering E-catering
- Observation facilities: LHB coach
- Entertainment facilities: No
- Baggage facilities: No
- Other facilities: Below the seats

Technical
- Rolling stock: 2
- Track gauge: 1,676 mm (5 ft 6 in)
- Operating speed: 55 km/h (34 mph), including halts

The Delhi–Pathankot Superfast Express is an Express train belonging to Northern Railway zone that runs between Old Delhi and Pathankot Junction in India. It is currently being operated with 22429/22430 train numbers on six days in a week basis.

== Service ==
The 22429/Delhi–Pathankot Superfast Express has an average speed of 55 km/h and covers 554 km in 10h 5m. The 22430/Pathankot–Delhi Superfast Express has an average speed of 55 km/h and covers 554 km in 10h 5m.

== Schedule ==
Train number	Station code	Departure station	Departure time	Departure days	Arrival station	Arrival time	Arrival days
22429	DLI	Old Delhi	8:25 AM	SUN MON TUE WED FRI SAT	Pathankot	6:30 PM	SUN MON TUE WED FRI SAT
22430	PTK	Pathankot	7:00 AM	SUN MON TUE WED THU SAT	Old Delhi	6:0 PM	SUN MON TUE WED THU SAT

== Route and stops ==
The important stops of the train are:

- Delhi Junction
- Panipat Junction
- Karnal
- Kurukshetra Junction
- Ambala Cantonment Junction
- Sirhind Junction
- Ludhiana Junction
- Jalandhar Cantonment Junction
- Beas Junction
- Amritsar Junction
- Batala Junction
- Dhariwal
- Gurdaspur
- Dinanagar
- Pathankot Junction

== Coach composition ==
The train used to run on old ICF coaches but now, has been converted into standard LHB rakes with a maximum speed of 110 km/h. The train consists of 16 coaches:

- 1 AC Chair Car
- 10 Chair Car
- 3 General Unreserved
- 2 Seating cum Luggage Rake

== Traction ==
Both trains are hauled by a Ghaziabad Loco Shed-based WAP-5 electric locomotive from Old Delhi to Pathankot and in return also.

== Direction reversal ==
The train reverses its direction once:

- Amritsar Junction

== See also ==
- Old Delhi railway station
- Pathankot Junction railway station
- Dhauladhar Express
