= New Delhi–Chandigarh Shatabdi Express =

Superfast express train in Indian

Chandigarh Junction - New Delhi Shatabdi Express

- Chandigarh-New Delhi Shatabdi Express At Karnal railway station

Overview
- Service type: Superfast Express, Shatabdi
- First service: 14 January 2013
- Current operator: Northern Railways

Route
- Termini: Chandigarh (CDG); New Delhi (NDLS)
- Stops: 2
- Distance travelled: 244 km (152 mi)
- Average journey time: 3 hours 20 minutes in both directions
- Service frequency: 6 days a week except Wednesday
- Train number: 12045 / 12046

On-board services
- Classes: Executive Class, AC Chair Car, Anubhuti Class
- Seating arrangements: Yes
- Sleeping arrangements: No
- Catering facilities: No Pantry car coach attached but available
- Observation facilities: LHB rake
- Baggage facilities: Overhead racks

Technical
- Rolling stock: Standard Indian Railways coaches
- Track gauge: 1,676 mm (5 ft 6 in)
- Operating speed: 130 km/h (81 mph) maximum between Adarsh Nagar Delhi(ANDI) and Ambala Cantonment Jn.(UMB),74 km/h (46 mph), including halts
Route map
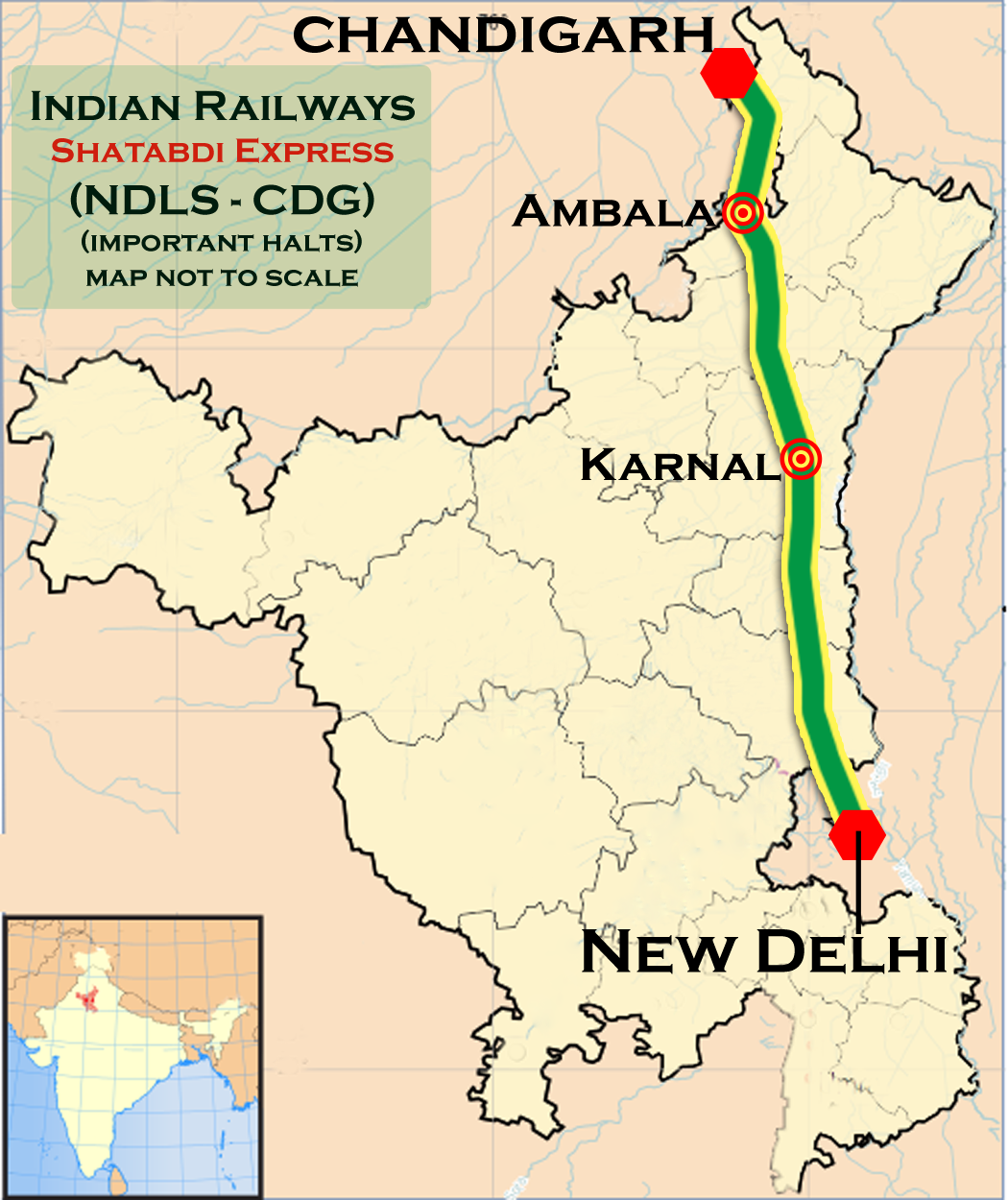

The 12046 / 45 Chandigarh-New Delhi Shatabdi Express is a Superfast Express train of the Shatabdi Express which belongs to Northern Railway zone that runs between Chandigarh and New Delhi in India.

It operates as train number 12046 from Chandigarh to New Delhi and as train number 12045 in the reverse direction serving the states of Chandigarh, Haryana & Delhi.

== Coaches ==
The 12046 / 45 Chandigarh New Delhi Shatabdi Express presently has 1 Executive Class and 9 AC Chair Car coaches. It does not have a Pantry Car Coach but Dining Services are provided on the train.

As with most train services in India, Coach Composition may be amended at the discretion of Indian Railways depending on demand.

	Loco	1	2	3	4	5	6	7	8	9	10	11	12	13
12045		EOG	C1	C2	C3	C4	C5	C6	C7	C8	C9	E1	E2	EOG
12046		EOG	E2	E1	C9	C8	C7	C6	C5	C4	C3	C2	C1	EOG

== Service ==
The 12046 / 45 Chandigarh New Delhi Shatabdi Express covers the distance of 244 kilometres in 3 hours 17 mins (74 km/h) in both directions.

As the average speed of the train is above 55 km/h, as per Indian Railways rules, its fare includes a Superfast Express surcharge.

== Routeing ==
The 12046 / 45 Chandigarh New Delhi Shatabdi Express runs from Chandigarh via Ambala Cantonment, Karnal to New Delhi.

== Loco link ==
As the route is fully electrified, a WAP 5 or WAP 7 from the Ghaziabad shed powers the train for its entire journey.

== Timings ==
The 12046 Chandigarh New Delhi Shatabdi Express leaves Chandigarh every day except Wednesday at 12:05 hrs IST and reaches New Delhi at 15:20 hrs IST the same day.

The 12045 New Delhi Chandigarh Shatabdi Express leaves New Delhi every day except Wednesday at 19:15 hrs IST and reaches Chandigarh at 22:35 hrs IST the same day.

== Gallery ==
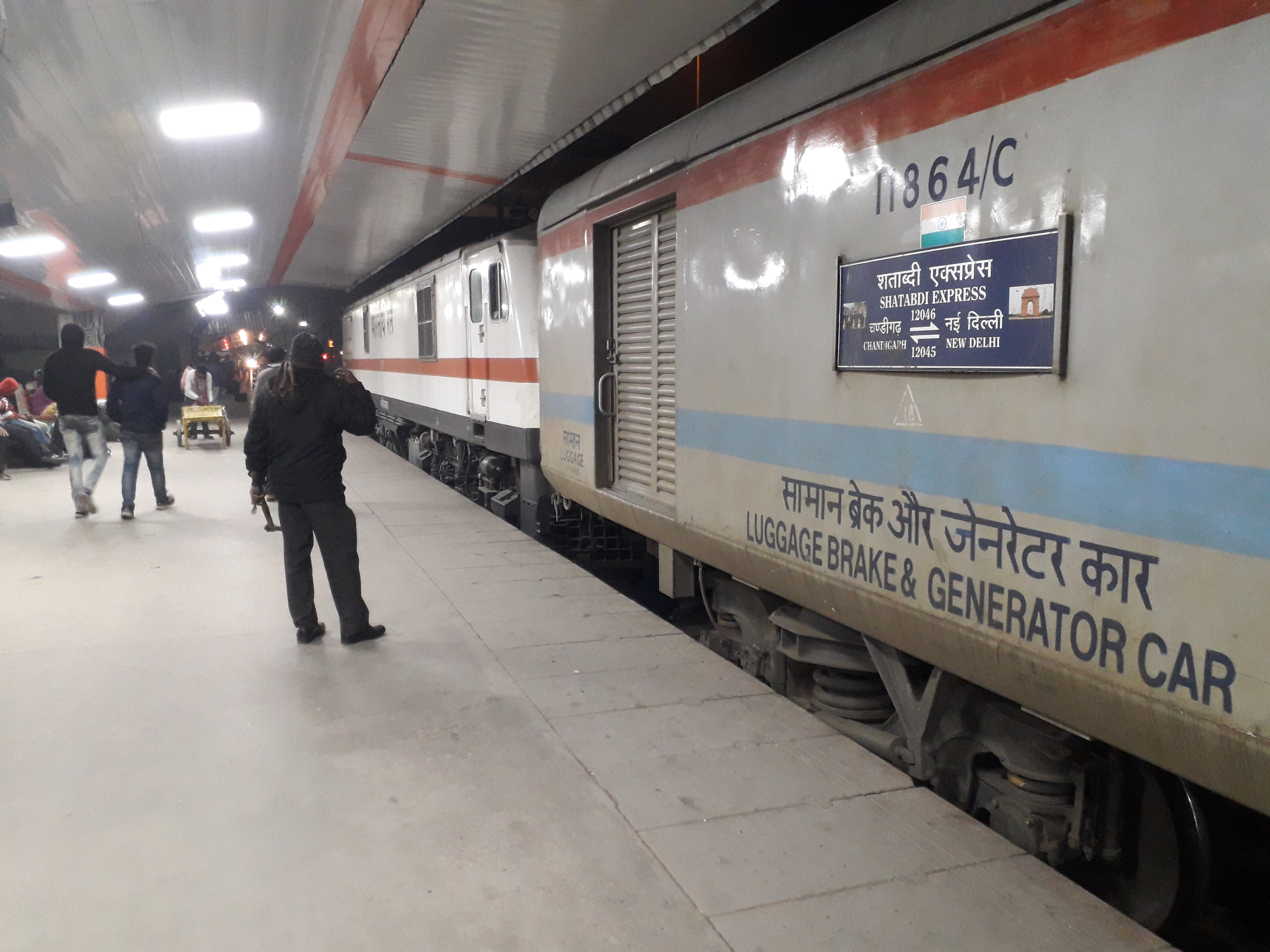
12045 Chandigarh Shatabdi Express with Ghaziabad based WAP 7

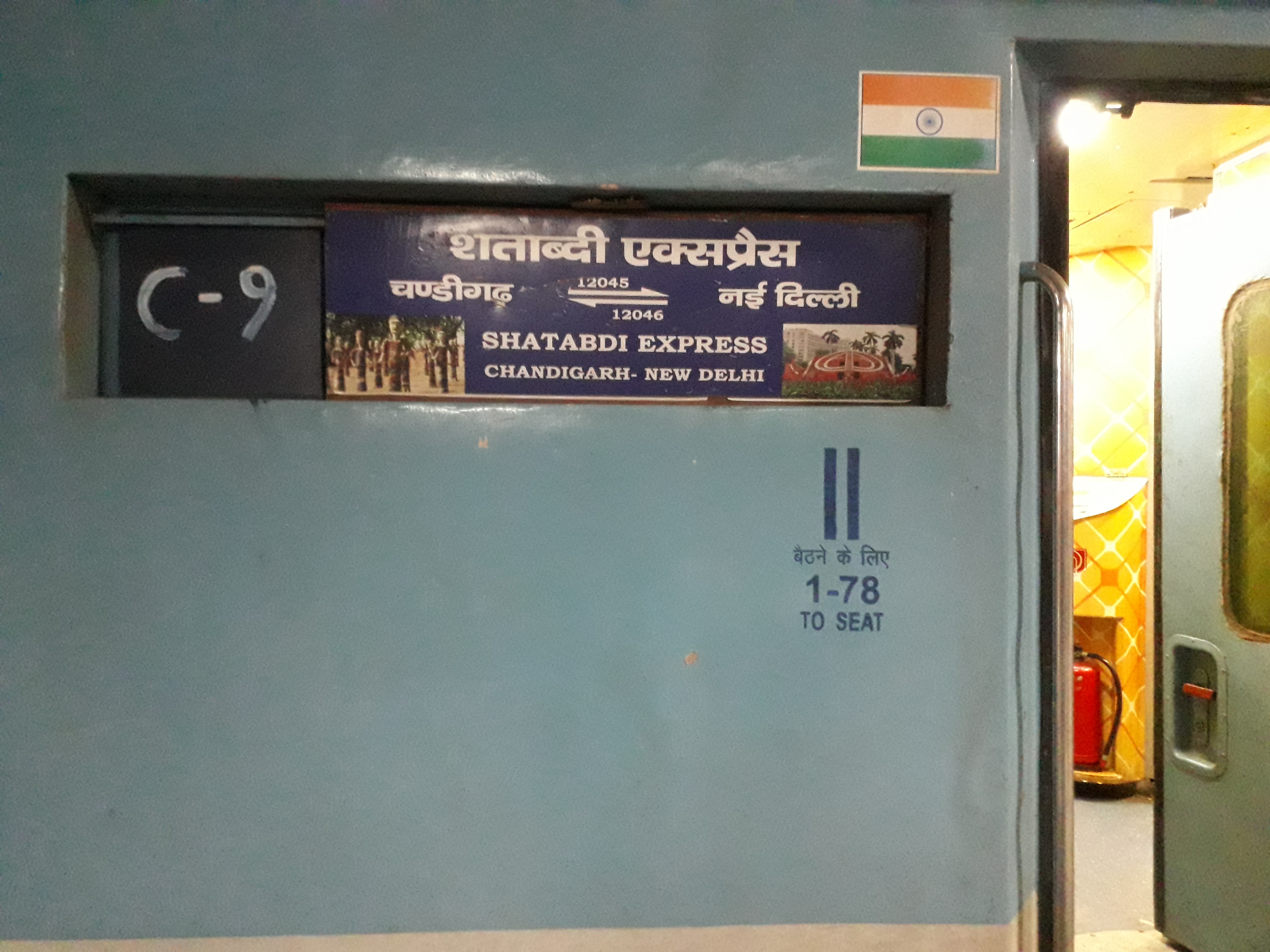
12045 Chandigarh Shatabdi Express - AC Chair Car C9

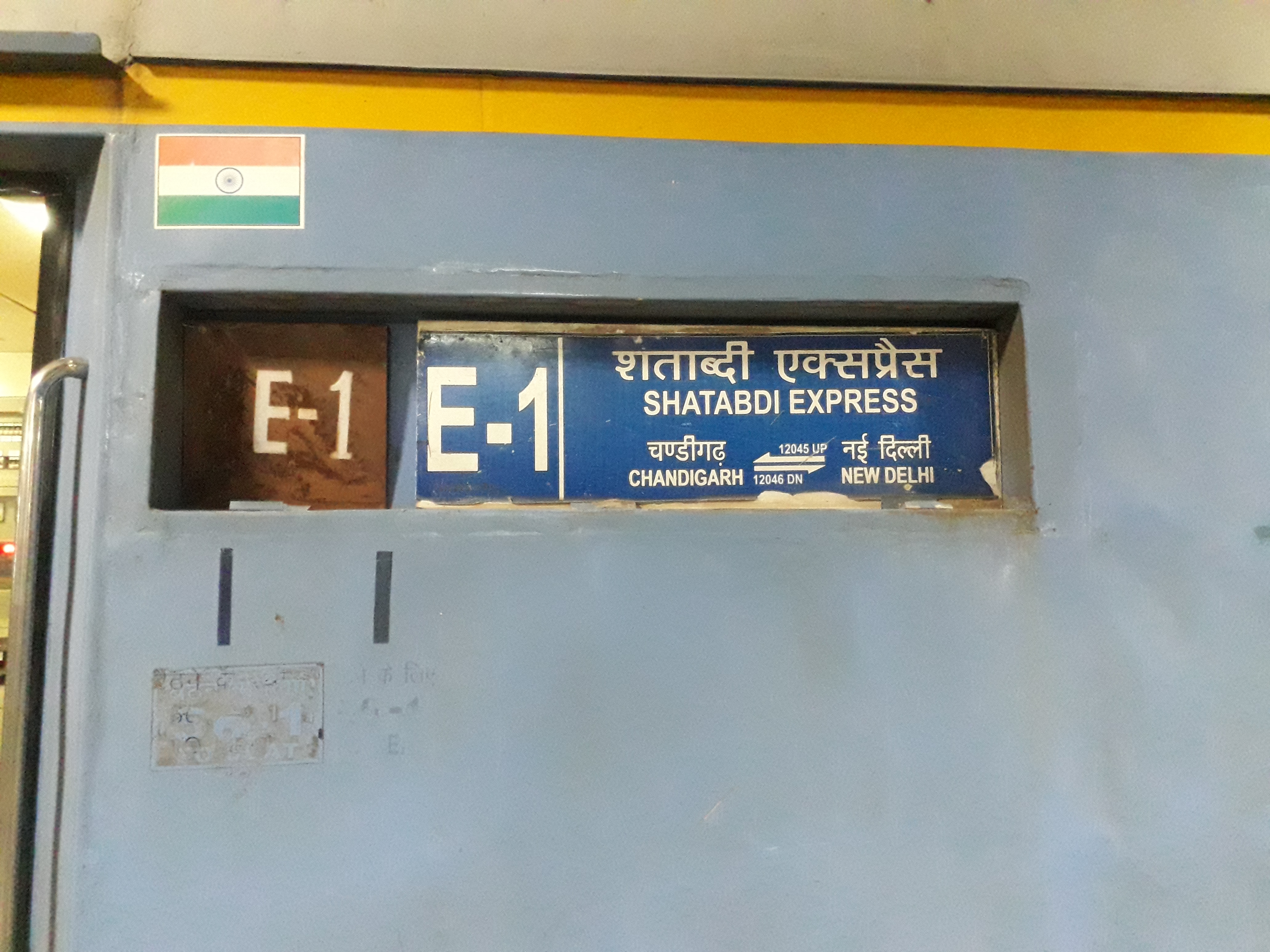
12045 Chandigarh Shatabdi Express - Executive Class coach

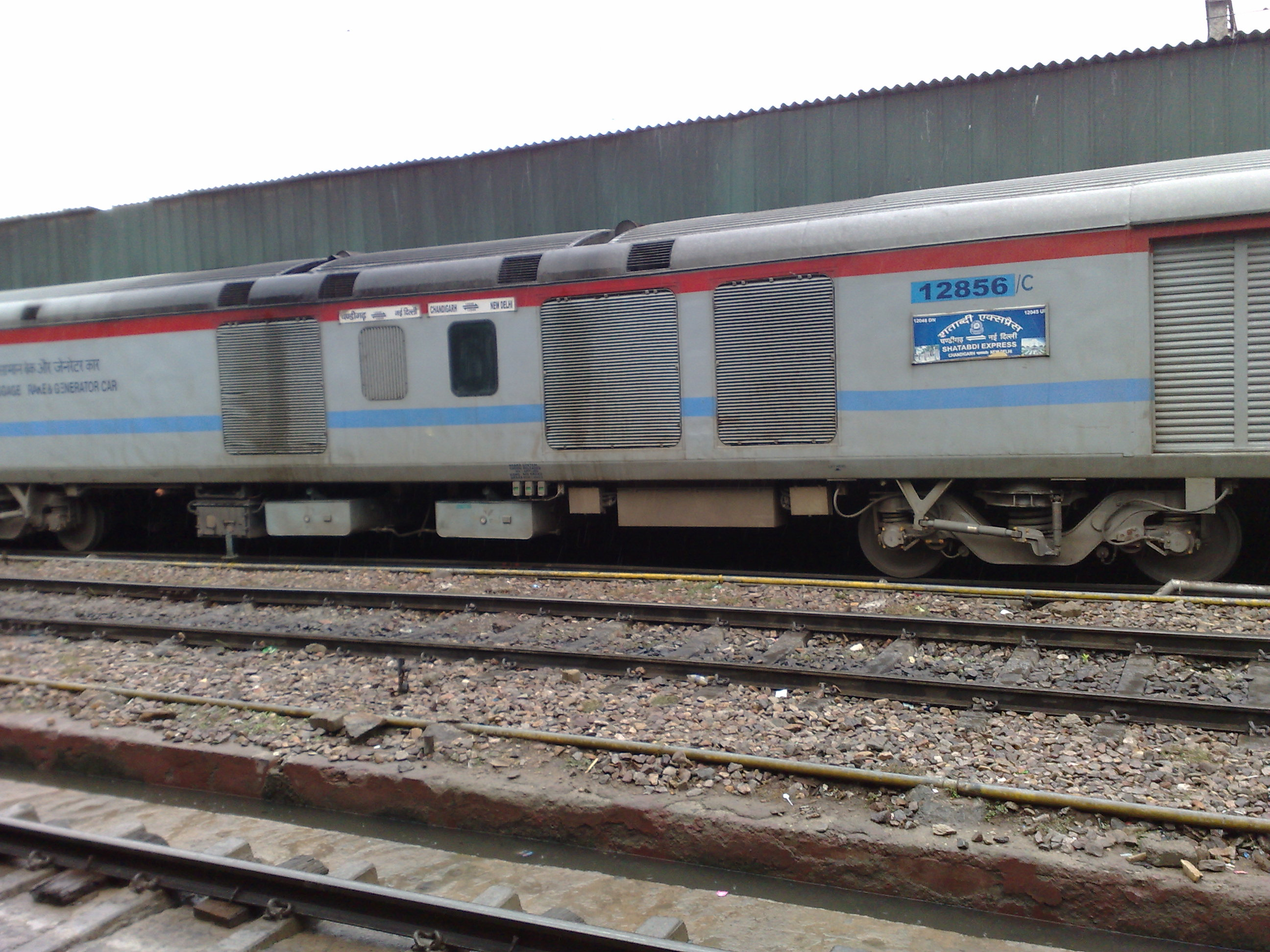
12046 Chandigarh Shatabdi Express - EOG coach
