= Nilokheri railway station =

Railway station in Haryana, India

Nilokheri

General information
- Location: State Highway 33, Nilokheri, Haryana; India
- Coordinates: 29.831885°N 76.925504°E
- Elevation: 253 metres (830 ft)
- System: Indian Railway Station
- Owner: Indian Railways
- Operator: Northern Railway
- Line: Delhi–Kalka line
- Platforms: 2

Construction
- Structure type: Standard on ground
- Accessible: Yes

Other information
- Status: Functioning
- Station code: NLKR
- Division(s): Delhi

Services
Preceding station	Indian Railways	Following station
Taraori towards ?	Northern Railway zone Delhi–Kalka line	Abhimanyupur towards ?
Location
- Location within India Location within Haryana

Nilokheri railway station is a station on the Delhi–Kalka line. It is located in the Indian state of Haryana. It serves Nilokheri and surrounding area

== The railway station ==
Nilokheri railway station is located at an altitude of 253 metres (830 ft) above mean sea level. It was allotted the railway code of NLKR under the jurisdiction of Delhi railway division.

== History ==
The Delhi–Ambala–Kalka line was opened in 1891.
