= Agra Cantonment–Hoshiarpur Express =

Train in India

Delhi–Hoshiarpur Express
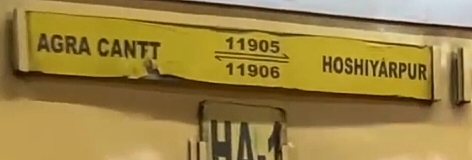

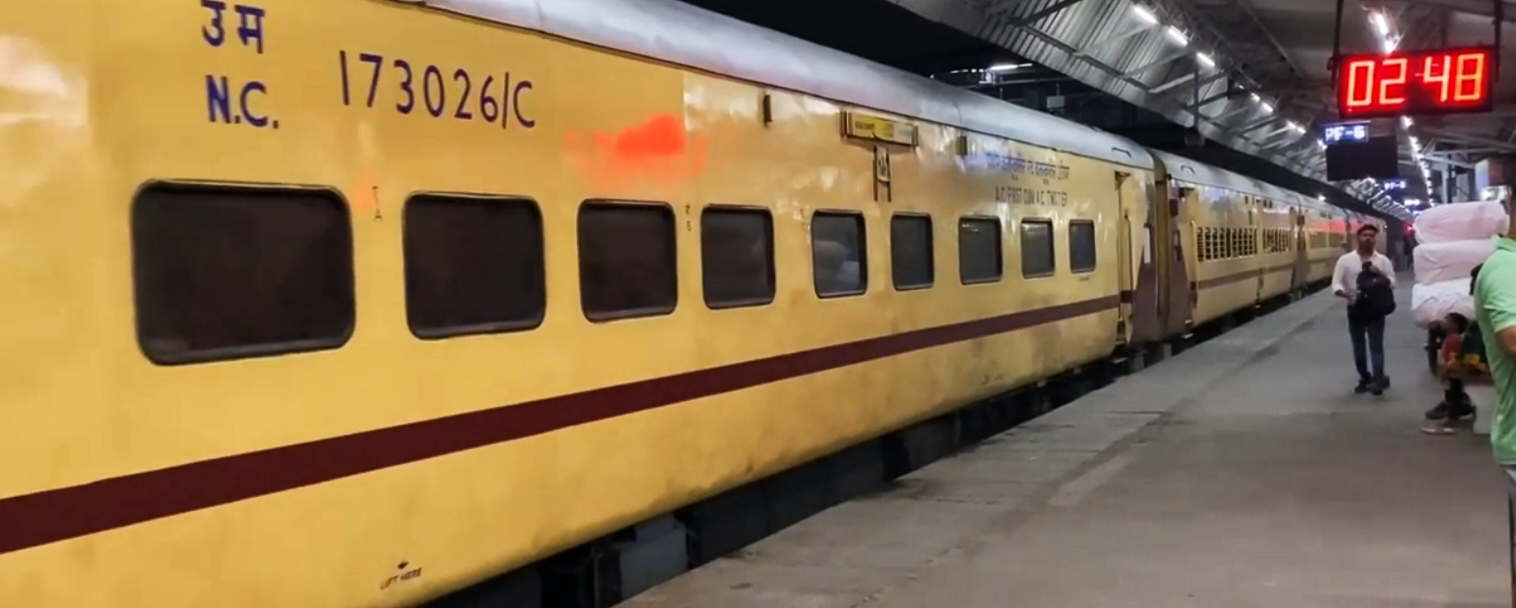
- Agra Cantt–Hoshiarpur Express At Ambala Cantonment Junction railway station

Overview
- Service type: Express
- First service: 5 October 2013; 12 years ago
- Current operator: North Central Railway zone

Route
- Termini: Agra Cantt Junction (AGC); Hoshiarpur (HSX)
- Stops: 17
- Distance travelled: 412 km (256 mi)
- Average journey time: 14h 10m
- Service frequency: daily
- Train number: 14011/14012

On-board services
- Classes: AC 2 tier, AC 3 tier, Sleeper class, General Unreserved
- Seating arrangements: No
- Sleeping arrangements: Yes
- Catering facilities: On-board catering E-catering
- Observation facilities: LHB coach
- Entertainment facilities: No
- Baggage facilities: No
- Other facilities: Below the seats

Technical
- Rolling stock: 2
- Track gauge: 1,676 mm (5 ft 6 in)
- Operating speed: 49 km/h (30 mph), including halts

The Agra Cantonment–Hoshiarpur Express is an Express train belonging to the North Central Railway zone that runs between Agra Cantt and Hoshiarpur in India. It is currently being operated with 11905/11906 train numbers on a daily basis.

== Service ==
The 11905/Agra Cantt–Hoshiarpur Express has an average speed of 46 km/h and covers 651 km in 14h 10m. The 11906/Hoshiarpur–Agra Cantt Express has an average speed of 56 km/h and covers 651 km in 12h 25m.

== Route and stops ==
The important stops of the train are:

- Delhi Junction
- Panipat Junction
- Ambala Cantonment Junction
- Ludhiana Junction
- Phagwara Junction
- Jalandhar City Junction
- Hoshiarpur

== Coach composition ==
The train has standard ICF rakes with a maximum speed of 110 km/h. The train consists of 17 coaches:

- 1 First AC and Second AC
- 1 AC II Tier
- 2 AC III Tier
- 5 Sleeper coaches
- 6 General
- 2 Seating cum Luggage Rake

== Traction ==
Both trains are hauled by a Ghaziabad Loco Shed-based WAP-5 or WAP-7 electric locomotive from Agra Cantt to Jalandhar and then by a Ludhiana Loco Shed-based WDM-3A diesel locomotive until Hoshiarpur and back.

== Direction reversal ==
The train reverses its direction once:

- Jalandhar City Junction

== See also ==
- Old Delhi railway station
- Hoshiarpur railway station
- Hoshiarpur–Jalandhar City Passenger
