= Dandoh =

Coordinates: 31°42′N 75°54′E

Dandoh is a village in the Hoshiarpur tehsil, Hoshiarpur district of Punjab, India. It is one of 415 villages in Hoshiarpur. The nearest railway station is Hoshiarpur railway station. The village is situated about 134.5 km from Chandigarh, the state capital.

== Demographics ==
There are a total of 195 resident families in Dandoh, with a total population of 919, of which 440 are male and 479 female, according to the Population Census of 2011. The village population of children aged 0-6 is 99, or 10.77% of the total. The average Sex Ratio of Dandoh village is 1089 which is higher than Punjab state average of 895. The Sex Ratio among children is 1106, compared to the Punjab average of 846. Dandoh village has a higher literacy rate than Punjab as a whole. In 2011, the literacy rate of was 86.34%, compared to 75.84% in Punjab. Male literacy stands at 90.84%, and female literacy at 82.20%. Punjabi and Hindi are the primary languages spoken in the village.

== Governance ==
As per the constitution of India and Panchyati Raaj Act, Dandoh village is administrated by a Sarpanch (Head of Village), who is the elected representative of the village.

== Geography ==
The village is situated at latitude 31.6959051 and longitude 75.8984154.
