= Bhiwani–Kalka Ekta Express =

Train in India

Ekta Express
Overview
- Service type: Express
- Current operator: Northern Railways

Route
- Termini: Bhiwani; Kalka
- Stops: 13
- Distance travelled: 299 km (186 mi)
- Average journey time: 6 hours 40 mins as 14795 Bhiwani Kalka Ekta Express, 6 hours 30 mins as 14796 Kalka Bhiwani Ekta Express
- Service frequency: Daily
- Train number: 14795 / 14796

On-board services
- Classes: AC Chair Car, Second Class Seating, General Unreserved
- Seating arrangements: Yes
- Sleeping arrangements: No
- Catering facilities: No

Technical
- Rolling stock: Standard Indian Railways coaches
- Track gauge: 1,676 mm (5 ft 6 in)
- Operating speed: 110 km/h (68 mph) maximum 45.42 km/h (28 mph) including halts.
Route map
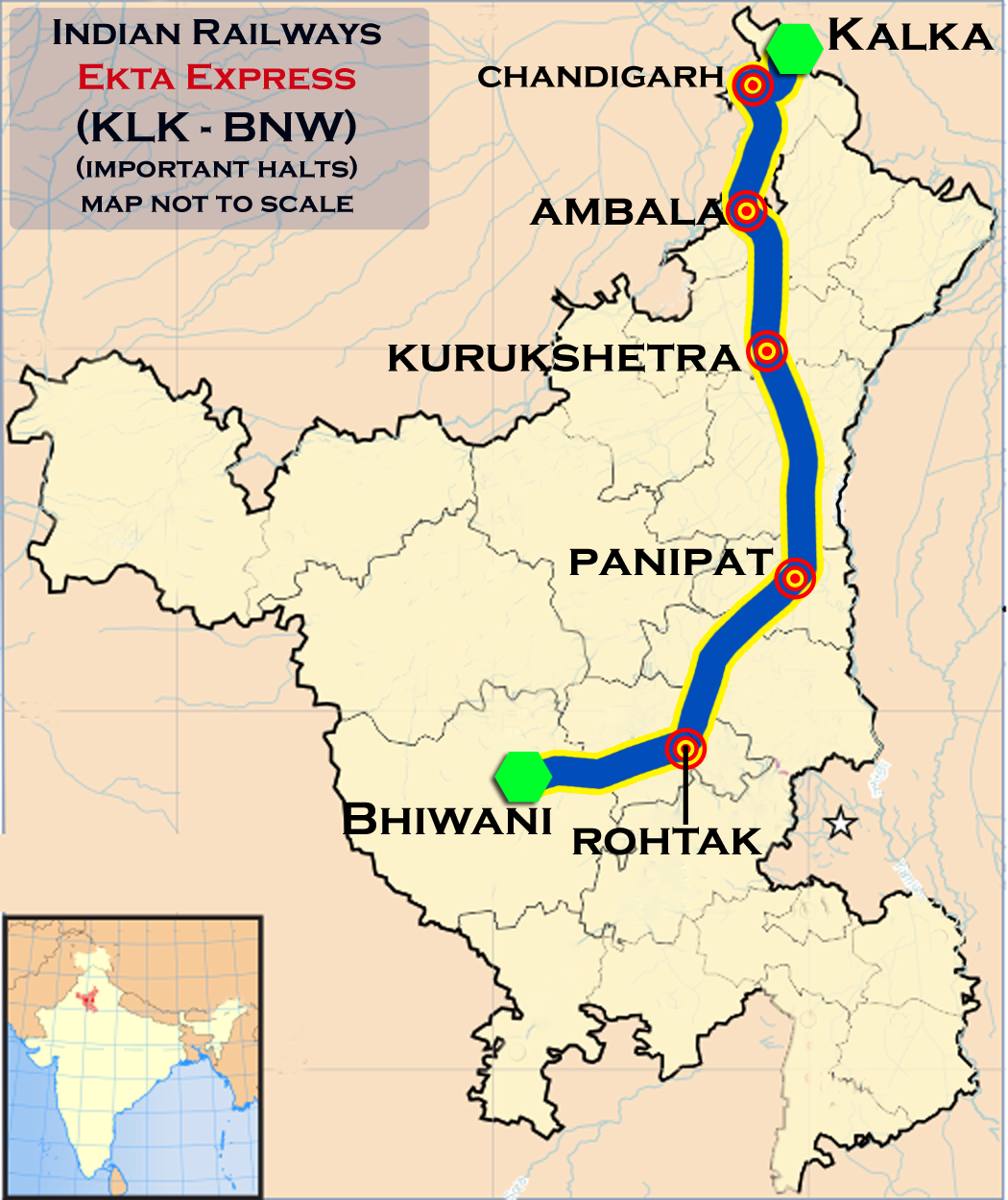

The 14795 / 96 Bhiwani–Kalka Ekta Express is an Express train belonging to Indian Railways – Northern Railway zone that runs between Bhiwani & Kalka in India.

It operates as train number 14795 from Bhiwani to Kalka and as train number 14796 in the reverse direction, serving the state of Haryana & the Union Territory of Chandigarh.

== Coaches ==
The 14795 / 96 Bhiwani–Kalka Ekta Express has 1 AC Chair Car, 8 Second Class seating, 6 General Unreserved & 2 SLR (Seating cum Luggage Rake) coaches. It does not carry a pantry car.

As is customary with most train services in India, coach composition may be amended at the discretion of Indian Railways depending on demand.

== Service ==
The 14795 Bhiwani–Kalka Ekta Express covers the distance of 299 km (186 mi) in 6 hours 40 mins (44.85 km/h) and in 6 hours 30 mins as 14796 Kalka–Bhiwani Ekta Express (46.00 km/h).

== Routing ==
The 14795 / 96 Bhiwani–Kalka Ekta Express runs from Bhiwani via Rohtak Junction, Panipat Junction, Kurukshetra Junction, Ambala Cantonment Junction, Chandigarh to Kalka.

== Traction ==
As the route is yet to be fully electrified, a Ludhiana-based WDM-3A locomotive powers the train between Bhiwani and Panipat Junction following which it is powered by a Ghaziabad-based WAP-7 for the remainder of its journey.
