= Fatehpur derailment =

2011 train wreck in Uttar Pradesh, India

Coordinates: 25°55′12″N 80°47′45″E

Details
- Date: 10 July 2011; 12:20 IST (UTC+05:30)
- Location: Fatehpur, Uttar Pradesh, India
- Country: India
- Line: Howrah–Delhi main line
- Operator: Indian Railways
- Incident type: Derailment
- Cause: sudden use of the emergency brake

Statistics
- Trains: 1 (Kalka Mail before it rebranded as Netaji Express in 2020s)
- Vehicles: WAP-7 locomotive
- Deaths: 70
- Injured: 300+
- Damage: 15 coaches derailed.

The Fatehpur derailment was the derailment of the train Kalka Mail with Howrah-based WAP-7 near Fatehpur, Uttar Pradesh, India on Sunday, 10 July 2011. Seventy people were killed and more than 300 injured in the derailment. Sources said that the train derailed following the sudden use of the emergency brake.

== Overview ==
The crash occurred at 12:20, when the 15 coaches of Howrah-Kalka Mail derailed near Malwan. The train had left Howrah and was heading towards Kalka when the incident happened. The number of passengers on board was not immediately known, though initial reports said that up to 1000 people were on the train at the time.

The train was travelling at the speed of 108 km/h on the Howrah – New Delhi Line when it derailed.

Fire and sparks were reported in the AC compartments of the train. The coaches were being cut with gas cutters and more than 200 policemen were involved in conducting rescue operations.

The Indian Army deployed 100 soldiers to the site, and two rescue trains from Kanpur and Prayagraj (Formerly known as Allahabad) also went to the location.

The Times of India reported that a fault in the rail track caused the derailment. The inquiry conducted by chief commissioner of railway safety in its preliminary report revealed that the cause of the derailment was "failure of equipment -permanent way", or a breakage in the rail track.
