= Pooja Superfast Express =

Train in India

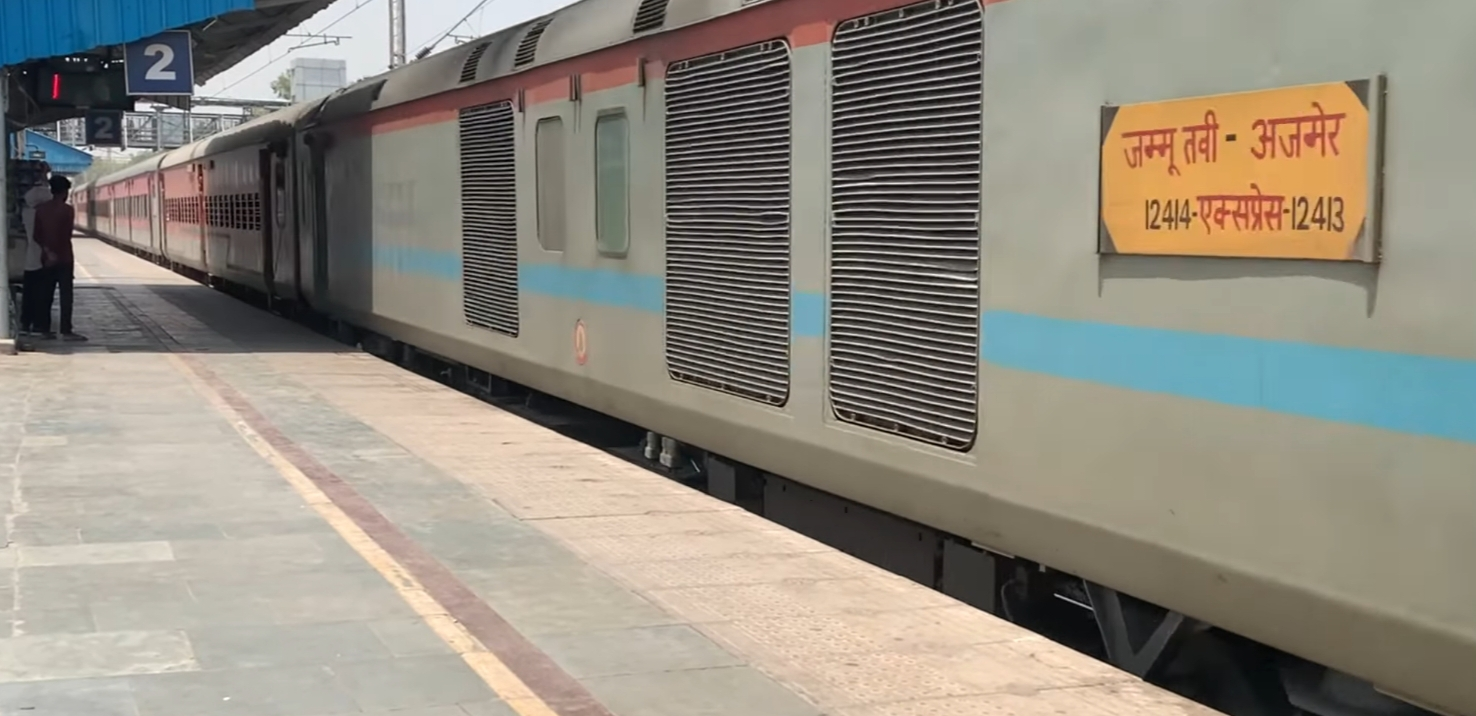
- Pooja SF Express At Panipat Junction

Overview
- Service type: Superfast
- Locale: Rajasthan, Haryana, New Delhi, Punjab & Jammu and Kashmir
- Current operator: Northern Railway

Route
- Termini: Ajmer Junction (AII); Jammu Tawi (JAT)
- Stops: 19
- Distance travelled: 1,018 km (633 mi)
- Average journey time: 17h 15m
- Service frequency: Daily
- Train number: 12413 / 12414

On-board services
- Classes: AC first, AC 2 tier, AC 3 tier, Sleeper class, Second class seating, General Unreserved
- Seating arrangements: Yes
- Sleeping arrangements: Yes
- Catering facilities: E-catering, On-board catering
- Observation facilities: Large windows
- Baggage facilities: Available

Technical
- Rolling stock: LHB coach
- Track gauge: 1,676 mm (5 ft 6 in) broad gauge
- Operating speed: 59 km/h (37 mph) average including halts
Route map
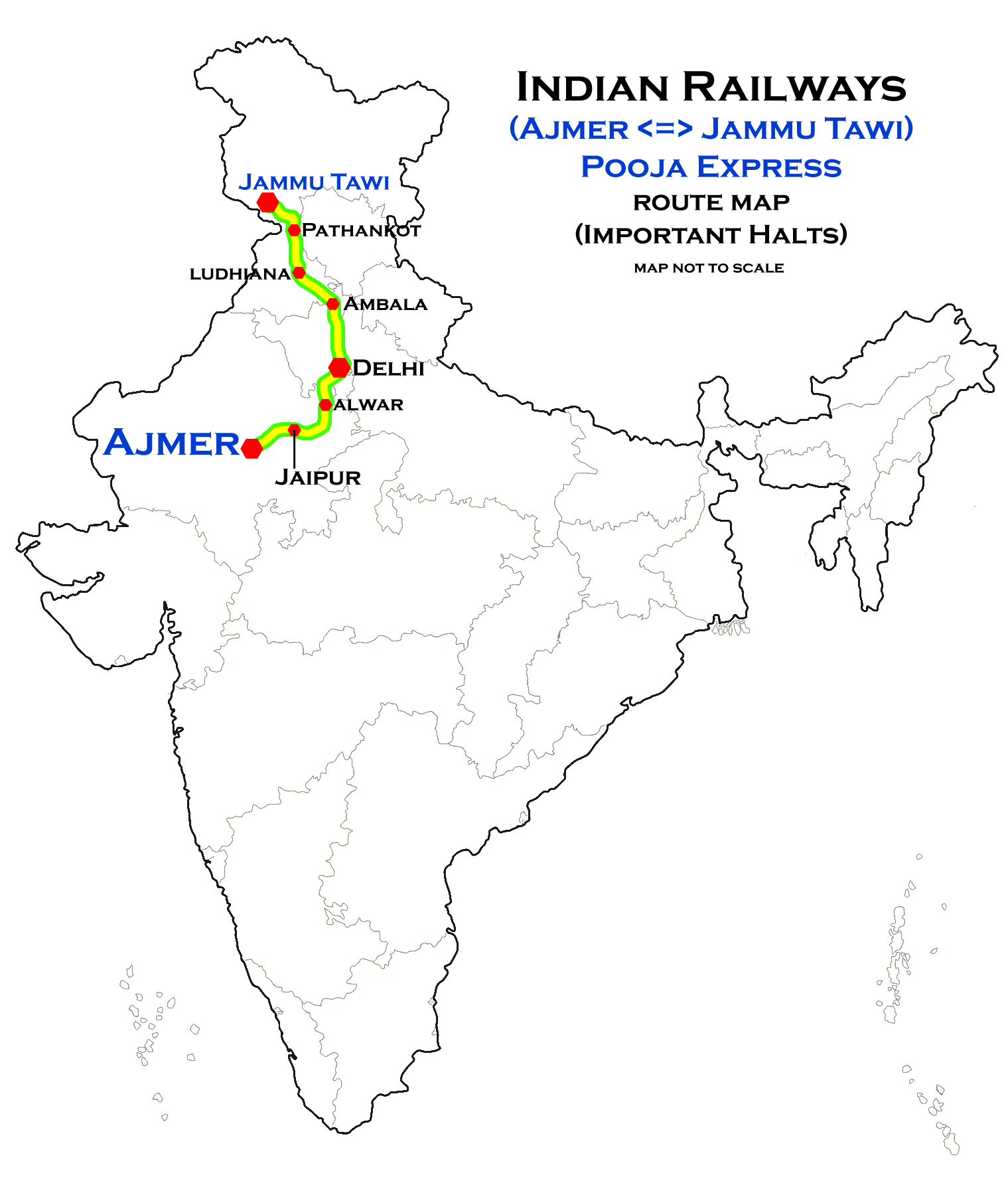

The 12413 / 12414 Pooja Superfast Express is a daily train departing from Ajmer Junction in Rajasthan to Jammu Tawi in Jammu and Kashmir in North India.

This train leaves Ajmer at 14:15 IST and reaches next day at Jammu Tawi at 7:30 IST in the morning covering a distance of 1018 km. It crosses a total of 21 railway stations, stopping anywhere from 2 to 30 mins, depending on the passenger movement.

== Schedule & route ==
Station name (code)	Arrives	Departs	Stop time	Distance travelled
Ajmer Jn (AII)	Starts	14:15	0	0 km
Kishangarh (KSG)	14:36	14:38	2 min	25 km
Phulera Jn (FL)	15:18	15:20	2 min	80 km
Jaipur (JP)	16:00	16:10	10 min	135 km
Gandhinagar Jpr (GADJ)	16:33	16:35	2 min	140 km
Dausa (DO)	17:14	17:26	2 min	196 km
Bandikui Jn (BKI)	17:39	17:41	2 min	225 km
Rajgarh (RHG)	17:57	17:59	2 min	250 km
Alwar (AWR)	18:39	18:42	3 min	286 km
Khairthal (KRH)	18:59	19:01	2 min	312 km
Rewari (RE)	20:15	20:17	2 min	360 km
Gurgaon (GGN)	20:58	21:00	2 min	412 km
Delhi Cantt (DEC)	21:20	21:22	2 min	429 km
Delhi Junction (DLI)	21:45	22:10	30 min	443 km
Karnal (KUN)	23:31	23:33	10 min	566 km
Ambala Cant Jn (UMB)	1:25	1:35	10 min	641 km
Ludhiana Jn (LDH)	3:17	3:27	10 min	754 km
Jalandhar Cant (JRC)	4:20	4:25	5 min	807 km
Pathankot Cantt (PTKC)	6:10	6:15	5 min	919 km
Kathua (KTHU)	6:46	6:48	2 min	942 km
Jammu Tawi (JAT)	8:20	Ends	0	1018 km

== Traction ==
earlier was WDP-4. The train is hauled by a Ghaziabad Loco Shed or Bhagat Ki Kothi Loco Shed-based WAP-7 and WAG-5 locomotive for its entire journey.
