= Netaji Express =

Train in India

Overview
- Service type: Superfast Express
- Locale: West Bengal, Jharkhand, Bihar, Uttar Pradesh, Delhi, Punjab & Haryana
- First service: 1 July 1866; 160 years ago
- Current operator: Eastern Railway

Route
- Termini: Howrah (HWH); Kalka (KLK)
- Stops: 38
- Distance travelled: 1,715 km (1,066 mi)
- Average journey time: 29 hrs 10 mins
- Service frequency: Daily
- Train number: 13051 / 13052

On-board services
- Classes: AC First Class, AC 2 Tier, AC 3 Tier, Sleeper Class, Unreserved
- Seating arrangements: Yes
- Sleeping arrangements: Yes
- Catering facilities: Available
- Observation facilities: Large windows
- Baggage facilities: Available
- Other facilities: Below the seats

Technical
- Rolling stock: LHB coach
- Track gauge: 1,676 mm (5 ft 6 in)
- Operating speed: 61 km/h (38 mph)

The 13501 / 13502 Netaji Express, formerly known as the Kalka Mail, is one of the oldest running trains in India, with a history spanning over 150 years. It operates between Howrah in Kolkata, the capital of West Bengal, and Kalka in Haryana via Gaya, Delhi & Chandigarh. Kalka serves as the railhead for the Kalka–Shimla Railway, a narrow-gauge line that connects to Shimla, which was the summer capital during the British Raj.

== History ==
In the late 1850s, the British Government in India decided to relocate their capital from Calcutta to Shimla during the summer months to protect the European population from the intense heat of the Bengal plains. To facilitate the annual migration of British officials, their families, and accompanying staff between the imperial capital at Calcutta and the summer capital in Shimla, the East Indian Railway Company inaugurated a train service on 1 July 1866. Departing from Howrah Railway Station, the service was designated as 1 UP (Up Line) / 2 DN (Down Line), known as the East Indian Railway Mail. Initially, this service operated exclusively between Howrah and Delhi.

The extension of the Ambala – Kalka railway line in 1891 enabled the East Indian Railway Mail to extend its route to Kalka. The subsequent opening of the Kalka – Shimla route on 7 November 1903, facilitated the further extension of the train service to Shimla, involving a gauge change at Kalka. Passengers traveling to Shimla from Kalka transitioned from a broad gauge train to a narrow gauge East Indian Railway Mail for the final leg of the journey. Notably, both Howrah and Kalka stations featured internal carriageways along the platforms to allow the Viceroy and other dignitaries to access their rail coaches directly. The carriageway at Howrah remains in use between Platforms 8 and 9, while the carriageway at Kalka has been repurposed into a platform.

The revered freedom fighter Netaji Subash Chandra Bose boarded this train from Gomoh on the night of 17 January 1941 while escaping the British Raj to Peshawar. With the rationalisation of train numbering system in the 1990s, the iconic designation 01 UP / 02 DN was discontinued. On 10 July 2011 this train was involved in a derailment at Malwan station in Fatehpur district that killed 70 and injured 300. Utkrisht rakes were introduced on the train on 2 October 2018, making it the first train in Indian Railways to do so. The train was renamed to Netaji Express on 21 January 2021, in honor of Netaji Subash Chandra Bose's 125th birth anniversary. On July 14, 2025, the train was upgraded with modern Linke-Hoffman Busch coaches, making it the first passenger train to continue its slip service with LHB coaches. (Note: In Indian Railways, when a train receives LHB coaches, either the slip service is permanently cancelled or the train serves both the destinations, but with a reduced frequency.)

== Timings ==
- 12311 departs Howrah at 21:55 IST and reaches Kalka at 03:00 IST on the third day.
- 12312 departs Kalka at 23:55 IST and reaches Howrah at 08:05 IST on the third day.

== Coach composition ==
Earlier was ICF coaches and 2018 is ICF Utkrisht rakes. The train now runs with 22 LHB coach, consisting of General (GEN), Sleeper (SL), Third AC (3A), Second AC (2A) and First AC (1A) classes. It has four rakes. The primary maintenance is executed at Sorting Yard Coaching Complex, Liluah.

Legends
EOG/SLR	PC	MIL	H	A	HA	B	AB	G	K	E	C	S	D	GEN/UR
Generator cum luggage van	Pantry car or Hot buffet car	Military coach	First AC (1A)	Second AC (2A)	First AC cum Second AC	Third AC (3A)	Third AC cum Second AC	Third AC economy (3E)	Anubhuti coach (K)	Executive chair car (EC)	AC Chair car (CC)	Sleeper class (SL)	Second seating (2S)	General or Unreserved
	Loco and other service coach													
	AC coach													
	Non-AC coach													

Coach position of 13501

Loco	1	2	3	4	5	6	7	8	9	10	11	12	13	14	15	16	17	18	19	20	21	22
	EOG	GEN	GEN	S1	S2	S3	PC	B1	A1	A2	B3	B2	B3	B4	H1	S4	S5	S6	S7	GEN	GEN	EOG

Coach position of 13502

Loco	1	2	3	4	5	6	7	8	9	10	11	12	13	14	15	16	17	18	19	20	21	22
	EOG	GEN	GEN	S7	S6	S5	S4	H1	B4	B3	B2	B1	A3	A2	A1	PC	S3	S2	S1	GEN	GEN	EOG

The first nine coaches of the Kalka bound 13501 (i.e. the EOG-GEN-GEN-S1-S2-S3-PC-B1-A1 part) consist of the slip service to Chandigarh. They are detached from the train at Chandigarh and a seating cum luggage (SLR) coach is attached in front of A2. On the train's return journey to Howrah as 13502, these coaches are re-attached and the SLR coach is removed. This is done as the platforms at Kalka are too short to accommodate the full 22 coach rake. Passengers are advised to check the coach position indicator at the station before boarding.

== Traction ==
The train is hauled by a Howrah Loco Shed based WAP-5 / WAP-7 electric locomotives on its entire journey.

== In popular culture ==
This train is featured in a short story by Satyajit Ray, the Indian film director and writer. In the story, The Mystery of the Kalka Mail (Baksho Rahasya), the three main characters travel from Calcutta to Delhi and on to Kalka on the train. The plot involves a stolen diamond and an unpublished manuscript. The story was also made into a radio play and a film.

== Accidents ==
=== Fatehpur derailment, 2011 ===
15 coaches of the Kalka Mail derailed on the Kanpur-Fatehpur line near the Fatehpur railway station on the afternoon of 10 July 2011. Causation is unsolved though poor maintenance of the locomotive is suspected because the engine had begun swaying sideways just before the accident. More than 70 persons died and 300 were injured. The injured were taken to hospitals in Kanpur, Lucknow and Allahabad.
