= Kalka =

- City
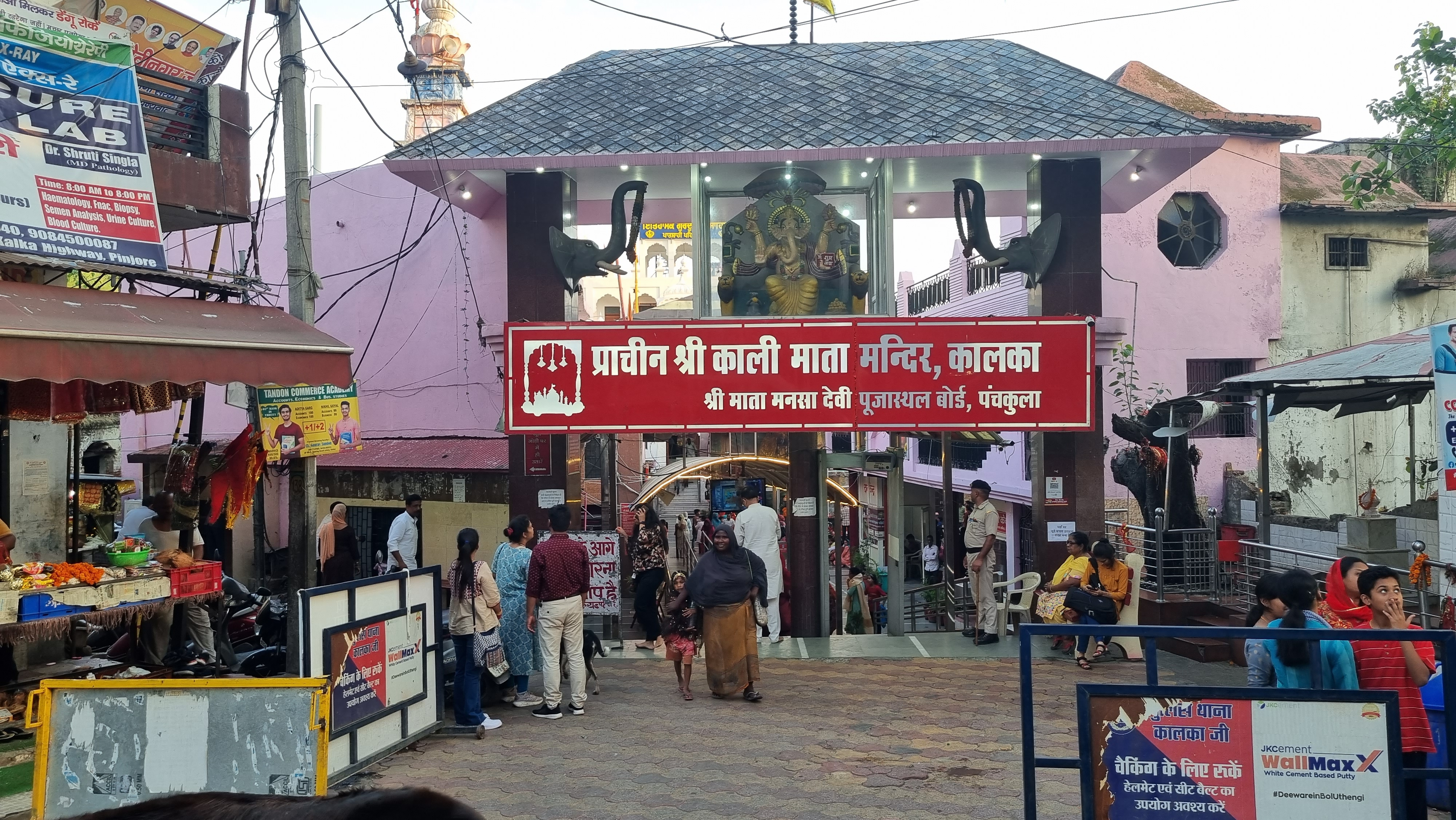
- Kalka Mandir situated at the entrance of the city from Shimla

- Location within Haryana Location within India
- Coordinates: 30.83°N 76.93°E
- Country: India
- State: Haryana
- District: Panchkula
- Nearest cities: Panchkula; Chandigarh; Mohali; Ambala; Solan; Baddi; Shimla
- Founded: 1842
- Elevation: 656 m (2,152 ft)

Population (2011)
  - Total: 34,134

Languages
  - Official: Hindi
  - Native: Mahasui (Baghati)
- Time zone: UTC+5.30
- Post code: 133302
- Area code: 01733
- Vehicle registration: HR-49

Kalka is a city in the Panchkula district of Haryana, India. It is near Panchkula city. The name of the town is derived from the Hindu goddess Kali. Kalka is situated in the foothills of the Himalayas and is a gateway to Himachal Pradesh; it is located on the National Highway 5 between Chandigarh and Shimla, near Solan and it is the terminus of the Kalka-Shimla Railway. To the south of Kalka is Pinjore, and the industrial village of Parwanoo (Himachal Pradesh) is to the north on NH 22. Railways and Industrial development have led to a continuous urban belt from Pinjore to Parwanoo, but Kalka gained major economic benefits due to being the only highway destination until 2010 from Shimla. It is the tehsil of 253 nearby sub-villages. Nearby is Chandimandir Cantonment, where the Western Command of the Indian army is based. In 2013, the municipal committee of Kalka was dissolved and the administration was reassigned to Panchkula Municipal Corporation.

== History ==
The town takes its name from Kalika Maa the ruling deity. Kalka was acquired by British India from the Princely state of Patiala in 1843 as a stopover and depot for the Simla, the summer capital of the Raj. In 1846, it was transferred to the Shimla district and in 1899 to the Ambala district. The main center part was established by Pundir Rajputs of Haryana and the area was under them and this town was governed by local Rajputi zamindars. In the 1800s, the British occupied the land from local zamindars for rail development, which led to an economic boost for the town. It became the junction for the Delhi-Panipat-Ambala-Kalka railway line, and the Kalka-Shimla railways (opened in 1903). By 1901, the town, administered as a notified area, had a population of 7,045, a railway workshop, and a market for ginger and turmeric. The Kalka municipal committee was created on 11 April 1933.

== Climate ==
Kalka experiences a subtropical climate, with a monsoon season from late June to early October. The summer starts in mid-April and temperatures peak during May and June. This is followed by the monsoon season, which is accompanied by a drop in temperature and an increase in humidity. Temperatures remain moderate in October and November, but start falling towards the end of November. Winter lasts through December, January, and February, with temperatures lowest in early January. Kalka also receives some rainfall from Western Disturbance, near the end of winter. Winter season, despite being chilly, is mostly free of fog, unlike most North Indian cities in the plains.

Climate data for Kalka
Month	Jan	Feb	Mar	Apr	May	Jun	Jul	Aug	Sep	Oct	Nov	Dec	Year
Mean daily maximum °C (°F)	18.1 (64.6)	21 (70)	26.2 (79.2)	32.2 (90.0)	36.7 (98.1)	36.7 (98.1)	31.5 (88.7)	30.3 (86.5)	31.1 (88.0)	29.3 (84.7)	25.3 (77.5)	20.7 (69.3)	28.3 (82.9)
Mean daily minimum °C (°F)	6.2 (43.2)	8.1 (46.6)	12.8 (55.0)	17.7 (63.9)	22.6 (72.7)	24.8 (76.6)	23.7 (74.7)	23.1 (73.6)	21.7 (71.1)	16 (61)	10.2 (50.4)	7.1 (44.8)	16.2 (61.1)
Average rainfall mm (inches)	73 (2.9)	51 (2.0)	55 (2.2)	17 (0.7)	30 (1.2)	104 (4.1)	428 (16.9)	339 (13.3)	200 (7.9)	53 (2.1)	12 (0.5)	29 (1.1)	1,391 (54.9)
Source: climate-data.org

== Transport ==
=== Road ===
Kalka is situated along a slope. This makes it somewhat difficult to commute on foot. Local transport (within Kalka) is by shared auto-rickshaws. These autos ply to a distance of around 15–20 km. There are also shared cabs for distances up to 25–30 km. Government and private buses are also very common for commuting to nearby cities. Many intercity govt buses start or pass through Kalka, connecting it with Chandigarh, Ambala, Panipat, Delhi, Shimla, and many other cities.

=== Rail ===
Kalka railway station is the northern terminal of the Delhi-Kalka line of Northern Railway, Indian Rail (Station code KLK) serving as terminal station for broad gauge line (towards Chandigarh) and narrow gauge line (towards Shimla). Direct trains on broad gauge, connect to Delhi, Howrah etc. In recent years, trains have been started from Kalka to Shirdi, Maharashtra, and to Katra, Jammu which run on specific days of the week.

=== Kalka Shimla Railway ===
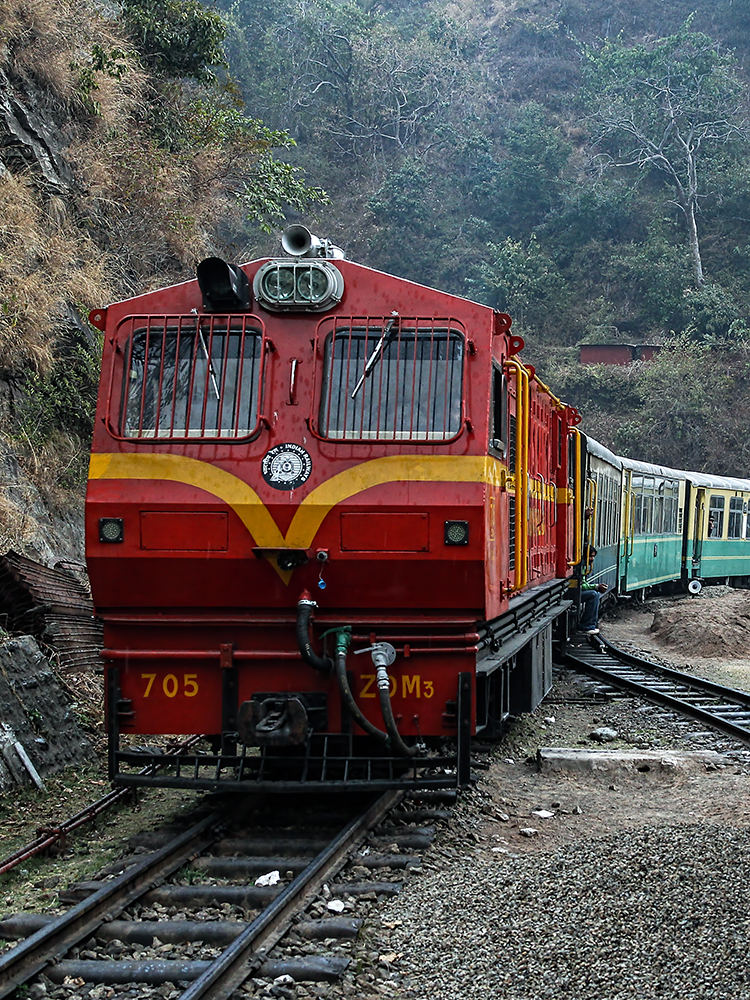
Train on way from Kalka to Shimla

The Kalka Shimla Railway features on the UNESCO's World Heritage Sites list. Work on the railway line started in 1898 and it opened for traffic in 1903.

== Demographics ==
According to the 2011 census, the population of Kalka is 34,314. The Kalka Metropolitan area population is 86,550, which consists of the adjoining cities of Kalka, Pinjore, and Parwanoo. The local language is Baghati but Punjabi, Haryanvi, and Hindi is also used by the residents in the town.

=== Languages ===
Languages spoken in Kalka Town (2011)
1. Hindi (83.3%)
2. Punjabi (9.01%)
3. Haryanvi (1.58%)
4. Baghati Pahari (1.51%)
5. Bhojpuri (1.35%)
6. Maithili (0.41%)
7. Others (2.57%)

=== Religion ===
Hinduism is the predominant religion in the town which consists of 81.54%. Sikhism is the Second most followed religion which consists of 13.02%. Islam and other religions create minorities in the town.

1. Hinduism (81.5%)
2. Sikhism (13.0%)
3. Islam (4.58%)
4. Christianity (0.65%)
5. Others (0.43%)

== Places of interest ==
=== Kalika Devi temple ===
The ancient temple of the Hindu goddess Kali is situated on the National Highway 22 that runs through Kalka town. The temple is visited by devotees who pay their respects annually during the Navratri. According to oral tradition, the original temple was built by Pandavas of Mahabharata of Vedic era during their Agyatvas (exile) when they stayed here for some time.

Annual religious mela (fair) is held in March–April every year.

=== Shri Trimurtidham Balaji Hanuman Temple ===
Sri Trimurti Dham is situated amidst the Shivalik Hills. It is located on a hilltop beside the eastern fringe of Kalka town in the district. Panchkula (Haryana) overlooking the industrial city Parwanoo. The literal meaning of 'Sri Trimurti Dham' is "a place where Teen Murtis (three idols) exist together".
