= Hoshiarpur railway station =

Railway station in Punjab, India

Hoshiarpur Railway Station

General information
- Location: Phagwara Road-Hoshiarpur, Punjab; India
- Coordinates: 31.5242°N 75.9059°E
- Elevation: 300 metres (980 ft)
- System: Indian Railways station
- Owner: Indian Railways
- Operator: Firozpur railway division
- Platforms: 1
- Tracks: 4
- Connections: Auto stand

Construction
- Structure type: Standard (on-ground station)
- Parking: No
- Cycle facilities: No

Other information
- Status: Functioning
- Station code: HSX
- Fare zone: Northern Railway
Location

Hoshiarpur railway station is a main railway station in Hoshiarpur district, Punjab. Its code is HSX. It serves Hoshiarpur city. The station consists of one platform. The platform is not well sheltered. It lacks many facilities including water and sanitation. The station was constructed in 1905

Recently the station has been upgraded (under Amrit Bharat scheme) with some facilities developed like drinking water facility, the route from Hoshiarpur till Jalandhar has been electrified, though the no of platforms remain one only.

== Trains ==
The DEMU's travel to and from Hoshiarpur till Jalandhar City 5 times a day with earliest one starting at 5:00 am and last DEMU at 20:50 hrs.

Apart from DEMU, there is a passenger train from Hoshiarpur till Jalandhar City and an express train from Hoshiarpur till Agra Cantt.

- Hoshiarpur–Jalandhar City DEMU [74923, 74913, 74915, 74917 & 74919]
- Hoshiarpur - Agra Cantt. Express [11906- departure from HSX daily at 22:30 hrs]
- Hoshiarpur–Jalandhar City Passenger [54637 daily 12:35 pm from HSX]
