= Kalka railway station =

Railway station in Himachal Pradesh

Kalka
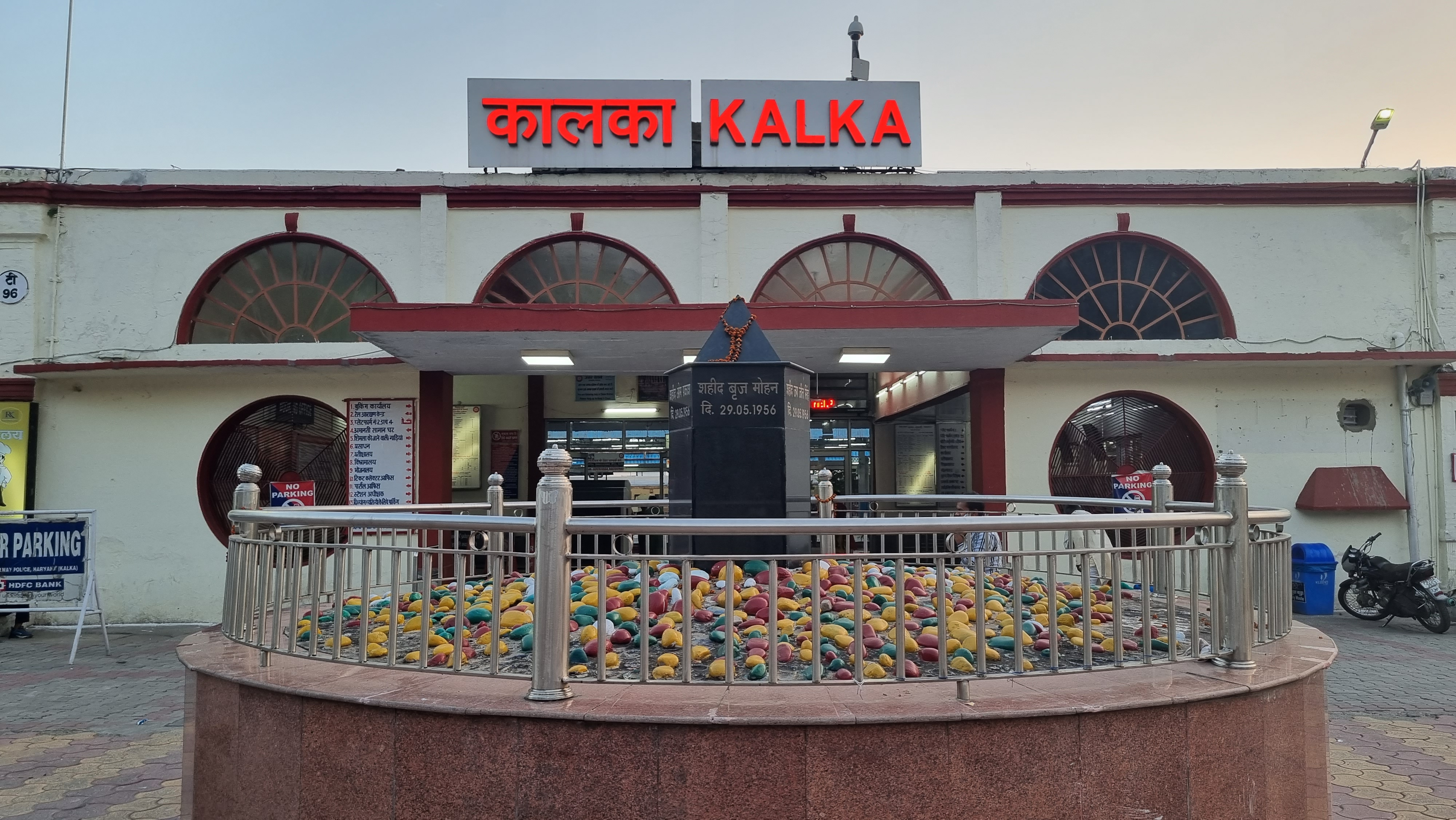
- Front view of the Kalka railway station entrance

General information
- Location: Kalka-Shimla Highway, Kalka, Panchkula District, Haryana; India
- Coordinates: 30°50′18″N 76°55′55″E
- Elevation: 658 metres (2,159 ft)
- System: Indian Railways station
- Owner: Ministry of Railways (India)
- Operator: Indian Railways
- Lines: Delhi–Kalka line Kalka–Shimla Railway
- Platforms: 7
- Tracks: 9

Construction
- Structure type: At grade
- Parking: Yes
- Cycle facilities: No

Other information
- Status: Functioning
- Station code: KLK
- Zone(s): Northern Railway
- Division(s): Ambala

History
- Opened: 1891
- Electrified: 1999–2000
Location
- Location within India Location within Haryana

Kalka Railway Station is the northern terminus of the Delhi–Kalka line, and the starting point of the UNESCO World Heritage Site Kalka–Shimla Railway. It serves passengers from Kalka, Haryana, moving on to Delhi and Shimla.

== Description ==
Kalka railway station is located at an altitude of 658 metres (2,159 ft) above mean sea level. It was allotted the railway code of KLK under the jurisdiction of Ambala railway division.

== History ==
The Delhi–Panipat–Ambala–Kalka line was opened in 1891.

The 610 mm (2 ft)-wide narrow-gauge Kalka–Shimla Railway was constructed by Delhi–Panipat–Ambala–Kalka Railway Company and opened for traffic in 1903. In 1905 the line was regauged to 762 mm (2 ft 6 in)-wide narrow gauge.

== Electrification ==
Chandigarh–Kalka sector was electrified in 1999–2000.

== Loco sheds ==
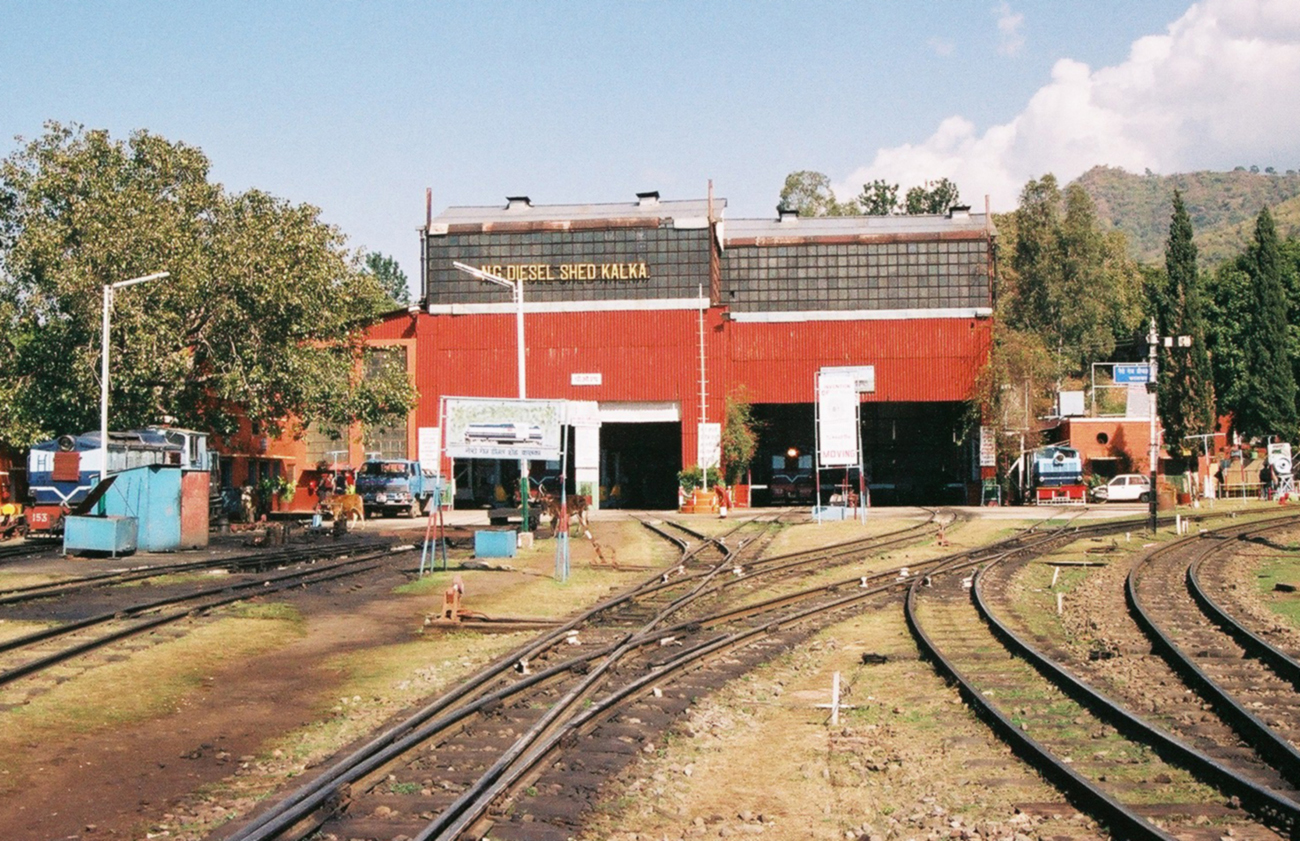
Kalka Diesel workshops

Kalka has a narrow gauge diesel shed for the maintenance of ZDM-3 and ZDM-5 narrow gauge diesel locos.

Diesel Loco Shed, Kalka (NG)
Serial No.	Locomotive Class	Horsepower	Holding
1.	ZDM-3	700	16
Total Locomotives Active as of May 2025			16

== Amenities ==
Kalka railway station has two double-bedded non-AC retiring rooms and a four-bedded dormitory. It has a computerized reservation office, vegetarian and non-vegetarian refreshment rooms and book stall.

== Kalka Mail ==
Kalka Mail (numbered 1 Up / 2 Dn) began operation in 1866 between Howrah and Delhi and then further extended from Delhi to Kalka in 1891. Both the terminal stations had internal carriageway for the cars of Viceroy and other high-ranking officers to reach next to their rail coach, The carriageway at Howrah is still used and runs between platforms 8 and 9, but the carriageway at Kalka has been converted into a platform.

Preceding station	Indian Railways	Following station
Terminus	Northern Railway zone Delhi–Kalka line	Chandi Mandir towards ?
Terminus	Northern Railway zone Kalka–Shimla Railway	Taksal towards ?
