= New Delhi–Kalka line =

Railway line in India

Delhi–Kalka line
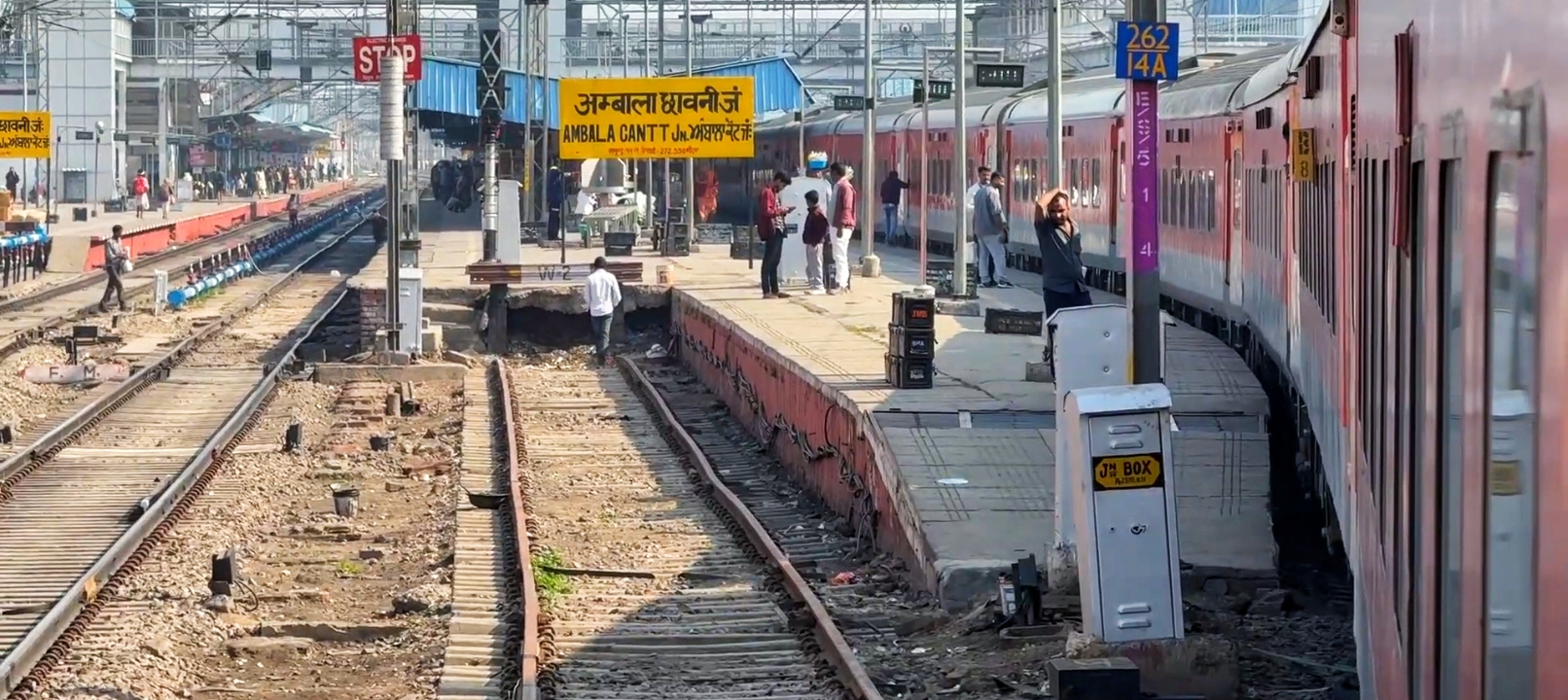
- Ambala Cantt. Junction is an important railway station on the Delhi–Kalka line

Overview
- Status: Operational
- Owner: Indian Railways
- Locale: Delhi, Haryana, Chandigarh
- Termini: Delhi; Kalka

Service
- Operator: Northern Railway

History
- Opened: 1889

Technical
- Track length: 264.71 km (164 mi)
- Track gauge: 5 ft 6 in (1,676 mm) Broad gauge
- Electrification: 25 kV 50 Hz AC OHE during 1992–2000
- Operating speed: 130 km/h (81 mph)

The Delhi–Kalka line is a railway line connecting Delhi and Kalka. It connects to the UNESCO World Heritage Site Kalka–Shimla Railway.

== History ==
The Delhi–Panipat–Ambala–Kalka line was opened in 1891.

The 2 ft (610 mm)-wide narrow-gauge Kalka–Shimla Railway was constructed by Delhi–Panipat–Ambala–Kalka Railway Company and opened for traffic in 1903. In 1905 the line was regauged to 2 ft 6 in (762 mm)-wide narrow gauge.

== Electrification ==
Sabjimandi (Delhi)–Panipat–Karnal sector was electrified in 1992–1995, Karnal–Kurukshetra sector in 1995–96, Kurukshetra–Ambala in 1996–98, Ambala–Chandigarh in 1998–99 and Chandigarh–Kalka in 1999–2000.

== Loco sheds ==
Ambala has a diesel loco shed for minor maintenance of WDS-4 shunters. The locos are sent to Shakurbasti for major maintenance or repairs. Kalka has a narrow-gauge diesel shed for the maintenance of ZDM-3 and ZDM-5 narrow-gauge diesel locos.

== Speed limits ==
The Delhi–Panipat–Ambala–Kalka line is classified as a ‘Group B’ line which can take speeds up to 130 km/h.

== Passenger movement ==
Delhi, Panipat, Ambala Cantonment and Chandigarh on this line are amongst the top hundred booking stations of Indian Railway.

== Railway reorganisation ==
In 1952, Eastern Railway, Northern Railway and North Eastern Railway were formed. Eastern Railway was formed with a portion of East Indian Railway Company, east of Mughalsarai and Bengal Nagpur Railway. Northern Railway was formed with a portion of East Indian Railway Company west of Mughalsarai, Jodhpur Railway, Bikaner Railway and Eastern Punjab Railway.
