= Chandigarh Junction railway station =

Railway station in Chandigarh, India

Chandigarh Junction
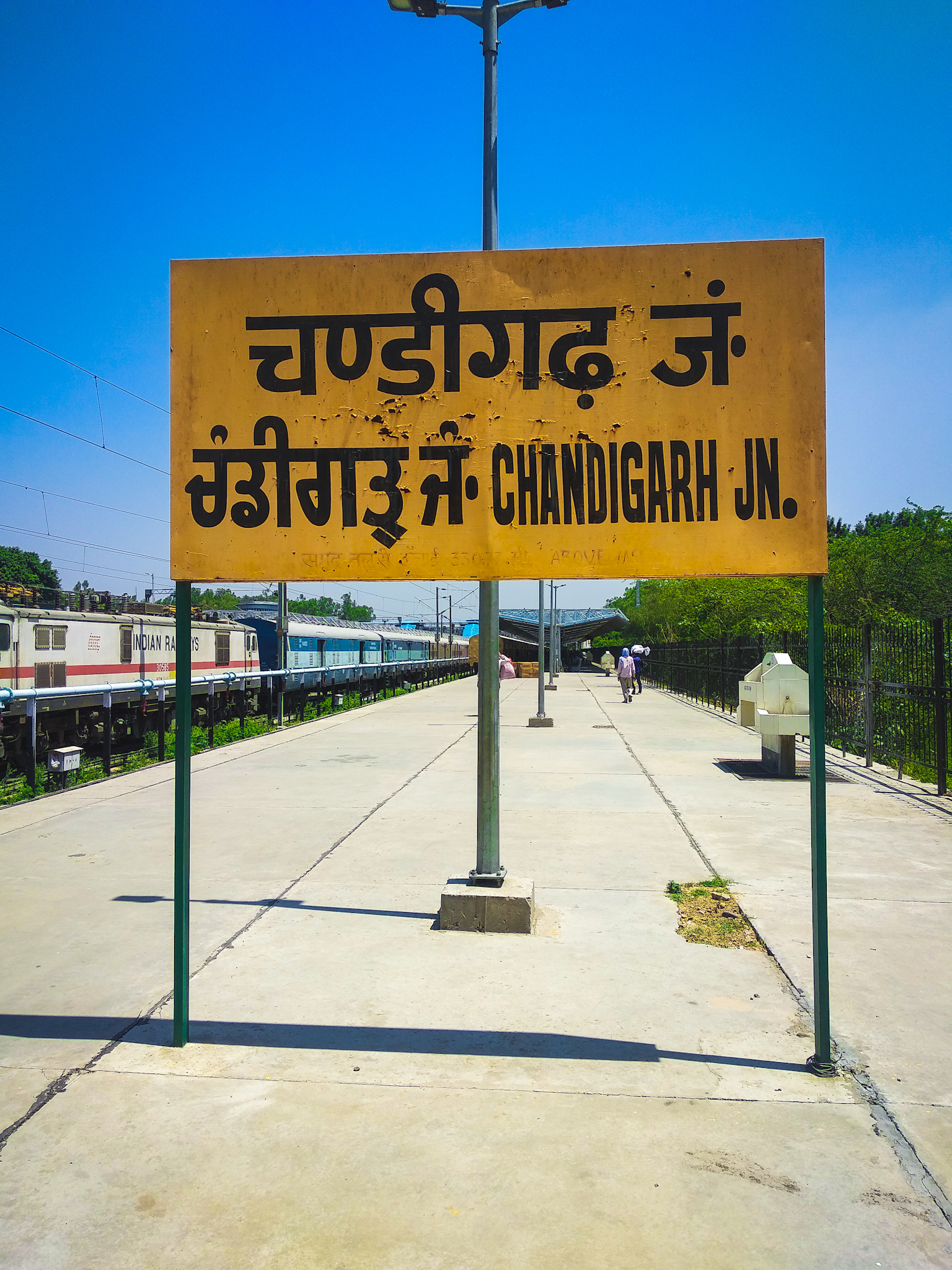
- Entrance to the Chandigarh station platform

General information
- Location: Industrial Area 1, Daria, Chandigarh; India
- Coordinates: 30°42′11″N 76°49′19″E
- Elevation: 330.77 metres (1,085.2 ft)
- System: Express train and Passenger train station
- Owner: Ministry of Railways (India)
- Operator: Indian Railways
- Lines: Delhi–Kalka line, Chandigarh–Sahnewal line
- Platforms: 6
- Tracks: 8 broad gauge 1,676 mm (5 ft 6 in)
- Connections: Auto stand, Taxi stand

Construction
- Structure type: At grade
- Parking: Yes
- Cycle facilities: No
- Accessible: Available

Other information
- Status: Functioning
- Station code: CDG
- Zone(s): Northern Railway
- Division(s): Ambala

History
- Opened: 1954; 72 years ago

Services
Preceding station	Indian Railways	Following station
Ghaggar towards Delhi Junction	Northern Railway zone Delhi–Kalka line	Chandi Mandir towards Kalka
Terminus	Northern Railway zone Chandigarh–Sahnewal line	SAS Nagar Mohali towards ?
Location
- Location within Chandigarh
- Interactive map

Chandigarh Junction railway station (station code: CDG), serves the union territory city of Chandigarh. The station is at an elevation of 330.77 metres (1,085.2 ft). It is 8 Kms from the City Centre of Chandigarh i.e. Sector 17.

== History ==
The Delhi–Panipat–Ambala–Kalka line was opened in 1891, and the Chandigarh–Sahnewal line (also referred to as Ludhiana–Chandigarh rail link) was inaugurated in 2013.

Ambala–Chandigarh sector was electrified in 1998–99 and Chandigarh–Kalka in 1999–2000.

== Amenities ==
Chandigarh railway station has computerized reservation facilities, General Railway Police outpost, telephone booths, tourist reception centre, waiting room, retiring room, vegetarian and non-vegetarian refreshment room, and book stall. In 2014, Chandigarh railway station got escalators.

The railway station is 8 km from the city centre. The airport is 7 km. City buses, auto rickshaws and cycle rickshaws are available at the station for local transportation.

== Redevelopment (2023–2026) ==
In January 2023, the Rail Land Development Authority (RLDA) commenced a comprehensive redevelopment of the Chandigarh Railway Station under the Amrit Bharat Station Scheme. Designated as a "Lighthouse Project," the ₹462 crore (US$55 million) initiative aims to transform the station into a multimodal transit hub. As of early 2026, the project reached approximately 90% completion, with full operational functionality expected by April 2026.

=== Technical Specifications and Infrastructure ===
The redevelopment utilizes a modular design strategy with prefabricated components to minimize disruption to rail operations. Key infrastructure includes:

- Station Buildings (G+3): Two identical, symmetrical station buildings have been constructed on both the Chandigarh and Panchkula sides. Each building is a Ground + 3 (G+3) structure measuring 60m x 42m, covering a built-up area of approximately 8,367 square meters each.
- Air Concourse: A central 72-meter wide and 80-meter long air concourse connects the second floors of both buildings. This elevated plaza serves as a segregated space for departing passengers, featuring retail outlets and food courts.
- Through Roof: A massive canopy spanning 180m x 80m (14,400+ sqm) covers the air concourse and foot overbridges, providing weather protection across all platforms.
- Vertical Circulation: The facility includes 30 lifts and 10 escalators to ensure barrier-free access.
- Foot Overbridges (FOBs): Two new 12-meter wide foot overbridges have been constructed at the Kalka and Ambala ends to streamline the flow of arriving passengers.

=== Passenger Amenities and Sustainability ===
The upgraded facility is designed to handle a projected daily footfall of over 100,000 passengers by 2061.

- Commercial Space: Over 4,000 square meters is dedicated to commercial use, including air-conditioned retiring rooms, paid lounges, and co-working spaces.
- Parking and Traffic: The parking area was expanded from 13,720 sqm to 24,515 sqm, featuring integrated traffic flow designs for auto-rickshaws, private cars, and buses.
- Sustainability: Solar panels with a total capacity of approximately 1,350 kWp have been installed on the platform roofs (Platforms 1 and 6).
