= Panipat Junction railway station =

Railway station in Haryana, India

Panipat Junction
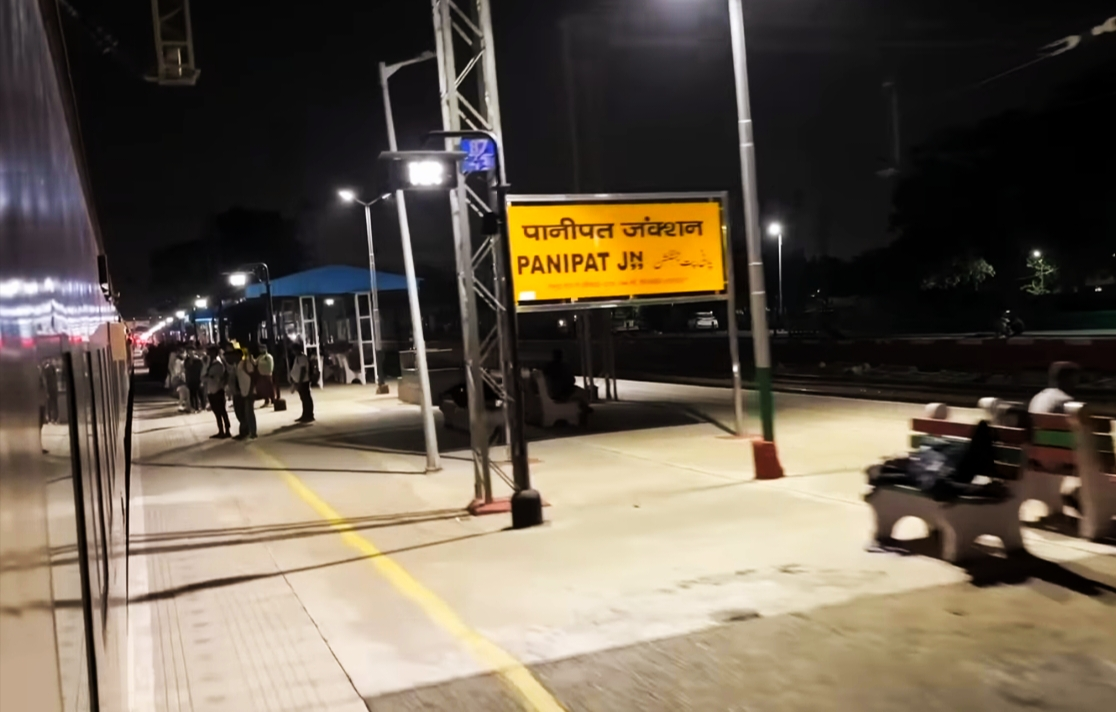
- Night View of Panipat Junction

General information
- Location: Railway Road, Geeta Colony, Panipat, Haryana; India
- Coordinates: 29°23′20″N 76°57′50″E
- Elevation: 235 metres (771 ft)
- System: Indian Railway and Delhi Suburban Railway station
- Owner: Ministry of Railways (India)
- Operator: Indian Railways
- Lines: Delhi–Kalka line, Panipat–Jind branch line, Panipat–Rohtak branch line
- Platforms: 5
- Tracks: 14 5 ft 6 in (1,676 mm) broad gauge

Construction
- Structure type: At grade
- Parking: Yes
- Cycle facilities: Yes

Other information
- Status: Functioning
- Station code: PNP
- Zone(s): Northern Railway
- Division(s): Delhi

History
- Opened: 1897

Passengers
- 40,000

Services
Preceding station	Indian Railways	Following station
Samalkha towards ?	Northern Railway zone Delhi–Kalka line	Babarpur towards ?
Terminus	Northern Railway zone Panipat–Jind branch line	Madlauda towards ?
Terminus	Northern Railway zone Panipat–Rohtak branch line	Binjhol towards ?
Location
- Location within Haryana

Panipat Junction Railway Station (station code: PNP) is located in Panipat district in the Indian state of Haryana and serves the historic and industrial town of Panipat.

== History ==
The Delhi–Panipat–Ambala–Kalka line was opened in 1891.

Sabjimandi–Sonipat–Panipat–Karnal sector was electrified in 1992–1995.

Panipat–Jind line and Panipat–Rohtak line were electrified in 2018–19.

== The railway station ==
Panipat junction railway station is a major junction in Delhi-NCR. In Panipat 118 trains halt here with 40,000 person travels daily. It is an A grade category station. It has 5 platforms for trains. It has major facilities available like many ticket counters, automatic ticket machine, fully computerized ticket reservation, automatic water machine, AC waiting hall, well shed sheltered, washroom, foot overbridge, water facility, book stall, lift, wi-fi connectivity, food stalls, bicycle stand, auto stand, car stand, CCTV camera, mall yard, washing line and other facilities. Major trains stops for Shatabdi, Jan Shatabdi, Sampark Kranti, Garib Rath, AC Express, Superfast, Mail-Express, Intercity, Ladies Special EMU and other Passenger trains. It is at an elevation of 235 metres (771 ft) and was assigned the code – PNP.

Panipat Junction has been selected for upgrading under the "400 Stations" development project.

== Existing rail lines ==
Delhi–Kalka line, Delhi–Amritsar line, Delhi–Jammu line, Panipat–Jind line, Panipat–Rohtak line connected and upcoming purposed Panipat–Meerut line via Muzaffarnagar, Panipat–Haridwar line, Panipat-Rewari double line, via Asthal Bohar, Jhajjar or Bypass by the Rohtak Junction Panipat-Assoti Double line via Farukh Nagar, Patli, Manesar, Palwal.

== Construction projects for new rail lines ==
Delhi–Chandigarh–Amritsar high-speed rail corridor, 459 km corridor costing 1 lakh crore, has bene approved by the railway board and construction will commence in year 2028. The route will pass through Delhi–Panipat–Ambala–Chandigarh–Ludhiana–Jalandhar–Amritsar

National Capital Region Transport Corporation approved Delhi–Panipat RRTS. Construction work will start in year 2023. Cost of this corridor around 21,627 crore. At four major stops in Panipat: Panipat Depot, Panipat North, Panipat South and Samalkha.

Panipat–Meerut rail line, costing Rs 3540 crore, construction work will commence in year 2023.

Delhi–Chandigarh semi-high-speed rail corridor with 200 km/h via Ambala Cantt and Panipat will commence construction work in 2023. Cost of this corridor 11,218 crore.

== See also ==
- Railway in Haryana
- Highways in Haryana
