= Howrah–New Delhi Duronto Express =

Train in India

Howrah Junction – New Delhi Duronto Express
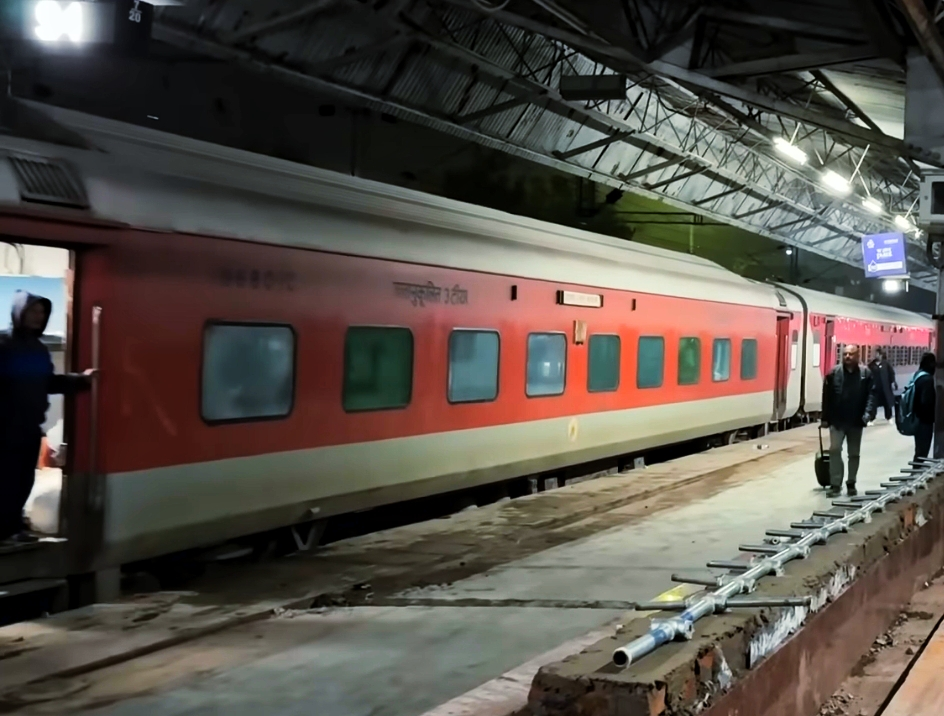
- Howrah-New Delhi Duronto Express Arrived At Prayagraj Junction railway station

Overview
- Service type: Duronto Express
- Status: Operating
- Locale: West Bengal, Jharkhand, Bihar, Uttar Pradesh and Delhi
- First service: 2 April 2010; 15 years ago
- Current operator: Eastern Railway zone

Route
- Termini: Howrah (HWH), West Bengal; New Delhi (NDLS), Delhi
- Stops: 7
- Distance travelled: 1,531 kilometres (951 mi)
- Average journey time: 22 hrs
- Service frequency: Twice a week: 12273 – Mondays and Fridays; 12274 – Tuesdays and Saturdays
- Train number: 12273/12274

On-board services
- Classes: First AC, Second AC, Third AC, Sleeper
- Seating arrangements: Available
- Sleeping arrangements: Available
- Catering facilities: Available
- Observation facilities: LHB coach
- Baggage facilities: Available

Technical
- Rolling stock: LHB coach
- Track gauge: 1,676 mm (5 ft 6 in)
- Electrification: 25 kV AC 50 Hz
- Operating speed: Average – 70 km/h Maximum – 130 km/h

The Howrah–New Delhi–Howrah Duronto Express is a Duronto class train which operates between the capital of West Bengal, Kolkata and the national capital New Delhi. It is the second Duronto Express connecting Delhi to Kolkata, the other one being the Sealdah–Bikaner Duronto Express. Most of the other Duronto trains take less travel time than their Rajdhani counterparts. Therefore, before the introduction of the Howrah Duronto, it was expected to be the fastest service on the route by many Indian railfans. The Rajdhani Express gets top-most priority on the route, making it the fastest train in the Howrah–Delhi route. But, the Rajdhani continues to be the fastest as both trains cover the same distance and despite being a non-stop service, with no commercial halts, the Duronto takes more time than the Rajdhani. It has been running with modern LHB rakes since 2 July 2021, having a maximum permissible speed of 130 km/h, thus replacing the hybrid LHB Rakes which have a maximum permissible speed of 120 km/h.

== Change in route ==
Beginning 6 February 2018, the route of this train was changed from Grand Chord (via Dhanbad) to mainline (via Patna) on request of Godda MP Nishikant Dubey. Therefore, it now travels 1,531 km rather than 1,451 km. Due to this it takes more time than the Premium Rajdhanis and Sealdah Duronto Express from Kolkata to Delhi. Therefore, its average speed went down from 84 km/h to 70 km/h.

== Locomotive ==
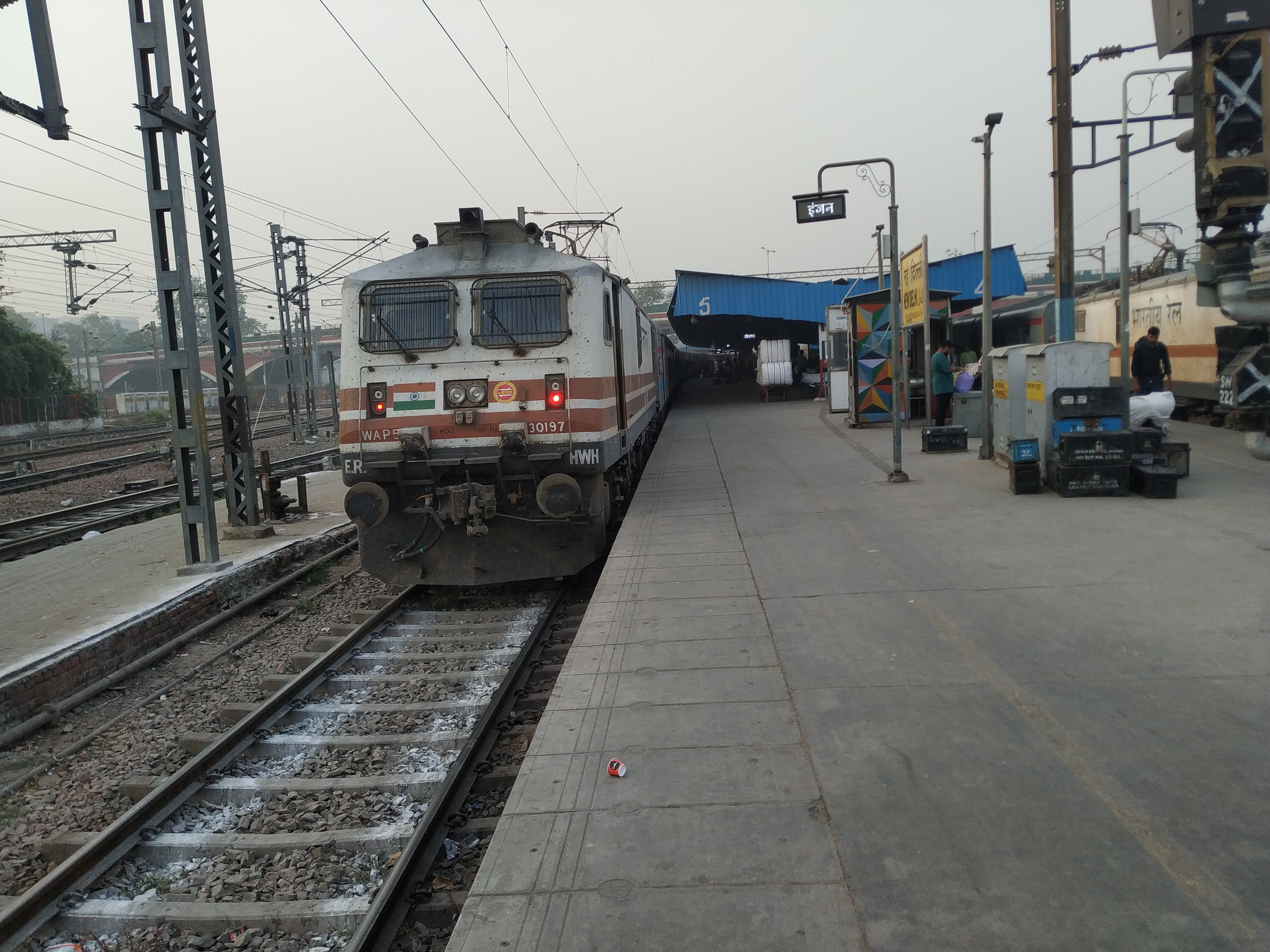
12273 Duronto Express led by WAP 5 standing on Platform 5 in New Delhi

It is hauled by a Howrah-based WAP-7 end to end.

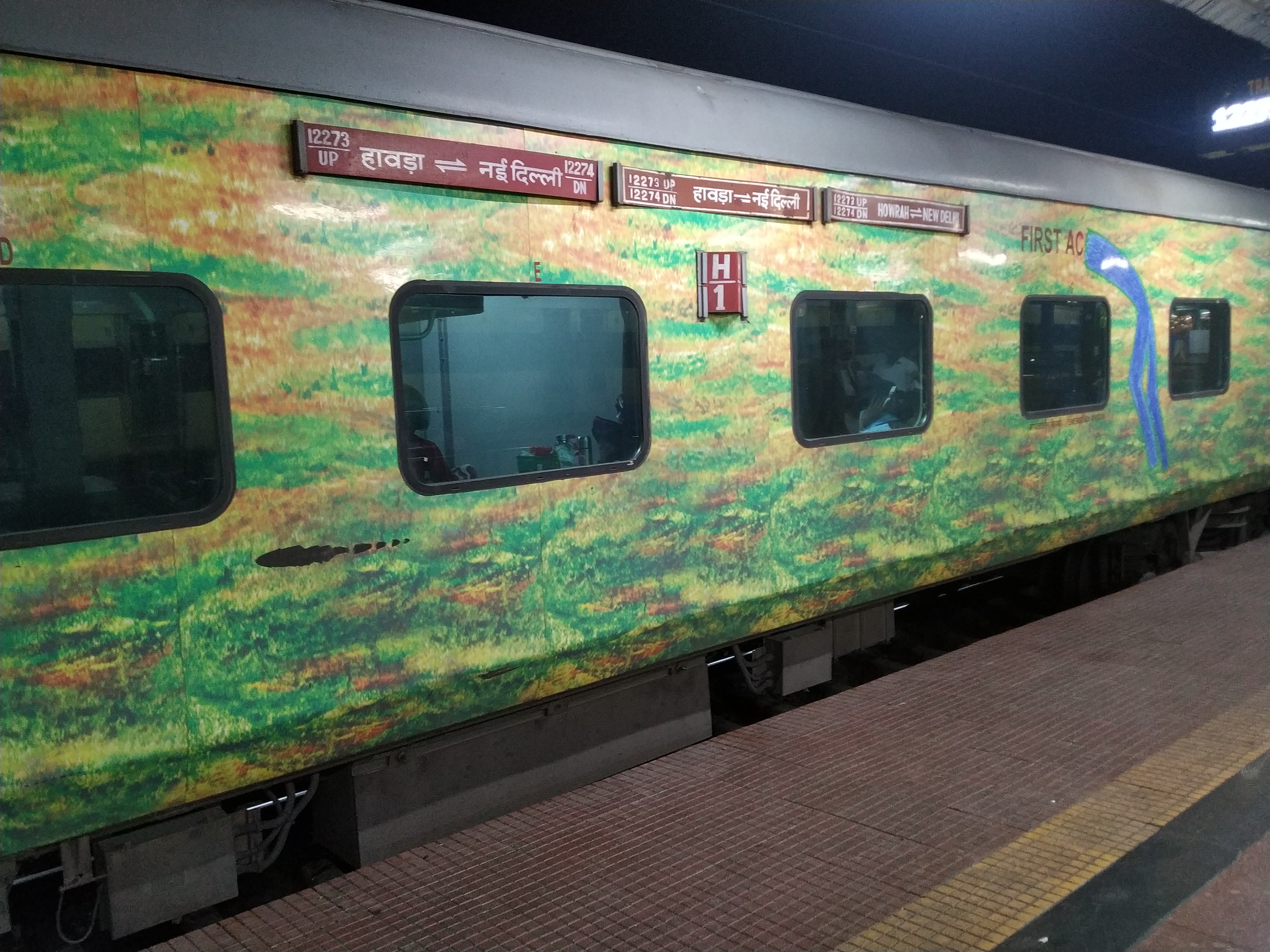
Howrah-New Delhi Duronto Express on Platform 6 of Mughalsarai Junction

== Route and halts ==
• Howrah Junction

• Asansol Junction

• Jasidih Junction

• Patna Junction

• Pandit Deen Dayal Upadhyaya Junction

• Kanpur Central

• New Delhi

== Coach composition ==
This train uses LHB coaches.Coach Composition for this train is:

8 Sleeper coach

1 Pantry Car

7 AC 3 Tier

1 AC 3 Tier economy

2 AC 2 tier coach

1 AC 1 Tier coach

== Coach positioning ==
Coach Positioning of this train at Howarh Junction is:

LOCO-SLR-S1-S2-S3-S4-S5-S6-S7-S8-PC-H1-A1-A2-B1-B2-B3-B4-B5-B6-B7-M1-EOG

Vice Versa Coach positioning at New Delhi Railway station.

== Speed ==
The maximum permissible speed of the train is up to 130 km/h except some parts. Its all coaches are of air conditioned LHB coach type which is capable of reaching 160 km/h but it does not touch. Sometimes people become confused because according to Indian Railways Permanent Way Manual (IRPWM) on Indian Railways website or Indian Railway Institute of Civil Engineering website, the BG (Broad Gauge) lines have been classified into six groups ‘A’ to ‘E’ on the basis of the future maximum permissible speeds but it may not be same as present speed.

The maximum permissible speed is 130 km/h except two small parts – 29 km long New Delhi (NDLS) – Chipyana Buzurg (CPYZ) part where Railway is trying to raise maximum permissible sectional speed to 130 km/h from 110 km/h and Jhajha – Madhupur part where trains pass through at a maximum permissible speed of 110 km/h. The trains also touch the speed of 100 km/h in a short stretch of approximately for this short distance.

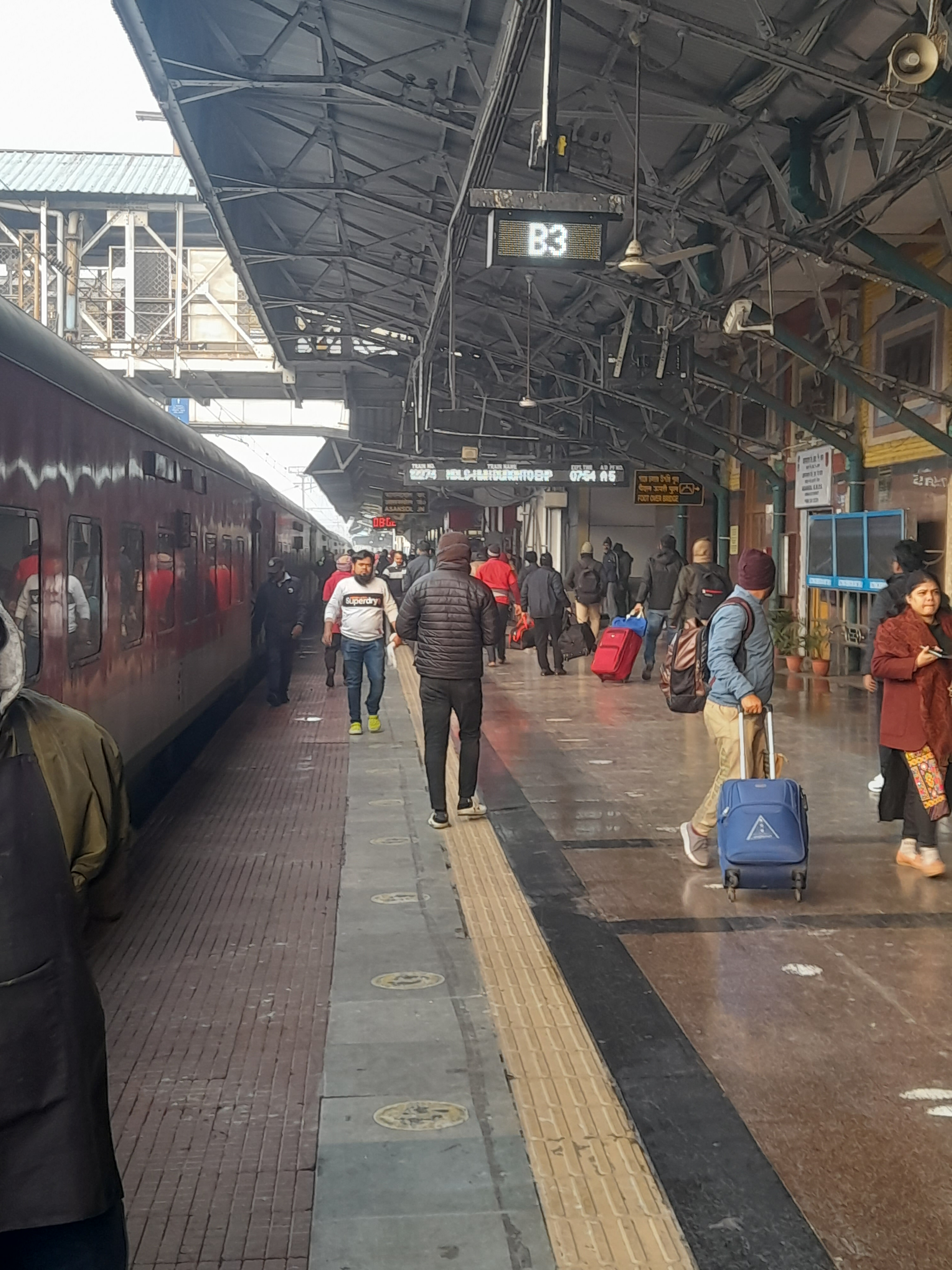
An Air Conditioned 3 Tier coach (numbered B3) of 12274 New Delhi - Howrah Duronto Express standing at Asansol Junction

Railway Board has approved the speed policy which envisages operation of passenger trains at 160 km/h on Delhi–Howrah route but it is still unclear what will its impact on this train in future like increasing of speed but not up to 160 km/h or up to 160 km/h.

== Other trains ==
Other trains for Kolkata to Delhi travel and vice versa are :-

1. Howrah–Barmer Express
2. Netaji Express
3. Poorva Express (via Gaya)
4. Poorva Express (via Patna)
5. West Bengal Sampark Kranti Express
6. Howrah–New Delhi Rajdhani Express (via Gaya)
7. Howrah–New Delhi Rajdhani Express (via Patna)
8. Sealdah-Bikaner Duronto Express
9. Sealdah Rajdhani Express
10. Howrah-New Delhi Duronto Express
11. Jallianwalla Bagh Express
12. Bikaner Howrah Weekly Superfast Express (via Lucknow)
13. Santragachi–Anand Vihar Superfast Express
