= Indian locomotive class WAP-3 =

Indian Railway passenger class electric locomotive

WAP-3
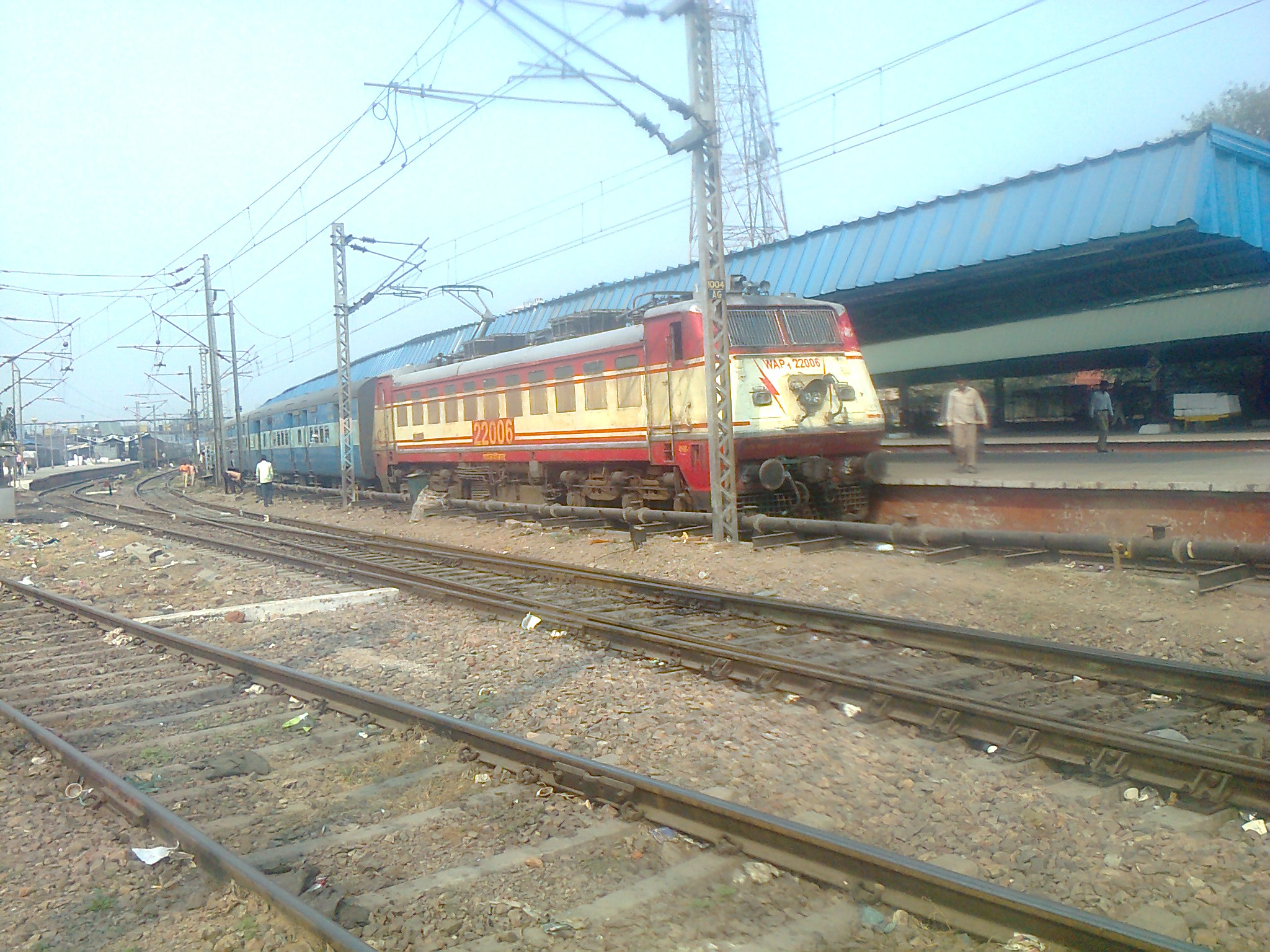
- WAP-1 22006
Type and origin
- Power type: Electric
- Designer: RDSO, Chittaranjan Locomotive Works
- Builder: Chittaranjan Locomotive Works
- Order number: RDSOE-17
- Model: WAP-1 FMII
- Build date: 1987–1988
- Total produced: 9 (all from previous WAP-1 units)
- Rebuilder: Chittaranjan Locomotive Works
- Rebuild date: 1987–1988
- Number rebuilt: 9
Specifications
- Configuration
  - AAR: C-C
  - UIC: Co′Co′
  - Commonwealth: Co-Co
- Gauge: 5 ft 6 in (1,676 mm)
- Bogies: Fabricated bogie assembly (Flexicoil Mark II and later Mark IV)
- Wheel diameter: New: 1,092 mm (3 ft 7 in); Half worn: 1,055 mm (3 ft 5 1/2 in); Full worn: 1,016 mm (3 ft 4 in)
- Wheelbase: 1,735 mm (5 ft 8 in)
- Length
  - Over beams: 18.794 m (61 ft 7 29/32 in)
  - Over body: 17.500 m (57 ft 4 31/32 in)
- Width: 3.179 m (10 ft 5 5/32 in)
- Height: 4.272 m (14 ft 3/16 in)
- Frame type: Flexicoil (cast steel bogies); primary and secondary wheel springs with bolsters
- Axle load: 18,800 kg (41,400 lb)
- Loco weight: 112,000 kg (247,000 lb)
- Sandbox cap.: 8 Sandboxes
- Power supply: 110v DC
- Electric system/s: 25 kV 50 Hz AC Overhead
- Current pickup: Pantograph
- Traction motors: Alstom TAO 659
- Loco brake: Air
- Train brakes: Air, Dual
- Safety systems: Slip control, Over voltage relay, Main overload relay, Earth Fault Relay, Low Pressure Governor, Brake Cylinder Cutoff Valve, Train parting alarms and No OHE volt relay
Performance figures
- Maximum speed: 130 km/h (81 mph)
- Power output
  - Starting: 3,900 hp (2,900 kW)
  - Continuous: 3,760 hp (2,804 kW)
- Tractive effort
  - Starting: 22,400 kgf (220 kN)
  - 1 hour: 22,400 kgf (220 kN)
Career
- Operators: Indian Railways
- Class: WAP-3
- Numbers: 22003, 22005-22009 and 22034, 22051, 22052
- Nicknames: Jawahar
- Locale: All over India
- Delivered: 1987
- First run: 1988
- Withdrawn: February 2017
- Preserved: 1 (as Loco pilot trainer)
- Disposition: All reverted to WAP-1 and in service.

The Indian locomotive class WAP-3 was a class of 25 kV AC electric locomotives that was designed by Research Design and Standards Organisation (RDSO) and Chittaranjan Locomotive Works (CLW) for Indian Railways in 1987. The model name stands for Broad gauge (W), AC Current (A), Passenger traffic (P) locomotive, 3rd generation (3). They entered service in 1988. They were the faster variant of the previous WAP-1 class. A total of 9 WAP-3 were converted from existing WAP-1 units at CLW between 1987 and 1988, but were later reverted back to WAP-1 specifications.

== History ==
The history of the WAP-3 begins in the early 1980s with the WAP-1 class. The WAP-1 was the first attempt to create a dedicated high-speed electric passenger locomotive. They were first used on the Howrah Rajdhani Express, but Indian Railways was not satisfied with the performance of the WAP-1, as they could haul around 19 coaches at a max speed of 120 km/h. So Indian Railways decided to procure a faster version of the WAP-1.

The WAP-3 was ordered from CLW to the design of RDSO. The Flexicoil cast steel bogies of the WAP-1 was replaced by Flexicoil Mark II versions. This increased max speed to 140 km/h. Five prototype locomotives of this type were made from existing WAP-1 units. The first prototype WAP-1 numbered '22005 Jawahar' was put into service in 1988. Initially these locomotives were classified as WAP-1 FM II, with FM II standing for " Flexicoil Mark II " and were certified to run at 130 km/h between Jhansi and lalitpur section. Later Flexicoil Mark 4 bogies were provided for Subsequent WAP-3 which increased max speed to 160 km/h.

They were first used on the Taj Express and then the Shatabdi express. The Bhopal Shatabdi used to run with WAP-3 for some time. But as trains got longer the WAP-3 struggled to perform and required banking locomotives on moderately graded sections, and so did not meet their design goals these were reverted to WAP-1 class again.

The WAP-3 and WAP-1 provided the basis for the WAP-4 class.

== Locomotive sheds ==
As of June 2026, the status of the former WAP-3 class locomotives is as follows:

Loco No	Current/Final Shed	Status	Current class	Comment	REF
22003	Electric Loco Shed, Arakkonam (AJJ)	Training Loco	WAP-1	Converted to training loco with glass panels in bodyside	
22005	Diesel Loco Shed, Erode (EDDX)	Scrapped	WAP-1	Named Jawahar	
22006	Diesel Loco Shed, Lucknow (AMVD)	Withdrawn	WAP-1	Named Rajhans	
22007	Diesel Loco Shed, Erode (EDDX)	Scrapped	WAP-1		
22008	Diesel Loco Shed, Erode (EDDX)	Scrapped	WAP-1		
22009	Diesel Loco Shed, Erode (EDDX)	Scrapped	WAP-1		
22034	Diesel Loco Shed, Lucknow (AMVD)	In service	WAP-1		
22051	Diesel Loco Shed, Samastipur (SPJD)	In service	WAP-4		
22052	Diesel Loco Shed, Izzatnagar (IZN)	In service	WAP-1		

== See also ==
- Rail transport in India § History
- Locomotives of India
- Rail transport in India
