= Indian locomotive class WAP-1 =

Indian Railway passenger class electric locomotive

WAP-1
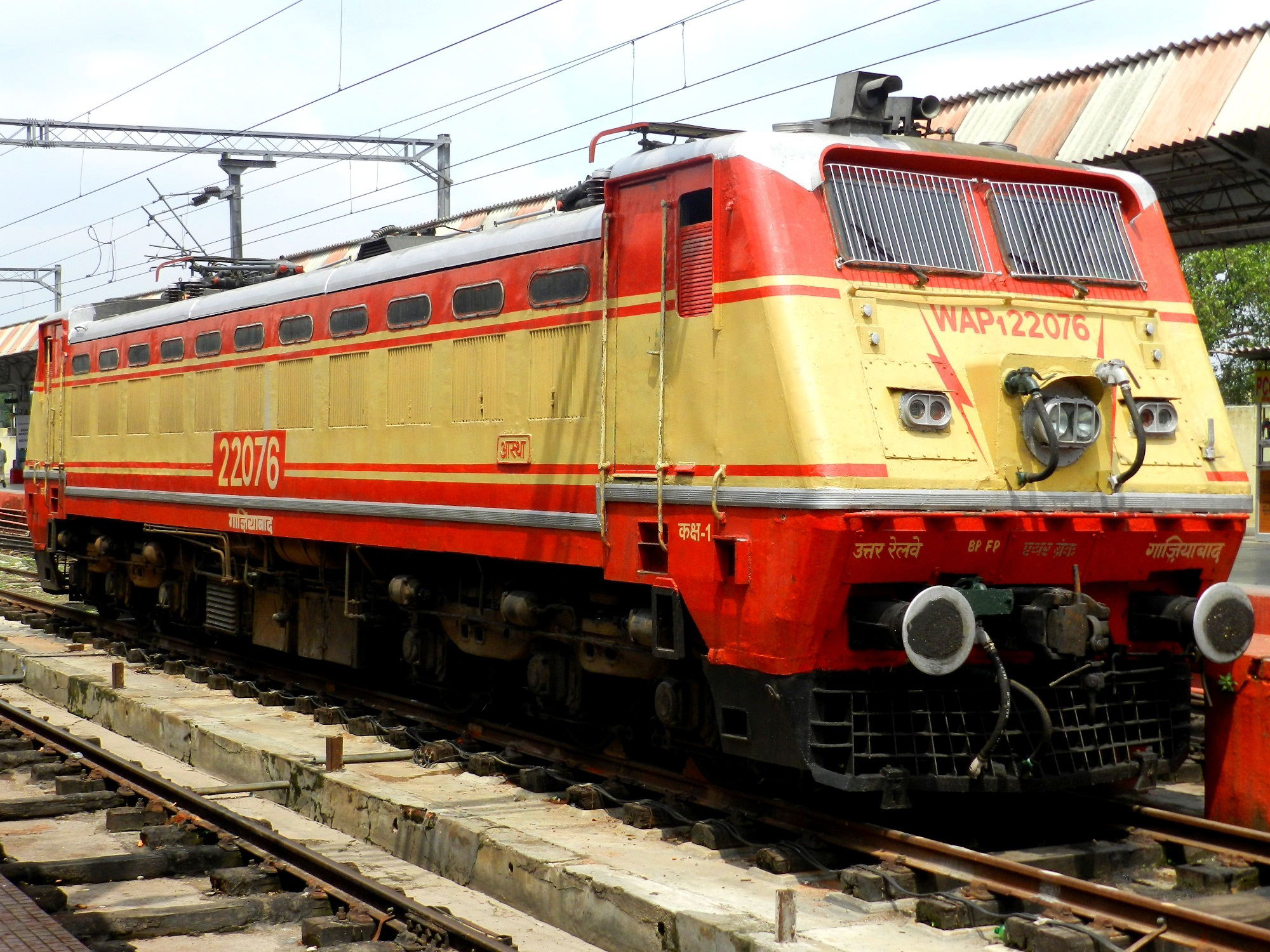
- WAP-1 at Lucknow Junction.
Type and origin
- Power type: Electric
- Builder: Chittaranjan Locomotive Works, West Bengal, India
- Build date: 1980–1996
- Total produced: WAP-1: 65
Specifications
- Configuration
  - AAR: C-C
  - UIC: Co′Co′
- Gauge: 1,676 mm (5 ft 6 in)
- Bogies: Flexicoil (cast steel bogies); primary and secondary wheel springs with bolsters
- Wheel diameter: New: 1,092 mm (3 ft 7 in); Half worn: 1,055 mm (3 ft 5 1/2 in); Full worn: 1,016 mm (3 ft 4 in)
- Length: 18.794 m (61 ft 7 29/32 in)
- Width: 3.179 m (10 ft 5 5/32 in)
- Height: 4.272 m (14 ft 3/16 in)
- Axle load: 18,800 kg (41,400 lb)
- Loco weight: 112,000 kg (247,000 lb)
- Electric system/s: 25 kV 50 Hz AC Overhead
- Current pickup: Pantograph
- Traction motors: Alstom/CLW TAO 659
- Loco brake: Air
- Train brakes: Air, Dual
- Safety systems: Slip control, over-voltage relay, main overload relay, earth-fault relay, low-pressure governor, brake cylinder cutoff valve, train parting alarms and No OHE volt relay
Performance figures
- Maximum speed: 130 km/h (81 mph)
- Power output
  - Continuous: 3,800 hp (2,834 kW)
- Tractive effort
  - Starting: 22,400 kgf (220 kN; 49,000 lbf)
Career
- Operators: Indian Railways
- Numbers: 22000–22076, many being converted to WAP-4
- Locale: All over India
- Preserved: One (22004)
- Disposition: Active

The Indian locomotive class WAP-1 is a class of 25 kV AC electric locomotives that was developed in 1980 by Chittaranjan Locomotive Works for Indian Railways. The model name stands for broad gauge (W), AC Current (A), Passenger traffic (P) locomotive, 1st generation (1). They entered service in late 1981. A total of 65 WAP-1 were built at CLW between 1980 and 1996, which made them the most numerous class of mainline electric passenger locomotive until its successor, the WAP-4.

The WAP-1 was the first dedicated AC electric passenger locomotive of Indian Railways, and also the first dedicated passenger locomotive built in India since its independence in 1947. It has provided the basic design for a number of other locomotives like WAP-3 and WAP-4 models. However, with the advent of new 3-phase locomotives like WAP-5 and WAP-7, the WAP-1 locomotives were relegated to hauling smaller express and passenger trains and now the aging fleet the WAP-1 locomotives are being slowly withdrawn from mainline duties and scrapped.

== Development ==
=== Background ===
In the early 1980s, Indian Railways began considering developing a passenger version of its WAM-4 class. Designed for both passenger and goods trains the WAM-4 was one of the most successful locomotives of the 1970s and a mainstay of the Indian Railways.

Five prototype locomotives of this type were ordered from CLW to the design of RDSO. The first prototype locomotive was put into service in 1981. They were first used on the Howrah Rajdhani Express.

The locomotive is powered by six axle-hungs, nose-suspended forced ventilated type DC traction motors. Speed control is achieved by grouping in 2S-3P combination and by field weakening of the motor. It utilises a silicon rectifier for conversion of AC power into DC. (Note: The Great Indian Peninsula Railway EA/1 class of 1928 may disagree.)

They are being converted to make them suitable for multiple operations. Compressed air brakes for the locomotives and vacuum brakes for the train are provided. The brake system is being modified to make them suitable for dual brakes.

The WAP-1 provided the basis for the WAP-4.

== Variants ==
The WAP-3 was the upgraded variant of the WAP-1 with a higher top speed of 140 km/h. All units of this class were WAP-1 units already in service. The first locomotive converted was a WAP-1 22005 Jawahar. Subsequently 8 more WAP-1 were converted, but since the class were not a great success and had performance issues, these were converted back to WAP-1 in 1997.

== Preservation ==
One WAP-1 locomotive, 22004, has been preserved at Arakkonam shed.

== Image gallery ==
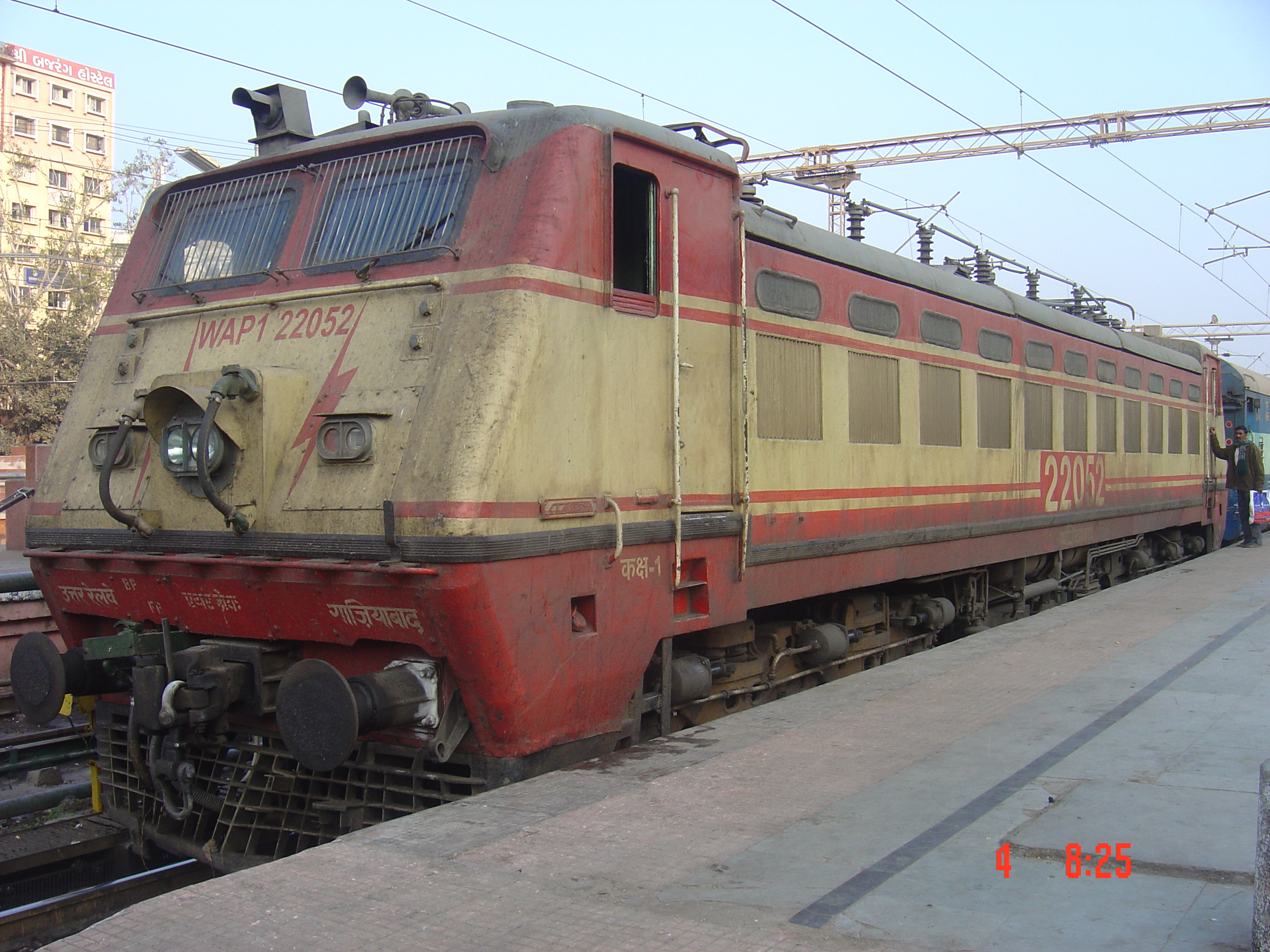
2925 Paschim Express with a WAP-1

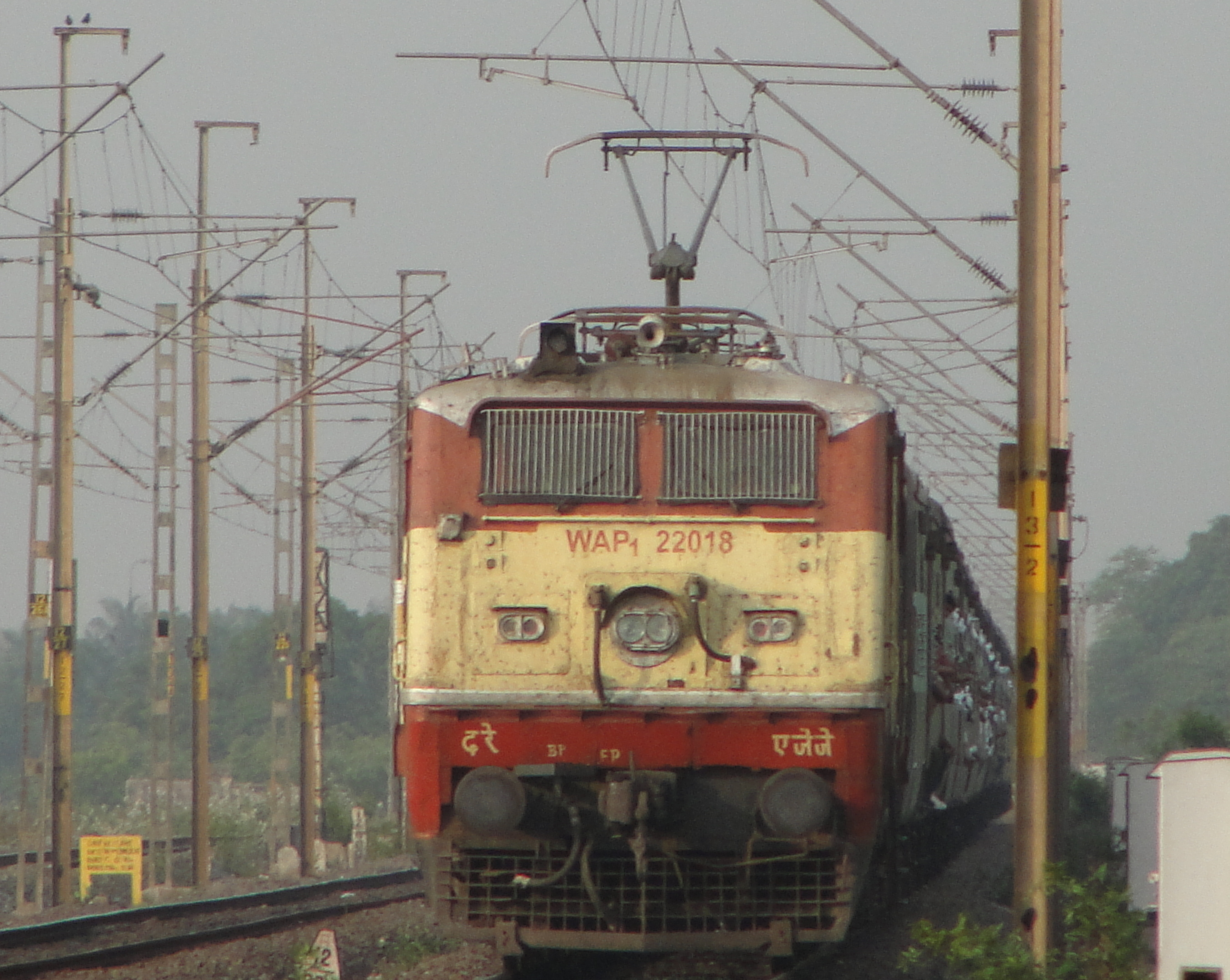
WAP-1

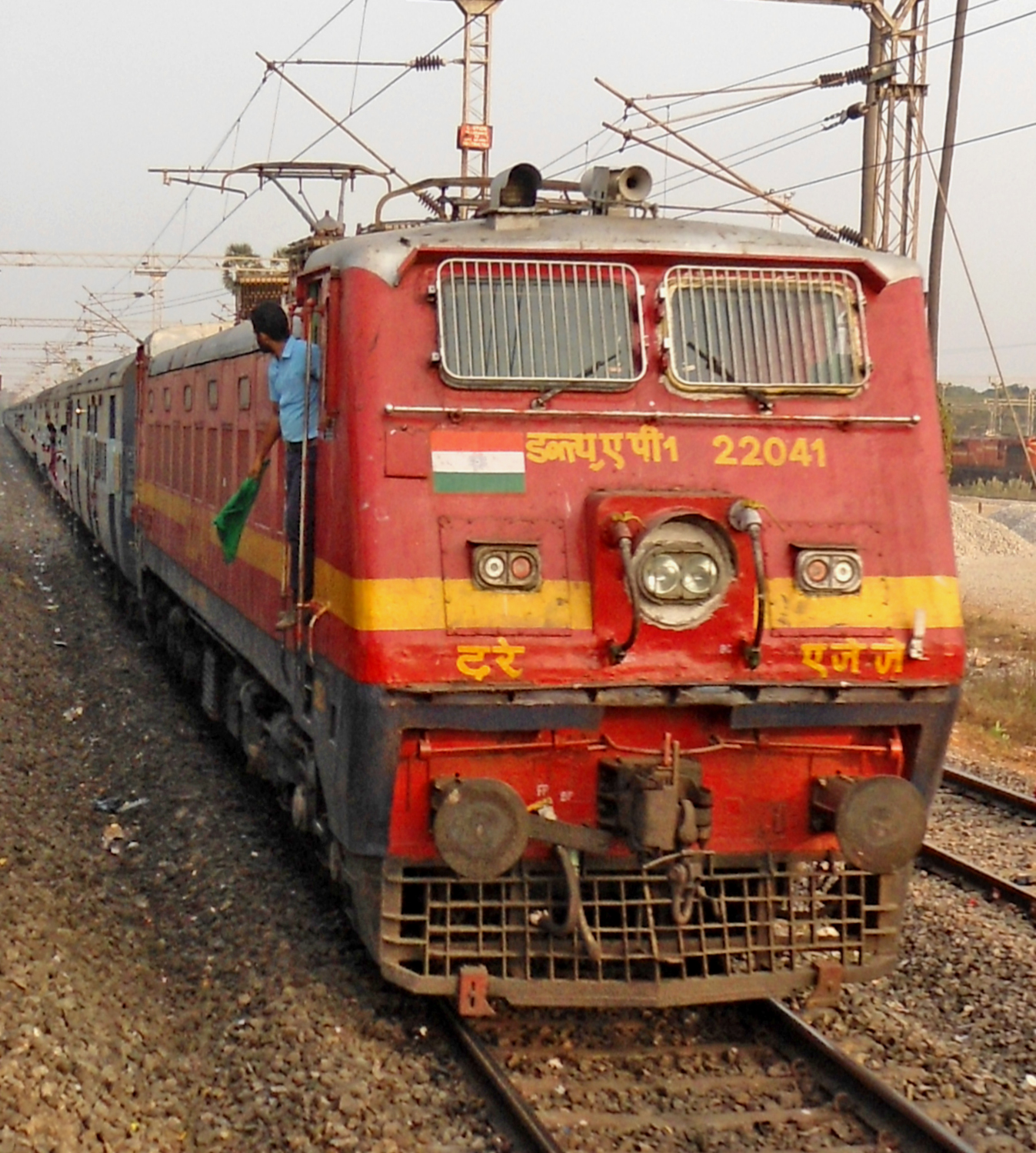
AJJ WAP-1 with WAP-4 livery hauls Trivandrum-bound Guwahati Express

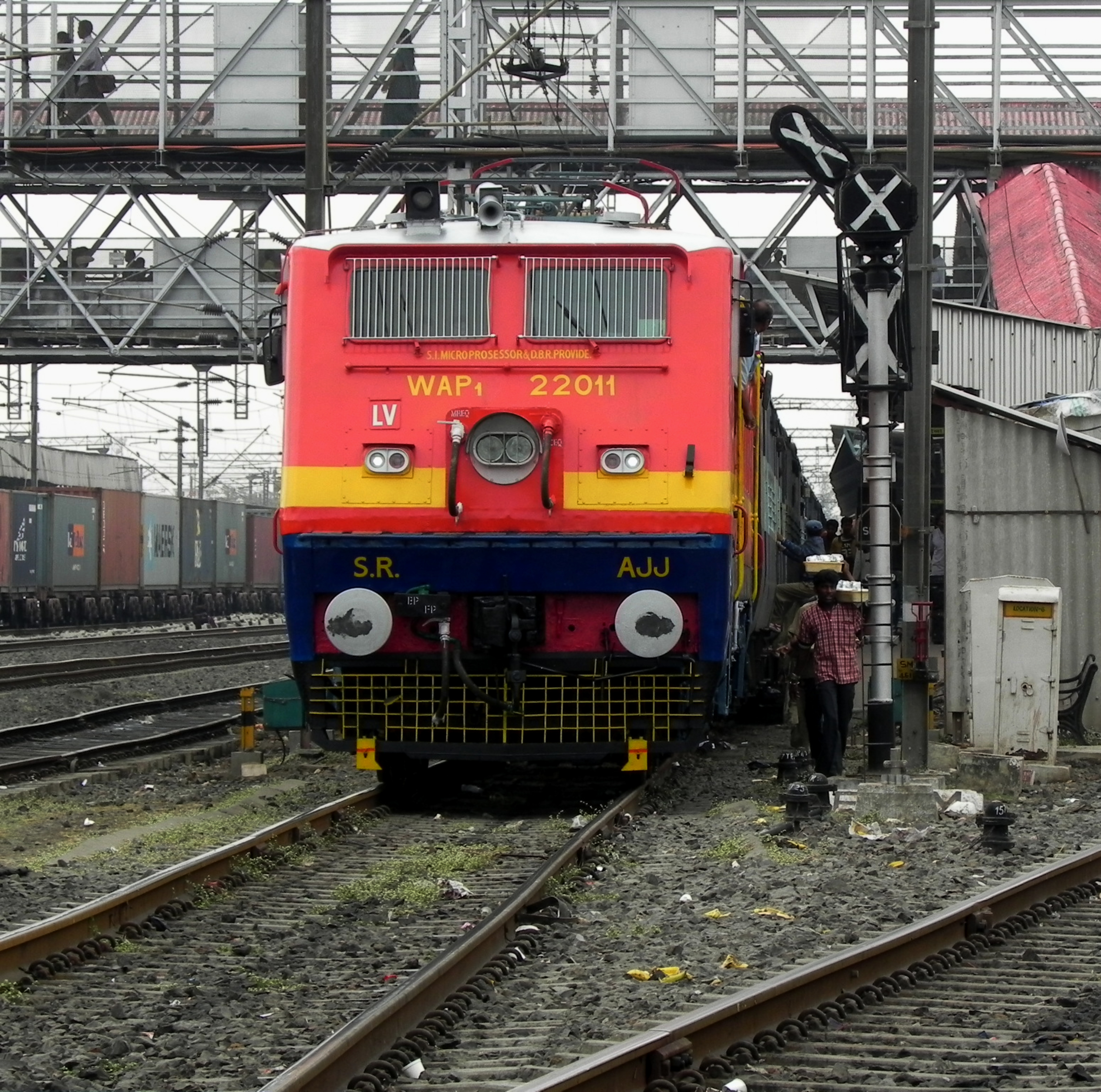
AJJ WAP-1 in full WAP-4 livery.

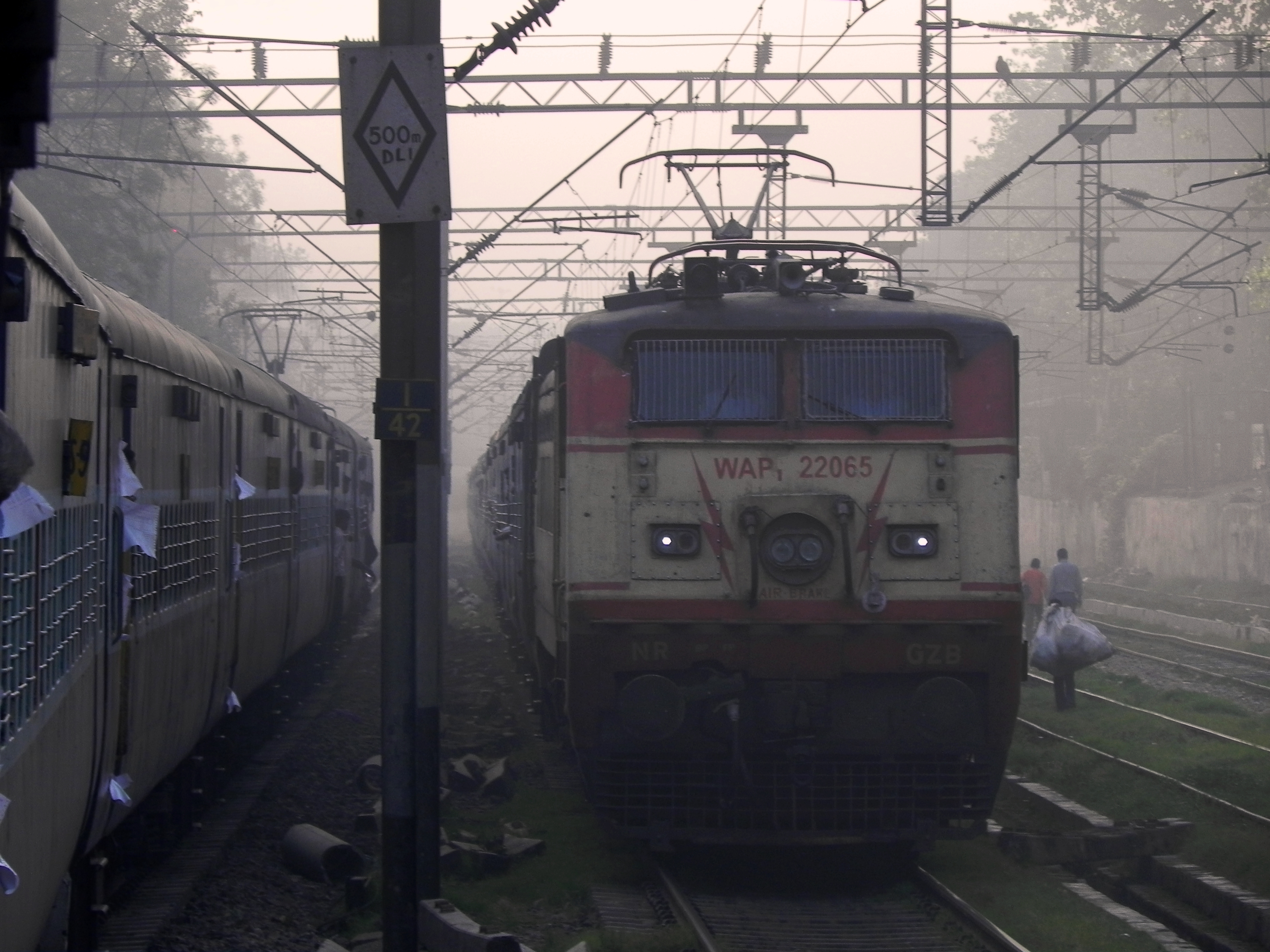
12497 (NDLS-ASR) Shaan-e-Punjab Express with a WAP-1

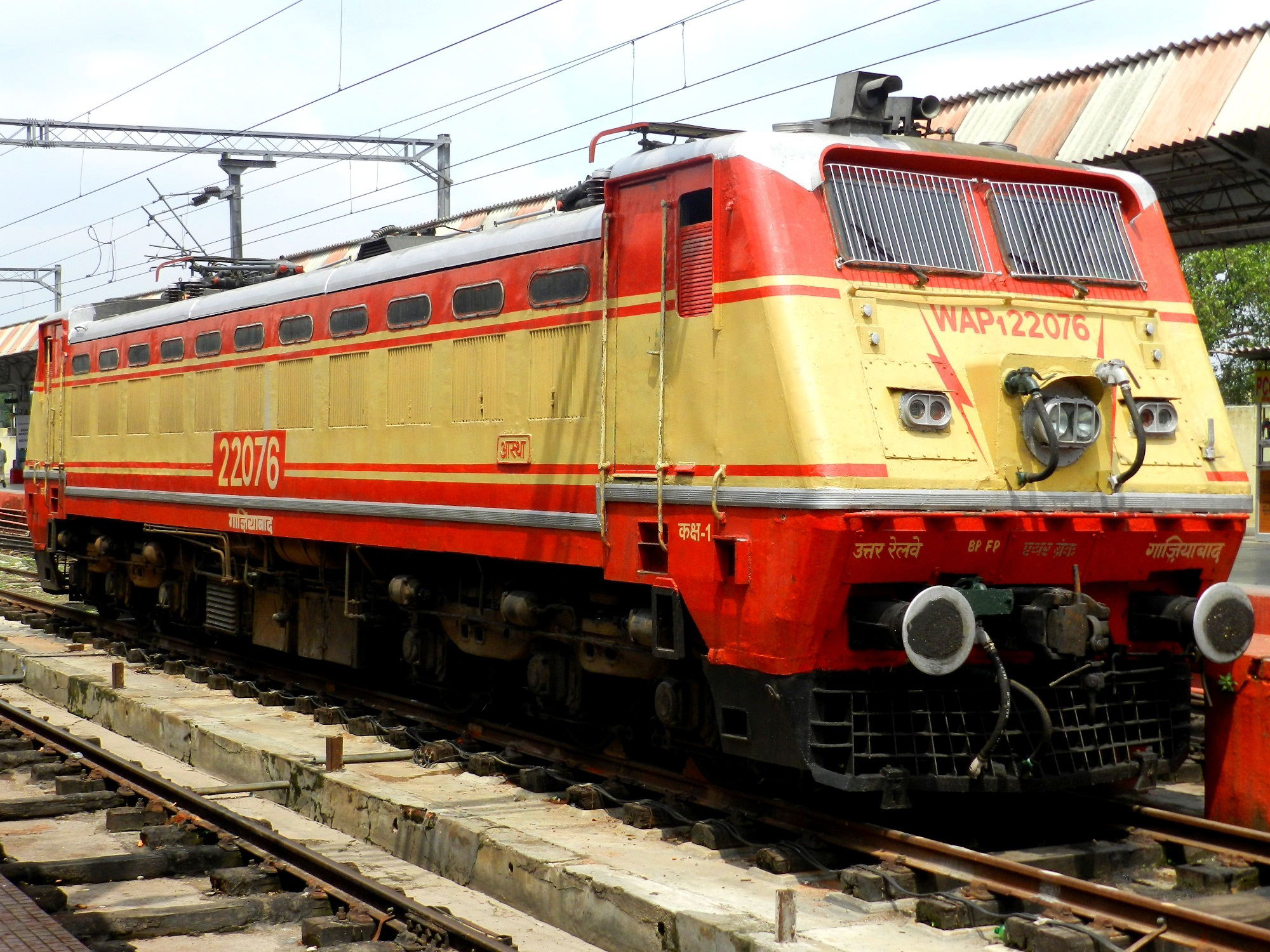
WAP-1 22076 Aastha of GZB with Agra-bound ICE at LJN

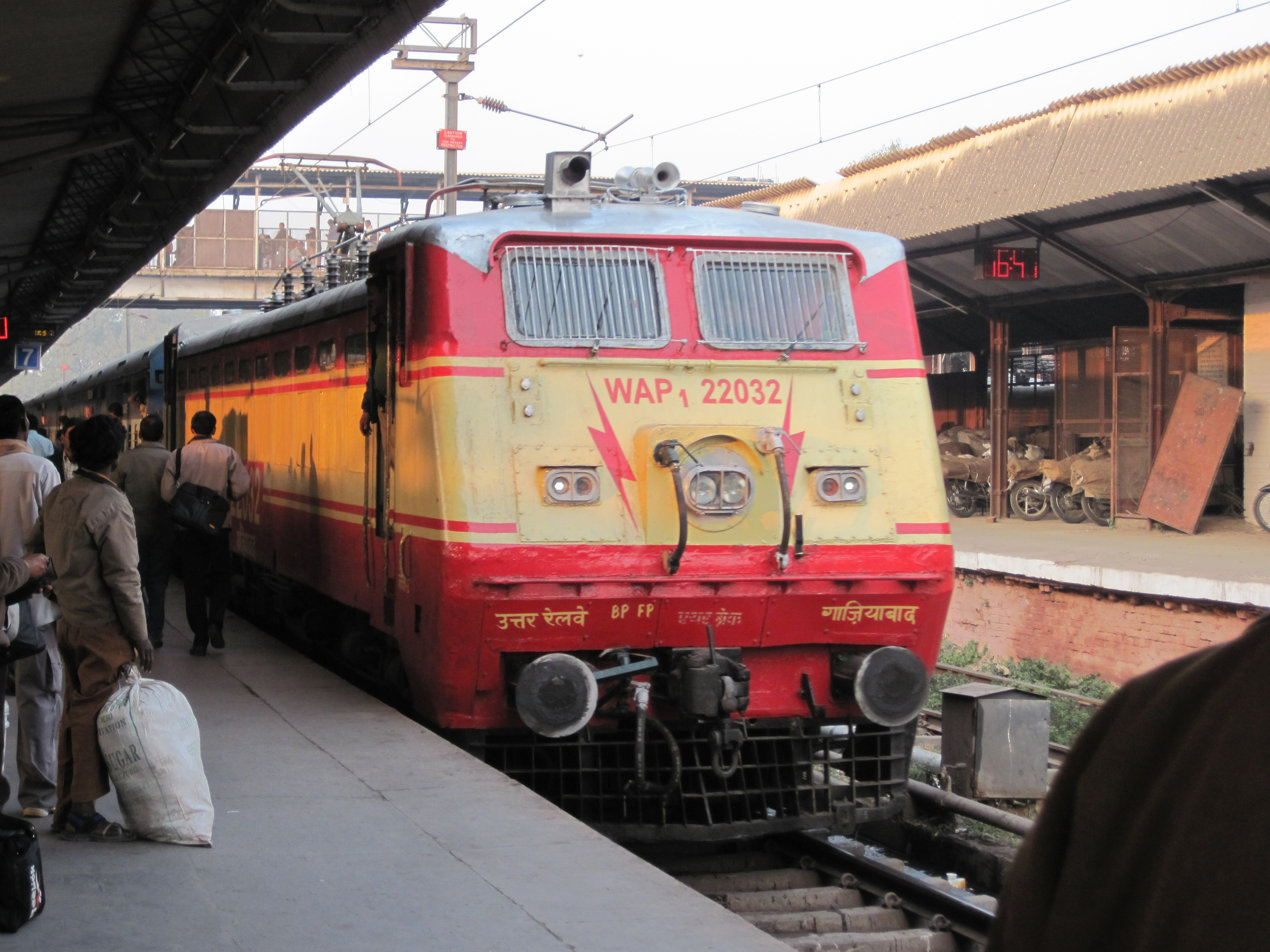
WAP-1 with Raj Livery at Delhi

== Locomotive sheds ==
Zone	Name	Shed code	Quantity
Northern Railway	Alambagh	AMVD	14
North Eastern Railway	Izzatnagar	IZNE	15
Southern Railway	Erode(D)	EDDX	12
Total locomotives active as of November 2026			41

== See also ==
- Rail transport in India#History
- Indian Railways
- Locomotives of India
- Rail transport in India
