= Sealdah Rajdhani Express =

Train in India

Sealdah–New Delhi Rajdhani Express

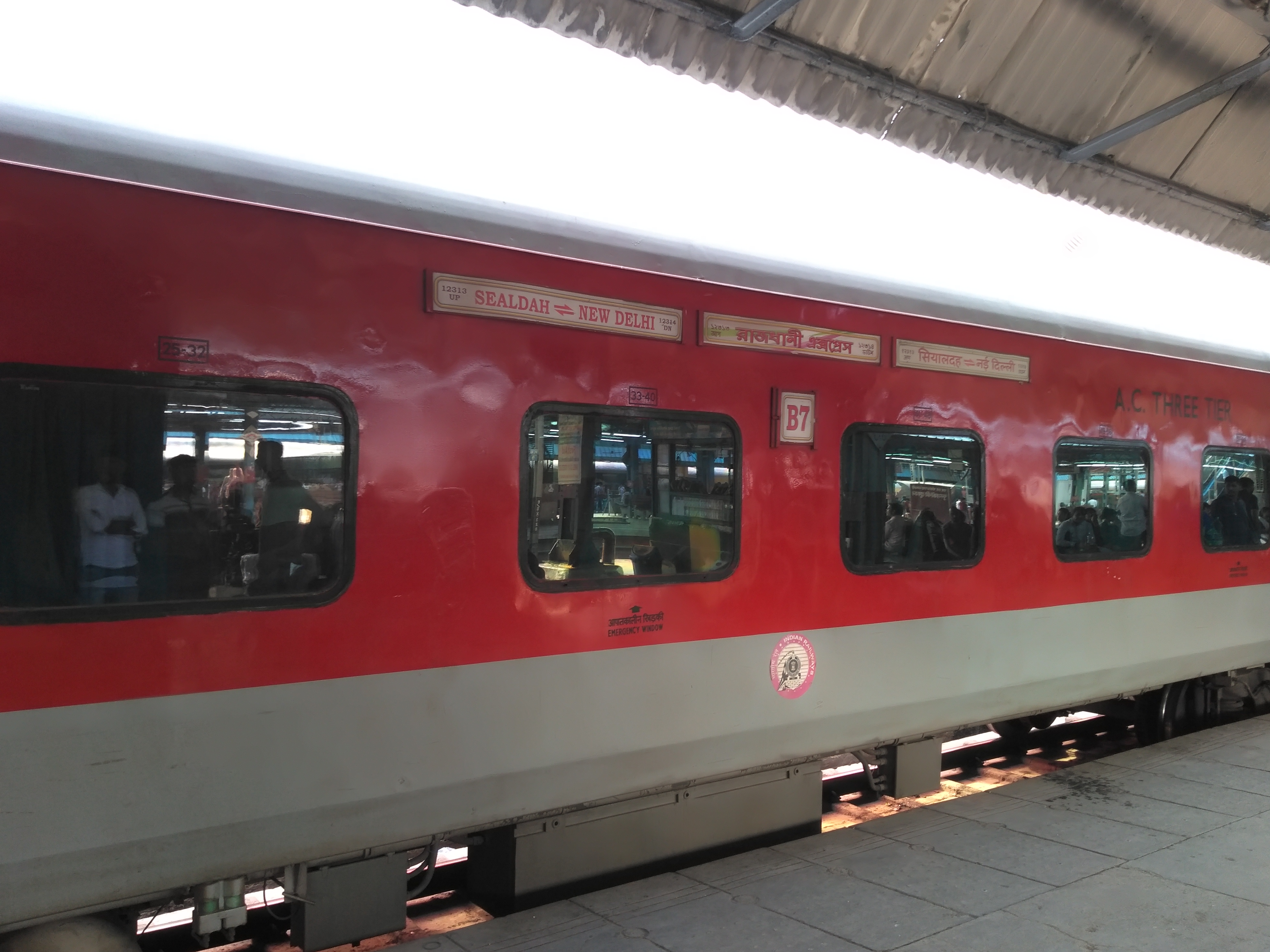
- B7 (AC 3 Tier) coach of Sealdah Rajdhani Express standing at New Delhi railway station

Overview
- Service type: Rajdhani Express
- Locale: West Bengal, Jharkhand, Bihar, Uttar Pradesh & Delhi
- First service: 1 July 2000; 26 years ago
- Current operator: Eastern Railway Zone

Route
- Termini: Sealdah (SDAH); New Delhi (NDLS)
- Stops: 6
- Distance travelled: 1,458 km (906 mi)
- Average journey time: 17 hour 40 minutes
- Service frequency: Daily
- Train number: 12313 / 12314
- Lines used: Calcutta Chord link line; Howrah-Bardhaman chord (from Dankuni Jn.); Bardhaman-Asansol section; Asansol-Gaya section; Gaya–Mughalsarai section; Mughalsarai–Kanpur section; Kanpur–Delhi line (till New Delhi)

On-board services
- Classes: AC First Class, AC 2 Tier, AC 3 Tier
- Seating arrangements: Yes
- Sleeping arrangements: Yes
- Catering facilities: Available
- Observation facilities: Large windows
- Baggage facilities: No
- Other facilities: Below the seats

Technical
- Rolling stock: LHB coach
- Track gauge: 1,676 mm (5 ft 6 in)
- Operating speed: 130 km/h (81 mph) operating speed 83 km/h (52 mph) average including halts
Route map
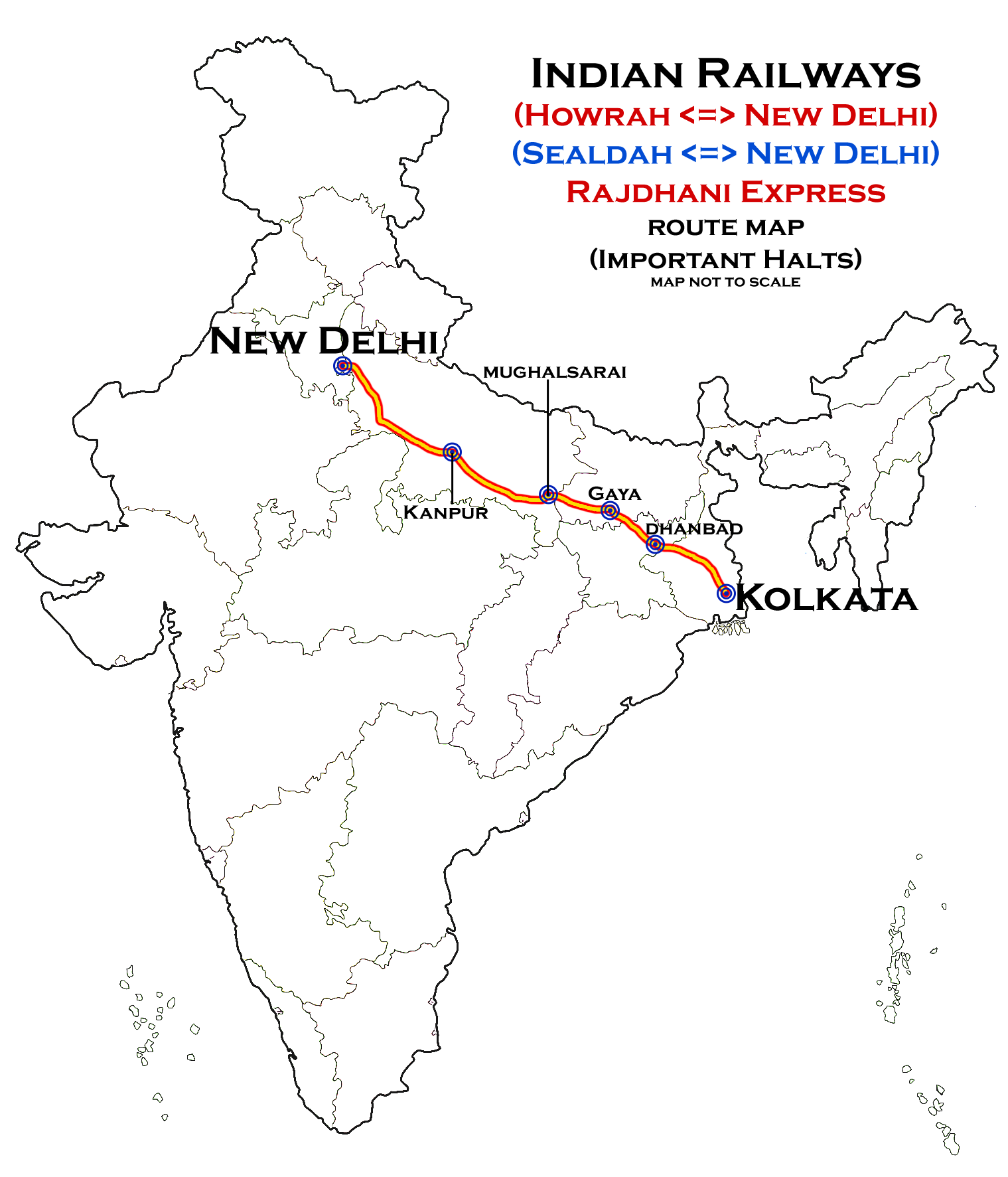

The 12313 / 12314 Sealdah–New Delhi Rajdhani Express is a Rajdhani class train of Indian Railways which connects the capital of West Bengal, Kolkata to the National Capital of India, New Delhi through Sealdah. It is the third Rajdhani Express class train connecting Delhi and Kolkata and is the second-fastest connection between these two cities by rail. It also receives the second highest priority on its route after Howrah Rajdhani. It is also famous for its dignity,and is popularly known as Queen of Eastern Railway.

== Overview ==
Owing to the high demands of the passengers plying between Delhi and Kolkata and to ease down the existing pressure of bookings on the Howrah Rajdhani Express, Indian Railways decided to introduce another Rajdhani class train between these two cities. Since Howrah Division of Eastern Railways already had two existing Rajdhani Express trains, thus Sealdah Division of Eastern Railway was awarded with third Rajdhani Express to West Bengal. Hence on the annual railway budget of FY 2000–01, the then Minister of Railways, Mamata Banerjee, announced the starting of the Sealdah – New Delhi Rajdhani on bi-weekly basis. Based on the same, on 1 July 2000, the first Sealdah Rajdhani Express left for New Delhi from Sealdah for its maiden journey.

On 23 August 2006, the coaches of Sealdah Rajdhani Express were upgraded to LHB coaches to replace the older ICF coaches.

=== Profitability ===
According to Indian Railways, in the FY 2022–23, the 12314 New Delhi-Sealdah rake was the second highest revenue-generating train carrying 509,164 passengers in that period, the train generated the revenue of ₹1,288,169,274 (US$14 million).

== Route and halts ==
- Sealdah
- Durgapur
- Asansol Junction
- Dhanbad Junction
- Gaya Junction
- Pt. Deen Dayal Upadhyaya Junction
- Kanpur Central
- New Delhi

== Traction ==
It is hauled by a Sealdah-based WAP-7 (HOG) equipped locomotive from end to end.

== Time table ==
Station Code	Station name	Arrival	Departure
SDAH	Sealdah	---	16:50
DGR	Durgapur	18:48	18:50
ASN	Asansol Junction	19:16	19:20
DHN	Dhanbad Junction	20:20	20:25
GAYA	Gaya Junction	22:57	23:00
DDU	Pt DD Upadhyaya Junction	01:15	01:25
CNB	Kanpur Central	05:20	05:25
NDLS	New Delhi	10:50	---

== Speed ==
The train can reach its maximum allowed speed of 130 km/h (81 mph), except for two specific sections. One is the 29 km (18 mi) stretch between New Delhi (NDLS) and Chipyana Buzurg (CPYZ), where the Railway is endeavoring to increase the maximum allowed speed from 110 km/h (68 mph) to 130 km/h (81 mph). The other section is Gurpa to Gujhandi near Koderma, comprising a 22 km (14 mi) long ghat portion where trains are permitted to travel at a maximum speed of 80 km/h (50 mph). Within tunnels, the speed limit is further reduced to 65 km/h (40 mph). Additionally, trains briefly touch speeds of 100 km/h (62 mph) over a short distance of approximately 3 km (1.9 mi).

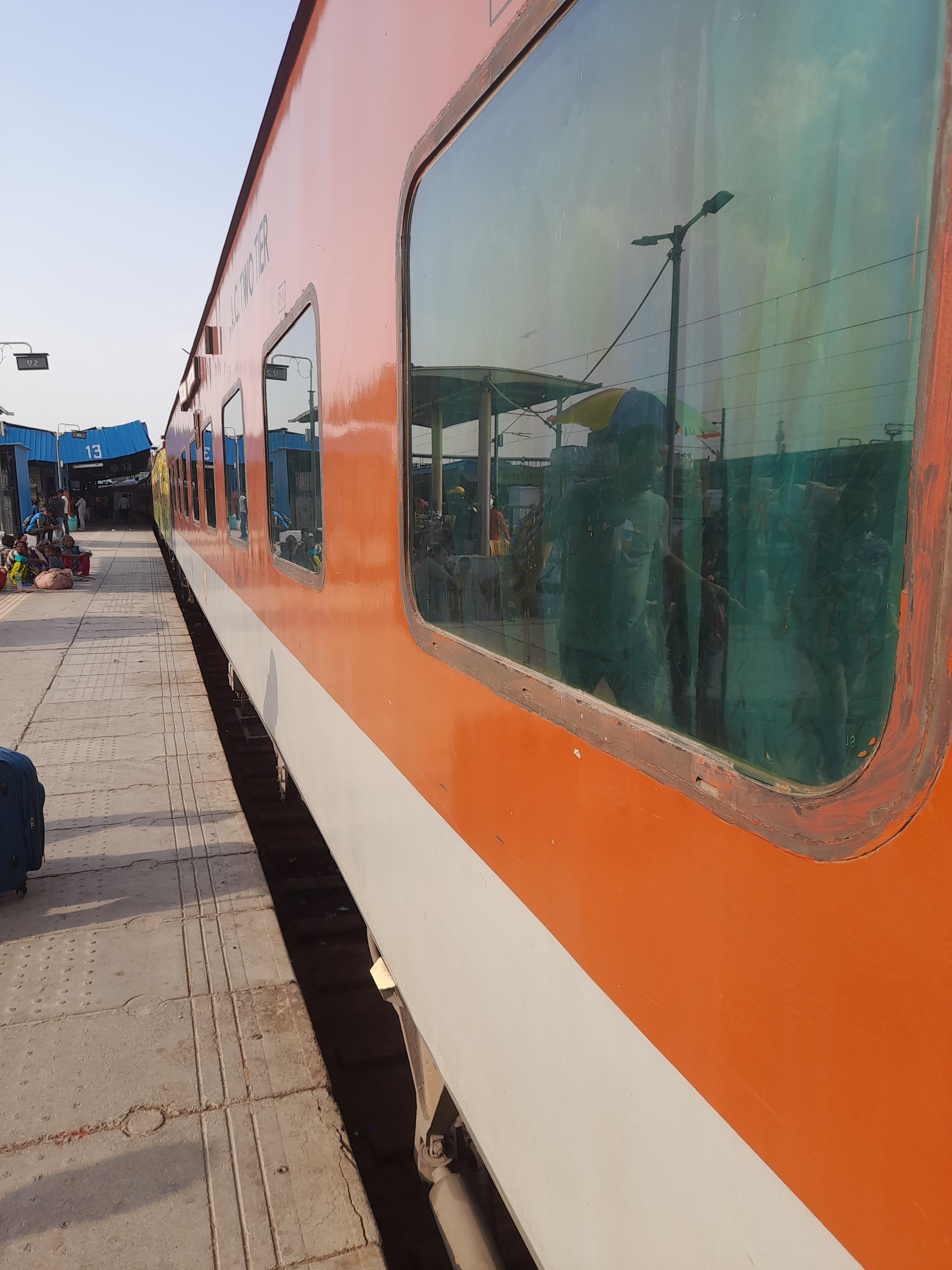
12314 Sealdah Rajdhani Express standing at New Delhi Railway Station platform number 14

In 2019, the Cabinet Committee on Economic Affairs (CCEA) recommended to the government the augmentation of the existing maximum permissible speed of the Delhi – Howrah route from 130 km/h (81 mph) to 160 km/h (99 mph), with the aim of enhancing average speed by a minimum of 60% to facilitate quicker connectivity and trade. In alignment with this directive, the Railway Board approved a project budgeted at Rs. 6,865 crore under the Indian Railway's Mission Raftaar initiative. The project's objective is to elevate the maximum permissible speed of both the Delhi – Howrah and Kanpur – Lucknow routes to 160 km/h (99 mph) by the timeline of 2022–2023. However, there has been no specific update on the progress of the project to date.

== Gallery ==
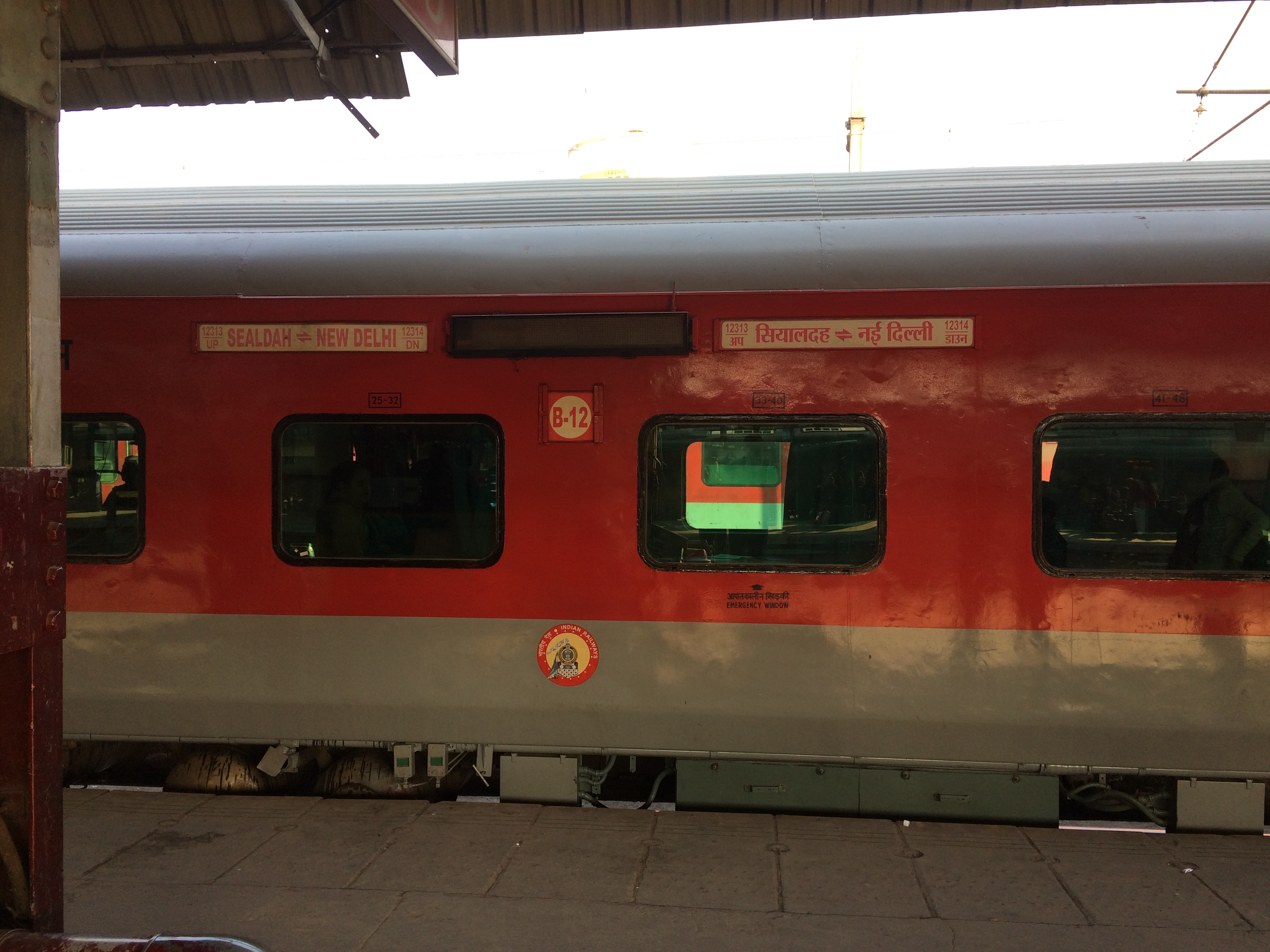
Sealdah Rajdhani Express – AC 3 tier coach – B 12

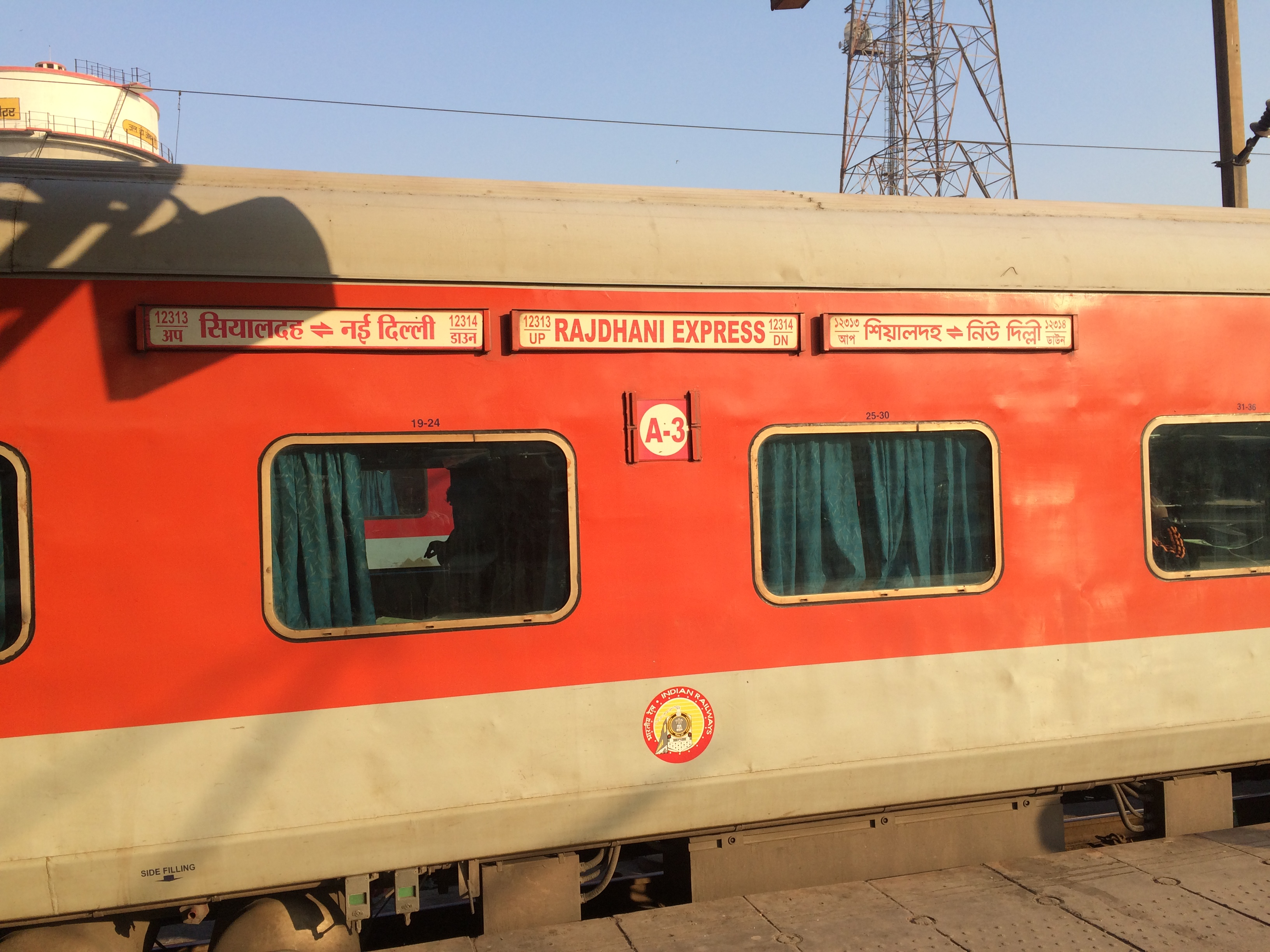
Sealdah Rajdhani Express – AC 2 tier coach

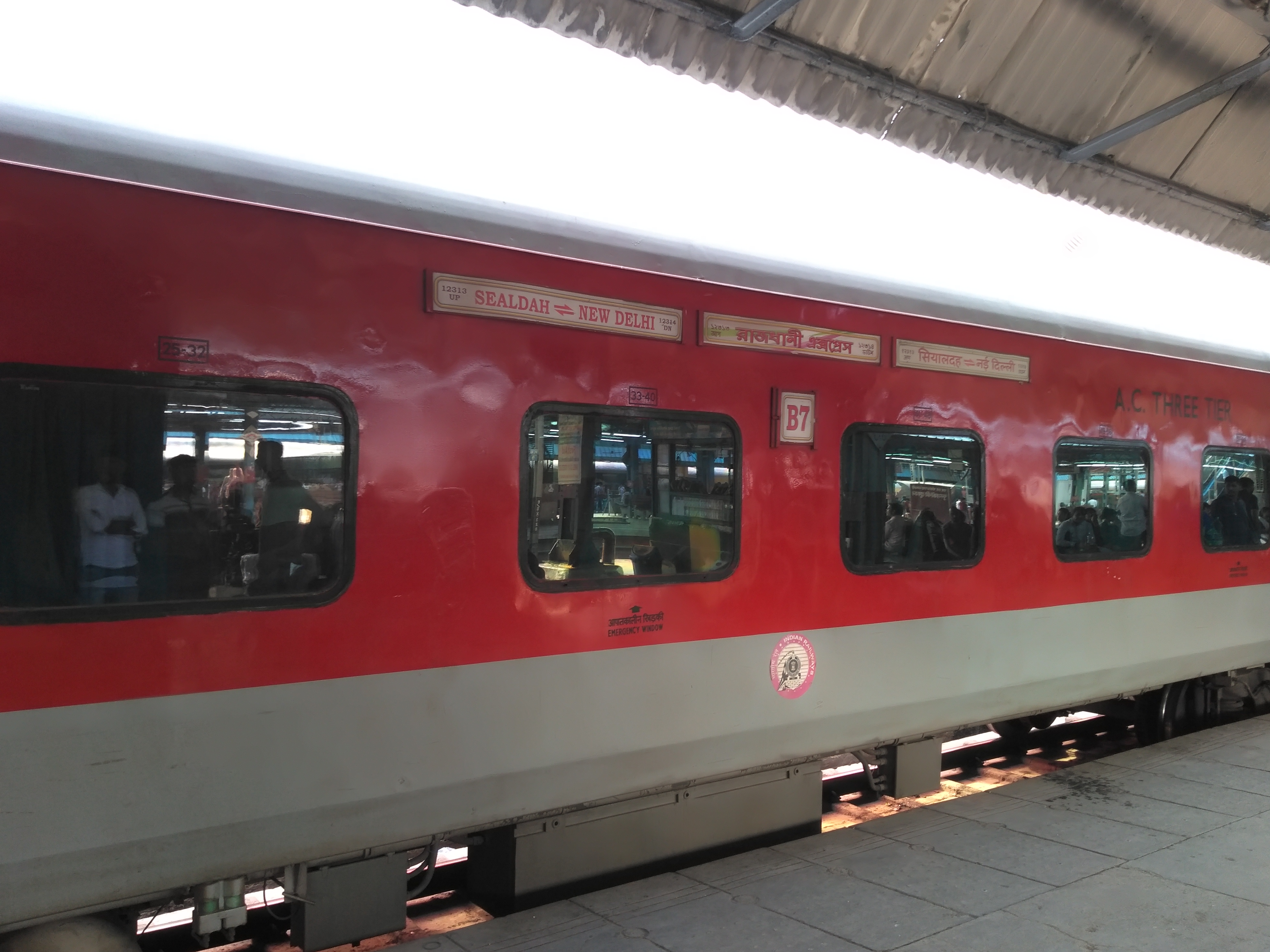
Sealdah Rajdhani Express – AC 3 tier coach – B 7, halted at New Delhi rail station

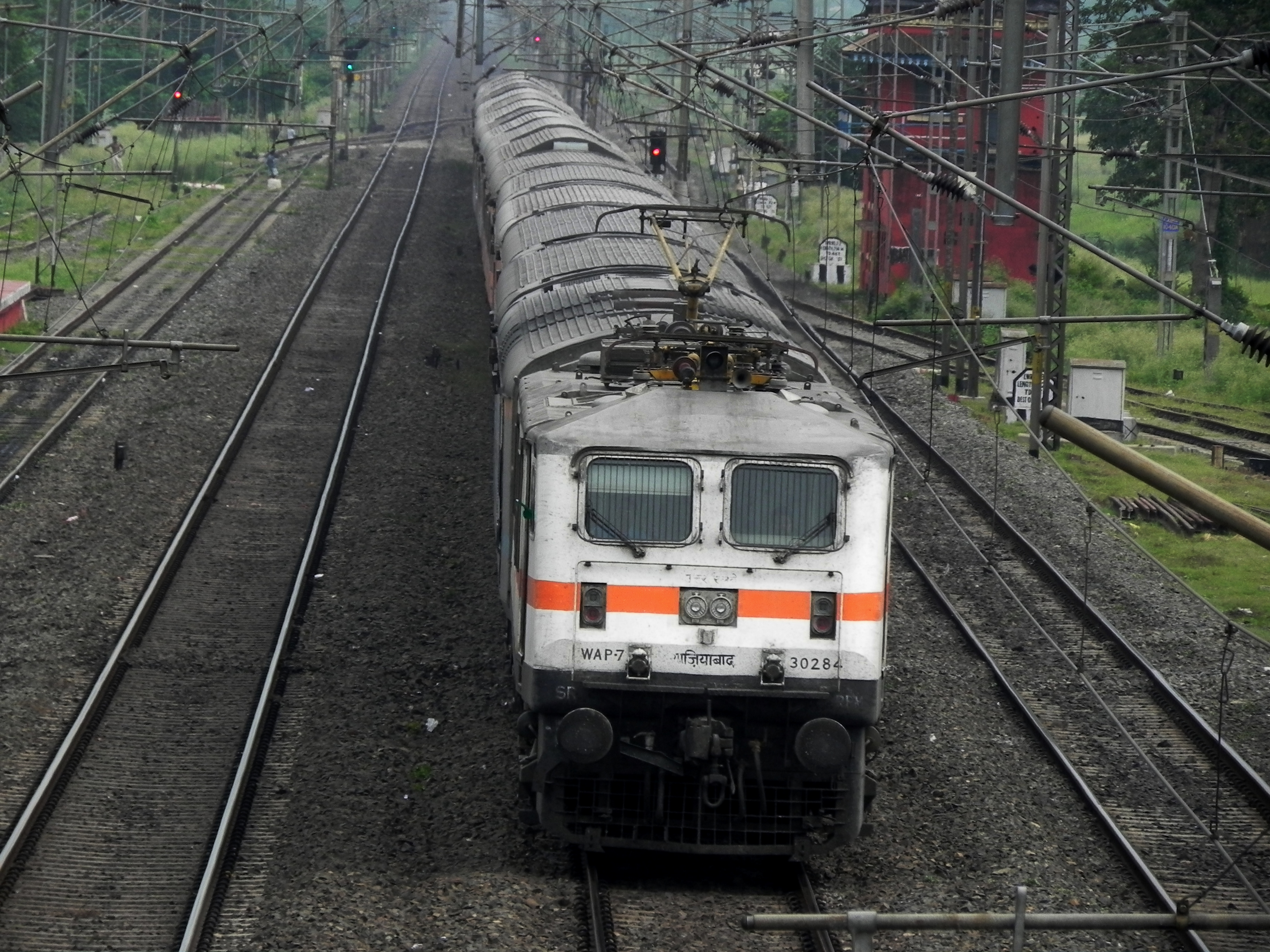
Sealdah bound 12314 Rajdhani Express
