= Howrah–New Delhi Rajdhani Express (via Patna) =

Train in India

Howrah – New Delhi Rajdhani Express

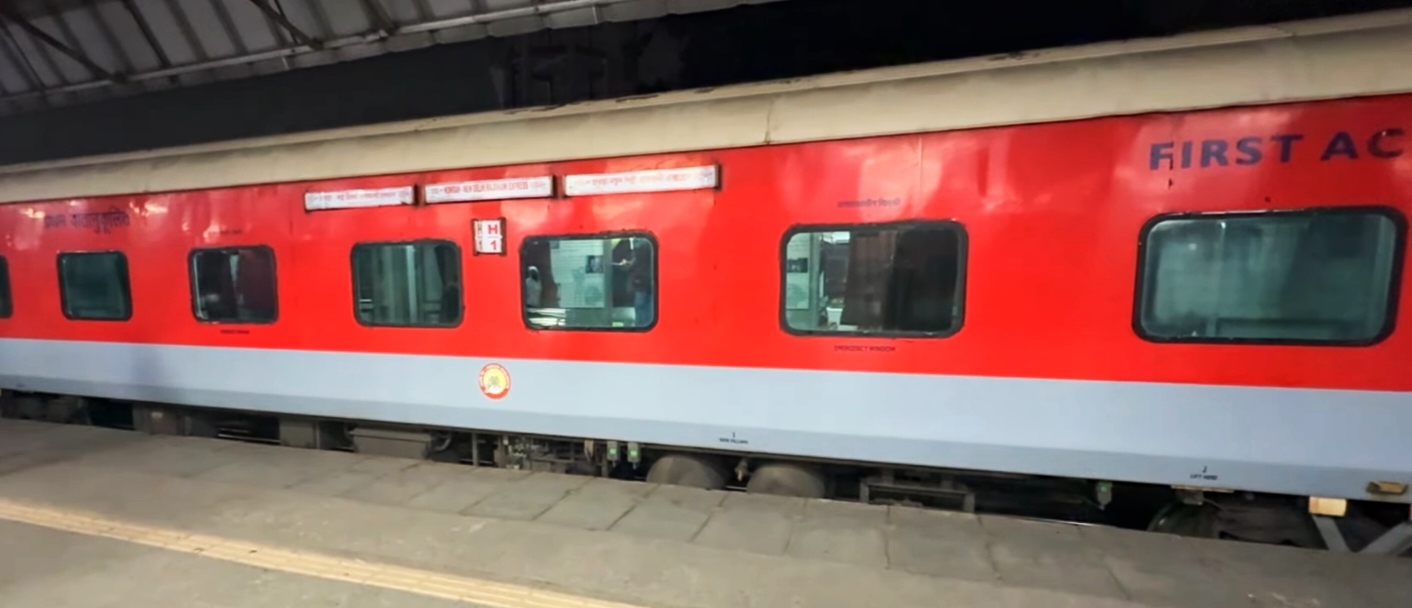
- Howrah Rajdhani Express arrived at Prayagraj Junction

Overview
- Service type: Rajdhani Express
- Locale: West Bengal, Jharkhand, Bihar, Uttar Pradesh & Delhi
- First service: 3 July 1993; 33 years ago
- Current operator: Eastern Railway

Route
- Termini: Howrah (HWH); New Delhi (NDLS)
- Stops: 9
- Distance travelled: 1,531 km (951 mi)
- Average journey time: 19 hrs 45 mins
- Service frequency: Weekly (Note: Runs one day in a week for every direction.)
- Train number: 12305 / 12306
- Lines used: Howrah-Bardhaman chord; Bardhaman–Asansol section; Asansol–Patna section; Patna–Mughalsarai section; Mughalsarai–Kanpur section; Kanpur–Delhi line (till New Delhi)

On-board services
- Classes: AC First, AC 2 tier, AC 3 tier
- Seating arrangements: Yes
- Sleeping arrangements: Yes
- Catering facilities: Pantry car, On-board catering, E-catering
- Observation facilities: Large windows
- Entertainment facilities: On-board Wi-Fi
- Baggage facilities: Available
- Other facilities: Below the seats

Technical
- Rolling stock: LHB coach
- Track gauge: 1,676 mm (5 ft 6 in)
- Operating speed: 130 km/h (81 mph) maximum, 76 km/h (47 mph) average including halts.

The 12305 / 12306 Howrah–New Delhi Rajdhani Express is a Rajdhani class train belonging to Eastern Railway zone that runs between Howrah Junction and New Delhi in India via Patna Junction. It is currently being operated with 12305/12306 train numbers on a weekly basis. It is widely regarded as one of the most premium trains on the Indian Railway network and is given the highest priority in terms of clearance. It is the fastest train on the Howrah-Delhi main line.

== Service ==
The 12305/Howrah–New Delhi Rajdhani Express has an average speed of 77 km/h and covers 1,531 km in 20h 00m. The 12306/New Delhi–Howrah Rajdhani Express has an average speed of 79 km/h and covers 1,531 km in 19h 25m.

== Route and halts ==
The important halts of the train are:

- Howrah Junction
- Barddhaman Junction
- Madhupur Junction
- Jasidih Junction
- Patna Junction
- Pt. Deen Dayal Upadhyaya Junction
- Prayagraj Junction
- Kanpur Central
- New Delhi

== Coach composition ==
The train has standard LHB rakes with max speed of 130 kmph. The train consists of 23 coaches:

- 2 First AC
- 6 AC II Tier
- 11 AC III Tier
- 1 Pantry car
- 2 End-on Generator
- 1 High Capacity Parcel Van

Loco	1	2	3	4	5	6	7	8	9	10	11	12	13	14	15	16	17	18	19	20	21	22	23
	EOG	B1	B2	B3	B4	B5	B6	B7	B8	B9	B10	B11	PC	H1	H2	A1	A2	A3	A4	A5	A6	EOG	HCPV

== Traction ==
During inaugural run, locomotive was WDM-2 then WAP-4 in 60s. As the entire route is fully electrified, it is hauled by a Howrah Loco Shed-based WAP-7 and WAP-5 electric locomotive from Howrah Junction to New Delhi and vice versa. The route of this train cross Patna Junction.

== Rake sharing ==
The train shares its rake with 12301/12302 Howrah Rajdhani Express (via Gaya).

== Incidents ==
The Howrah Rajdhani Express involved in Rafiganj train wreck when luxury Howrah Rajdhani Express train led by Ghaziabad-based WAP-5 derailed on a bridge over the Dhave River in North-Central India, on 10 September 2002. At least 130 people were killed in the crash, which was attributed in some reports to sabotage by a local Maoist terrorist group, the Naxalites.

== See also ==
- Howrah railway station
- New Delhi railway station
- Howrah Rajdhani Express
