= Howrah–New Delhi Rajdhani Express (via Gaya) =

Train in India

Howrah – New Delhi Rajdhani Express

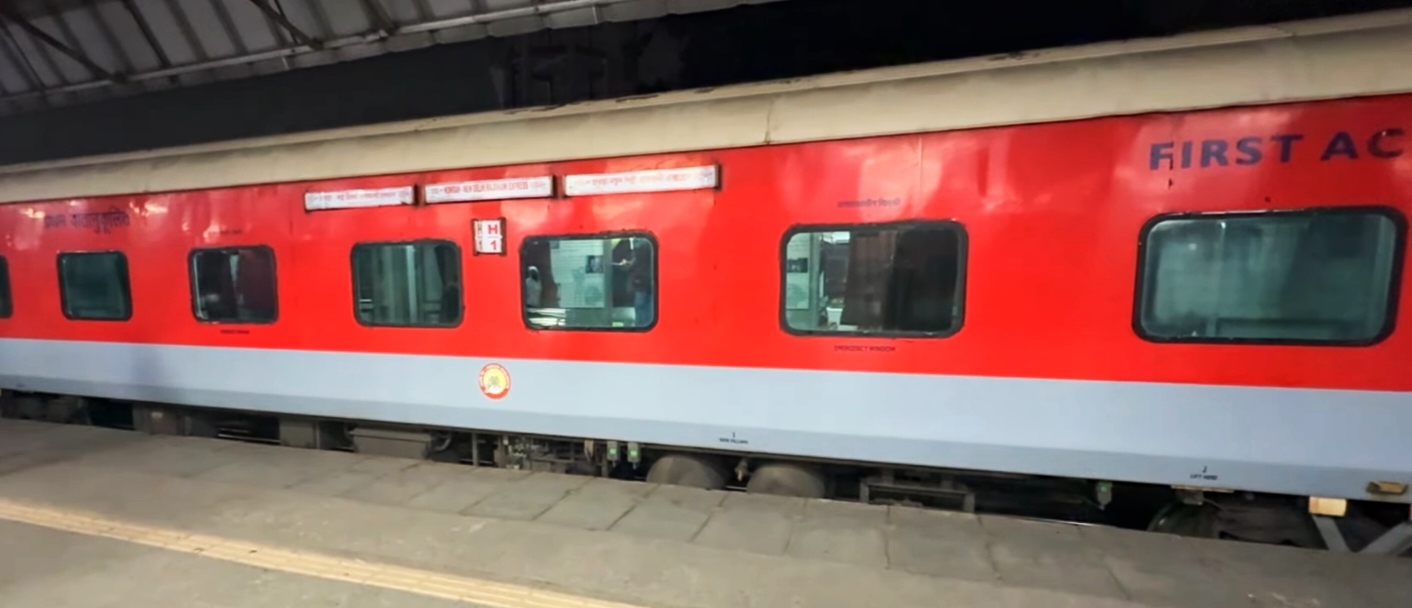
- Howrah Rajdhani Express arrived at Prayagraj Junction

Overview
- Service type: Rajdhani Express
- Locale: West Bengal, Jharkhand, Bihar, Uttar Pradesh & Delhi
- First service: 1 March 1969; 57 years ago
- Current operator: Eastern Railways (ER)
- Ridership: 1168 ; one way per journey

Route
- Termini: Howrah (HWH); New Delhi (NDLS)
- Stops: 7
- Distance travelled: 1,452 km (902 mi)
- Average journey time: 17h 05m
- Service frequency: 6 days a week.
- Train number: 12301 / 12302
- Lines used: Howrah-Bardhaman chord; Bardhaman–Asansol section; Asansol–Gaya section; Gaya–Mughalsarai section; Mughalsarai–Kanpur section; Kanpur–Delhi line (till New Delhi)

On-board services
- Classes: AC First Class (H1); AC 2 Tier (A1); AC 3 Tier (B1)
- Seating arrangements: Yes
- Sleeping arrangements: Yes
- Catering facilities: Available
- Observation facilities: Large Windows
- Entertainment facilities: On-board WiFi
- Baggage facilities: Available
- Other facilities: Below the seats

Technical
- Rolling stock: LHB coach
- Track gauge: 1,676 mm (5 ft 6 in)
- Operating speed: 130 km/h (81 mph) maximum, 85 km/h (53 mph) average including halts.
Route map
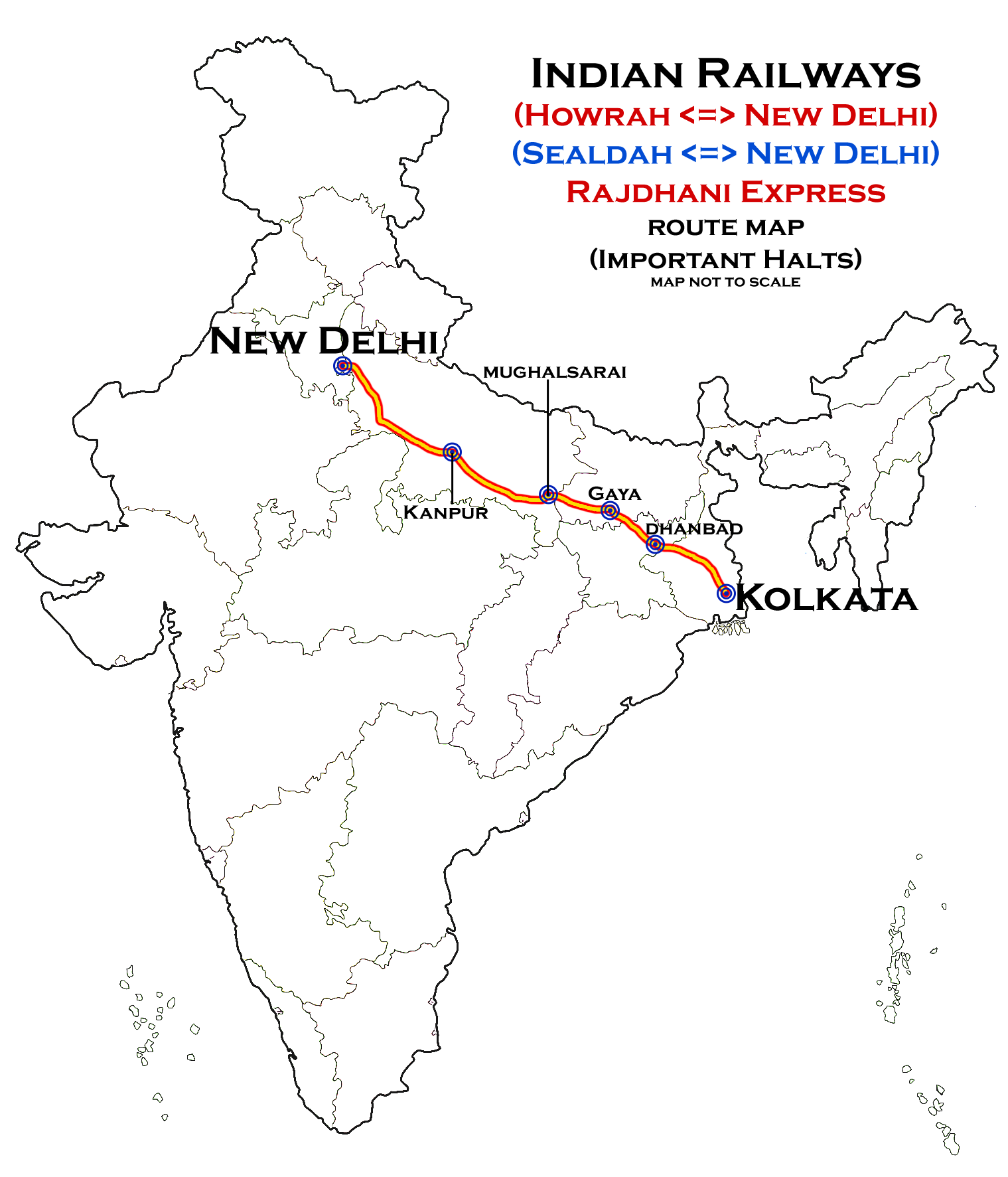

The 12301 / 12302 Howrah–New Delhi Rajdhani Express (via Gaya) (also known as Kolkata Rajdhani Express) is a Rajdhani class Superfast Express train of Indian Railways belonging to Eastern Railway zone that connects the capital city of West Bengal, Kolkata to the national capital of India, New Delhi, via the city of Howrah. This is the first Rajdhani Express of India and is the fastest train of Indian Railways between Kolkata and Delhi. It is also the fastest train operating from Howrah Railway Station. It connects the Howrah Railway Station in Kolkata to the New Delhi Railway Station in Delhi. Howrah Rajdhani Express covers the entire distance of more than 1450 km in just over 17 hours. It is considered as one of the most premium and priority-given trains of IR. It receives the highest priority on its route and is also considered as the most premium train of ER. It is also the third fastest Rajdhani class train in India. It is one of the fastest trains of India. It proudly holds the title of the King of Eastern Railway and the King of Indian Railways.

== History ==
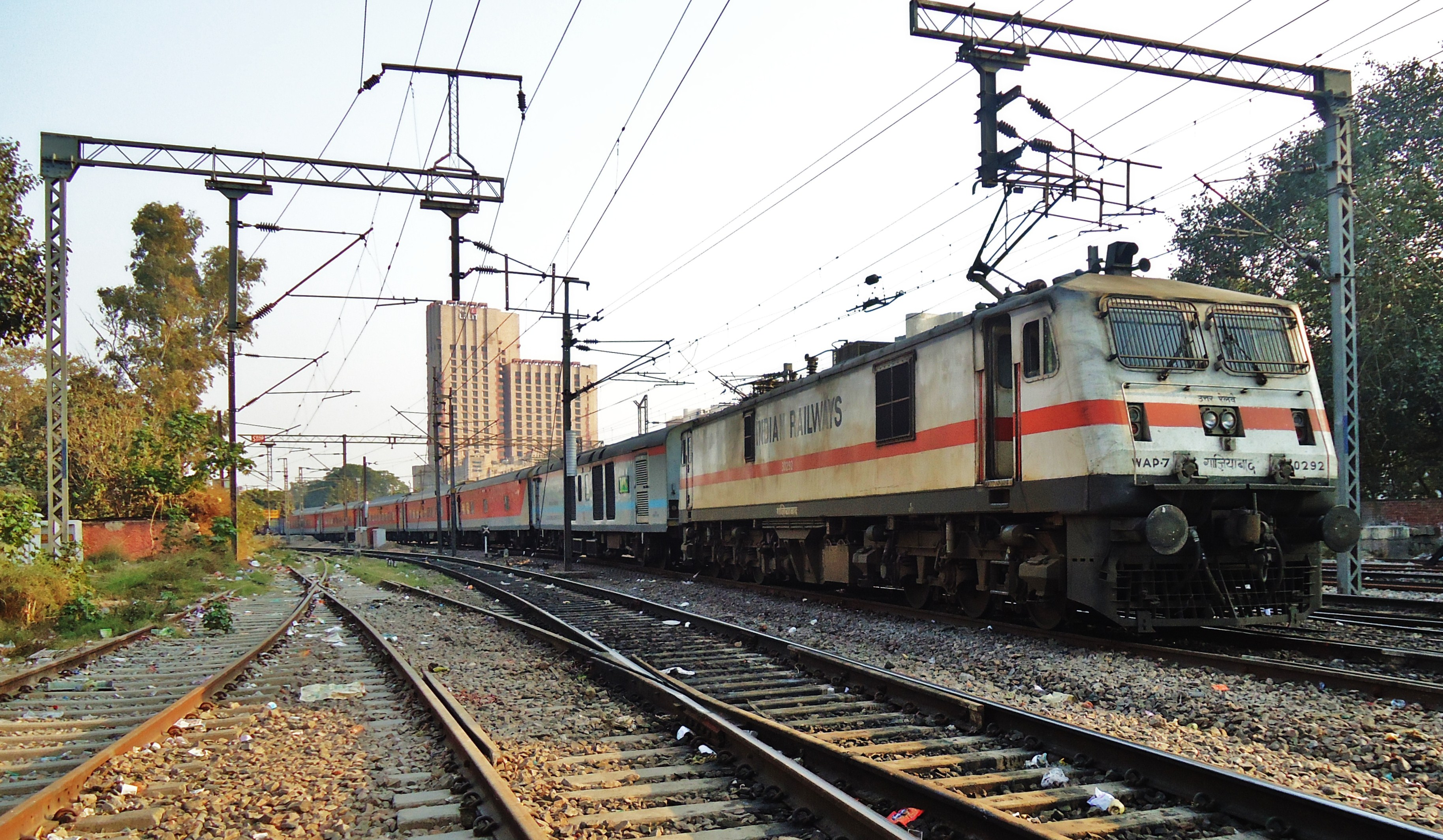
The New Delhi bound 12301 Howrah Rajdhani Express entering into the suburbs of New Delhi, on its final leg of the journey

From 1965 onward Ministry of Railways (India) was looking for options to reduce the time of travel between important destinations by implementing new technology. For that very purpose the Howrah–Delhi main line was chosen for the trials owing to its technological superiority in terms of feasibility and others. Thus in the Railway Budget of 1969–70, an introduction of a new superfast train was announced which would connect Delhi to Kolkata in less than 18 hours. Until then the fastest trains between these two cities used to take more than 20 hours.

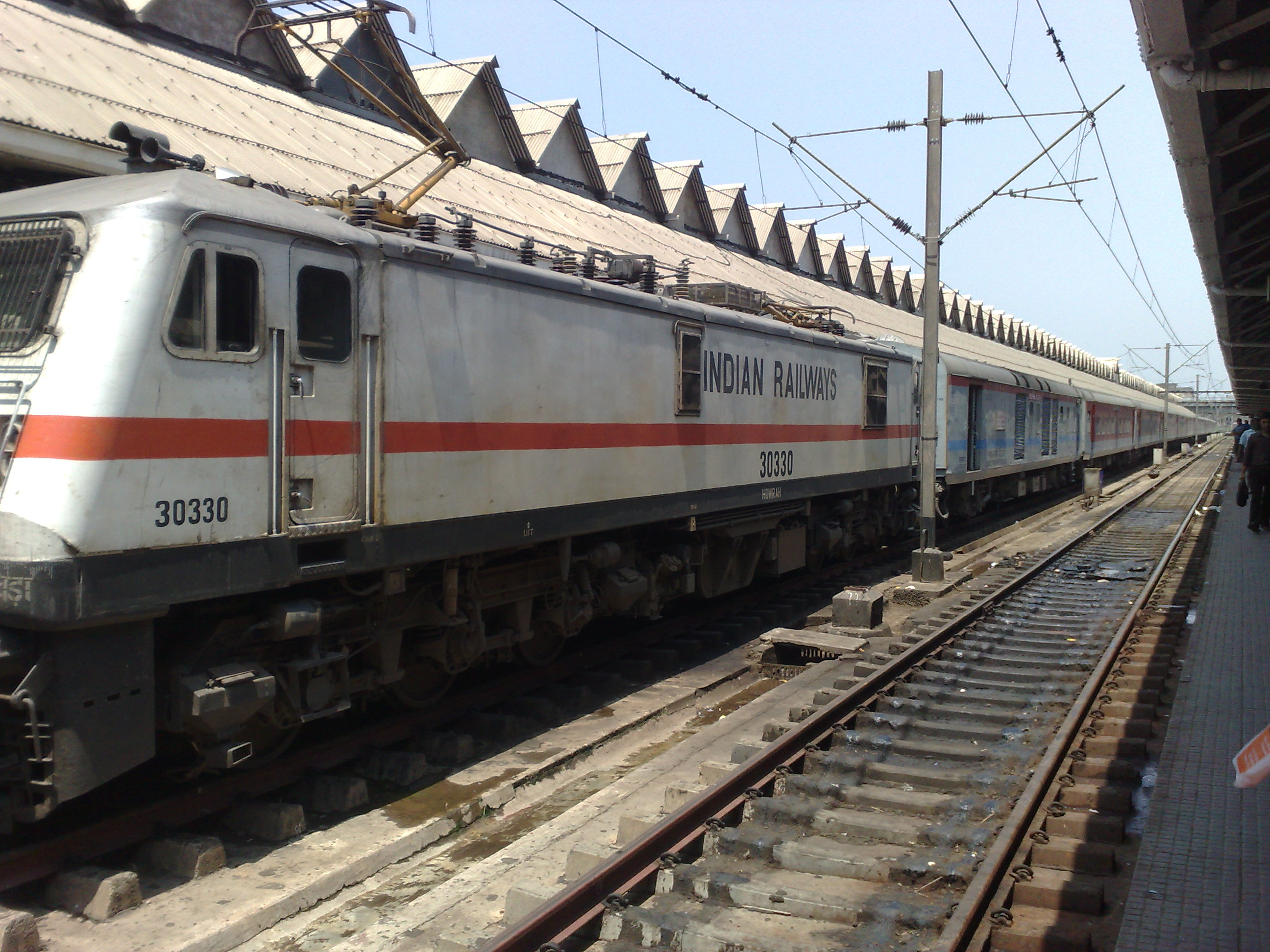
Howrah bound 12302 Rajdhani Express standing at Howrah Railway Station, after completing its journey from New Delhi

On 1 March 1969 the first Rajdhani Express left from New Delhi to Howrah at 1730 hrs and arrived at its destination at 1050 hrs on the next day, completing 1450 km in a record time of 17 hours 20 minutes. The honor of hauling the first Rajdhani was done by the WDM-4 class locomotive of Indian Railways. The return Rajdhani Express left Howrah Junction on 3 March 1969 at 1700 hrs and arrived at New Delhi on its next day at 1020 hrs. The maximum permissible speed of the Howrah Rajdhani Express was kept 120 km/h for safety reasons, thus making it the fastest train of India at that point of time.

The first train carried nine coaches, which were one Dining Car, one AC First Class, five AC Chair Car and two Generator/Power Car. The price of at that time was set at Rs. 280 for the AC First Class and Rs. 90 for AC Chair Car respectively. The coaches were specially designed and developed by Integral Coach Factory Perambur and had one of its kind vacuum brakes and under-slung air conditioning systems. Additionally the AC First Class was of 3 Cabin + 3 Coupe model while the AC Chair Car was of 2 x 2 seating model. At that time the train use to ply only on Monday and Friday respectively from both ends and had stoppages at Kanpur Central railway station, Mughalsarai Junction railway station and Netaji Subhas Chandra Bose Gomoh railway station only.

On 1 November 1971 the speed was upgraded to 130 km/h, thus reducing the time of journey by 25 minutes from both ends. At that time the train was hauled by twin WDM-4S locomotive from Mughalsarai Shed of Indian Railways. In 1983, the Research Design and Standards Organisation in association with Chittaranjan Locomotive Works manufactured the 3900 HP WAP-1 class locomotive exclusively for Howrah Rajdhani Express. And with the introduction of the WAP-1 class locomotive, the train length was increased to 18 coaches, by adding additional AC Two Tier Coaches. Incidentally, the locomotives were painted in the same livery as that of the Howrah Rajdhani Express. On the very same year i.e. on 1 April 1983 owing to the high popularity and huge demand the frequency of the Howrah Rajdhani (via Gaya) was increased to 4 days a week, then to 5 days a week from 1 October 1983 and finally to present 6 days a week from 19 May 2003.

In 1992, the coaches were again redeveloped, and the Under-slung Air Conditioning System was replaced by Roof Mounted Air Condition Package Unit (RMPU), thus becoming the only train to have it at that point of time. In 1993, Air Conditioned 3 Tier coaches were added in the train and of 3 July 1993 another service via Patna Junction railway station was also introduced from Howrah and from New Delhi on Sunday and Friday respectively.

On 3 February 2006, both the pairs of Howrah Rajdhani Express were upgraded to the LHB coaches, thus paving the way for the replacement and the end of the glorious era of the ICF coaches of Rajdhani Express. While on 2 April 2013, WiFi service was introduced in the train, thus making it the only train of Indian Railways to have WiFi facility in a moving train. And finally on 23 December 2017, the train was upgraded to the Swarna Standards of Indian Railways, laced with modern amenities and facilities for the passengers.

Achievements and records:

1. India's first Rajdhani.
2. India's first train to get upgraded upto 130 km/h maximum permissible speed.
3. India's first train to get Electric WAP-Series Locomotives.
4. India's first train to get Roof Mounted Air Condition Packaged Unit system (RMPU).
5. India's first train to get WiFi service.
6. India's first Rajdhani to get upgraded to the Swarna Standards of Indian Railways.

== Schedule and route details ==
The 12301/12302 Howrah – New Delhi Rajdhani Express follows the Dhanbad – Gaya Grand Chord route as part of its journey between Delhi and Howrah. The 12301 Howrah – New Delhi Rajdhani Express operates daily except on Sundays, while the returning train, 12302 New Delhi – Howrah Rajdhani Express, does not run on Fridays. On these specific days, the Howrah – New Delhi Rajdhani service is provided by the 12305/12306 Howrah – New Delhi Rajdhani Express, which travels via the Asansol – Jasidih – Patna route to connect Delhi and Howrah.

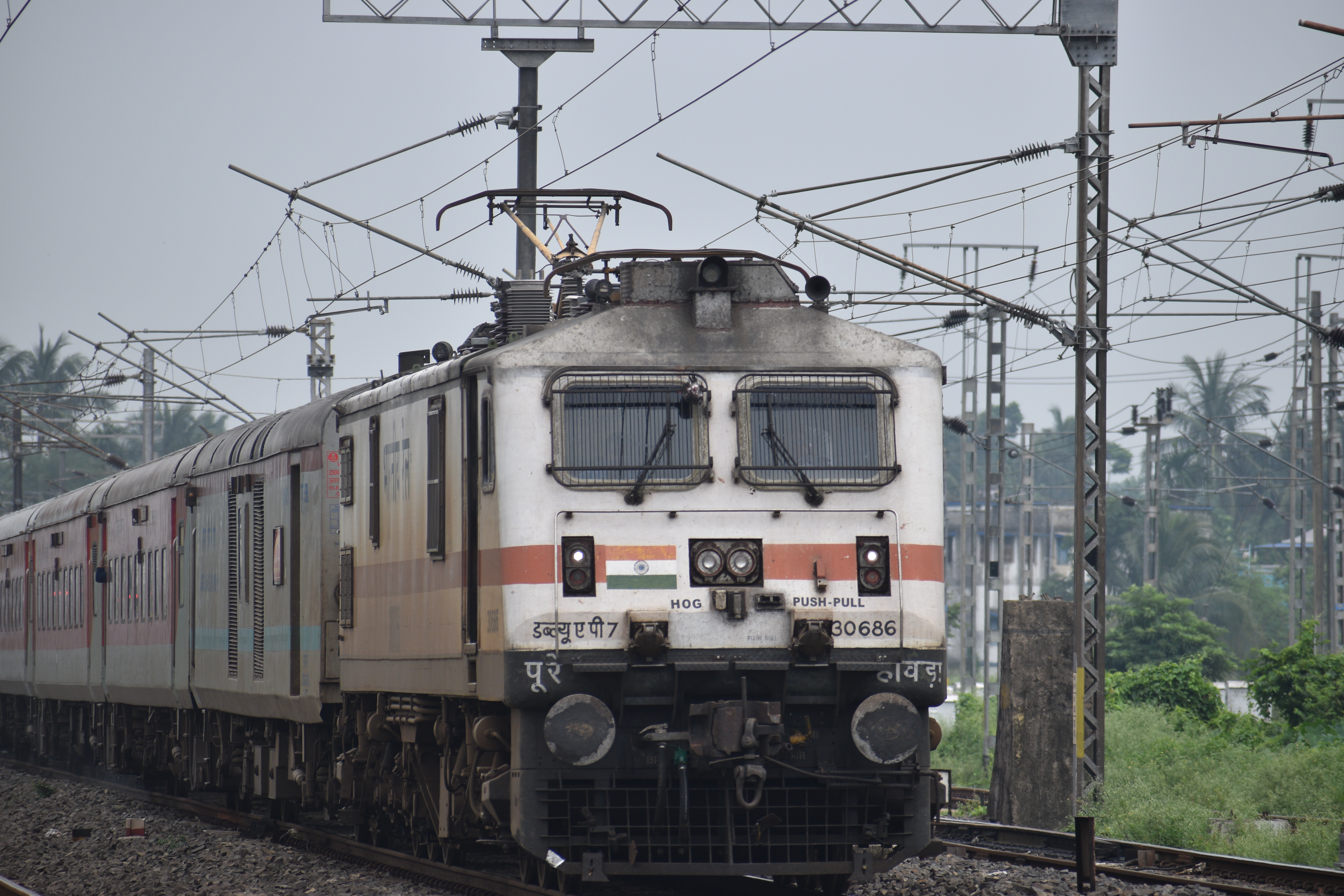
Howrah Rajdhani Express, hauled by the WAP-7 electric locomotive

The Rajdhani Express bound for New Delhi (train number 12301) departs from Howrah Railway Station at 16:50 hrs and reaches New Delhi at 10:05 hrs the following day, covering a distance of 1452 km in 17 hours and 15 minutes, achieving an average speed of 84 km/h. On the return journey, the New Delhi-bound Rajdhani Express (train number 12302) departs from New Delhi at 16:50 hrs and arrives in Howrah at 09:55 hrs the next day, completing its journey in 17 hours and 5 minutes, with an average speed of 85 km/h.

== Route and halts ==
The Important halts of the train are :

• Howrah Junction

• Asansol Junction

• Dhanbad Junction

• Parasnath

• Gaya Junction

• Pandit Deen Dayal Upadhyaya Junction

• Prayagraj Junction

• Kanpur Central

• New Delhi

== Traction ==
Earlier during first run was WDM-2 then WAP-4 in the 60s. As the entire route is fully electrified it is hauled by a Howrah Loco Shed-based WAP-7 electric locomotive from Howrah Junction to New Delhi and vice versa.

== Rake sharing ==
The train is rake sharing with 12305/12306 Howrah–New Delhi Rajdhani Express (via Patna).

== See also ==
- Express trains in India
- Howrah–Delhi main line
- Sealdah Rajdhani Express
- New Delhi railway station
- Howrah railway station
