= List of rail tunnels in India by length =

This is a list of the longest rail tunnels in India. In considering tunnels for this section, tunnels of underground metro railways have not been counted. Only tunnels on the main Indian Railways network longer than 1,000 metres (3,300 ft) have been listed. Under construction and proposed tunnels have been listed separately.

== Location ==
Most of the tunnels listed below are located in the Western Ghats, the only mountain range in the country that has good railway connectivity. Most long tunnels are in the Himalayas, especially in Jammu & Kashmir as part of the USBRL Project. Tunnel 50 of USBRL is the current longest railway tunnel in India.

== List ==
| Name | Track length | Station 1 | Station 2 | State | Railway Division | Year of Opening | Coordinates | Picture |
|---|---|---|---|---|---|---|---|---|
| Tunnel T-50 | 12,775 metres (41,913 ft) | Sumber | Khari | Jammu and Kashmir | Northern Railway | 2024 | 33°18′13.24″N 75°7′13.40″E | |
| Pir Panjal Railway Tunnel | 11,215 metres (36,795 ft) | Banihal railway station | Hillar Shahabad | Jammu and Kashmir | Northern Railway | 2013 | 33°27′44.30″N 75°11′38.46″E | |
| Tunnel T-44 | 11,130 metres (36,520 ft) | Sawalkote | Sangaldan | Jammu and Kashmir | Northern Railway | 2025 | 33°12′43.35″N 75°1′43.24″E | |
| Tunnel T-49 | 10,178 metres (33,392 ft) | Sangaldan | Sumber | Jammu and Kashmir | Northern Railway | 2024 | 33°17′10.59″N 75°1′36.20″E | |
| Tunnel T-42 | 9,316 metres (30,564 ft) | Dugga | Sawalkote | Jammu and Kashmir | Northern Railway | 2025 | 33°10′37.21″N 74°56′26.82″E | |
| Tunnel T-52 | 8,610 metres (28,250 ft) | Khari | Banihal | Jammu and Kashmir | Northern Railway | 2024 | 33°23′27.12″N 75°8′16.78″E | |
| Rapuru (P-4) | 6,642.25 metres (21,792.2 ft) | Vellikallu | Cherlopalli | Andhra Pradesh | South Central Railway | 2019 | 14°8′15″N 79°28′34″E | |
| Karbude (T-35) | 6,506 metres (21,345 ft) | Ukshi | Bhoke | Maharashtra | Konkan Railway | 1997 | 17°6′9″N 73°24′59″E | |
| Tunnel T-43 | 6,292 metres (20,643 ft) | Sawalkote | Sangaldan | Jammu and Kashmir | Northern Railway | 2025 | 33°10′11.16″N 75°2′31.57″E | |
| Tunnel T-36 | 5,941 metres (19,491 ft) | Reasi | Bakkal | Jammu and Kashmir | Northern Railway | 2025 | 33°5′33.36″N 74°52′31.09″E | |
| Tunnel T-34 | 5,098 metres (16,726 ft) | Katra | Reasi | Jammu and Kashmir | Northern Railway | 2025 | 33°2′4.29″N 74°54′56.52″E | |
| Nathuwadi (T-6) | 4,389 metres (14,400 ft) | Vinhere | Diwankhavati | Maharashtra | Konkan Railway | 1997 | 17°53′37″N 73°23′14″E | |
| Tike (T-39) | 4,077 metres (13,376 ft) | Ratnagiri | Nivasar | Maharashtra | Konkan Railway | 1997 | 16°58′48″N 73°23′42″E | |
| Berdewadi (T-49) | 4,000 metres (13,000 ft) | Adavali | Vilavade | Maharashtra | Konkan Railway | 1997 | 16°53′43″N 73°36′22″E | |
| Tunnel T-37 | 3,493 metres (11,460 ft) | Bakkal | Dugga | Jammu and Kashmir | Northern Railway | 2025 | 33°9′27.19″N 74°52′26.35″E | |
| Savarde (T-17) | 3,429 metres (11,250 ft) | Kamathe | Sawarda | Maharashtra | Konkan Railway | 1997 | 17°27′35″N 73°31′19″E | |
| Barcem (T-73) | 3,343 metres (10,968 ft) | Balli | Canacona | Goa | Konkan Railway | 1997 | 15°3′49″N 74°1′54″E | |
| Borail BG (T-10) | 3,235 metres (10,614 ft) | Jatinga lampur | Halflong Hill | Assam | Northeast Frontier Railway | 2015 | | |
| Tunnel T-33 | 3,209 metres (10,528 ft) | Katra | Reasi | Jammu and Kashmir | Northern Railway | 2025 | 33°0′20.48″N 74°55′2.53″E | |
| Tunnel T-23 | 3,120 metres (10,240 ft) | Udhampur | Chak Rakhwal | Jammu and Kashmir | Northern Railway | 2014 | 32°56′28.97″N 75°9′32.21″E | |
| Tunnel T-35 | 3,007 metres (9,865 ft) | Katra | Reasi | Jammu and Kashmir | Northern Railway | 2025 | 33°5′0.69″N 74°54′38.02″E | |
| Karwar (T-80) | 2,950 metres (9,680 ft) | Karwar railway station | Harwada railway station | Karnataka | Konkan Railway | 1997 | | |
| Honnavar (T-84) | 2,830 metres (9,280 ft) | Harwada railway station | Ankola railway station | Karnataka | Konkan Railway | 1997 | | |
| Chowk (T-3) | 2,628 metres (8,622 ft) | Panvel | Karjat | Maharashtra | Central Railway | 2006 | 18°55′5″N 73°17′10″E | |
| Parchuri (T-27) | 2,552 metres (8,373 ft) | Sangameshwar | Ukshi railway station | Maharashtra | Konkan Railway | 1997 | 17°9′30″N 73°28′57″E | |
| Lalsot Tunnel | 2,510 metres (8,230 ft) | Didwana | Indawa | Rajasthan | North Western Railway | 2014 | | |
| Khowai (T-2) | 2,500 metres (8,200 ft) | Mungiakami | Shambuhari | Tripura | Northeast Frontier Railway | 2008 | | |
| Tunnel T-25 | 2,497 metres (8,192 ft) | Chak Rakhwal | Katra | Jammu and Kashmir | Northern Railway | 2014 | 32°56′45″N 75°3′07.1″E | |
| Sangar (T-4) | 2,454 metres (8,051 ft) | Sangar | Manwal | Jammu and Kashmir | Northern Railway | 2005 | | |
| Monkey Hill (T-25C/T-49) | 2,304 metres (7,559 ft) | Karjat | Khandala | Maharashtra | Central Railway | 1982 | | |
| Mohape (T-27) | 2,304 metres (7,559 ft) | Mohape | Panvel | Maharashtra | Central Railway & Konkan Railway | 1997 | | |
| Aravali (T-21) | 2,161 metres (7,090 ft) | Aravali | Sangameshwar | Maharashtra | Konkan Railway | 1997 | | |
| Chiplun (T-16) | 2,116 metres (6,942 ft) | Chiplun railway station | Kamathe railway station | Maharashtra | Konkan Railway | | | |
| Tamelong (T-8) | 2,052 metres (6,732 ft) | Vangaichungpao | Tamenglong | Manipur | Northeast Frontier Railway | 2016 | | |
| Longtarai MG (T-13) | 1,994 metres (6,542 ft) | Lower Halflong | Ditokchherra | Assam | Northeast Frontier Railway | 1903 | Abandoned | |
| Ramling | 1,936 metres (6,352 ft) | Osmanabad | Gad Deodari | Maharashtra | Central Railway | 2007 | | |
| Thizama BG(T-8) | 1,849 metres (6,066 ft) | Thizama | Zubza | Nagaland | Northeast Frontier Railway | 2018 | | |
| Parsik Tunnel | 1,681 metres (5,515 ft) | Thane | Mumbra | Maharashtra | Central Railway | 1916 | 19°11′19.36″N 73°0′54.77″E | |
| Bogada Tunnel | 1,600 metres (5,200 ft) | Dorabhavi | Diguvametta | Andhra Pradesh | South Central Railway | 1936 | | |
| Saranda (T-3) | 1,600 metres (5,200 ft) | Goilkera | Mahadevsal | Jharkhand | South Eastern Railway | 2020 | 25°00′00″N 85°30′45″E | |
| Tunnel T-24 | 1,535 metres (5,036 ft) | Udhampur | Chak Rakhwal | Jammu and Kashmir | Northern Railway | 2014 | 32°56′25″N 75°6′39.3″E | |
| Saranda (T-1 & T-2) | 1,521 metres (4,990 ft) | Goilkera | Mahadevsal | Jharkhand | South Eastern Railway | 1900 | 25°00′00″N 85°30′45″E | |
| Gurpa Tunnel | 1,444 metres (4,738 ft) | Gurpa | Gujhandi | Jharkhand | East-Central Railway | 1916 | | |
| Borra Tunnel | 1,369 metres (4,491 ft) | Araku | Borraguhalu | Andhra Pradesh | East-Coastal Railway | 1957 | | |
| Tunnel T-26 | 1,352 metres (4,436 ft) | Chak Rakhwal | Katra | Jammu and Kashmir | Northern Railway | 2014 | 32°56′47″N 75°1′25.6″E | |
| Laxmipur Tunnel | 1,296 metres (4,252 ft) | Laxmipur | Singaram | Odisha | East-Coastal Railway | 1957 | | |
| Zhobo Tunnel | 1,225 metres (4,019 ft) | Mesra | Sidhwar | Jharkhand | East-Central Railway | 2020 | | |
| Darakhoh-Maramjhiri Tunnel | 1,165 metres (3,822 ft) | Darakhoh | Maramjhiri | Madhya Pradesh | West Central Railway | 1900 | | |
| Budhni Tunnel | 1,089 metres (3,573 ft) | Budhni | Barkheda | Madhya Pradesh | West-Central Railway | 1900 | | |
| Bhanwar Tonk Tunnel | 1,024 metres (3,360 ft) | Kargi Road | Bhanwar Tonk | Chhattisgarh | South East-Central Railway | 1907 | | |
| Debari BG Tunnel | 1,000 metres (3,300 ft) | Debari | Rana Pratapnagar | Rajasthan | North Western Railway | 2007 | | |
| Chellamma | 1,000 metres (3,300 ft) | Bogada | Chellamma | Andhra Pradesh | South Central Railway | 1936 | | |

== Under Construction & Proposed Tunnels ==
| Name | Track length | Station 1 | Station 2 | State | Railway Division | Expected Completion | Coordinates | Picture |
|---|---|---|---|---|---|---|---|---|
| Thane Creek Tunnel | 21,150 metres (69,390 ft) | Bandra Kurla Complex | Thane | Maharashtra | Mumbai–Ahmedabad High Speed Railway | 2028 | Under Construction | |
| Keylong Tunnel | 21,150 metres (69,390 ft) | Kyelang | Darcha | Himachal Pradesh | Northern Railway | 2034 (Proposed) | DPR under approval | |
| Devprayag Rail Tunnel | 15,270 metres (50,100 ft) | Devprayag | Kirti Nagar | Uttarakhand | Northern Railway | Dec 2026 | 30.1271199°N 78.6026220°E | |
| Saheibung Tunnel (T-12) | 10,275 metres (33,711 ft) | Tupul | Imphal | Manipur | Northeast Frontier Railway | Late 2025 | 24.8546607°N 93.7321332°E | |
| Trivandrum Port Tunnel | 9,020 metres (29,590 ft) | Vizhinjam International Seaport Thiruvananthapuram | Balaramapuram | Kerala | Southern Railway | Dec 2028 | Construction expected to begin in 2025 | |
| Tunnel T-10 | 5,300 metres (17,400 ft) | Melli | Rangpo | West Bengal | Northeast Frontier Railway | Dec 2027 | 27.062830°N 88.429373°E | |
| Kalijhora Tunnel (T-13) | 2,560.5 metres (8,401 ft) | Kalijhora railway station | Suntalay | West Bengal | Northeast Frontier Railway | Dec 2027 | 26.950914°N 88.444340°E | |

== See also ==
- Indian Railways
- List of tunnels
- List of longest tunnels
- Tunnel
