= List of railway stations in Jammu and Kashmir =

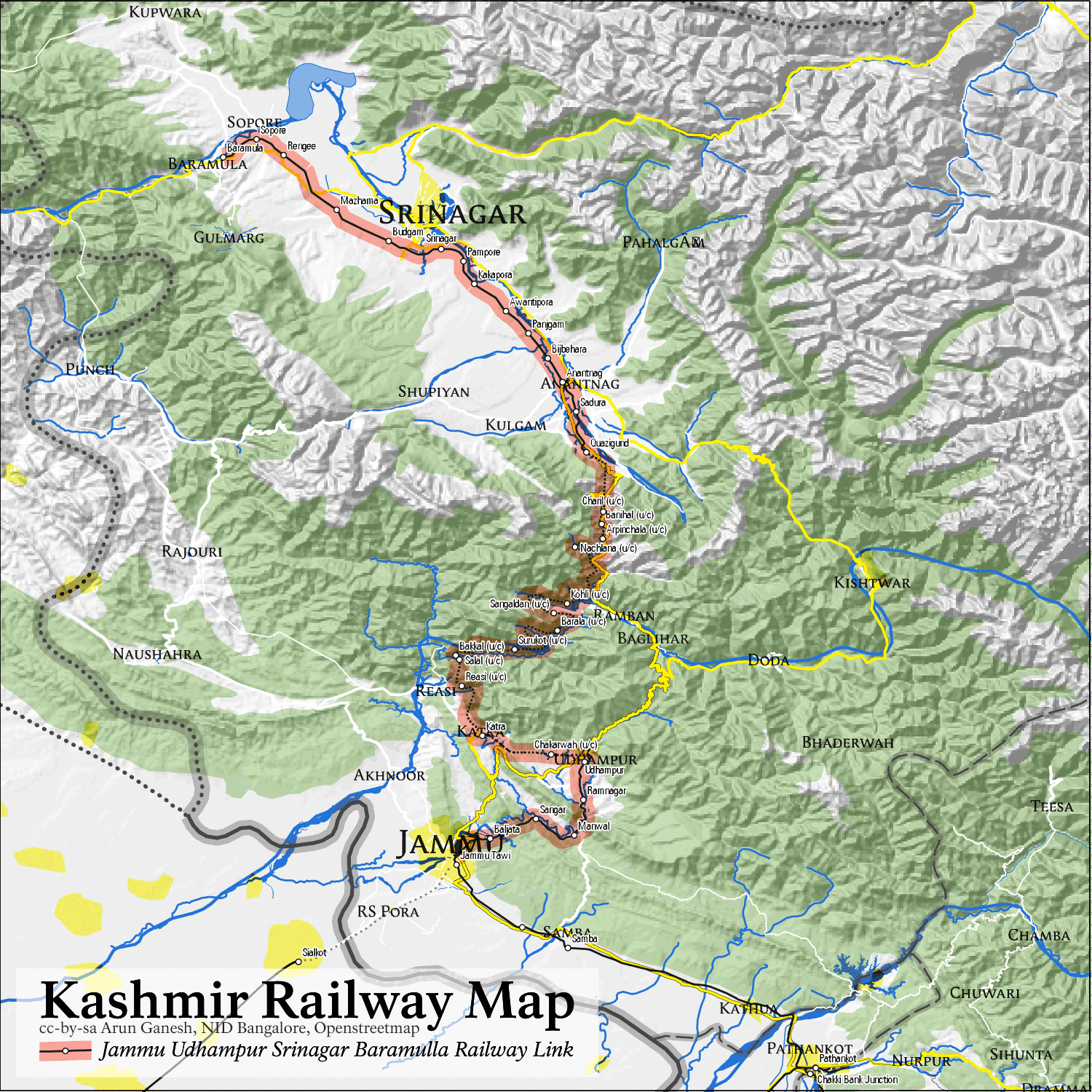
A map of the Jammu–Baramulla line

The railway stations in Jammu and Kashmir belongs to Jammu Division of Northern Railway Zone of Indian Railways. The list of railway stations in Jammu and Kashmir can be divided into 2 parts:

- Railway stations in Jammu Region
- Railway stations in Kashmir Region

== Jammu Region ==
Sl. No.	Station name	Platforms	Station code	Elevation
1	Kathua railway station	2	KTHU	393 metres (1,289 ft)
2	Budhi railway station	2	BDHY	361 metres (1,184 ft)
3	Chhan Arorian railway station	2	CHNR	390 metres (1,280 ft)
4	Chak Dayala railway station	2	CKDL	387 metres (1,270 ft)
5	Hira Nagar railway station	2	HRNR	381 metres (1,250 ft)
6	Ghagwal railway station	2	GHGL	373 metres (1,224 ft)
7	Samba railway station	2	SMBX	366 metres (1,201 ft)
8	Basantar Block Hut railway station	0	BHBT	357 metres (1,171 ft)
9	Vijaypur Jammu railway station	2	VJPJ	355 metres (1,165 ft)
10	Bari Brahman railway station	2	BBMN	335 metres (1,099 ft)
11	Jammu Tawi railway station	7	JAT	343 metres (1,125 ft)
12	Bajalta railway station	2	BLA	385 metres (1,263 ft)
13	Sangar railway station	1	SGRR	450 metres (1,480 ft)
14	Manwal railway station	1	MNVL	490 metres (1,610 ft)
15	Ram Nagar railway station	1	RMJK	596 metres (1,955 ft)
16	Udhampur railway station	3	UHP	660 metres (2,170 ft)
17	Chak Rakhwal railway station	2	CRWL	710 metres (2,330 ft)
18	Katra railway station	3	SVDK	813 metres (2,667 ft)
19	Reasi railway station	2	REAI	807 metres (2,648 ft)
20	Bakkal railway station	2	BAKK	867 metres (2,844 ft)
21	Dugga railway station	2	DUGA	938 metres (3,077 ft)
22	Sawalkote railway station	2	SWKE	1,036 metres (3,399 ft)
23	Sangaldan railway station	3	SGDN	1,232 metres (4,042 ft)
24	Sumber railway station	2	SMBR	1,417 metres (4,649 ft)
25	Khari railway station	2	KARI	1,560 metres (5,120 ft)
26	Banihal railway station	3	BAHL	1,705 metres (5,594 ft)

== Kashmir Region ==
Sl. NO	Station name	Platforms	Station code	Elevation
1	Hiller Shahabad railway station	1	HRSB	1,753 metres (5,751 ft)
2	Qazigund railway station	2	QG	1,722 metres (5,650 ft)
3	Sadura railway station	2	SDUA	1,633 metres (5,358 ft)
4	Anantnag railway station	2	ANT	1,592 metres (5,223 ft)
5	Bijbehara railway station	2	BJBA	1,599 metres (5,246 ft)
6	Panzgom railway station	2	PJGM	1,592 metres (5,223 ft)
7	Awantipura railway station	2	ATPA	1,589 metres (5,213 ft)
8	Kakapora railway station	2	KAPE	1,588 metres (5,210 ft)
9	Pampore railway station	2	PMPE	1,594 metres (5,230 ft)
10	Srinagar railway station	3	SINA	1,583 metres (5,194 ft)
11	Budgam railway station	3	BDGM	1,588 metres (5,210 ft)
12	Mazhom railway station	2	MZMA	1,587 metres (5,207 ft)
13	Pattan railway station	2	PTTN	1,580 metres (5,180 ft)
14	Hamre railway station	2	HME	1,579 metres (5,180 ft)
15	Sopore railway station	2	SXZM	1,594 metres (5,230 ft)
16	Baramulla railway station	2	BRML	1,577 metres (5,174 ft)

== See also ==
- Jammu–Baramulla line
