= Banihal–Baramula DEMU =

Overview
- Service type: DEMU
- First service: 9 July 2015; 9 years ago
- Current operator(s): Northern Railway zone

Route
- Termini: Banihal (BAHL); Baramulla (RML)
- Stops: 12
- Distance travelled: 135 km (84 mi)
- Average journey time: 2 hours 50 minutes
- Service frequency: Daily (Note: Runs seven days in a week for every direction.)
- Train number(s): 74615/74616, 74619/74620, 74625/74628, 74627/74628, 74629/74630

On-board services
- Seating arrangements: Yes
- Sleeping arrangements: No
- Catering facilities: No
- Entertainment facilities: No
- Baggage facilities: Below the seats

Technical
- Rolling stock: 2
- Track gauge: 1,676 mm (5 ft 6 in)
- Operating speed: 58 km/h (36 mph)

Banihal–Baramulla DEMU is a DEMU passenger train of the Indian Railways, which runs between Banihal railway station and Baramulla railway station, having 17 halts both within Jammu and Kashmir.

== Nomenclature ==
There are five sets of train currently being operated on daily basis. They are:

- 74615/74616 Banihal–Baramula DEMU
- 74619/74620 Banihal–Baramula DEMU
- 74625/74626 Banihal–Baramula DEMU
- 74627/74628 Banihal–Baramula DEMU
- 74629/74630 Banihal–Baramula DEMU

== Route and halts ==
The important halts of the train are:

- Banihal
- Hiller Shahabad
- Qazigund
- Sadura
- Anantnag
- Bijbehara
- Panzgom
- Awantipora
- Kakapora
- Pampore
- Srinagar
- Budgam
- Mazhom
- Pattan
- Hamre
- Sopore
- Baramulla

== Average speed and frequency ==
All sets of Banihal–Baramula DEMU runs with an average speed of 48 km/h and covers 135 km in 2 hrs 50 mins. While Baramula–Banihal DEMU runs with an average speed of 41 km/h and covers 135 km in 3 hrs 20 mins. There are 5 sets of trains which run on a daily basis.

== See also ==
- Srinagar railway station
- Budgam railway station
- Jammu–Baramulla line
