= Jammu Tawi–Srinagar Vande Bharat Express =

Mini Vande Bharat Express train route in India

Jammu Tawi – Srinagar Vande Bharat Express
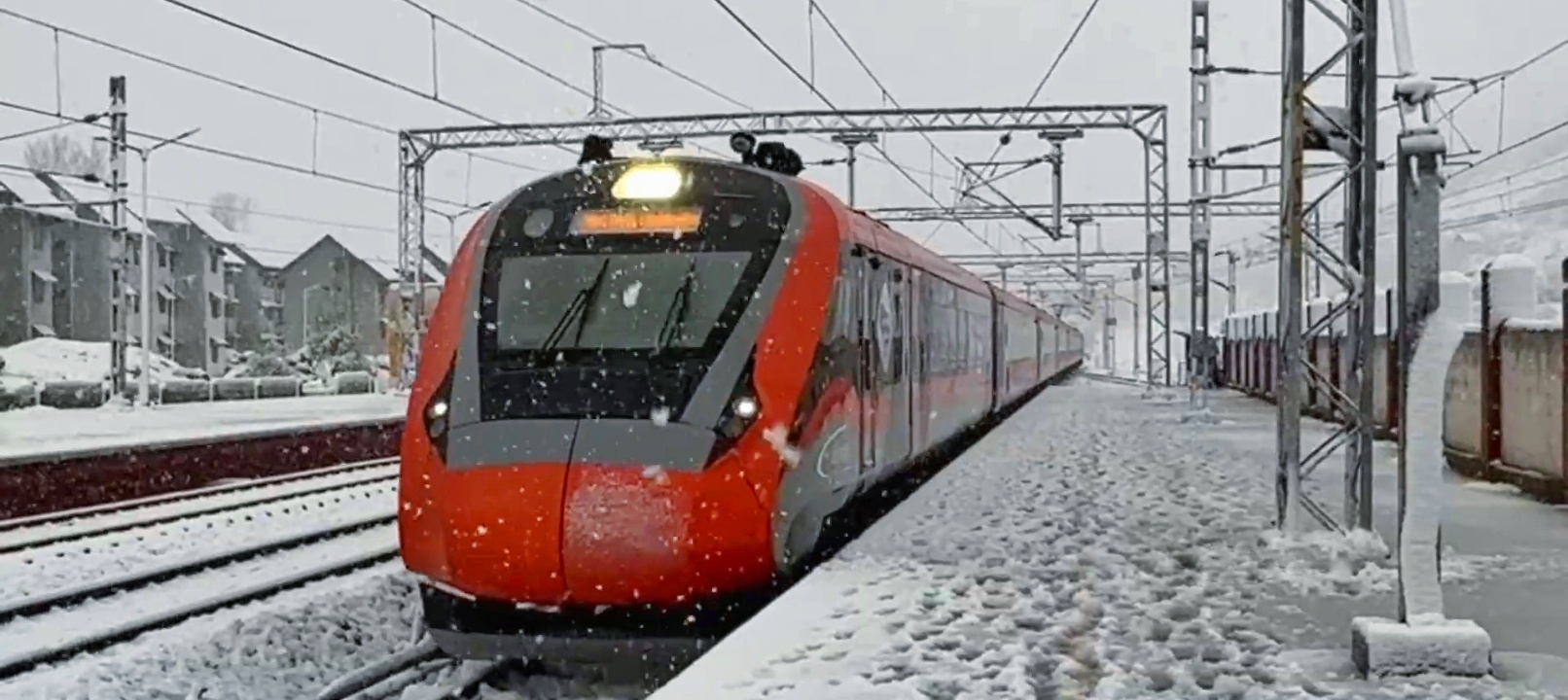
- Vande Bharat Express at Banihal railway station

Overview
- Service type: Vande Bharat Express
- Locale: Jammu and Kashmir
- First service: June 06 2025; 17 months ago (Inaugural); June 07 2025; 16 months ago (Commercial); April 30 2026; 6 months ago (Extension)
- Current operator: Northern Railways (NR)

Route
- Termini: Jammu Tawi (JAT); Srinagar (SINA)
- Stops: 4
- Distance travelled: 269 km (167 mi)
- Average journey time: 04 hrs 50 min
- Service frequency: Six days a week (Note: Except Tuesdays)
- Train number: 26401 / 26402
- Line used: Jammu–Baramulla line

On-board services
- Classes: AC Chair Car, AC Executive Chair Car
- Seating arrangements: Airline style; Rotatable seats
- Sleeping arrangements: No
- Catering facilities: On board Catering
- Observation facilities: Large windows in all coaches
- Entertainment facilities: On-board WiFi; Infotainment System; Electric outlets; Reading light; Seat Pockets; Bottle Holder; Tray Table
- Baggage facilities: Overhead racks
- Other facilities: Kavach, Advanced heating systems

Technical
- Rolling stock: Specially-Designed Mini Vande Bharat 2.0
- Track gauge: Indian gauge 1,676 mm (5 ft 6 in) broad gauge
- Electrification: 25 kV 50 Hz AC Overhead line
- Operating speed: 58 km/h (36 mph) (Avg.)
- Average length: 480 metres (1,570 ft) (20 coaches)
- Track owner: Indian Railways
- Rake maintenance: (TBC)

The 26401/26402 Jammu Tawi – Srinagar Vande Bharat Express is India's 68th Vande Bharat Express train, which connects Winter capital city of Jammu and the Vaishno Devi Temple in the Temple City of Katra with the Summer capital city of Srinagar in the Union Territory of Jammu and Kashmir, India.

This express train was inaugurated on June 6, 2025, by Prime Minister Narendra Modi from Katra between SMVD Katra to Srinagar in Jammu and Kashmir.

On 30 April 2026, the service was extended to Jammu Tawi, being its new originating station.

== Overview ==
This specially designed train is currently operated by Indian Railways, connecting Jammu Tawi, MCTM Udhampur, SMVD Katra, Reasi, Banihal and Srinagar. It currently operates on the newly completed Udhampur-Srinagar-Baramulla rail link, a 272-kilometer project designed to integrate the Kashmir Valley with India's railway network.

== Interesting facts ==
- This special express train traverses significant infrastructural landmarks, including the Chenab Rail Bridge—the world's highest railway bridge and the Banihal Tunnel, enhancing connectivity in the region.
- The introduction of this express train on this route will boost tourism, facilitate easier pilgrimages to the Mata Vaishno Devi shrine in Katra, and promote economic development in the Kashmir Valley by improving access and reducing travel time.

== Rakes ==
It is the sixty-third and the first specially designed 2nd Generation Vande Bharat 2.0 Express train which was designed and manufactured by the Integral Coach Factory at Perambur, Chennai under the Make in India Initiative.

The train has been upgraded to a 20-coach configuration. This indicates a permanent expansion from previous coach counts to accommodate higher passenger demands.

- This is equipped with climate-specific adaptations to provide advanced heating systems in sub-zero temperatures.
- The driver's front look-out glass is embedded with heating elements for defrosting and to ensure clear visibility during harsh winters.

== Service ==
The 26401/26402 Jammu Tawi – Srinagar Vande Bharat Express currently operates 6 days a week, covering a distance of 269 km (167 mi) in a travel time of 04 hrs 50 min with average speed of 58 km/h. The Maximum Permissible Speed (MPS) will be confirmed after commercial run.

== See also ==
- Vande Bharat Express
- Gatiman Express
- Udhampur-Srinagar-Baramulla rail link
- Jammu Tawi railway station
- Shri Mata Vaishno Devi Katra railway station
- Srinagar railway station
