= USBRL Tunnel 50 =

India's longest transportation tunnel

Overview
- Official name: T-50 Main NR Tunnel
- Other name: T-50
- Line: Udhampur-Srinagar-Baramulla Rail Link (USBRL)
- Location: Jammu and Kashmir, India

Operation
- Opened: February 2024
- Operator: Indian Railways

Technical
- Length: 12.775 km

USBRL Tunnel 50 (also known as T-50) is the longest transportation tunnel in India, with a length of 12.775 kilometers. It is located on the Udhampur-Srinagar-Baramulla Rail Link (USBRL) project, between the Sumber and Khari stations in the Union territory of Jammu and Kashmir. The tunnel was completed in February 2024 and is part of the Katra-Banihal section of the USBRL. The tunnel significantly enhances connectivity within Jammu and Kashmir and is a key component of India's efforts to improve transportation infrastructure in the region.

The tunnel was constructed using the New Austrian Tunneling Method (NATM) and was built by Afcons Infrastructure. It features modern safety systems, including escape tunnels, real-time monitoring, and emergency provisions.

== Relation to Tunnel 51 ==
Tunnel 50 and Tunnel 51 are two separate tunnels between Sumber and Khari stations. While they appear as a single continuous tunnel, they are actually separated by a false tunnel constructed over a 15-meter bridge spanning a stream. This false tunnel, designed to resemble the interior of a regular tunnel, makes the separation between T50 and T51 difficult to perceive. Tunnel 51, located at the Khari end, is 268.1 meters long and is connected to Tunnel 50 by the false tunnel, and part of the Khari station yard is located inside both tunnels. According to an official explanation, the false tunnel has a truss structure above it which was built primarily for protection against rockfalls in this section, ensuring the safety of trains passing over the bridge.

When considering the total length of Tunnel 50, Tunnel 51, and the approximately 15-meter-long false tunnel, the entire tunnel–bridge–tunnel structure spans over 13 kilometers, making it one of the longest such continuous sections on the USBRL route.
