= Bajalta railway station =

Railway station in Jammu and Kashmir, India

Bajalta

General information
- Location: Station Road, Bajalta, Jammu and Kashmir; India
- Coordinates: 32.7620°N 74.9521°E
- Elevation: 384 metres (1,260 ft)
- System: Regional rail and Light rail station
- Owner: Indian Railways
- Operator: Northern Railway zone
- Platforms: 2
- Tracks: 4
- Connections: Auto stand

Construction
- Structure type: Standard (on ground station)
- Parking: No
- Cycle facilities: No

Other information
- Status: Operational
- Station code: BLA
- Zone(s): Northern Railway zone
- Division(s): Jammu

History
- Electrified: 25 kV AC, 50 Hz OHLE
Location

Bajalta Railway Station is a small railway station in Jammu district, Jammu and Kashmir. Its code is BLA. It serves Bajalta city. The station consists of 2 platforms. The platform is not well sheltered, and lacks many facilities including water and sanitation.

== See also ==
- Jammu–Baramulla line
- Northern Railways
- List of railway stations in Jammu and Kashmir
