= Chak Rakhwal railway station =

Rail state in Jammu and Kashmir, India

Chak Rakhwal Railway Station

General information
- Location: Chak Rakhwal, Jammu and Kashmir; India
- Coordinates: 32.9419°N 75.0828°E
- Elevation: 448 metres (1,470 ft)
- System: Indian Railways station
- Owner: Indian Railways
- Operator: Northern Railway
- Line: Jammu–Baramulla line
- Platforms: 2
- Tracks: 3 1,676 mm (5 ft 6 in) broad gauge
- Connections: Auto stand

Construction
- Structure type: Standard (on ground station)
- Parking: No
- Cycle facilities: No

Other information
- Status: Functioning
- Station code: CRWL
- Zone(s): Northern Railway
- Division(s): Jammu

History
- Electrified: 25 kV AC, 50 Hz OHLE

Services
Preceding station	Indian Railways	Following station
Udhampur towards Jammu Tawi	Northern Railway zone Jammu–Baramulla line	Shri Mata Vaishno Devi Katra towards Baramulla
Route map
Location
- Location within Jammu and Kashmir Location within India

Chak Rakhwal Railway Station is a small railway station in Udhampur district, Jammu and Kashmir. Its code is CRWL. It serves Chak Rakhwal village. The station consists of two platforms. The platforms are not well sheltered. It lacks many facilities including water and sanitation.

== Major trains ==
Malwa Express SVDK-DADN(12920), DADN-SVDK(12919) have a halt here. Trains like Demu also have halt in CRWL.

=== Platforms ===
There are a total of 2 platforms and 3 tracks.

=== Station layout ===
G	Street level	Exit/Entrance & ticket counter
P1	FOB, Side platform, No-1 doors will open on the left/right
P1	Track 1
P1	Track 2
P1	Track 3
P1	FOB, Island platform, No- 2 doors will open on the left/right

== See also ==
- Banihal railway station
- Jammu–Baramulla line
- Northern Railways
- List of railway stations in Jammu and Kashmir
- Udhampur–Jammu highway
