= Anji Khad Bridge =

Railroad bridge in India

- Coordinates: 33°4′52″N 74°54′46″E
- Carries: Trains
- Crosses: Anji River, a tributary of Chenab River
- Locale: Reasi district, Jammu and Kashmir
- Owner: Indian Railways
- Maintained by: Indian Railways

Characteristics
- Design: Cable-stayed bridge
- Material: Steel
- Total length: 725.5 m (2,380 ft)
- Height: 331 m (1,086 ft)
- Longest span: 290 m (950 ft)
- No. of spans: 3

History
- Constructed by: Hindustan Construction Company
- Opened: 6 June 2025; 17 months ago

Location
- Interactive map of Anji Khad Bridge

The Anji Khad bridge is a railway bridge over the Anji River, a tributary of Chenab River, in the Indian union territory of Jammu and Kashmir. The bridge spans a length of 725.5 m (2,380 ft) with the 473.25 m (1,552.7 ft) long cable stayed bridge forming the main segment across the river gorge. With a height of 331 m (1,086 ft) from the river bed, it is the second-highest railway bridge in India, after the Chenab Rail Bridge, and India's first cable-stayed railway bridge. It is situated between Katra and Reasi stations on the Jammu–Baramulla line.

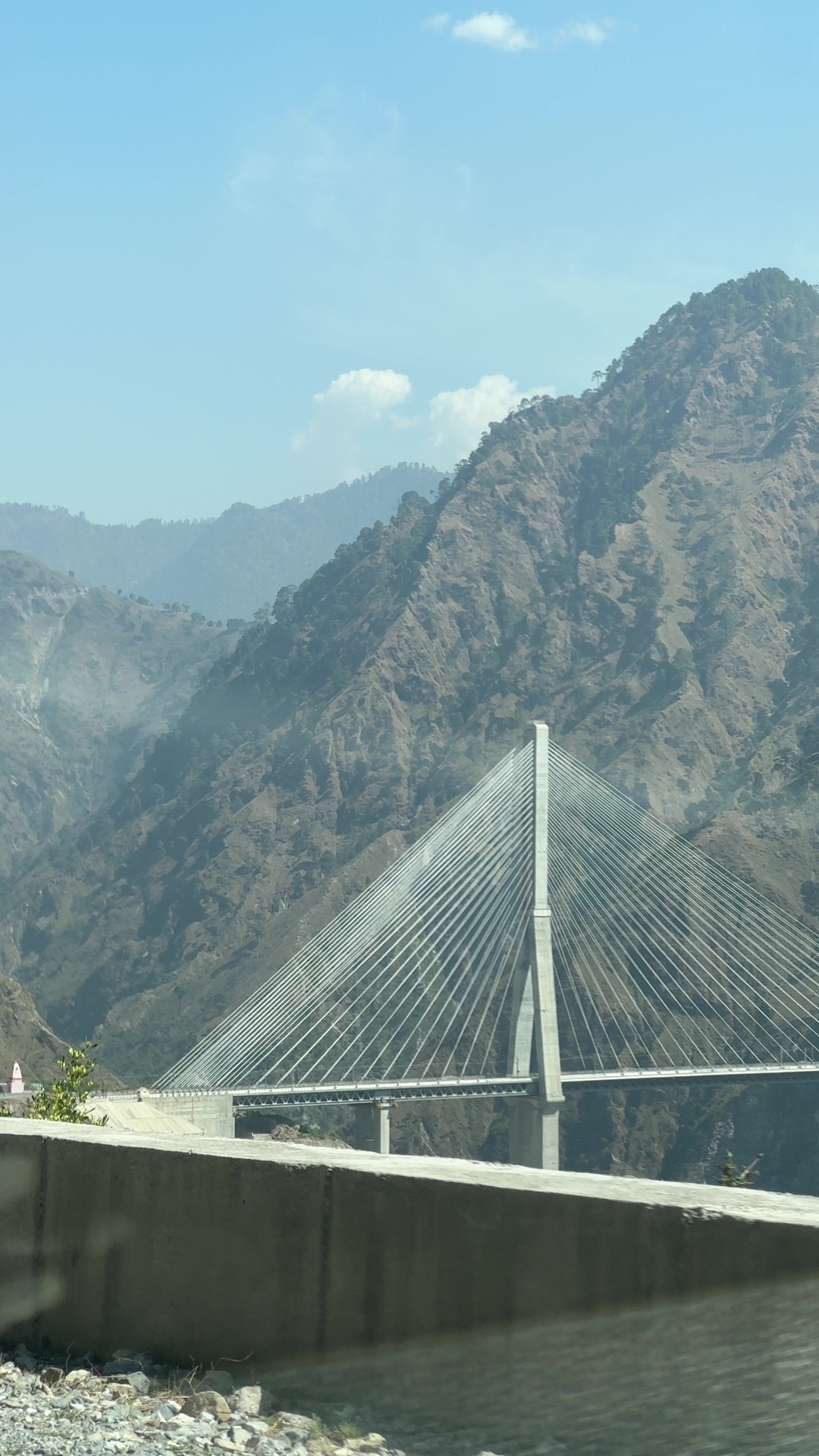
Anji Khad rail Bridge, Reasi

The cable-stayed bridge features an asymmetrical design with 96 steel cables anchored to a single 193 m (633 ft) high pylon. The bridge was constructed by Hindustan Construction Company. The construction began in 2017 and was completed in 2023. Trial runs were done in 2024, and the bridge was opened for regular traffic on 6 June 2025.

== Background and planning ==
In the late 1970s, the Government of India planned to establish a railway line to connect Jammu with the Kashmir Valley. The line would connect Kashmir with the rest of the Indian railway network and aid in the economic activity of the region. It would also serve as a strategic link to the Kashmir region throughout the year as the road is often cut off by snowfall during winters. Though the foundation stone for the project was laid in 1983, construction started only when the funds were allocated only in the mid-1990s. The Jammu–Udhampur section was opened in April 2005. Subsequently, a railway line was established between Baramulla and Banihal in Kashmir in phases from 2008 to 2013, and the planned Jammu-Baramulla line would extend beyond Srinagar to connect to the new line. The section between Udhampur and Katra was opened for traffic in July 2014.

Meanwhile, a survey was conducted in 1997 to study the feasibility for extending the railway line from Udhampur to Srinagar in the valley. The line would have to pass through the Pir Panjal range of the Himalayas, which necessitated multiple tunnels and bridges. The line between Katra and Srinagar necessitated crossing of deep gorges formed by the Chenab River and its tributaries. The Anji Khad Bridge was proposed over the Anji river, about 23 km north of Katra, towards and Reasi. The bridge was initially proposed as an arch bridge with a total length of 473 m (1,552 ft), a main arch span of 265 m (869 ft), and a deck height of 189 m (620 ft). However, an Indian Railways committee recommended against the design citing the unstable geology of the location and the steepness of the gorge. In October 2016, the Indian Railways decided to proceed with a cable-stayed bridge.

== Design ==
The plan consisted of a 725.5 m (2,380 ft) long bridge, which consisted of four segments. The bridge consists of a 38 m (125 ft) long approach viaduct on the Katra side, the 473.25 m (1,552.7 ft) main segment spanning across the river gorge, and a 120 m (390 ft) viaduct on the Reasi side. The main cable stayed segment is connected to the viaduct with a 94.25 m (309.2 ft) long embankment. The cable stayed segment is situated 331 m (1,086 ft) above the river bed and features an asymmetrical design with the bridge supported by 96 cables anchored to a single 193 m (633 ft) high pylon on the Reasi side. The cables are of varying lengths, ranging from 82 m (269 ft) to 295 m (968 ft).

The bridge is designed to carry a railway line, with an additional 3.75 m (12.3 ft) wide service lane and 1.5 m (4 ft 11 in) wide footpaths on both sides. The bridge is located in a seismically active zone, and is incorporates multiple sensors that continuously monitor the structural health of the bridge. The bridge has been designed to handle train speeds of up to 100 km/h (62 mph), and windspeed of up to 213 km/h (132 mph).

== Construction and opening ==
The cost of the project was estimated at ₹4.58 billion (US$49 million). Hindustan Construction Company was awarded the construction contract and the construction work began in 2017, with the work scheduled to be completed in 36 months. The design and construction is compliant with various national and global standards and codes. Stability and seismic analysis analysis were done by IIT Delhi and IIT Roorkee. The construction was supervised by Italian company ITALFERR, part of the Ferrovie dello Stato Italiane group and proofing was done by the British company COWI.

The construction involved stabilization of the mountain slopes surrounding the river gorge to ensure adequate support for the main pylon. The project used DOKA's climbing formwork system, a modern method of concrete forming. A 40-tonne tower crane, capable of extension to 205 m (673 ft), was imported from Spain for the project. In March 2021, the construction of the pylon was completed. In April 2023, all the cables were installed, with track laying and minor works expected to be completed in the subsequent months. In August 2023, trial runs began on the bridge. On 6 June 2025, the bridge was opened for regular traffic after prime minister Narendra Modi inaugurated a regular train service between Katra and Srinagar.

== See also ==
- Chenab Bridge
