= Bijbehara railway station =

Railway station in Bijbehara, Anantnag, J&K

Bijbehara

General information
- Location: Bijbehara, Jammu and Kashmir
- Coordinates: 33.7895°N 75.0756°E
- Elevation: 1,599.536 m (5,247.82 ft)
- System: Indian Railways station
- Line: Northern Railway
- Platforms: 2
- Tracks: 3

Construction
- Structure type: Standard on-ground station
- Parking: Yes

Other information
- Station code: BJBA
- Zone(s): Northern Railway
- Division(s): Jammu

History
- Opened: 2008; 18 years ago
Location
- Location within India Location within Jammu and Kashmir

Bijbiara Railway Station is a railway station on the Northern Railway network in Anantnag, Jammu and Kashmir. It is the twelfth station on the railway line about 93 km (58 mi) from Baramulla railway station. It is 3 km (1.9 mi) away from the main town.

== History ==
The station has been built as part of the Jammu–Baramulla line megaproject, intending to link the Kashmir Valley with Jammu Tawi and the rest of the Indian rail network.

== Location ==
The station is located near Hassanpora in Anantnag district.

== Reduced level ==
The station is situated at an elevation (RL) of 1594 m above mean sea level.

== Division ==
The railway station lies in the Firozpur Cantonment division of Northern Railway.

== Design ==
The station features Kashmiri wood architecture, with an intended ambiance of a royal court which is designed to complement the local surroundings to the station. Station signage is predominantly in Urdu and English and Hindi. (Note: See Srinagar railway station and Jammu–Baramulla line for the design of all railway stations of Jammu–Baramulla line.)

== See also ==
- Srinagar railway station
- Anantnag railway station
