= Sangar railway station =

Railway station in India

Sangar Railway Station

General information
- Location: Sangar, Jammu district, Jammu and Kashmir; India
- Coordinates: 32.8047°N 75.0501°E
- Elevation: 448 metres (1,470 ft)
- System: Indian Railways station
- Owner: Indian Railways
- Operator: Northern Railway
- Platforms: 2
- Tracks: 4 (Construction – Electrification of Single BG)
- Connections: Auto stand

Construction
- Structure type: Standard (on ground station)
- Parking: No
- Cycle facilities: No
- Accessible: Yes

Other information
- Status: Functioning
- Station code: SGRR
- Zone(s): Northern Railway
- Division(s): Jammu

History
- Electrified: 25 kV AC, 50 Hz OHLE
Location

Sangar Railway Station is a small railway station in Jammu district, Jammu and Kashmir. Its code is SGRR. It serves Sangar city. The station consists of two platforms. The platforms are not well sheltered. It lacks many facilities including water and sanitation.

== Major trains ==
Some of the important trains that run from Sangar are:

- Udhampur – Jammu Tawi Passenger
- Pathankot – Udhampur DMU
- Katra – Jammu Tawi DMU

== See also ==
- Jammu–Baramulla line
- Northern Railways
- List of railway stations in Jammu and Kashmir
