= USBRL Tunnel 44 =

Railway tunnel in Jammu and Kashmir, India

Overview
- Line: Jammu-Baramulla line
- Location: Jammu and Kashmir
- Status: Opened

Operation
- Owner: Indian Railways
- Operator: Indian Railways
- Traffic: Train

Technical
- Line length: 11.13 km (6.92 mi)
- No. of tracks: single track
- Track gauge: 1,676mm (Broad gauge)

USBRL Tunnel 44 is the third longest rail tunnel in India at 11.13 km. The tunnel lies between Katra-Banihal section of Udhampur-Srinagar-Baramulla Rail Link (USBRL) near Sangaldan town of middle Himalayas in Jammu and Kashmir. Trial runs were conducted in June 2024.

== Construction Challenges ==
The tunnel passes through strata of poor geology, consisting of Muree formation.

== See also ==
- Jammu–Baramulla line
- Pir Panjal Railway Tunnel
- List of rail tunnels in India by length
