= Panchgam =

Village in Jammu and Kashmir, India

Panchgam, also known as Panchgram, is a village in Pulwama district of Jammu and Kashmir, India. The village became notable after the construction of Panchgam railway station which provides easy access for the people not only living in this village but also to those living in vicinity of Panchgam.

== See also ==
- Srinagar railway station
