= MXW =

MXW may refer to:

- Mahadevsal railway station, the station code MXW
- Mandalgovi Airport, the IATA code MXW
- mxw, the ISO 639-3 code for Namo language
- FIM Women's Motocross World Championship, a women-only motocross championship
