= Bakkal railway station =

Railway station in Jammu and Kashmir

Bakkal

General information
- Location: Bakkal, Reasi district, Jammu and Kashmir, India
- Coordinates: 33.1431429°N 74.8943497°E
- Elevation: 867.167 metres (2,845.04 ft)
- System: Indian Railways station
- Owner: Indian Railways
- Operator: Northern Railway zone
- Line: Jammu–Baramulla line
- Platforms: 2
- Tracks: 2

Construction
- Structure type: Standard (on-ground station)

Other information
- Status: Commissioned
- Station code: BAKK
- Zone(s): Northern Railway
- Division(s): Jammu

History
- Opened: Expected February 2025
- Electrified: Yes (25 kV AC)

Services
Preceding station	Indian Railways	Following station
Reasi towards Jammu Tawi	Northern Railway zone Jammu-Baramulla line	Dugga towards Baramulla
Route map
Location

Bakkal railway station is a railway station in Reasi district, Jammu and Kashmir, India. It is part of the Jammu–Baramulla line and was commissioned in January 2025 as part of the Udhampur-Srinagar-Baramulla Rail Link (USBRL) project, with train services expected to begin in February 2025 following formal inauguration.

== History ==
The station was constructed as part of the USBRL project, sanctioned in 1994-95 and declared a national project in 2002. Located near the Chenab Bridge, Bakkal received CRS approval on 14 January 2025 after inspections on 6-7 January 2025, with a Vande Bharat Express trial run completed on 25 January 2025.

== Location ==
Bakkal railway station is situated in Bakkal, Reasi district, Jammu and Kashmir, India, along the Katra-Banihal section of the USBRL, just south of the Chenab Rail Bridge, the world’s highest railway bridge.

== Services ==
The station will be served by electrified trains on the Jammu–Baramulla line, including the Vande Bharat Express, with passenger services expected to start in late February 2025 post-inauguration.
