= Sawalkote railway station =

Railway station in Jammu and Kashmir

Sawalkote

General information
- Location: Sawalkote, Reasi district, Jammu and Kashmir, India
- Coordinates: 33.1701531°N 75.0390844°E
- Elevation: 1,036.356 metres (3,400.12 ft)
- System: Indian Railways station
- Owner: Indian Railways
- Operator: Northern Railway zone
- Line: Jammu–Baramulla line
- Platforms: 2
- Tracks: 2

Construction
- Structure type: Standard (on-ground station)

Other information
- Status: Commissioned
- Station code: SWKE
- Zone(s): Northern Railway
- Division(s): Jammu

History
- Opened: Expected February 2025
- Electrified: Yes (25 kV AC)

Services
| Preceding station | Indian Railways | Following station |
|---|---|---|
| Dugga towards Jammu Tawi | Northern Railway zone Jammu-Baramulla line | Sangaldan towards Baramulla |
Route map
Location

Sawalkote railway station is a railway station in Reasi district, Jammu and Kashmir, India. It is part of the Jammu–Baramulla line and was commissioned in January 2025 as part of the Udhampur-Srinagar-Baramulla Rail Link (USBRL) project, with train services expected to begin in February 2025 following formal inauguration.

== History ==
The station was constructed as part of the USBRL project, sanctioned in 1994-95 and declared a national project in 2002, aimed at connecting the Kashmir Valley with India's railway network. Located between Dugga and the Ramban district border, Sawalkote received CRS approval on 14 January 2025 after inspections on 6-7 January 2025, with a Vande Bharat Express trial run completed on 25 January 2025.

== Location ==
Sawalkote railway station is situated in Sawalkote, Reasi district, Jammu and Kashmir, India, along the Katra-Banihal section of the USBRL, east of the Chenab Rail Bridge.

== Services ==
The station will be served by electrified trains on the Jammu–Baramulla line, including the Vande Bharat Express, with passenger services expected to start in late February 2025 post-inauguration.
