= Sangaldan railway station =

Proposed railway station in Jammu and Kashmir, India

Sangaldan Railway Station

General information
- Location: Sangaldan, Ramban district, Jammu and Kashmir; India
- Coordinates: 33.2449°N 75.0874°E
- Elevation: 1,232.085 metres (4,042.27 ft)
- System: Indian Railways station
- Owner: Indian Railways
- Operator: Northern Railway
- Line: Jammu-Baramulla line
- Platforms: 3
- Tracks: 4

Construction
- Structure type: Standard (on-ground station)
- Parking: Yes
- Cycle facilities: Yes
- Accessible: Yes

Other information
- Status: Completed
- Station code: SGDN
- Zone(s): Northern Railway
- Division(s): Jammu

History
- Opened: 2024/02/20

Services
Preceding station	Indian Railways	Following station
Sawalkote towards Jammu Tawi	Northern Railway zone Jammu-Baramulla line	Sumber towards Baramulla
Route map
Location

Sangaldan Railway Station is a railway station in Ramban district, Jammu and Kashmir. Its code is SGDN. It serves Sangaldan block, Gool Sub-division and Ramban District. The station has three platforms. The station lies on Banihal–Katra line. The Work on this rail line upto Sangaldan has been completed in February 2024. The station in surrounded by many of long tunnels of Jammu–Baramulla line.

The station is part of the Jammu–Baramulla line, which once completed, will connect the city to the rail network of India. Currently, services are to Baramulla or Sangaldan. The railway line once fully completed is expected to increase tourism and travel to the Kashmir Valley. The work of last leg Chenab Bridge has also been completed in 2022.

The Sangaldan Railway Station was inaugurated by Honourable Prime Minister of India Narendra Modi through video conferencing on 20 Feb 2024.

This railway station plays an important role as it connects Udhampur to Srinagar railway station. Which helps in ease of transportation of goods and military equipment.
