= Sumber railway station =

Railway station in Jammu and Kashmir

Sumber

General information
- Location: Ramban district, Jammu and Kashmir, India
- Coordinates: 33.2983350°N 75.1168024°E
- Elevation: 1,417.599 metres (4,650.92 ft)
- System: Indian Railways station
- Owner: Indian Railways
- Operator: Northern Railway zone
- Line: Jammu–Baramulla line
- Platforms: 2
- Tracks: 2

Construction
- Structure type: Standard (on-ground station)

Other information
- Status: Operational
- Station code: SMBR
- Zone(s): Northern Railway
- Division(s): Jammu

History
- Opened: 20 February 2024
- Electrified: Yes (25 kV AC)

Services
Preceding station	Indian Railways	Following station
Sangaldan towards Jammu Tawi	Northern Railway zone Jammu-Baramulla line	Khari towards Baramulla
Route map
Location

Sumber railway station is a railway station in Ramban district, Jammu and Kashmir, India. It is part of the Jammu–Baramulla line and became operational on 20 February 2024 as part of the Udhampur-Srinagar-Baramulla Rail Link (USBRL) project’s Banihal-Sangaldan section.

== History ==
The station was constructed as part of the USBRL project, sanctioned in 1994-95 and declared a national project in 2002, aimed at connecting the Kashmir Valley with the rest of India’s railway network. The Banihal-Sangaldan section, including Sumber, was completed and electrified, with train services starting in February 2024.

== Location ==
Sumber railway station is located in Ramban district, Jammu and Kashmir, India, along the Banihal-Sangaldan section of the USBRL.

== Services ==
The station is served by electrified trains on the Jammu–Baramulla line, including passenger services introduced after the section’s opening.
