= Hira Nagar railway station =

Railway station in Jammu and Kashmir, India

General information
- Location: Hiranagar, Jammu and Kashmir; India
- Elevation: 381 metres (1,250 ft)
- System: Indian Railways station
- Owner: Indian Railways
- Operator: Northern Railway
- Lines: Amritsar–Jammu main line; Jammu–Baramulla line
- Platforms: 2
- Tracks: 4
- Connections: 1

Construction
- Structure type: Standard (on-ground station)
- Parking: yes
- Cycle facilities: yes

Other information
- Status: Construction – gauge conversion
- Station code: HRNR
- Zone(s): Northern Railway
- Division(s): Firozpur
Location

Hira Nagar railway station is a small railway station in Kathua district, Jammu and Kashmir, India. Its code is HRNR. It serves Hiranagar town. The station consists of 4 platforms. The platform is not well sheltered. It lacks many facilities including water and sanitation.
