= Reasi railway station =

Railway Station

General information
- Location: Reasi district, Jammu and Kashmir; India
- Elevation: 807.825 metres (2,650.34 ft)
- System: Indian Railways station
- Owner: Indian Railways
- Operator: Northern Railway
- Line: Jammu-Baramulla line
- Platforms: 2
- Tracks: 3

Construction
- Structure type: Standard (on-ground station)
- Parking: yes
- Cycle facilities: No

Other information
- Status: Active
- Station code: REAI
- Zone(s): Northern Railway
- Division(s): Jammu

History
- Opened: 2024

Services
Preceding station	Indian Railways	Following station
Shri Mata Vaishno Devi Katra towards Jammu Tawi	Northern Railway zone Jammu–Baramulla line	Bakkal towards Baramulla
Route map
Location

Reasi railway station is a railway station in Reasi district, Jammu and Kashmir. Its code is REAI. It will serve Reasi city. The station consists of two platform. The station lies on Jammu-Baramulla line. Reasi station is 17 km from Shri Mata Vaishno Devi Katra railway station. The railway line has been completed.

== See also ==
- Anji Khad Bridge
- Chenab Bridge
