= USBRL Tunnel 33 =

- Interactive map of USBRL Tunnel 33

Overview
- Location: Between Katra and Reasi, Jammu and Kashmir, India
- Coordinates: 33°0′20.48″N 74°55′2.53″E
- Status: Opened
- Route: Jammu-Baramulla line

Operation
- Constructed: Traditional tunneling methods, I-System of Tunneling
- Owner: Indian Railways
- Operator: Northern Railway
- Traffic: Railway

Technical
- Length: 3.209 km (1.994 mi)
- Operating speed: 85km/h

USBRL Tunnel 33, previously known as Tunnel 1, is a 3.209 km (1.994 mi) long railway tunnel located between Katra and Reasi in Jammu and Kashmir, India. It forms a critical part of the Udhampur-Srinagar-Baramulla Rail Link (USBRL) project, which aims to connect the Kashmir Valley with the Indian railway network. The tunnel is noted for its challenging construction due to complex geological conditions in the Himalayan terrain. It was fully completed in December 2024.

== Background ==
The USBRL project was sanctioned in 1994–95 and declared a national project in 2002. Spanning 272 km (169 mi) from Udhampur to Baramulla via Srinagar, the project includes 36 tunnels and 927 bridges. The 111 km (69 mi) Katra–Banihal section, which includes Tunnel 33, is executed by Northern Railway (5 km (3.1 mi)), Konkan Railway Corporation Ltd. (KRCL) (53 km (33 mi)), and IRCON (53 km (33 mi)). The project is designed to provide all-weather connectivity to the Kashmir Valley, reducing travel times and boosting tourism and trade.

== Construction ==
Construction of USBRL Tunnel 33 initially employed traditional tunneling methods but later adapted to the I-System of Tunneling to address the demanding geological environment. The tunnel traverses the lesser Himalayas, cutting through highly jointed and fractured dolomite and intersecting the Main Boundary Thrust (MBT), a major shear zone. These conditions presented significant challenges, including rugged terrain, water ingress, and mud influx.

A key milestone was achieved with an excavation breakthrough on December 20, 2023. However, progress was hampered in January 2024 by further water and mud influx. By May 2024, remaining tasks were still in progress as efforts continued toward completion.

== Completion ==
The final track work for USBRL Tunnel 33 was completed in December 2024, as reported by Daily Excelsior on December 16, 2024. This marked a pivotal achievement in the USBRL project, paving the way for improved regional connectivity and economic growth in Jammu and Kashmir.

== Impact ==
The completion of USBRL Tunnel 33, alongside the broader USBRL project, is expected to transform the region by providing all-weather connectivity to the Kashmir Valley. This will reduce travel times, enhance economic activities, and boost tourism and trade. The prospect of direct train services linking Kashmir with Delhi promises significant improvements in regional integration.

== See also ==
- Jammu-Baramulla line
- Katra, Jammu and Kashmir
- Reasi
