= Bajalta =

Place in Jammu and Kashmir, India

- Village
- Location in Jammu and Kashmir India Bajalta (India)
- Coordinates: 32.7585°N 74.9522°E
- Country: India
- Union Territory: Jammu and Kashmir
- District: Jammu

Languages
  - Official: Hindi, Dogri
- Time zone: UTC+5:30 (IST)
- PIN: 180017
- Website: jammu.nic.in

Bajalta is a village located, just 13 km from Jammu City in Jammu district in the union territory of the Jammu and Kashmir, India.
