= Martyr Captain Tushar Mahajan Udhampur railway station =

Railway station in Jammu and Kashmir, India

Martyr Captain Tushar Mahajan Udhampur Udhampur
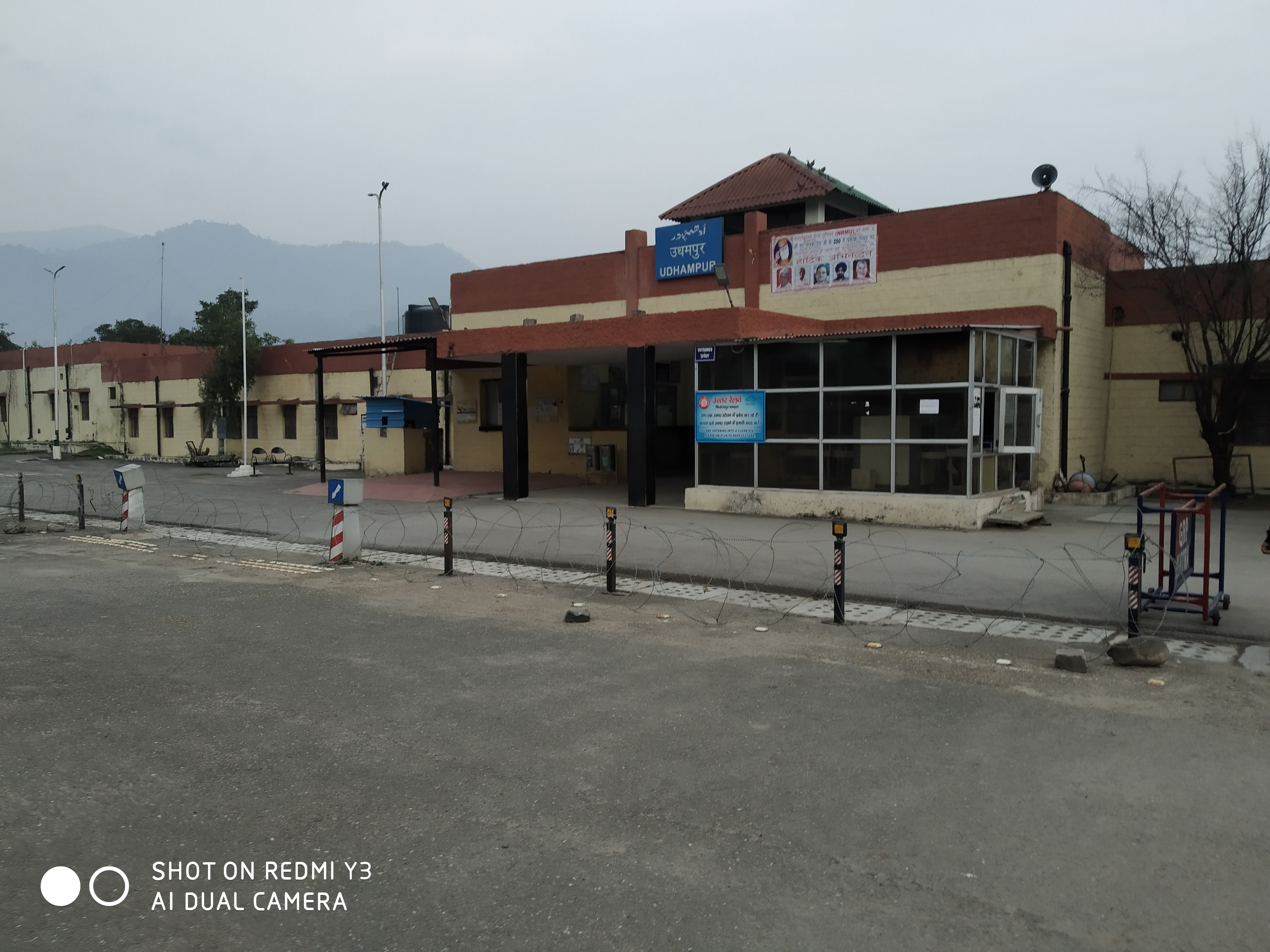

General information
- Location: Railway Rd, Bharat Nagar, Udhampur, Jammu and Kashmir182101; India
- Coordinates: 32.9263°N 75.1537°E
- Elevation: 660.054 metres (2,165.53 ft)
- System: Express train and Passenger train station
- Owner: Government of India (Under Ministry of Railways)
- Operator: Indian Railways
- Line: Jammu–Baramulla line
- Platforms: 3 + 2 under construction
- Tracks: 5

Construction
- Structure type: At grade
- Parking: Yes
- Accessible: Disabled access

Other information
- Status: Operational
- Station code: MCTM
- Zone(s): Northern Railway
- Division(s): Jammu

History
- Opened: 2005; 21 years ago
- Electrified: 25 kV AC, 50 Hz OHLE

Services
Preceding station	Indian Railways	Following station
Ram Nagar J&K towards ?	Northern Railway zone Jammu–Baramulla line	Chak Rakhwal towards ?
Location
- Location within Jammu and Kashmir

Martyr Captain Tushar Mahajan Udhampur railway station, also known as Udhampur railway station, is situated in municipal committee of Udhampur, Jammu and Kashmir, India. Its station code is MCTM. The average elevation of the station is 660.054 metres (2,165.53 ft) above mean sea level. The rail distance between MCTM and JAT is 53 km (33 mi). It is a 'A' class railway station in Jammu railway division of Northern Railway zone.

== History and overview ==
The Uttar Sampark Kranti Express train from New Delhi was the first train to run on this link in 2005. Commuter unreserved passenger trains (DEMU) linking Jammu and Udhampur (and Pathankot) also run on a daily basis and are quite popular.

The rail link to Katra was inaugurated and opened in 2014. Jammu Mail and Uttar Sampark Kranti Express have been extended to Shri Mata Vaishno Devi Katra railway station w.e.f September 2015.

As of now, 52 trains halt and originate/terminate at Udhampur.

In August 2023 Prime Minister Narendra Modi announced the redevelopment of the Udhampur railway station.

Udhampur Railway Station was renamed to Martyr Captain Tushar Mahajan Railway Station in September 2023.

In February 2024, Union Minister Jitendra Singh flagged off the maiden regular run of Vande Bharat Express train with stops at Udhampur and Kathua respectively.

== Platforms ==
There are a total of 3 platforms and 5 tracks. The platforms are connected by foot overbridge. These platforms are built to accommodate 24 coach express trains. The platforms are equipped with modern facilities like display board of arrival and departure of trains.

Udhampur railway station has a separate platform for receiving and unloading freight (goods) trains.

== Trains ==
Some important trains originate, terminate, and have halts here.

- Bhavnagar Terminus–Udhampur Janmabhoomi Express
- Prayagraj–Udhampur Superfast Express
- Kota–Udhampur Weekly Express
- Delhi Sarai Rohilla–Udhampur AC Superfast Express
- Jammu Tawi–Udhampur Passenger
- Jammu Tawi–Udhampur DEMU
- Pathankot Junction–Udhampur DEMU
- SMVD Katra–New Delhi Vande Bharat Express
- Subedarganj-MCTM Udhampur Express
- Hemkunt Express
- MCTM Udhampur-Durg Superfast Express

== Gallery ==
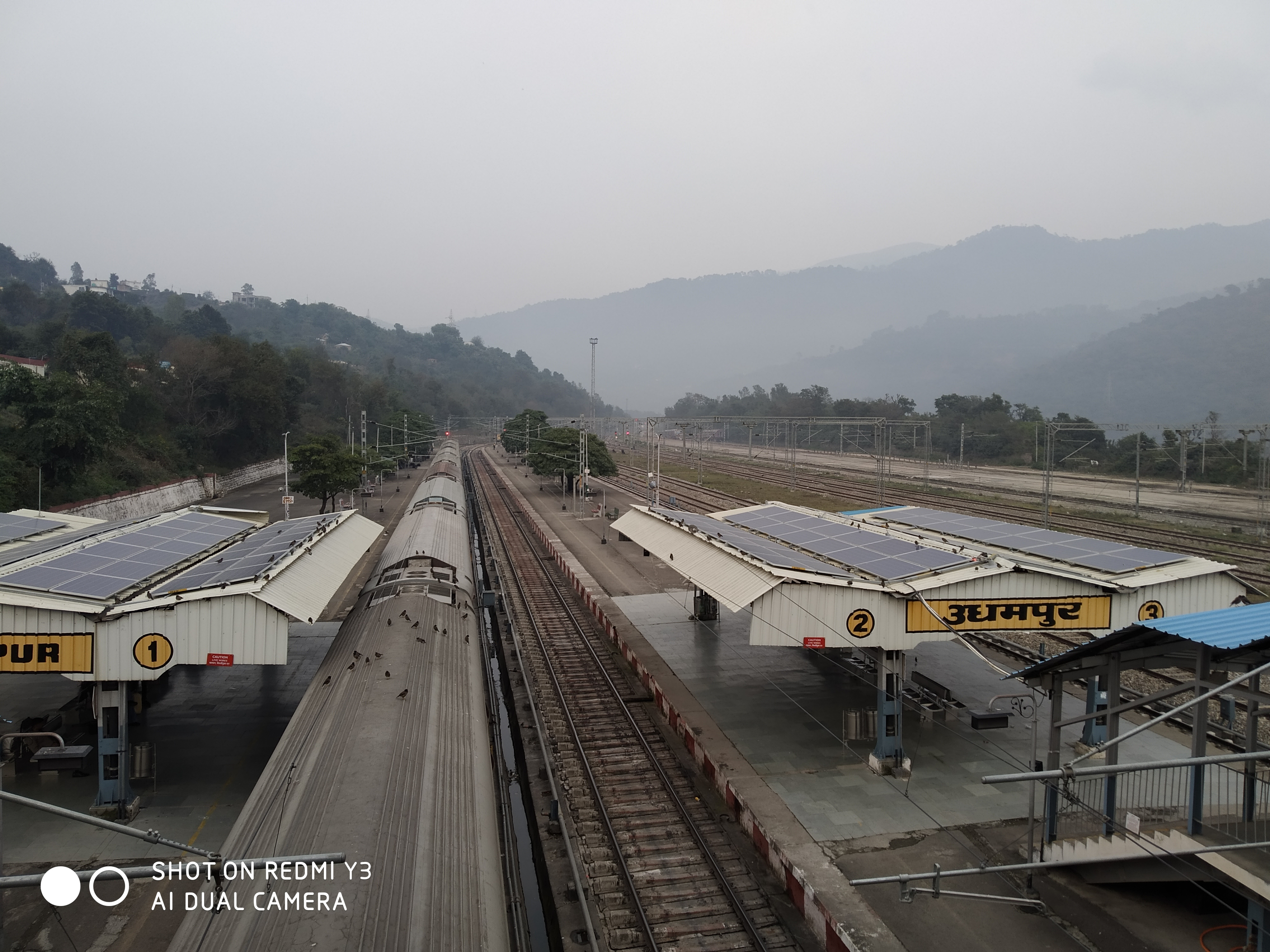
Udhampur railway st. platform

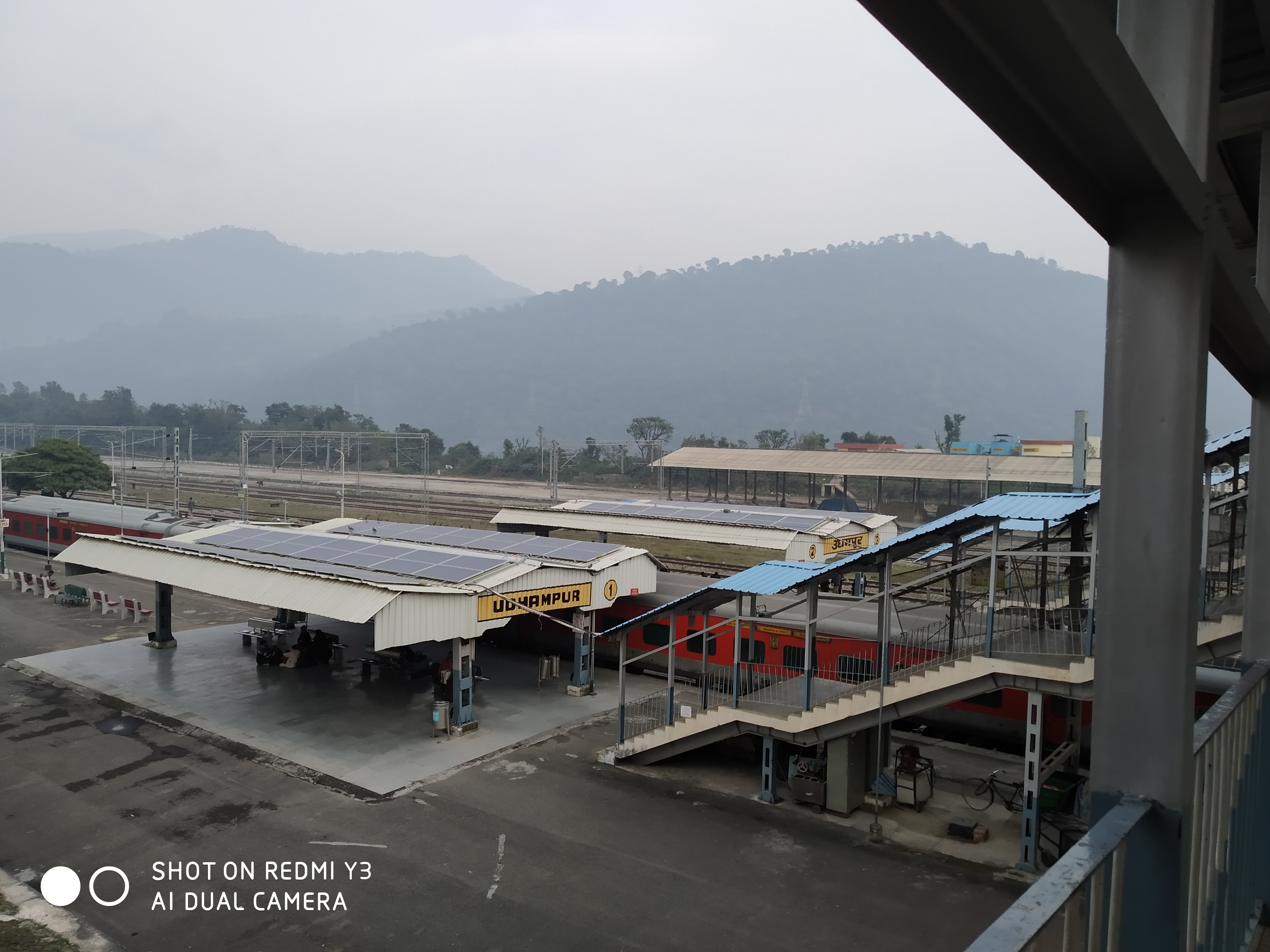
Udhampur railway st. platform

== See also ==
- Banihal railway station
- Jammu–Baramulla line
- Northern Railways
- List of railway stations in Jammu and Kashmir
- Udhampur–Jammu highway
