= Srinagar railway station =

Railway station in Srinagar, India

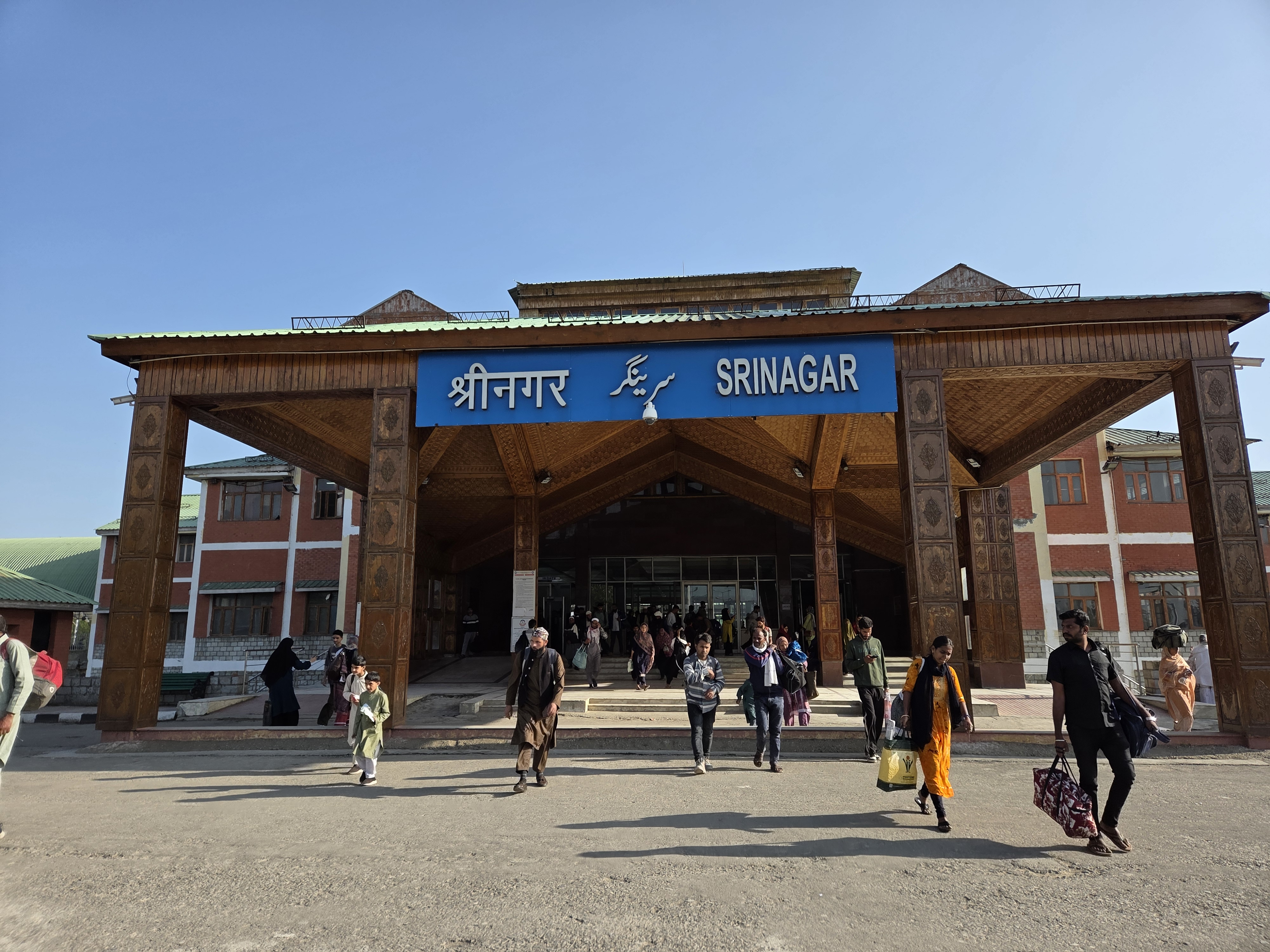
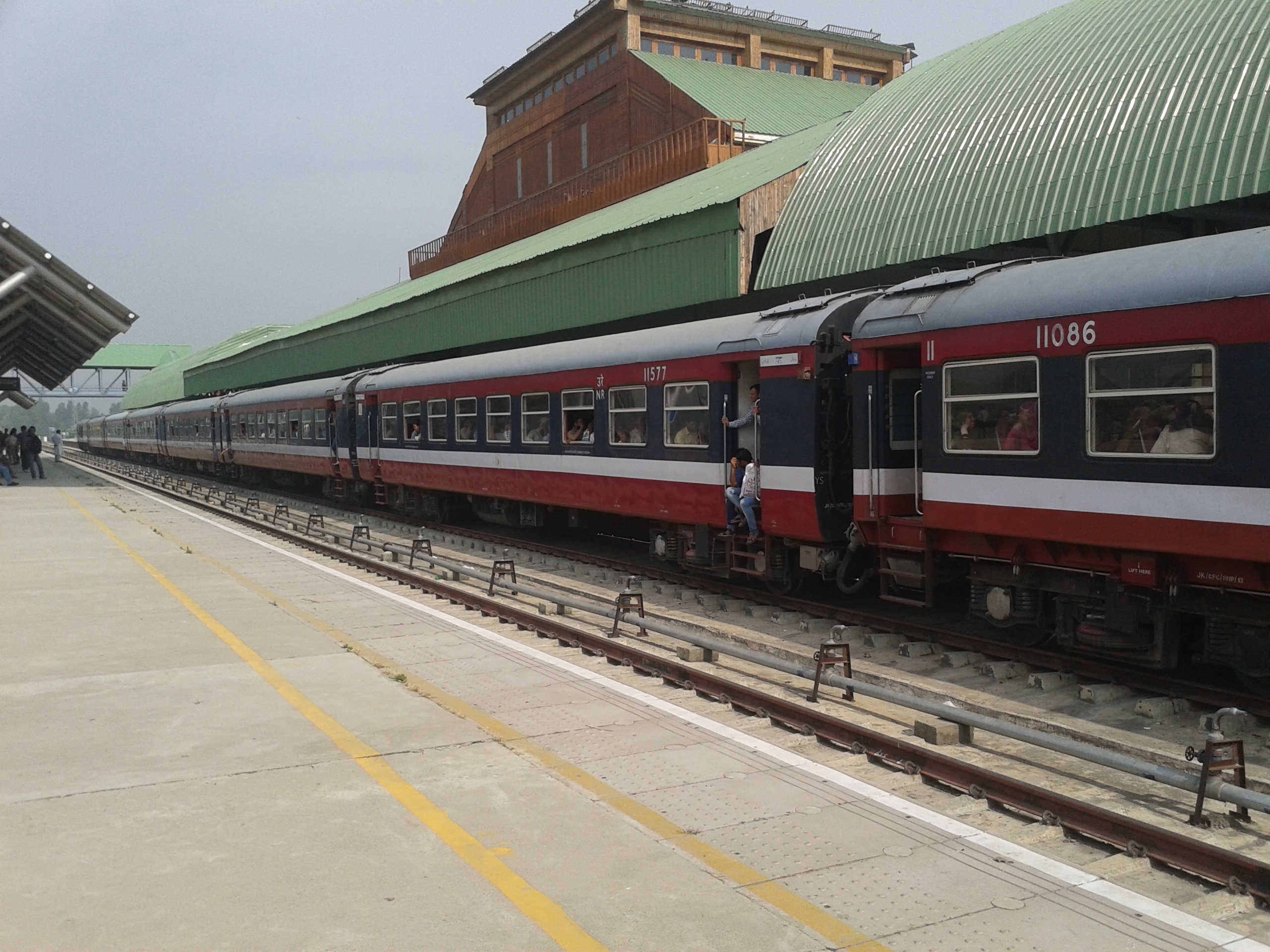
- Srinagar Railway Station

General information
- Location: Srinagar, Jammu and Kashmir; India
- Coordinates: 34.02355489244968°N 74.84712886729015°E
- Elevation: 1,591 m (5,220 ft)
- System: Indian Railways station
- Owner: Indian Railways
- Line: Jammu–Baramulla line
- Platforms: 3
- Tracks: 4

Construction
- Parking: Yes

Other information
- Status: Active
- Station code: SINA
- Zone(s): Northern Railway
- Division(s): Jammu

History
- Opened: 2008
Route map
Location
- Location within Jammu and Kashmir Location within India

Srinagar railway station is a railway station of the city of Srinagar in Jammu and Kashmir, India.

The station is part of the Jammu–Baramulla line and lies in the newly created Jammu division, which once completed, will connect the city to the rail network of India. Currently, services are to Baramulla and Banihal. The railway line has now fully completed is expected to increase tourism and travel to the Kashmir Valley.

The Chenab Bridge, between Sangaldan Railway Station and Reasi Railway Station.was completed in 2022.

The station is also planned to be part of a second railway line, the Srinagar–Kargil–Leh line.

== History ==
The station has been built as part of the Jammu–Baramulla line megaproject, intending to link the Kashmir Valley with Jammu division and the rest of the Indian railway network.

== Location ==
The station, in Nowgam, is 8 km from the city centre. The main hub of stations in Kashmir Is Budgam stations and where all trains are being repaired or any other services.

== Design ==
The station features Kashmiri wood architecture, with an intended ambiance of a royal court which is designed to complement the local surroundings to the station. Station signage is predominantly in Urdu, English and Hindi. The IRCTC intends to build a hotel in close proximity to the site.

== Gallery ==
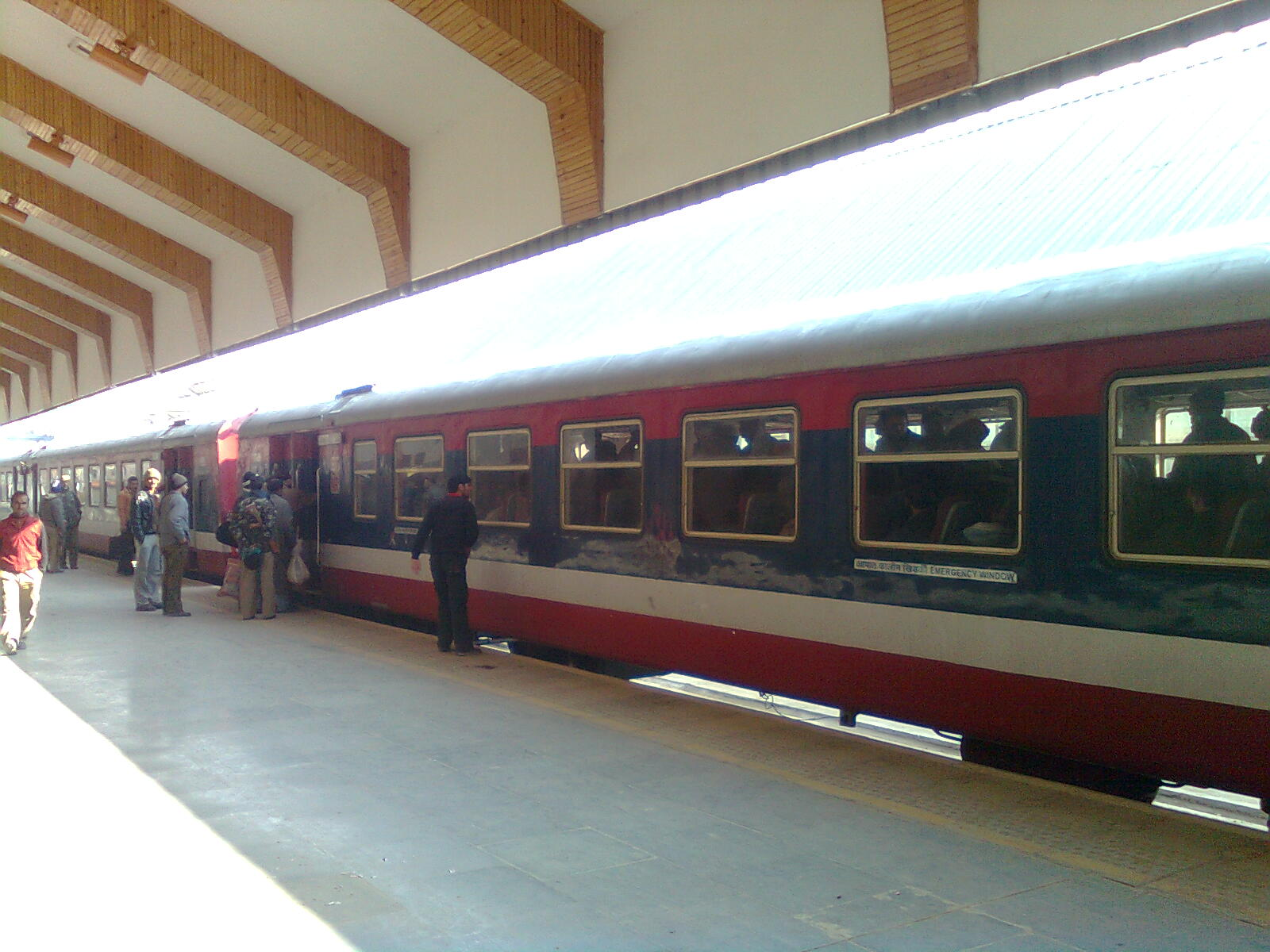
A passenger train at Srinagar Railway Station

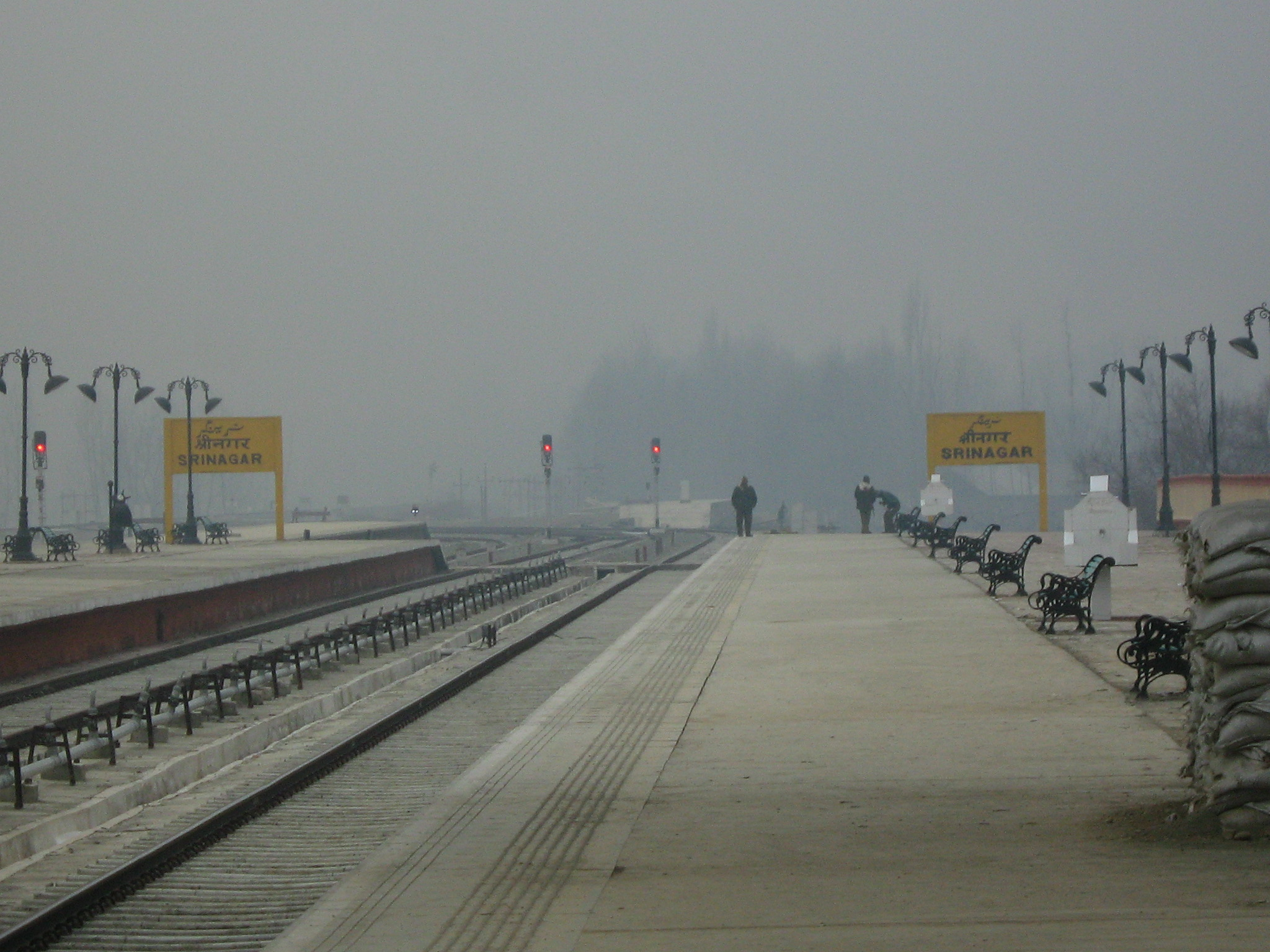

== See also ==
- Northern Railways
- Srinagar International Airport
- List of railway stations in Jammu and Kashmir
- Planned rail lines in J&K and Ladakh
