= Banihal railway station =

Railway station in Banihal, Jammu and Kashmir

Banihal
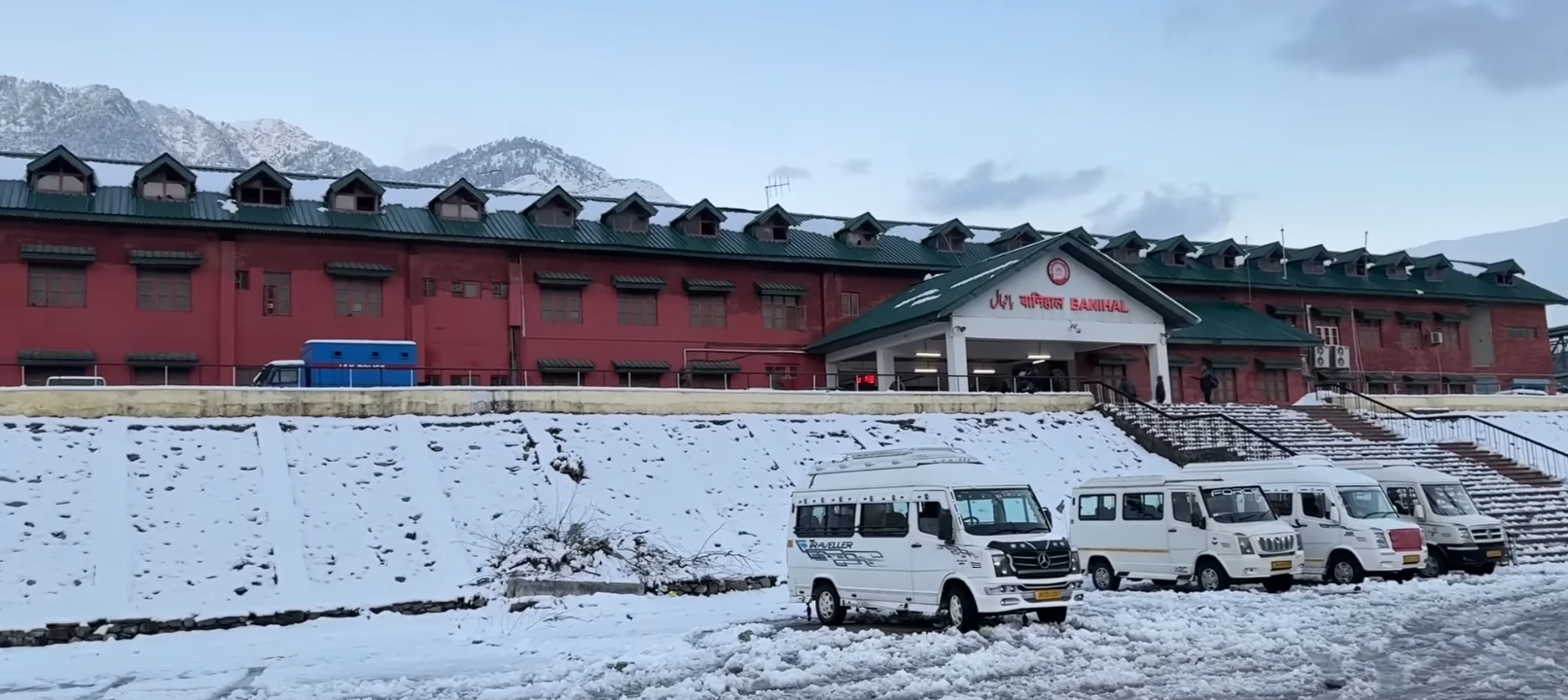
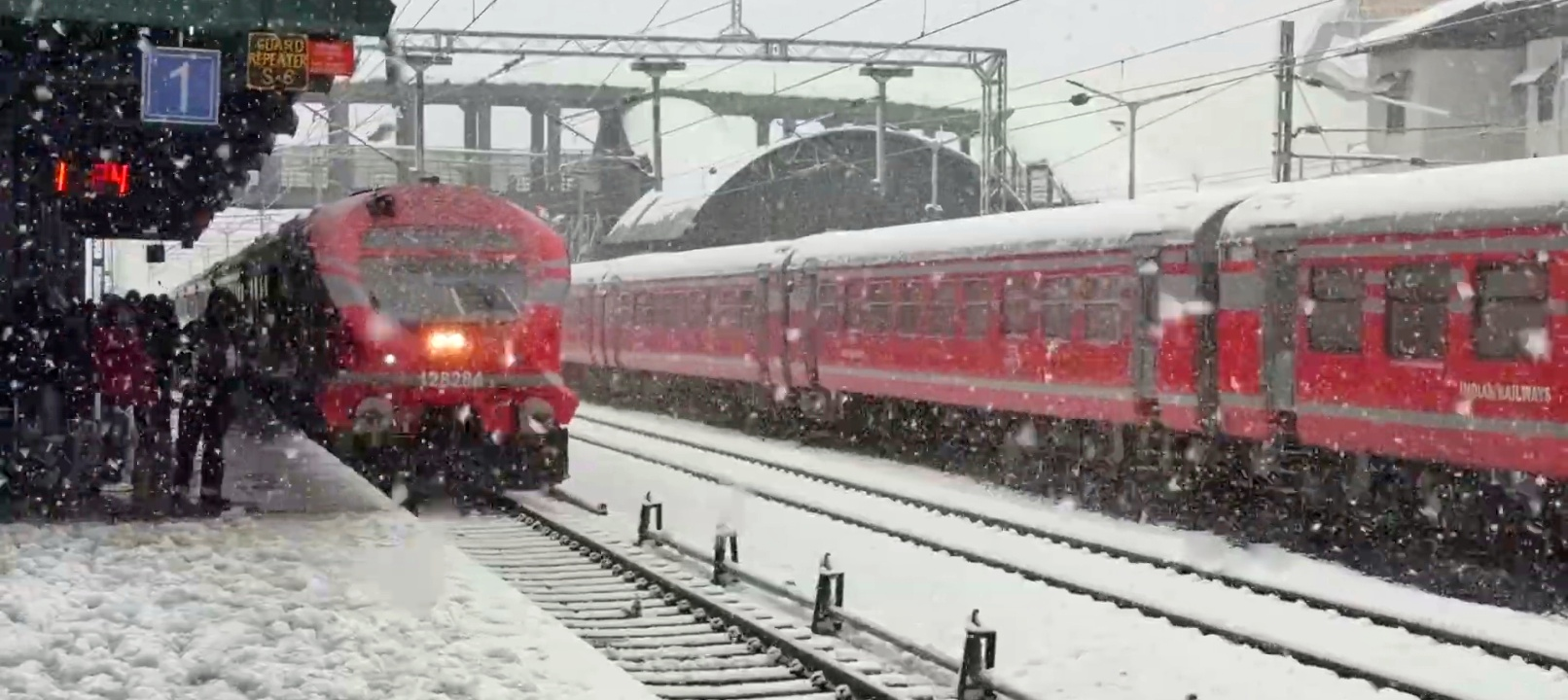
- Banihal Railway Station

General information
- Location: Banihal, Jammu, Jammu and Kashmir; India
- Coordinates: 33.4507°N 75.1892°E
- Elevation: 1,702 m (5,584 ft)
- System: Indian Railways station
- Owner: Indian Railways
- Line: Jammu–Baramulla line
- Platforms: 3
- Tracks: 4

Construction
- Parking: Yes

Other information
- Status: Functioning
- Station code: BAHL
- Zone(s): Northern Railway zone
- Division(s): Jammu

History
- Opened: 2013
Route map
Location

Banihal railway station (station code: BAHL), a part of Jammu–Baramulla line, is situated in Banihal in Ramban district, of JammuJammu and Kashmir on a run from Banihal to Qazigund. It was commissioned on 26 June 2013, inaugurated by former prime minister Manmohan Singh and UPA Chairperson Sonia Gandhi. The 12-minute ride went through Pir Panjal tunnel up to Qazigund with 100 students, mostly girls, of the Banihal Higher Secondary School, and made the 17.8-km ride back to Banihal, passing again through the tunnel, the second longest in Asia.

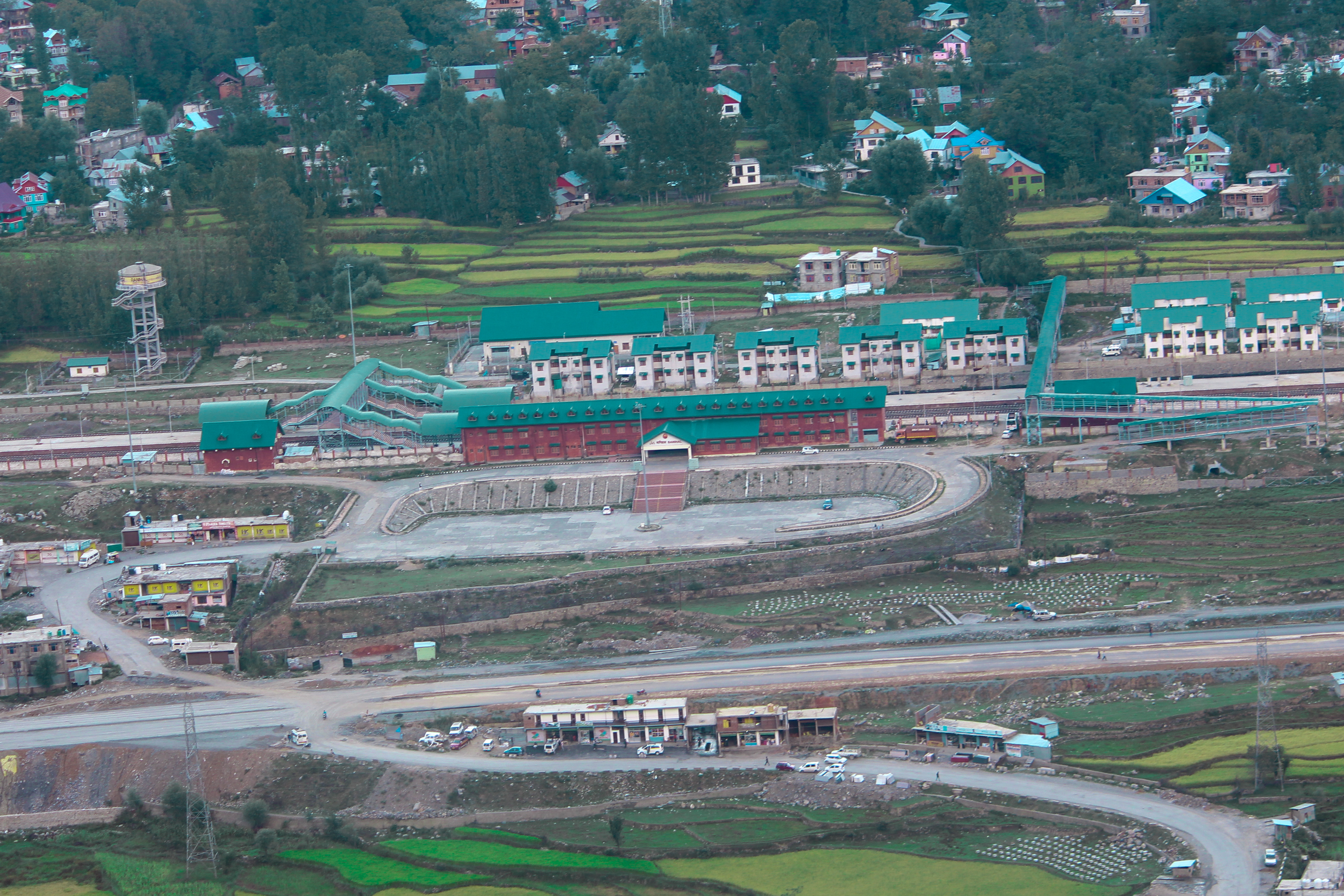
Banihal Railway Station Aerial View

== Background ==
The station has been built as part of the Jammu–Baramulla line megaproject, intending to link the Kashmir Valley with Jammu division and the Indian railway network.

== Services ==
The railway network in Kashmir from Banihal to Baramulla is now 137 km. Five trains run daily from Banihal to Baramulla. The services were paused for a prolonged period since 5 August 2019 after the Abrogation of Article 35A and at that period it were resumed only once for a special documentary shoot. However later the services were introduced from January 2020 onwards.

== Design ==
The RL of the station is 1,702 m (5,584 ft) above mean sea level. Like all the other stations in this megaproject, this station also features Kashmiri wood architecture, with an intended ambience of a royal court which is designed to complement the local surroundings to the station. Station signage is predominantly in Urdu, English and Hindi.

=== Platforms ===
There are a total of 3 platforms and 4 tracks. The platforms are connected by foot overbridge. These platforms are built to accumulate 24 coaches express train.

=== Station layout ===
G	Street level	Exit/Entrance & ticket counter
P1	FOB, Side platform, No-1 doors will open on the left/right
P1	Track 1
P1	Track 2
P1	Track 3
P1	FOB, Island platform, No- 2 doors will open on the left/right
P1	Track 4

== See also ==
- Srinagar railway station
- Udhampur railway station
- Anantnag railway station
- Shri Mata Vaishno Devi Katra railway station
- List of railway stations in India
