= Jammu railway division =

Railway division of India

Jammu Railway Division
Overview
- Operator: Indian Railways
- Headquarters: Jammu
- Locale: Jammu and Kashmir
- Dates of operation: 2025; 1 year ago–
- Predecessor: Northern Railway zone

Technical
- Length: 742.1 km (461.1 mi)

Other
- Website: nr.indianrailways.gov.in

Jammu railway division, headquartered at Jammu, is one of the six railway divisions under the jurisdiction of Northern Railway zone of the Indian Railways in India. The jurisdiction of Jammu railway division covers Jammu and Kashmir, Ladakh, part of Punjab and part of Himachal Pradesh.

== History ==
On 6 January 2025, the newly formed division was inaugurated by Prime Minister Narendra Modi, after carving it out of the Firozpur Division when it became 70th railway division in India. Vivek Kumar became its first Divisional Railway Manager (DRM).

== Rail lines ==
=== Existing ===
The division has a total of the following existing rail line network of 742.1 km (461.1 mi).

- Pathankot-Baramulla line (includes all of Jammu–Baramulla line and part of Jalandhar–Jammu line), via Pathankot–Jammu–Udhampur–Srinagar–Baramulla 423 km (263 mi), .
- Bhogpur Sirwal–Pathankot line 87.21 km (54.19 mi).
- Batala–Pathankot 68.17 km (42.36 mi), excluded Batala station itself.
- Kangra Valley Railway narrow gauge section, 163.72 km (101.73 mi) route km via Pathankot–Joginder Nagar.

=== Planned ===
New lines (listed north to south)

- Baramulla-Kupwara line (Sopore-Kupwara line): 39-km-long extension costing Rs 3843 crore from Baramulla to Kupwara was approved by the Central Government in Nov 2018. The survey was completed in 2009, and completed re-survey was submitted to the Railway Board in July 2020. Final Location Survey (FLS) was approved in December 2023. DPR was being prepared as of June 2025.

- Baramulla-Uri line: 50 km lone Railway extension from Baramulla to Uri will have one existing (Baramulla railway station) and several new stations (Sheeri, Gantmulla, Boniyar, Limber, Nougram, Lagama and Uri). Final Location Survey (FLS) was approved in December 2023. DPR was being prepared as of June 2025.

- Srinagar-Kargil-Leh line: on hold as of 2025 due to the present lack of financial feasibility, might be revived in future based on the improved financial feasibility.

- Awantipora-Shopian line: 27.6 kilometers: commencement of Final Location Survey (FLS) was approved in December 2023, which was underway as of June 2025.

- Anantnag-Bijbehara-Pahalgam line: 77.5 kilometers: commencement of Final Location Survey (FLS) was approved in December 2023, which was underway as of June 2025.

- Udhampur-Doda-Bhadarwah line: (via Doda), in 2011-12 survey was completed for 224 km Udhampur-Doda-Bhadarwah line including Doda-Kishtwar spur, with negative 5.3.4% rate of return on investment of ₹12,040 crore (2012 price), hence on hold.
  - Doda-Kishtwar line: survey done, on hold (see Udhampur-Doda-Bhadarwah line for the cause).

- Manwal-Talra line: (north of Kathua), 117 km, via Ramkote, Billawar, Basholi, and to Dunera (Himachal), survey completed and DPR was being prepared in June 2025.

- Jammu-Poonch line: 223 km, via Akhnoor and Rajouri, DPR was being prepared as of June 2025.

- Pathankot-Leh line: 664 km, DPR was being prepared as of June 2025.
- Bhanupli–Leh line: 498 km, DPR was being prepared as of June 2025.

High-speed rail

- Amritsar–Jammu high-speed rail corridor

Metro rail

- Srinagar Metro
- Jammu Metro

=== Major engineering marvels ===
- Anji Khad Bridge
- Chenab Rail Bridge
- Pir Panjal Railway Tunnel

== Railway stations ==
List of railway stations in Jammu railway division and their station category is as follows.

- List of railway stations in Jammu and Kashmir

Category of station	No. of stations	Names of stations
NSG-2	3	Jammu Tawi, Budgam, Srinagar
NSG-3	1	Pathankot Cantonment, Banihal
NSG-4	2	Pathankot Junction, Baramulla, Udhampur
NSG-5	-	-
NSG-6	-	-
HG1	-	-
HG2	-	-
HG3	-	-
Total	-	-

== See also ==
- Railways
  - Geostrategic border rail lines of India
  - Transport between India and Pakistan
  - Jammu–Sialkot line, defunct link to Pakistan
  - List of railway stations in Punjab
  - Rail transport in Haryana
- General
  - Aerial lift in India
  - Road transport in J&K
  - Transport in Himachal Pradesh
