= Baramulla railway station =

Railway station in Anantnag, J&K

Baramulla Railway Station

General information
- Location: Baramulla, Jammu and Kashmir; India
- Coordinates: 34.2208°N 74.3884°E
- Elevation: 1,582.79 m (5,192.9 ft)
- System: Indian Railways station
- Owner: Indian Railways
- Operator: Northern Railways
- Line: Jammu–Baramulla line
- Platforms: 2
- Tracks: 3

Construction
- Parking: Yes

Other information
- Status: Active
- Station code: BRML
- Zone(s): Northern Railway
- Division(s): Jammu

History
- Opened: 2008; 18 years ago
Location
- Location within Jammu and Kashmir Location within India

Baramulla Railway Station is situated in outskirts of baramulla town nearly about 5 km from main town. Transport facility is available in working hours from main town baramulla to railway station and vice versa. It is the first station of 130 km long railway line which connects Kashmir Valley with Banihal.

Baramulla is one of India's northernmost railway station. There are plans to connect Kupwara by rail by extending the Jammu–Baramulla Rail Line up to Kupwara.

== History ==
The station has been built as part of the Jammu–Baramulla line megaproject, aiming to link the Kashmir Valley with the rest of the Indian railway network. The Leg 2 section of this network is incomplete. It is expected to be completed by 2021.

== Reduced level ==
The station is situated at an elevation of 1582.79 metres above mean sea level.

== Design ==
Like every other station in this mega project, this station also features Kashmiri wood architecture, with an intended ambience of a royal court which is designed to complement the local surroundings to the station. Station signage is predominantly in Urdu, English and Hindi.

== See also ==
- Northern Railways
- Srinagar railway station
- Anantnag railway station
- List of railway stations in Jammu and Kashmir
