= Jammu–Baramulla line =

Railway line in northern India

Jammu–Baramulla line Udhampur-Srinagar-Baramula Rail Link (USBRL)
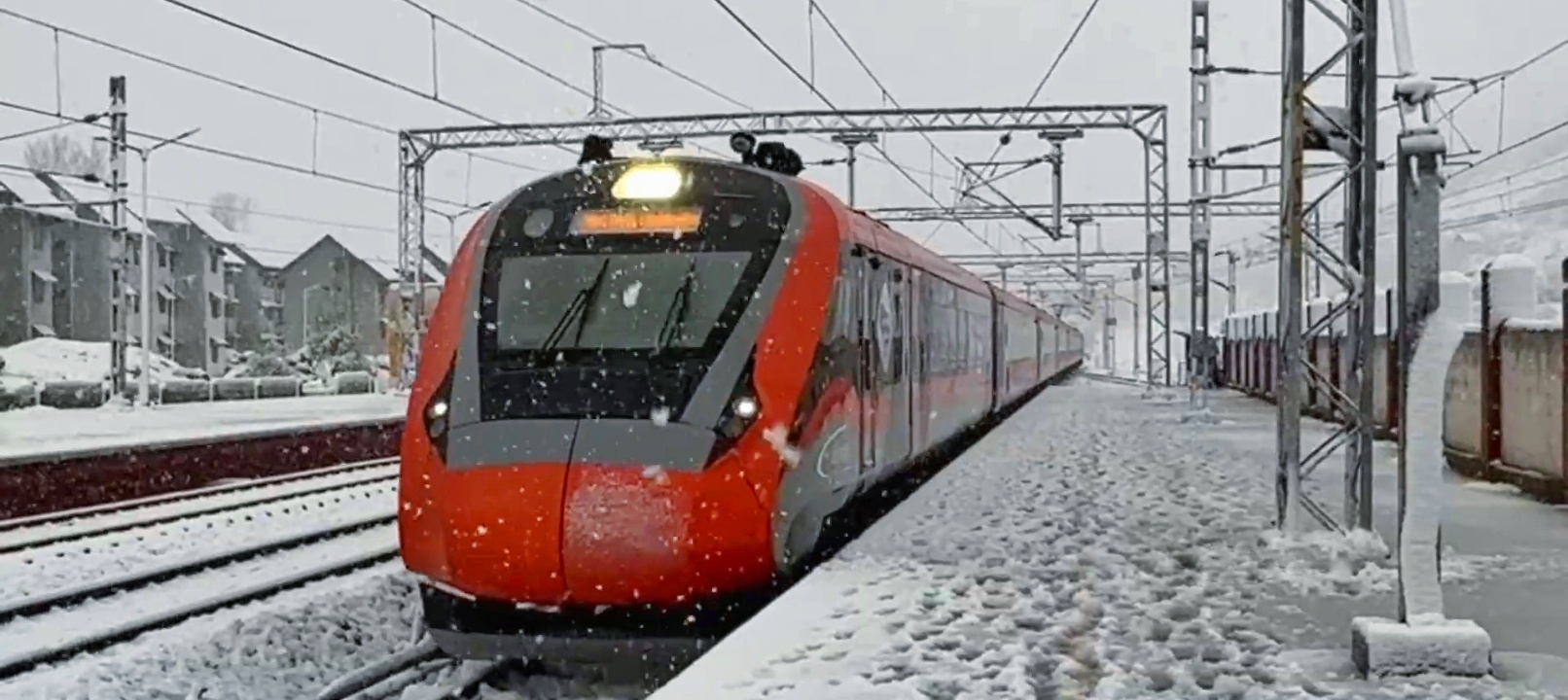
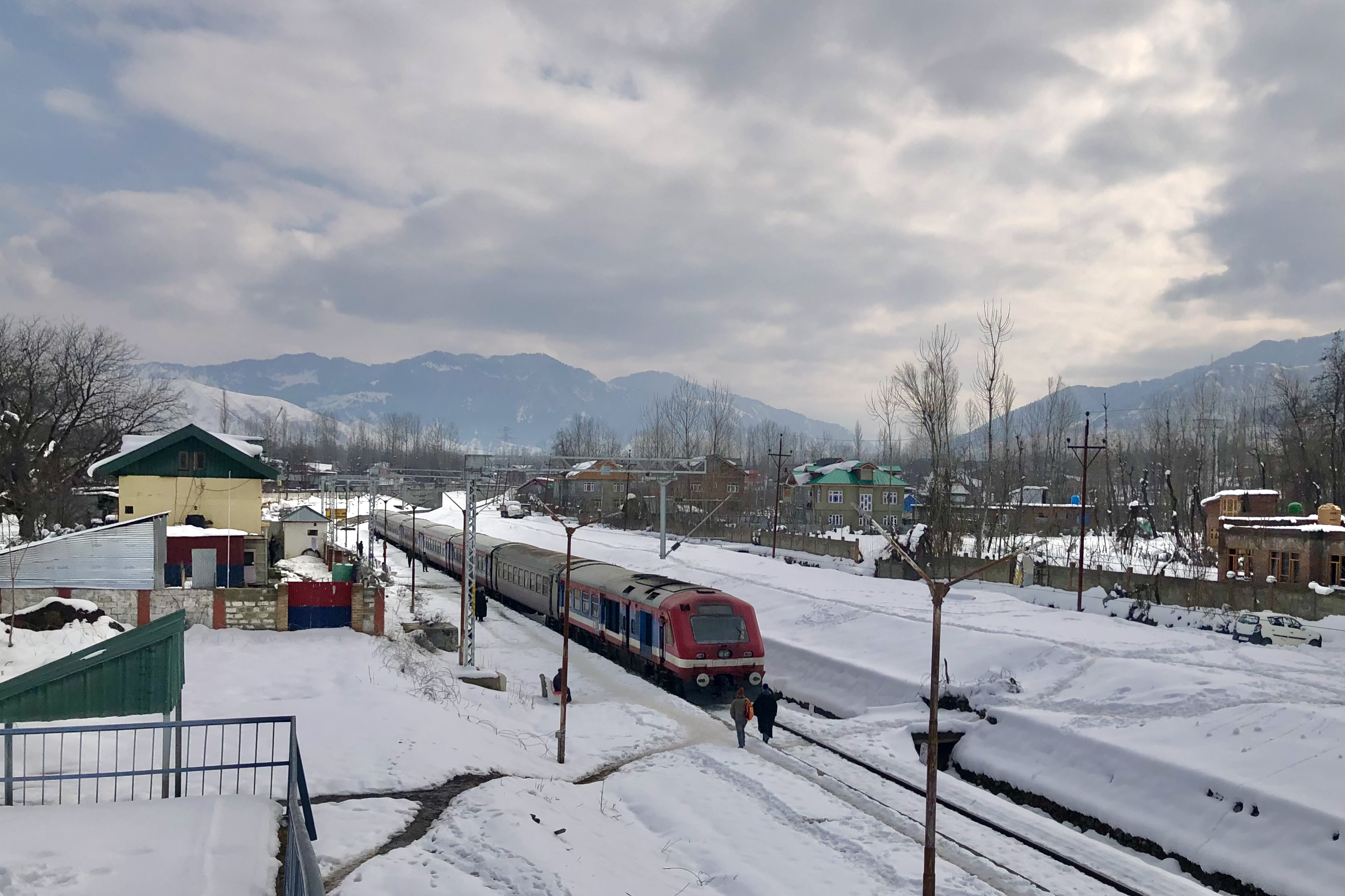
- Jammu Tawi–Srinagar Vande Bharat Express train at the Banihal railway station in the Jammu region An Indian railways DEMU train near Qazigund in the Kashmir Valley

Overview
- Owner: Indian Railways
- Locale: Jammu and Kashmir
- Termini: Jammu Tawi; Baramulla

History
- Opened: 6 June 2025

Technical
- Line length: 324 kilometres (201 mi)
- Num of tracks: 1
- Track gauge: 1,676 mm (5 ft 6 in) broad gauge
- Electrification: Yes
- Operating speed: 110–130 km/h (68–81 mph)
- Highest elevation: 1,730 m (5,680 ft)
Route map
Jammu–Baramulla line highlighted in red

The Jammu–Baramulla line (including the Udhampur–Srinagar–Baramula Rail Link (USBRL) subsection) is a 324 kilometres (201 mi) long railway between the cities of Jammu and Baramulla in Jammu and Kashmir India. It is fully operational as of 7 June 2025. Connecting the Kashmir Valley with the rest of India, this rail link has major geostrategic importance for the Indian armed forces. It has reduced the travel time between Jammu and Srinagar from 7 hours to 3 hours; it also connects the important religious pilgrimage sites of Mata Vaishno Devi Temple and Amarnath Temple.

Completed in several phases, this link entails several engineering achievements including the Chenab Bridge - world's highest railway bridge, the Anji Khad Bridge - India's first cable-stayed railway bridge, the Pir Panjal Railway Tunnel (Banihal railway tunnel) - India's longest railway tunnel as of 2025, and the T33 tunnel, which, while short, is immensely challenging as it punches through the Main Boundary Thrust of the Himalayas.

== History ==
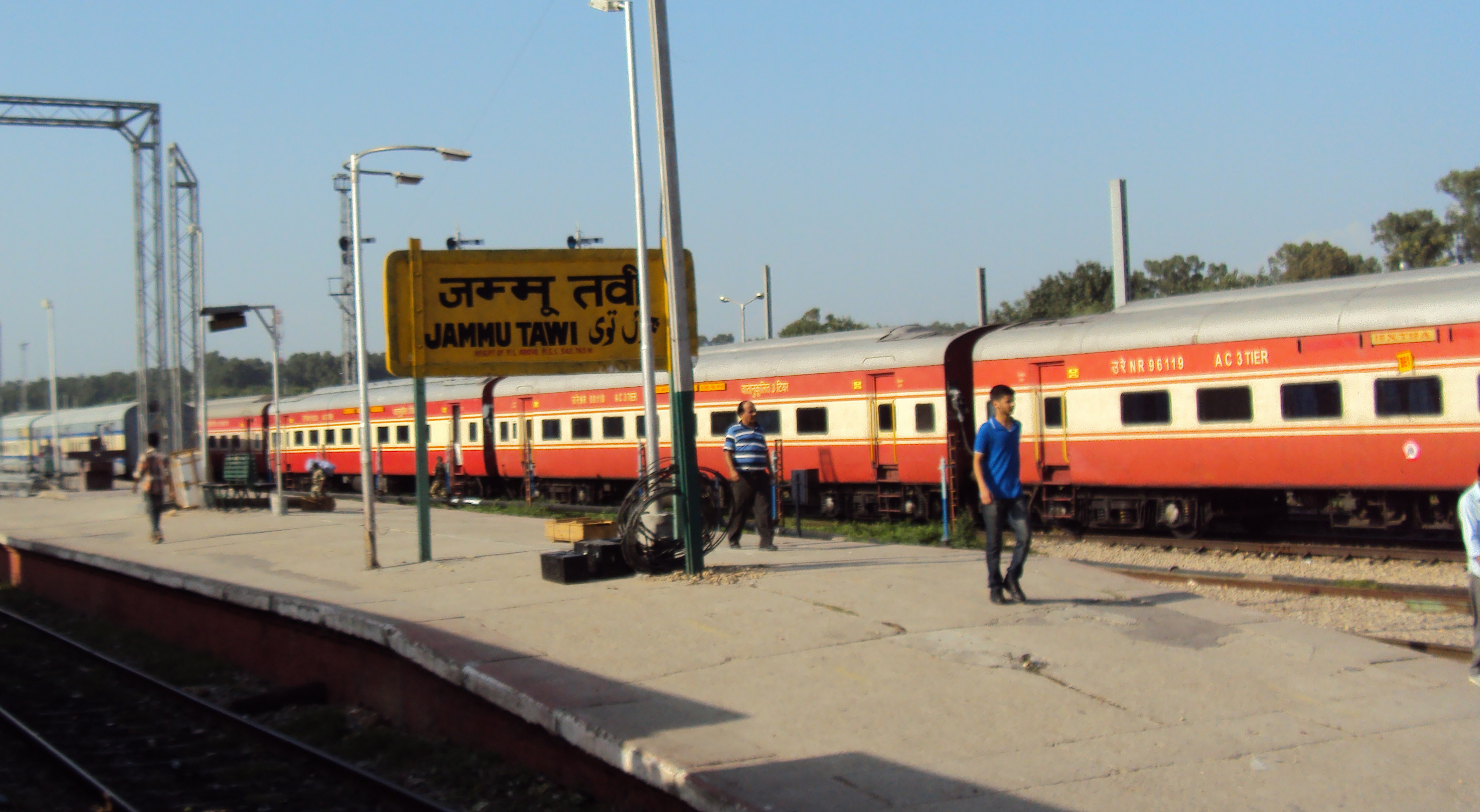
Jammu Tawi railway station.

In 1972, Prime Minister Indira Gandhi opened the newly laid railway line from Kathua to Jammu Tawi, and in 1983 she laid foundation stone for Jammu-Udhampur section of railway line. In 1994, while the Jammu-Udhampur line was still under-construction its extension to Baramulla was announced by the Prime minister PV Narsimharao.

In 2005, Prime Minister Manmohan Singh inaugurates the operational Jammu-Udhampur railway line construction of which was delayed by 21 years, He also inaugurated Anantnag-Mazhom section in 2008, Mazhom/Pattan-Baramulla section in 2009, Anantnag-Qazigund section in 2009, Qazigund-Banihal section in 2013.

In January 2025, Jammu Railway Division was inaugurated by Prime Minister Narendra Modi as a newly created division carved out from the Firozpur Division, and the responsibility for the Jammu-Baramaulla line was transferred from Firozpur Division to Jammu Railway Division.

=== Accidents ===
During the construction there were several fatal accidents, including death of Altaf Hussain, a Hindustan Construction Company (HCC) labourer in June 2005 by a tunnel collapse in Tathyar, the drowning of two girls in an excavated ditch on 16 May 2007, the death of Nepali labourer Tika Ram Balwari after being struck by a boulder in the Uri Varmul on 14 February 2008, the death of five occupants after a dump truck rolled into a deep gorge in Lower Juda More (near Kouri in Reasi district) on 18 April 2008, and the death of two workers, Abdul Rahman (age 34) and Jumma Baksh (24) at Chenab River bridge on 27 March 2011 when the basket in which they were riding (attached to a crane) unhooked and fell over 100 metres.

== Features ==
The railway crosses over 750 bridges and pass through over 100 km (62 mi) of tunnels.

=== Bridges ===
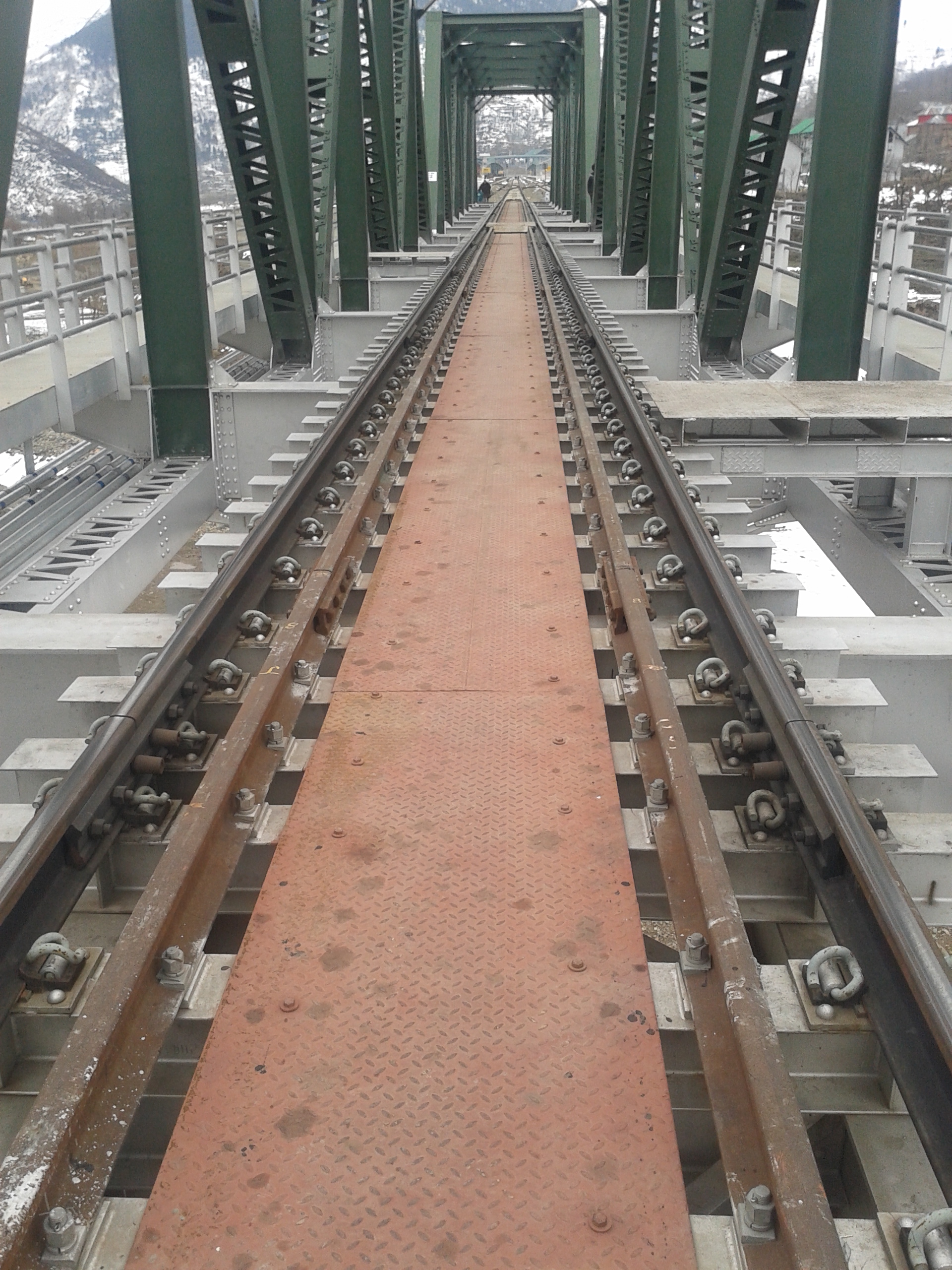
Rail bridge in Banihal.

Main bridges are:

- Chenab Bridge: 1,315-metre-long (4,314 ft) 11,215 m (6.969 mi) above the riverbed the arch bridge on the Chenab River is world's highest railway bridge as it is 35 metres (115 ft) higher than the top of the Eiffel Tower. Design with similar structure to West Virginia's New River Gorge Bridge, the Chenab bridge construction used the weathering steel for an environmentally-friendly appearance and to also eliminate the need for painting.
- Anji Khad Bridge: 657-metre-long (2,156 ft) bridge 186 m (610 ft) above the riverbed is India's first cable-stayed railway bridge.

=== Tunnels ===
- Banihal-Qazigund Railway Tunnel: 11.215-km (7-mile) long, 8.4 m wide and 7.39 m high tunnel is India longest rail tunnel in 2025, which also includes a 3 m-wide service road for maintenance and emergency use. Rail tunnel's average elevation of 1760 m is 440 m below the existing road tunnel. The tunnel facilitates transportation during winter (when inclement weather closes the Srinagar-Jammu highway), and halves the distance between Quazigund and Banihal (35 km by road and 17.5 km by train). The Banihal railway station is 1,702 m (5,584 ft) above mean sea level, and trains run from Banihal to Qazigund through the tunnel. The 5 km Banganga section was expected to be operational before the completion date of 2017–18 for the entire project. Built with the New Austrian tunnelling method, and a number of challenges have been encountered while tunnelling through the geologically young, unstable Sivalik Hills, requiring drastic solutions with steel arches and several feet of shotcrete and lattice girder support.

=== Gradient ===
Although the rail line is being built through a mountainous region, a one-percent ruling gradient has been set to provide a safe, smooth, reliable journey. Bank engines will not be required, making the journey quicker and smoother. It will use 5 ft 6 in (1,676 mm) broad gauge continuous welded rail laid on concrete sleepers, with a minimum curve radius of 676 m. The maximum speed will be 100 kilometres per hour (62 mph). Provision for future track doubling is made on major bridges.

=== Safety ===
There are Closed-circuit television cameras at major bridges, tunnels and stations, and all major bridges and tunnels are illuminated. Three-aspect colour-light signalling is installed on the route for safety, and GSM-R equipment will be installed in the future to improve its quality.

=== Maintenance ===
Maintenance workshop is at Badgam, north of Srinagar. It is owned-operated by Indian Railways's Jammu Railway Division of Northern zone.

== Construction ==
The total project cost in 2022 was INR28,000 crore (~US$3.5 billion).

=== Challenges ===
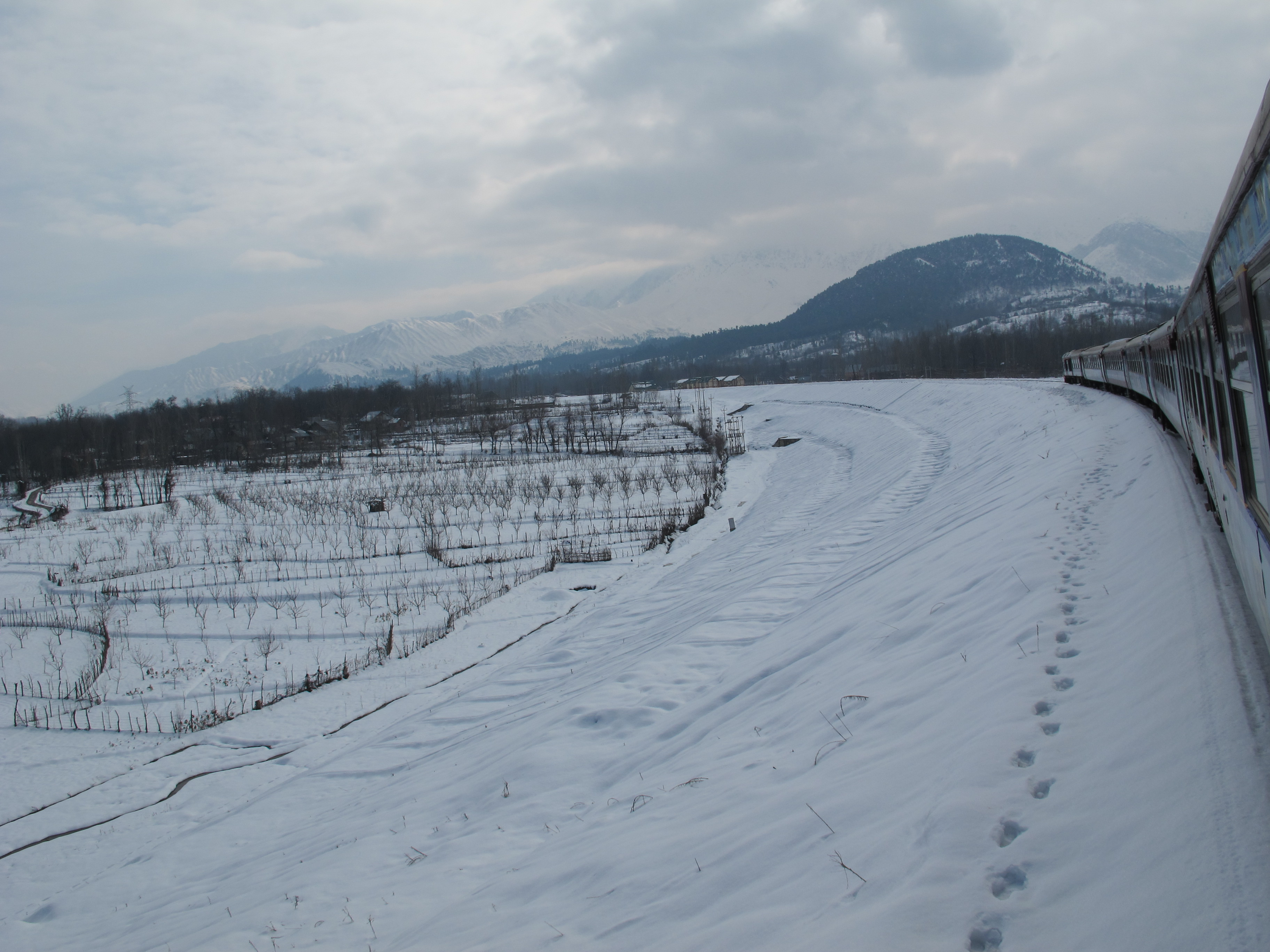
Training rounding a snow-laden curve in Qazigund.

The line was one of the most difficult rail project undertaken on the South Asia. The young Himalayas are geologically surprising and problematic. The track's alignment presents one of the greatest railway engineering challenges ever faced; only Tibet's Qingzang Railway, completed in 2006 across permafrost and climbing to over 5,000 m (16,000 ft) above sea level, is comparable. Although the Indian temperatures are less severe, the region experiences harsh winters with heavy snowfall. In the Pir Panjal Range, most peaks exceed 15,000 ft (4,600 m) in height.

=== Construction entities ===
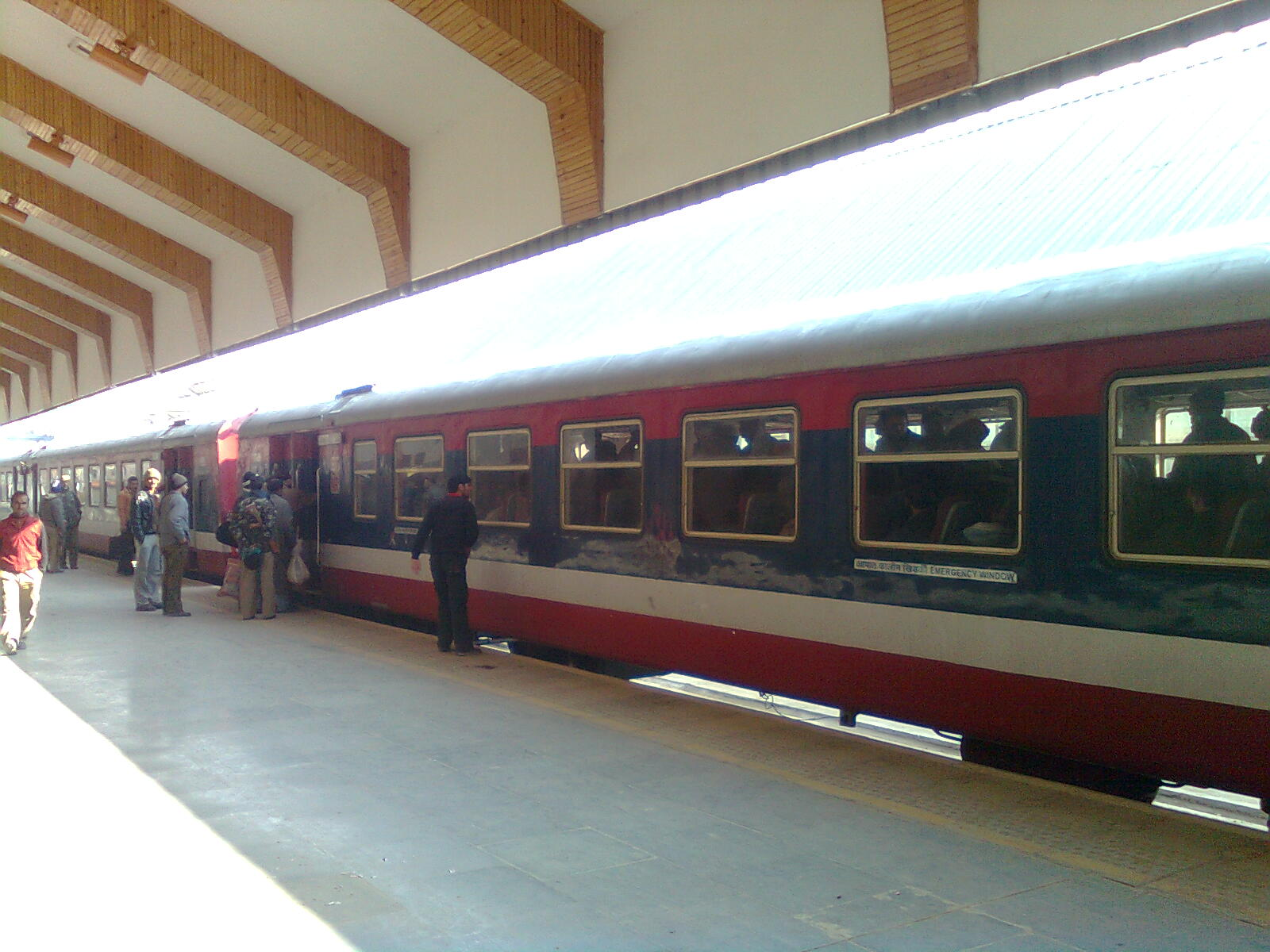
Srinagar railway station with passenger train.

Indian Railways (IR) is overall responsible for the construction of 25-kilometre (16 mi) Udhampur-Katra section. IR's subsidiary Konkan Railway Corporation was responsible for the construction of 90-kilometre (56 mi) Katra-Laole section, arguably the line's most difficult portion, with over 92 percent tunnels or bridges—12 kilometres (7.5 mi) of bridges and 72 kilometres (45 mi) of tunnels. Ircon International, a public-sector company, was responsible for the construction of 175-kilometre (109 mi) Dharam-Qazigund-Baramulla section and Hindustan Construction Company built the 11,215 m (6.969 mi) Pir Panjal tunnel on this section at the cost of ₹900 crore. Afcons Infrastructure Limited and South Korea's Ultra Engineering designed and built the Chenab Bridge for around ₹974 crore. Gammon India and South Africa's Archirodon Construction built the Anji Khad Bridge for ₹745 crore.

=== Phases ===
The construction of railway line was divided into four phases:

- Phase-1, operational since 2005, 53 km long from Jammu to Udhampur, was built over 21 years.
- Phase-2, operational since 4 July 2014, 25 km from Udhampur to Katra, includes 7 tunnels and 30 bridges.
- Phase-3, operational since 13 December 2024, 111 km from Katra to Banihal, has a total of 35 tunnels (includes 27 main and 8 escape tunnels), 62 bridges and a number of tunnels totalling 100 km out of total 129 km route length was most difficult section of the overall project. It required 262 km of access roads connecting 147,000 people in 73 villages; 160 km, connecting 29 villages, is completed.
- Phase-4, operational since 26 June 2013, 135 km long section from Banihal to Baramulla runs across the Pir Panjal Range from Baramulla to Banihal.

== Route ==
This rail link makes several tourist and religious locations more easily accessible at faster travel speed and shorter travel time: Katra - the base town of the Vaishno Devi|Shri Mata Vaishno Devi shrine, Reasi, Pahalgam, Aharbal, Gulmarg, Verinag, Qazigund, Anantnag, and Mazhom near Pattan, Dal Lake, Lolab Valley and Mughal Road.

== Train services ==
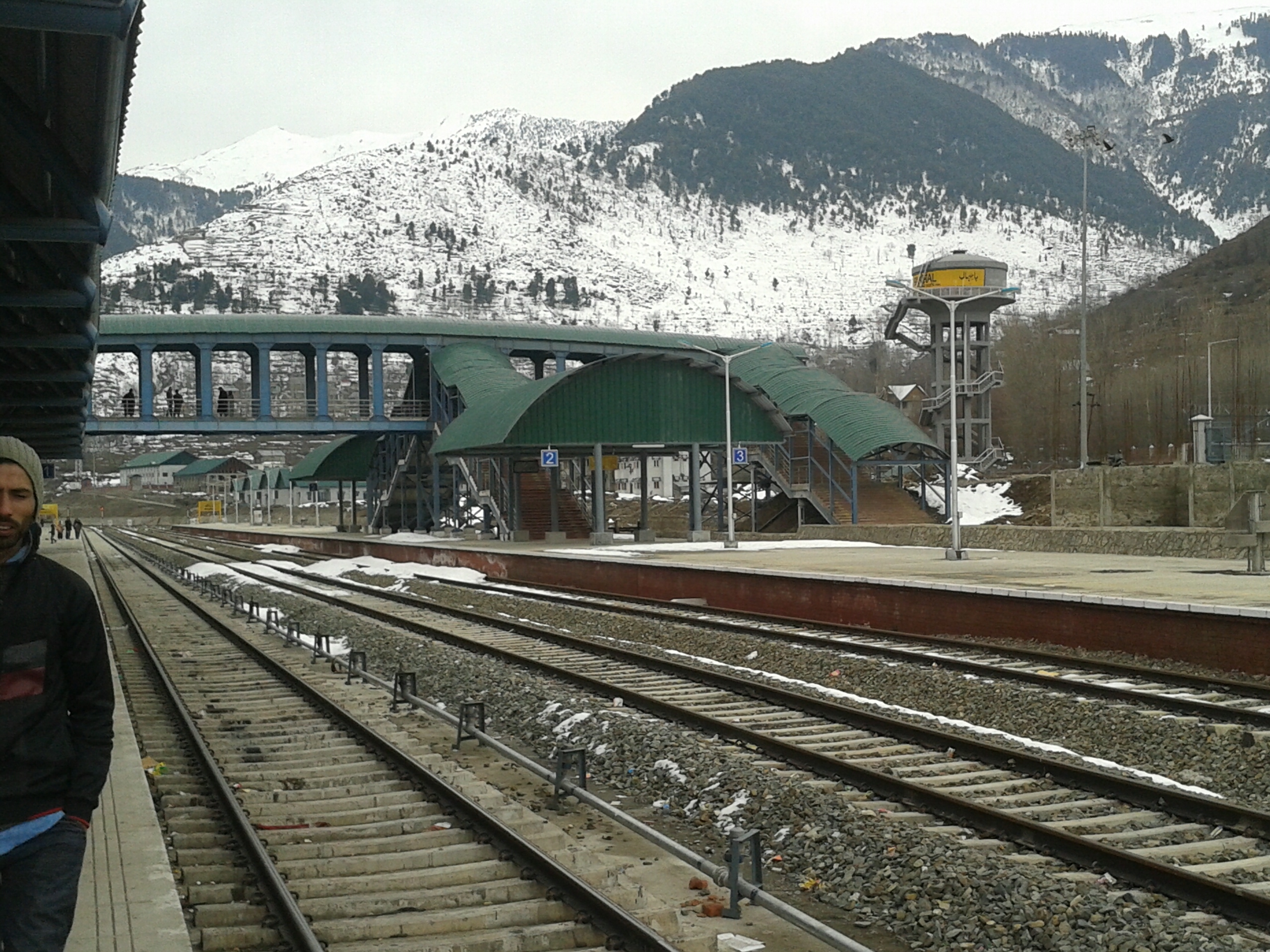
Banihal railway station.

=== Passenger services ===
Vande Bharat Express, air-conditioned, medium to long-distance train service operated by Indian Railways runs on this route. The heated and air-conditioned coaches have wide windows, sliding doors, reclining seats, and a snow-cutting cattle guard is attached to the front of the train to clear snow from the tracks during winter. Due to the valley's cold climate, the 1,400-horsepower diesel engine has a heating system for quick, trouble-free starts. Coaches have a public-information system (display and announcements) and a pneumatic suspension for riding comfort. There is a compartment for the physically disabled, with wider doors.

=== Freight service ===
Freight service (grain and petroleum products) run between the 10–12 daily passenger trains.

== Future extension ==
See planned new rail lines in Jammu and Kashmir.

== Alternate connectivity ==
Jammu-Baramulla line provides partial rail connectivity to Kargil and Leh, which have the following alternative existing and under-construction connectivity.

- Rail
  - Bhanupli–Leh line - under-construction, via Manali, Darcha, Pangi Valley, and Meroo.
- Road
  - NH-1, existing, via Baramulla, Srinagar, Drass and Kargil.
  - NH-3, existing, via Meroo, Pangi, and Darcha.

== Present status ==
- June 2025: The construction of the entire route from Jammu to Baramulla was complete and made operational when Prime Minister Narendra Modi flagged off a Jammu-Baramulla train on 6 June 2025, with future plans for several new rail lines extensions across Kashmir Valley.

== See also ==
- Geostrategic border rail lines of India
- Mughal Road
- Indian Railways
