= Shri Mata Vaishno Devi Katra–New Delhi Vande Bharat Express =

Vande Bharat Express train route in India

SMVD Katra - New Delhi Vande Bharat Express
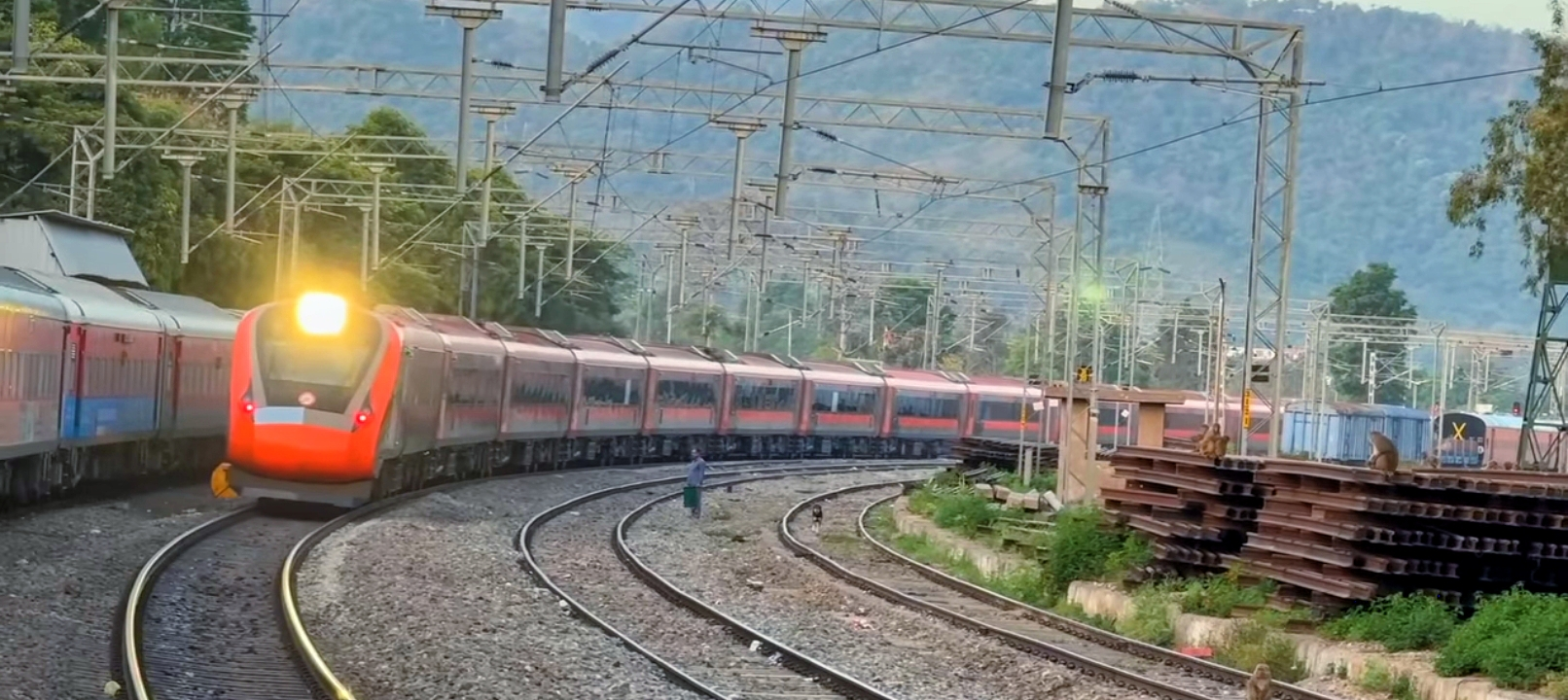
- SMVD Katra - New Delhi Vande Bharat Express

Overview
- Service type: Vande Bharat Express
- Status: Running
- Locale: Jammu and Kashmir, Punjab, Haryana and New Delhi
- First service: 30 December 2023 (Inaugural); 04 January 2024; 2 years ago (Commercial)
- Current operator: Northern Railways (NR)

Route
- Termini: Shri Mata Vaishno Devi Katra (SVDK); New Delhi (NDLS)
- Stops: 5
- Distance travelled: 655 km (407 mi)
- Average journey time: 08 hrs 20 mins
- Service frequency: Six days a week (Note: Except Wednesdays)
- Train number: 22477 / 22478
- Lines used: Baramulla–SVDK–Jammu Tawi line; Jammu Tawi–Jalandhar line (till Jalandhar Cantt. Jn.); Amritsar–Ambala line; Ambala–Delhi line

On-board services
- Classes: AC Chair Car, AC Executive Chair Car
- Seating arrangements: Airline style; Rotatable seats
- Sleeping arrangements: No
- Catering facilities: On board Catering
- Observation facilities: Large windows in all coaches
- Entertainment facilities: On-board WiFi; Infotainment System; Electric outlets; Reading light; Seat Pockets; Bottle Holder; Tray Table
- Baggage facilities: Overhead racks
- Other facilities: Kavach

Technical
- Rolling stock: Vande Bharat 2.0 (Last service: January 05 2025); Vande Bharat 3.0 (First service: January 06 2025)
- Track gauge: Indian gauge 1,676 mm (5 ft 6 in) broad gauge
- Electrification: 25 kV 50 Hz AC Overhead line
- Operating speed: 82 km/h (51 mph) (Avg.)
- Average length: 480 metres (1,570 ft) (20 coaches)
- Track owner: Indian Railways

The 22478/22477 SMVD Katra - New Delhi Vande Bharat Express is India's 37th Vande Bharat Express train, connecting the states of Jammu and Kashmir, Punjab, Haryana and New Delhi. This is the 2nd Vande Bharat Express train which runs on the New Delhi-SMVD Katra line after 3 October 2019.

This express train was inaugurated on 30 December 2023 by Prime Minister Narendra Modi via video conferencing from Ayodhya Dham Junction.

== Overview ==
This train is operated by Indian Railways, connecting Shri Mata Vaishno Devi Katra, MCTM Udhampur, Jammu Tawi, Kathua, Ludhiana Jn, Ambala Cantt. Jn and New Delhi. It is currently operated with train numbers 22478/22477 on 6 days a week basis.

== Rakes ==
It is the 35th 2nd Generation Vande Bharat Express train which was designed and manufactured by the Integral Coach Factory at Perambur, Chennai under the Make in India Initiative. On 6th January 2025 it was given the new 3rd generation Vande Bharat trainset having 20 coaches.

== Service ==
The 22478/22477 SMVD Katra - New Delhi Vande Bharat Express operates six days a week except Wednesdays, covering a distance of 655 km (407 mi) in a travel time of 8 hours 20 mins with an average speed of 80 km/h (50 mph). The Maximum Permissible Speed is 130 km/h (81 mph).

== See also ==
- New Delhi–Shri Mata Vaishno Devi Katra Vande Bharat Express
- Vande Bharat Express
- Tejas Express
- Gatimaan Express
- Shri Mata Vaishno Devi Katra railway station
- New Delhi railway station
