= Gomti Nagar (Lucknow)–Saharanpur Vande Bharat Express =

Mini Vande Bharat Express train route in India

Gomti Nagar (Lucknow) – Saharanpur Junction Vande Bharat Express

Overview
- Service type: Vande Bharat Express
- Locale: Uttar Pradesh; Uttarakhand
- First service: 8 November 2025; 11 months ago (Inaugural)
- Current operator: Northern Railway zone

Route
- Termini: Gomti Nagar; Saharanpur Junction
- Stops: 7
- Distance travelled: 535 km (332 mi)
- Average journey time: 8 hrs 40 mins
- Service frequency: Six days a week (except Mondays)
- Train number: 26504 / 26503

On-board services
- Classes: AC Executive Class (EC); Chair car (CC)
- Seating arrangements: Airline style; Rotatable seats
- Sleeping arrangements: No
- Catering facilities: On board
- Observation facilities: Large windows
- Entertainment facilities: On-board WiFi; Infotainment system; Electric outlets; Reading light; Seat pockets; Bottle holder; Tray table
- Baggage facilities: Overhead racks
- Other facilities: Kavach

Technical
- Rolling stock: Vande Bharat trainset
- Track gauge: Indian gauge
- Electrification: 25 kV 50 Hz AC overhead line
- Operating speed: 62 km/h (39 mph) (average)
- Average length: 192 m (630 ft) (8 coaches)
- Track owner: Indian Railways
- Rake maintenance: Northern Railway zone

The 26504/26503 Gomti Nagar – Saharanpur Vande Bharat Express is the 80th Vande Bharat Express train, connecting the cities of Lucknow and Saharanpur in the Indian state of Uttar Pradesh. The service was inaugurated by the Indian prime minister Narendra Modi via video conferencing from Varanasi on 8 November 2025. The train was earlier supposed to start from Lucknow Junction to Saharanpur Junction but had its schedule clash with the Lucknow–Dehradun Vande Bharat Express and due to that inconvenience, it is now being operated from Gomti Nagar.

== Service ==
The train is operated by the Northern Railway zone of the Indian Railways. It runs between Gomti Nagar and Saharanpur Junction with stoppages at Daliganj Junction, Sitapur Junction, Shahjahanpur Junction, Bareilly Junction, Moradabad Junction, Najibabad Junction, and Roorkee. It is runs with designated train numbers 26504/26503 and operates six days a week (except Mondays). It covers a distance of 535 km (332 mi) in 8 hours and 40 minutes at an average speed of 62 km/h (39 mph).

== Rake ==
The service uses a second generation Vande Bharat trainset, designed and manufactured by the Integral Coach Factory at Perambur, Chennai under the Make in India initiative.

== See also ==
- Gatiman Express – Semi-high speed train by Indian Railways
- Tejas Express – Series of Indian Semi-high speed train
- Amrit Bharat Express – Series of express train services of Indian Railways
