= Secunderabad–Visakhapatnam Vande Bharat Express =

Mini Vande Bharat Express train route in India

Secunderabad Jn – Visakhapatnam Jn Vande Bharat Express

Overview
- Service type: Vande Bharat Express
- Locale: Telangana and Andhra Pradesh
- First service: 12 March 2024 (Inaugural); 13 March 2024; 2 years ago (Commercial)
- Current operator: South Central Railways (SCR)

Route
- Termini: Secunderabad Junction (SC); Visakhapatnam Junction (VSKP)
- Stops: 6
- Distance travelled: 698 km (434 mi)
- Average journey time: 08 hrs 45 mins
- Service frequency: Six days a week (Note: Except Thursdays)
- Train number: 20707 / 20708
- Line used: (TBC)

On-board services
- Classes: AC Chair Car, AC Executive Chair Car
- Seating arrangements: Airline style; Rotatable seats
- Sleeping arrangements: No
- Catering facilities: On board Catering
- Observation facilities: Large windows in all coaches
- Entertainment facilities: On-board WiFi; Infotainment System; Electric outlets; Reading light; Seat Pockets; Bottle Holder; Tray Table
- Baggage facilities: Overhead racks
- Other facilities: Kavach

Technical
- Rolling stock: Mini Vande Bharat 2.0 (Last service: Jan 12 2025); Vande Bharat 2.0 (Last service: July 04 2025); Vande Bharat 3.0 (First service: July 05 2025)
- Track gauge: Indian gauge 1,676 mm (5 ft 6 in) broad gauge
- Electrification: 25 kV 50 Hz AC Overhead line
- Operating speed: 80 km/h (50 mph) (Avg.)
- Average length: 480 metres (1,570 ft) (20 coaches)
- Track owner: Indian Railways
- Rake maintenance: Secunderabad Jn (SC)
Route map
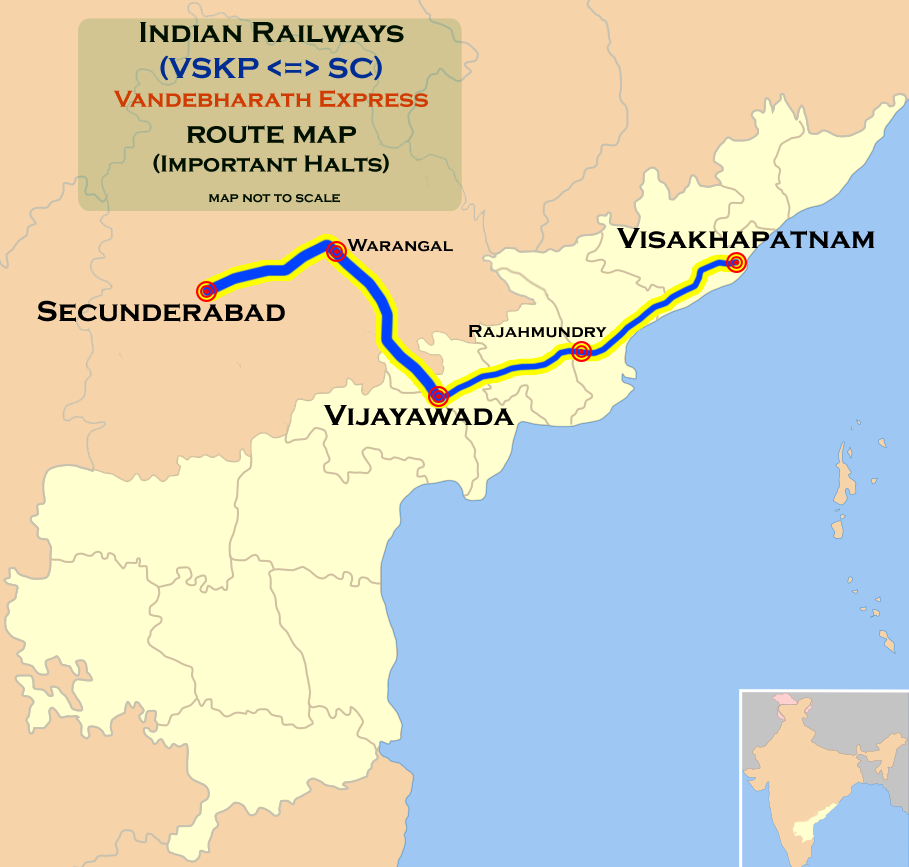

The 20707/20708 Secunderabad – Visakhapatnam Vande Bharat Express is India's 48th Vande Bharat Express train, connecting the twin city and state capital of Telangana, Secundarabad with the largest metropolitan city Visakhapatnam in Andhra Pradesh. This express train was inaugurated by Prime Minister Narendra Modi via video conferencing from Ahmedabad on March 12, 2024.

== Overview ==
This train is operated by Indian Railways, connecting Secunderabad Jn, Warangal, Khammam, Vijayawada Jn, Eluru, Rajamahendravaram, Samalkot Jn and Visakhapatnam Jn. It is operated with train numbers 20707/20708 on 6 days a week basis.

== Rakes ==
It was the forty-sixth 2nd Generation and thirty-first Mini Vande Bharat 2.0 Express train which was designed and manufactured by the Integral Coach Factory at Perambur, Chennai under the Make in India Initiative.

=== Coach augmentation ===
As per latest updates from Waltair Division under Indian Railways, the current running rake has been converted to 20-car, previously ran with 16-car rake as this would benefit passengers who wish to travel to key locations like Vijayawada, Rajamahendravaram and to the metropolitan city of Visakhapatnam. This conversion was commenced on July 5, 2025, and it started its service from Secunderabad Jn.

== Service ==
The 20707/20708 Secunderabad Jn - Visakhapatnam Jn Vande Bharat Express operates six days a week except Thursdays, covering a distance of 698 km (434 mi) in a travel time of eight hours with an average speed of 80 km/h (50 mph). The service has six intermediate stops. The Maximum Permissible Speed is 130 km/h (81 mph).

== See also ==
- Visakhapatnam–Secunderabad Vande Bharat Express
- Vande Bharat Express
- Tejas Express
- Gatimaan Express
- Secunderabad Junction railway station
- Visakhapatnam railway station
