= Sabarmati (Ahmedabad) – Veraval Vande Bharat Express =

Mini Vande Bharat Express train route in India

Sabarmati (Ahmedabad) – Veraval Junction Vande Bharat Express

Overview
- Service type: Vande Bharat Express
- Status: Operational
- Locale: Gujarat
- First service: 26 May 2025 (Inaugural); 27 May 2025; 16 months ago (Commercial)
- Current operator: Western Railways (WR)

Route
- Termini: Sabarmati Junction (SBIB); Veraval Junction (VRL)
- Stops: 08
- Distance travelled: 455 km (283 mi)
- Average journey time: 06 hrs 55 min
- Service frequency: Six days a week (Note: Except Thursdays)
- Train number: 26901 / 26902
- Line used: (TBC)

On-board services
- Classes: AC Chair Car, AC Executive Chair Car
- Seating arrangements: Airline style; Rotatable seats
- Sleeping arrangements: No
- Catering facilities: On-board catering
- Observation facilities: Large windows in all coaches
- Entertainment facilities: On-board WiFi; Infotainment system; Electric outlets; Reading light; Seat pockets; Bottle holder; Tray table
- Baggage facilities: Overhead racks
- Other facilities: Kavach

Technical
- Rolling stock: Mini Vande Bharat 2.0
- Track gauge: Indian gauge
- Electrification: 25 kV 50 Hz AC overhead line
- Operating speed: 61 km/h (38 mph) (Avg.)
- Average length: 192 metres (630 ft) (08 coaches)
- Track owner: Indian Railways
- Rake maintenance: Sabarmati Jn (SBIB)

The 26901/26902 Sabarmati (Ahmedabad) – Veraval Vande Bharat Express is India's 67th Vande Bharat Express train, connecting the largest capital metropolitan city, Ahmedabad with the pilgrimage city of Veraval in the western side of Gujarat.

This express train was inaugurated on 26 May 2025, by Prime Minister Narendra Modi via virtual conferencing from Dahod, located on the eastern side of Gujarat.

== Overview ==
This train is currently operated by Indian Railways, connecting Sabarmati BG (SBIB), Gandhigram, Dholka, Dhandhuka, Botad Junction, Dhola Junction, Dhasa Junction, Chital, Junagadh Junction and Veraval Junction. Earlier it was running from Sabarmati Junction to Veraval Junction via Viramgam Junction, Surendranagar Junction, Wankaner Junction, Rajkot Junction, Junagadh Junction route. It is currently operated with train no. 26901/26902 on 6 days a week basis.

== Rakes ==
It is the sixty-second 2nd Generation Mini Vande Bharat Express train which was designed and manufactured by the Integral Coach Factory at Perambur, Chennai under the Make in India initiative.

== Service ==
The 26901/26902 Sabarmati (Ahmedabad) - Veraval Vande Bharat Express currently operates 6 days a week, covering a distance of 430 km (267 mi) in a travel time of 07 hrs with average speed of 61 km/h. The Maximum Permissible Speed (MPS) is 110 km/h (68 mph).

== See also ==
- Vande Bharat Express
- Tejas Express
- Gatiman Express
- Sabarmati Junction railway station
- Veraval Junction railway station
