= Nagpur–Secunderabad Vande Bharat Express =

Mini Vande Bharat Express train route in India

Nagpur Junction – Secunderabad Junction Vande Bharat Express

Overview
- Service type: Vande Bharat Express
- Locale: Maharashtra and Telangana
- First service: 16 September 2024 (Inaugural); 19 September 2024; 2 years ago (Commercial)
- Current operator: Central Railways (CR)

Route
- Termini: Nagpur Junction (NGP); Secunderabad Junction (SC)
- Stops: 07
- Distance travelled: 575 km (357 mi)
- Average journey time: 07 hrs 15 mins
- Service frequency: Six days a week (Note: Except Tuesdays)
- Train number: 20101 / 20102
- Line used: Nagpur–Secunderabad line

On-board services
- Classes: AC Chair Car, AC Executive Chair Car
- Seating arrangements: Airline style; Rotatable seats
- Sleeping arrangements: No
- Catering facilities: On-board catering
- Observation facilities: Large windows in all coaches
- Entertainment facilities: On-board WiFi; Infotainment system; Electric outlets; Reading light; Seat pockets; Bottle holder; Tray table
- Baggage facilities: Overhead racks
- Other facilities: Kavach

Technical
- Rolling stock: Vande Bharat 3.0 (Last service: Jan 17 2025); Mini Vande Bharat 2.0 (First service: Jan 19 2025)
- Track gauge: Indian gauge
- Electrification: 25 kV 50 Hz AC overhead line
- Operating speed: 79 km/h (49 mph) (Avg.)
- Average length: 192 metres (630 ft) (08 coaches)
- Track owner: Indian Railways
- Rake maintenance: Nagpur Jn (NGP)

The 20101/20102 Nagpur–Secunderabad Vande Bharat Express is India's 65th Vande Bharat Express train, which connects the Orange City of India, Nagpur in Maharashtra with the twin city of Hyderabad, Secunderabad in Telangana.

This express train was inaugurated on September 16, 2024, by Prime Minister Narendra Modi from Ahmedabad.

== Overview ==
This train is currently operated by Indian Railways, connecting Nagpur Junction, Sevagram Junction, Chandrapur, Balharshah, Sirpur Kaghaznagar, Manchiryal, Ramagundam, Kazipet Junction and Secunderabad Junction. It currently operates with train numbers 20101/20102 on 6 days a week basis.

== Rakes ==
It was the first 3rd generation Vande Bharat Express train which was designed with advanced technologies and improvements from the 2nd generation trainset and manufactured by the Integral Coach Factory at Perambur, Chennai under the Make in India initiative.

However the rake was withdrawn from service and replaced with Mini Vande Bharat 2.0 (MVB2) trainset W.E.F. 19 January 2025 because of low occupancy.

== Service ==
The 20101/20102 Nagpur–Secunderabad Vande Bharat Express currently operates 6 days a week, covering a distance of 575 km (357 mi) in a travel time of 07 hrs 15 mins with average speed of 79 km/h (49 mph). The Maximum Permissible Speed (MPS) is 130 km/h (81 mph).

== See also ==
- Vande Bharat Express
- Tejas Express
- Gatiman Express
- Nagpur Junction railway station
- Secunderabad Junction railway station
