= Firozpur Cantonment–Delhi Junction Vande Bharat Express =

Mini Vande Bharat Express train route in India

Firozpur Cantonment – Delhi Junction Vande Bharat Express
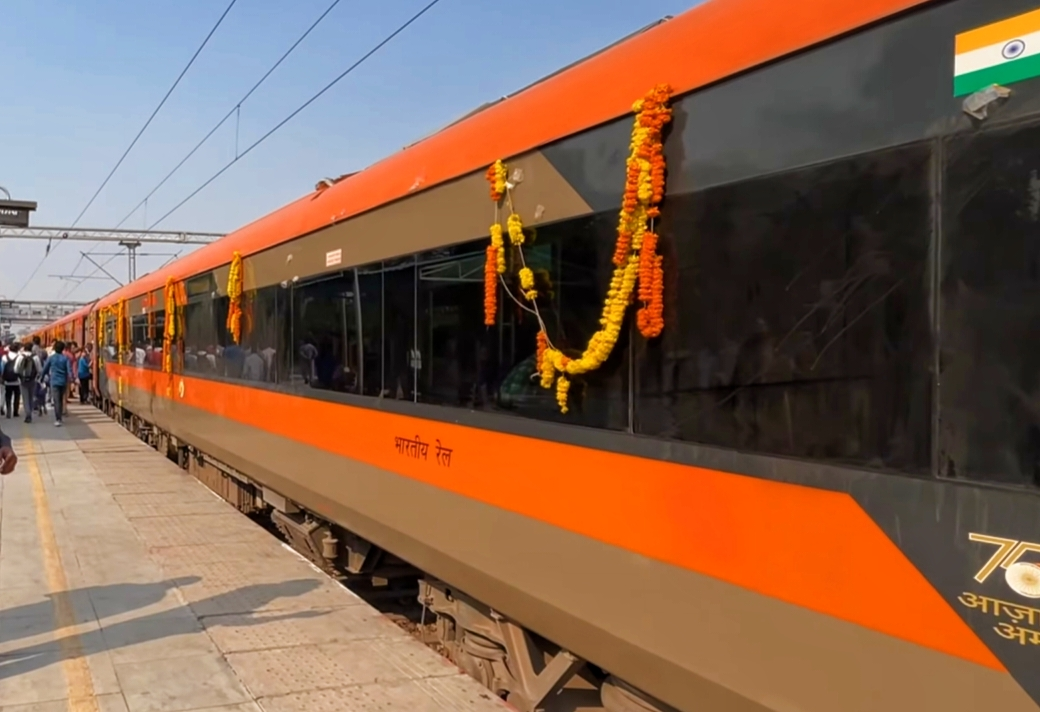
- Firozpur Cantonment – Delhi Junction Vande Bharat Express at Kurukshetra Junction

Overview
- Service type: Vande Bharat Express
- Locale: Delhi, Haryana, and Punjab
- First service: 8 November 2025; 8 months ago (Inaugural); 10 November 2025; 8 months ago (Commercial)
- Current operator: Northern Railways (NR)

Route
- Termini: Firozpur Cantonment; Delhi Junction
- Stops: 8
- Distance travelled: 487 km (303 mi)
- Average journey time: 6 hrs 35 mins
- Service frequency: Six days a week (Note: Except Wednesdays)
- Train number: 26462 / 26461

On-board services
- Classes: AC Executive Class (EC); Chair car (CC)
- Seating arrangements: Airline style; Rotatable seats
- Sleeping arrangements: No
- Catering facilities: On board
- Observation facilities: Large windows
- Entertainment facilities: On-board WiFi; Infotainment system; Electric outlets; Reading light; Seat pockets; Bottle holder; Tray table
- Baggage facilities: Overhead racks
- Other facilities: Kavach

Technical
- Rolling stock: Vande Bharat trainset
- Track gauge: Indian gauge
- Electrification: 25 kV 50 Hz AC overhead line
- Operating speed: 74 km/h (46 mph) (average)
- Average length: 192 m (630 ft) (8 coaches)
- Track owner: Indian Railways
- Rake maintenance: Northern Railway zone

The 26462/26461 Firozpur Cantonment – Delhi Junction Vande Bharat Express is India's 79th Vande Bharat Express train, connecting Firozpur in Punjab with the national capital of New Delhi. The service was inaugurated by the Indian prime minister Narendra Modi via video conferencing from Varanasi on 8 November 2025.

== Service ==
The train is operated by the Northern Railway zone of the Indian Railways. It runs between Firozpur Cantonment and Delhi Junction with stoppages at Faridkot, Bhatinda, Barnala, Dhuri Junction, Patiala, Ambala Cantonment Junction, Kurukshetra Junction, and Panipat Junction. It runs with designated train numbers 26462/26461 and operates six days a week. It covers a distance of 487 km (303 mi) in 6 hours and 35 minutes at an average speed of 74 km/h (46 mph).

== Rake ==
It is the seventy-third Vande Bharat trainset, designed and manufactured by the Integral Coach Factory at Perambur, Chennai under the Make in India initiative.

== See also ==
- Gatiman Express – Semi-high speed train by Indian Railways
- Tejas Express – Series of Indian Semi-high speed train
