= Belagavi (Belgaum)–KSR Bengaluru Vande Bharat Express =

Mini Vande Bharat Express train route in India

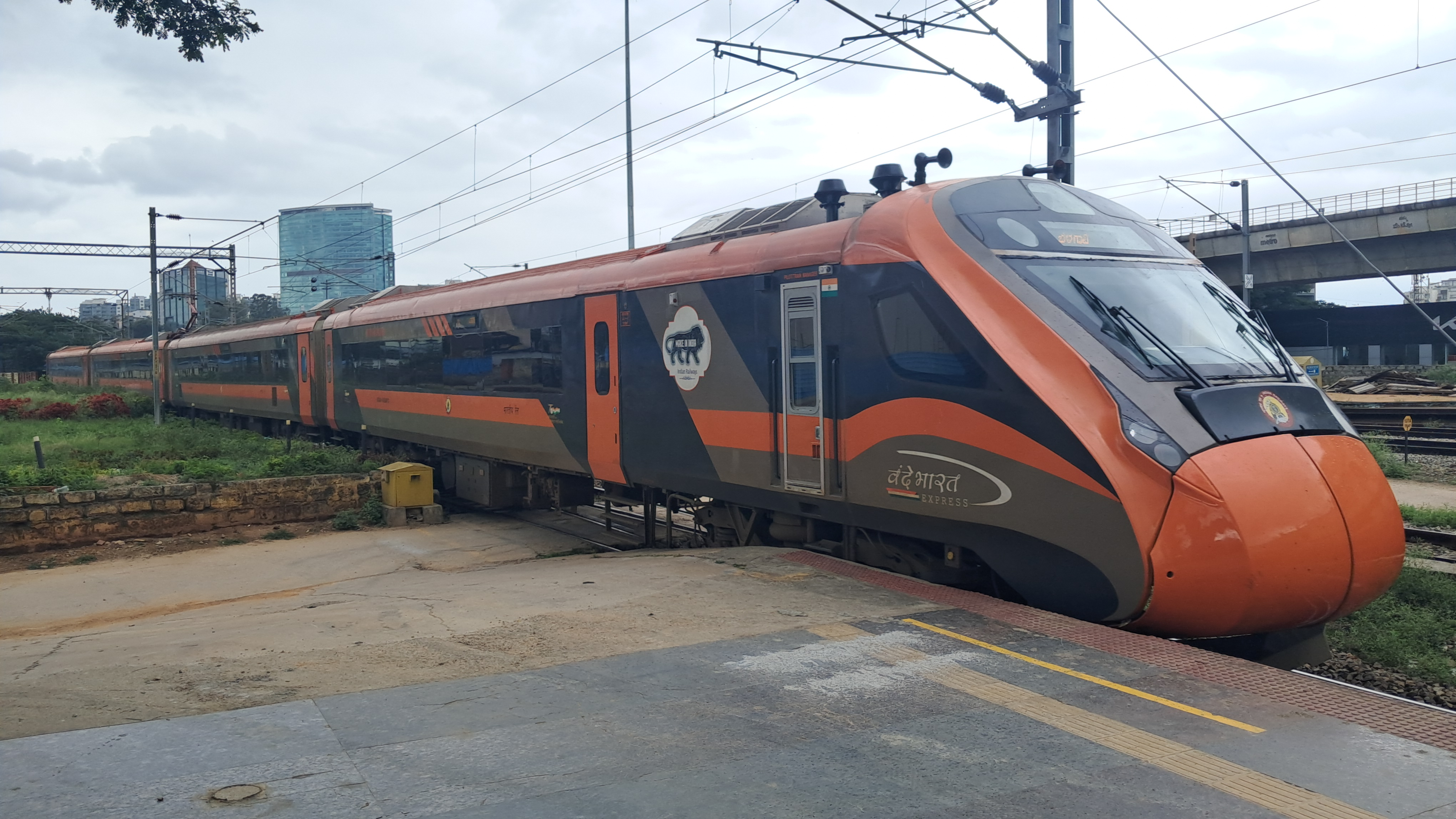
- This Mini Vande Bharat Express arriving at Yesvantpur Junction and heading towards Belagavi

Overview
- Service type: Vande Bharat Express
- Locale: Karnataka
- First service: 10 August 2025; 11 months ago (Inaugural); 11 August 2025; 11 months ago (Commercial)
- Current operator: South Western Railways (SWR)

Route
- Termini: Belagavi (BGM); KSR Bengaluru City Jn (SBC)
- Stops: 06
- Distance travelled: 612 km (380 mi)
- Average journey time: 08 hrs 10 mins(26752) 08 hrs 15 mins(26751)
- Service frequency: Six days a week (Note: Except Wednesdays)
- Train number: 26751 / 26752
- Lines used: Belagavi–Londa section Londa–Hubli section Hubli–Bengaluru section

On-board services
- Classes: AC Chair Car, AC Executive Chair Car
- Seating arrangements: Airline style; Rotatable seats
- Sleeping arrangements: No
- Catering facilities: On-board catering
- Observation facilities: Large windows in all coaches
- Entertainment facilities: On-board WiFi; Infotainment system; Electric outlets; Reading light; Seat pockets; Bottle holder; Tray table
- Baggage facilities: Overhead racks
- Other facilities: Kavach

Technical
- Rolling stock: Mini Vande Bharat 2.0
- Track gauge: Indian gauge
- Electrification: 25 kV 50 Hz AC overhead line
- Operating speed: 73 km/h (45 mph) (Avg.)
- Average length: 192 metres (630 ft) (08 coaches)
- Track owner: Indian Railways
- Rake maintenance: Belagavi (BGM)

The 26751/26752 Belagavi (Belgaum)–KSR Bengaluru Vande Bharat Express is India's 71st Vande Bharat Express train, which currently connects the brassware city of Belagavi and terminates at the Silicon City of Bengaluru in Karnataka.

This express train was inaugurated on 10 August 2025, by Prime Minister Narendra Modi, who also inaugurated the much-delayed Yellow Line under Namma Metro from the Silicon City of Bengaluru.

== Overview ==
This train is currently operated by Indian Railways, connecting Belagavi, Dharwad, SSS Hubballi Jn, SMM Haveri, Davangere, Tumakuru, Yesvantpur Junction and KSR Bengaluru City Jn. It is currently operated with train numbers 26751/26752 on 6 days a week basis.

== Rakes ==
It is the sixty-sixth 2nd Generation Mini Vande Bharat Express train which was designed and manufactured by the Integral Coach Factory at Perambur, Chennai under the Make in India initiative.

== Gallery ==
A couple of pictures on this particular express train shown below:-

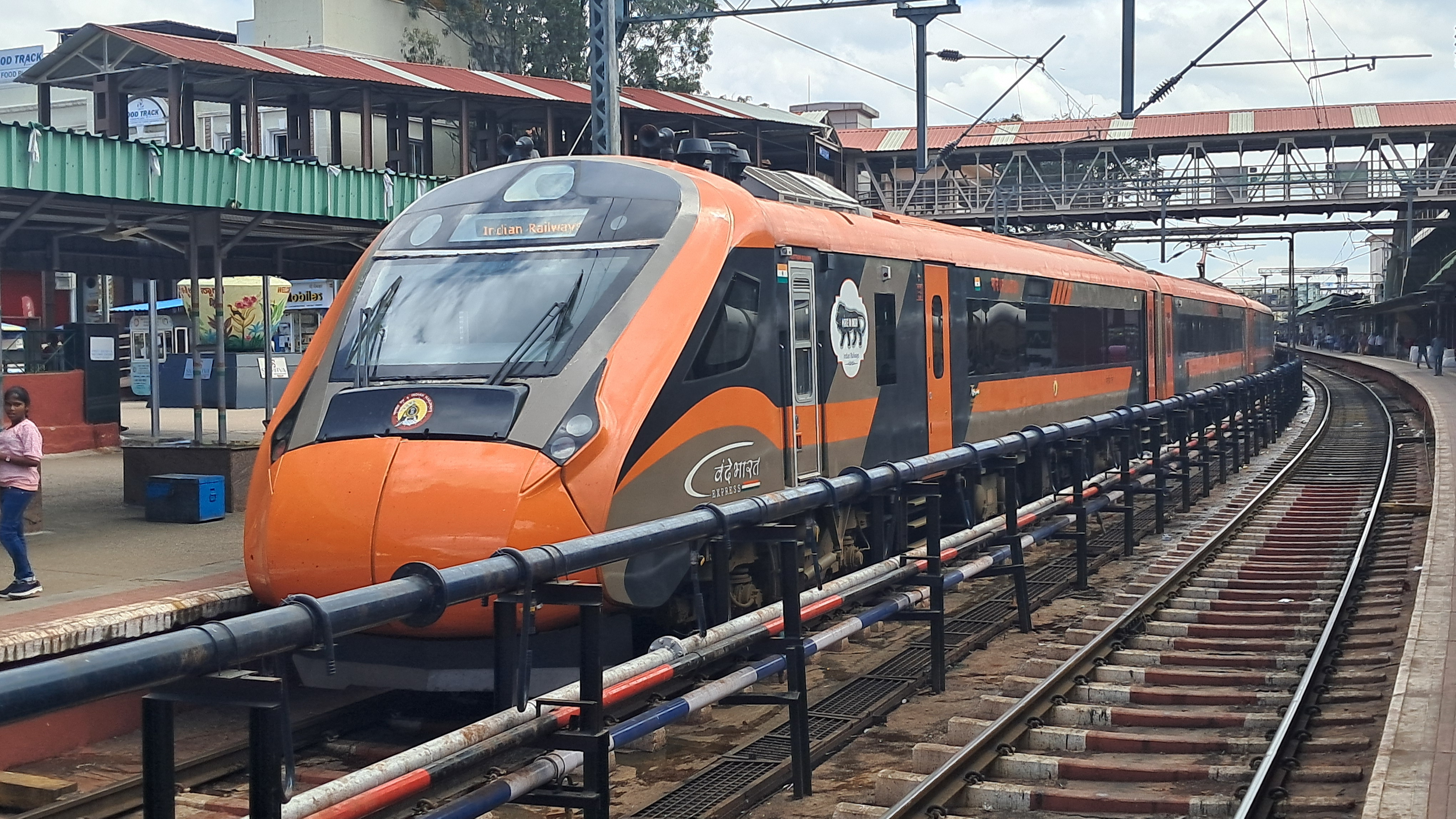
This Mini Vande Bharat Express on standby at KSR Bengaluru City Jn

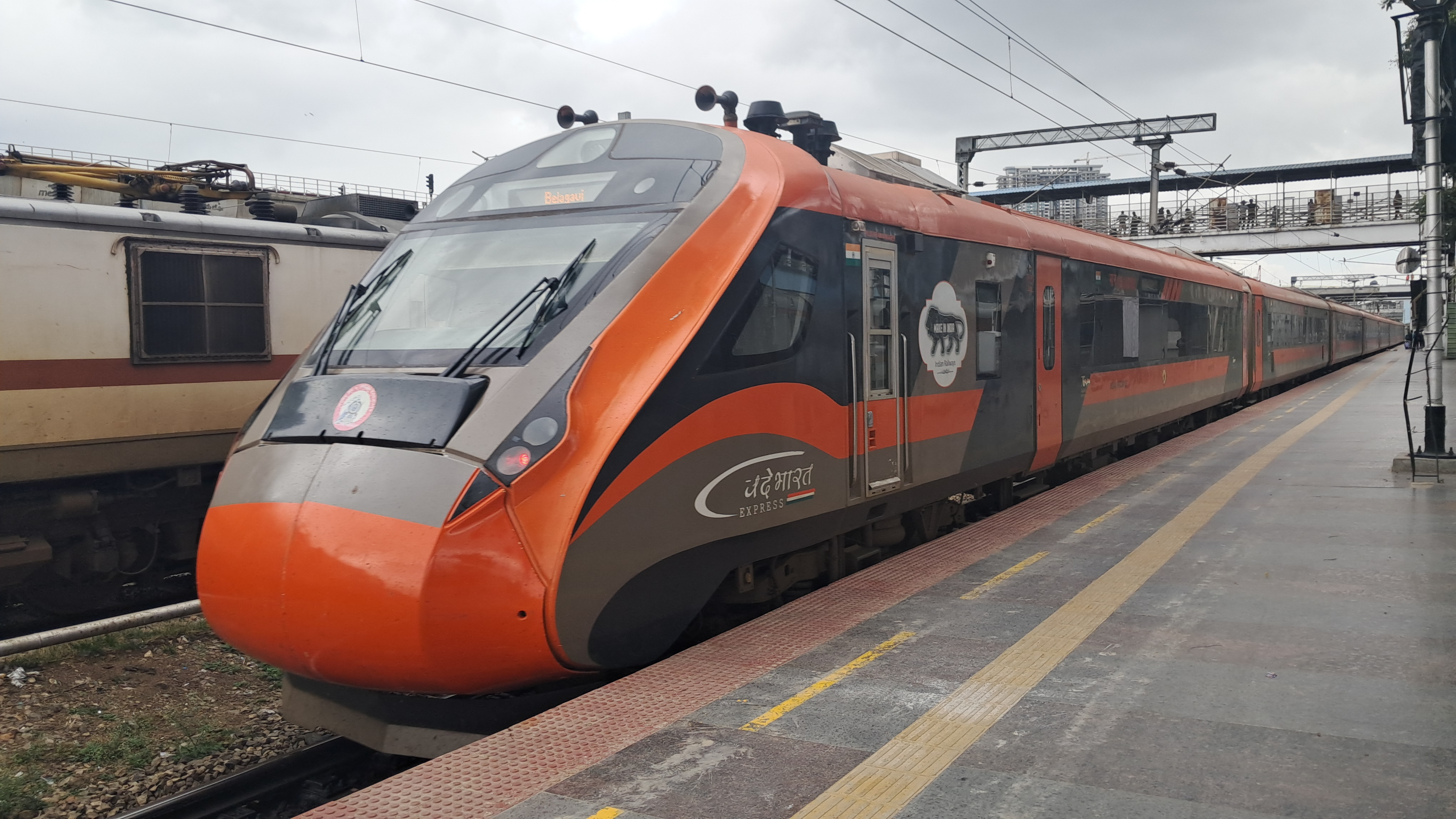
This Mini Vande Bharat Express arriving at Yesvantpur Junction

== Service ==
The 26751/26752 Belagavi (Belgaum)–KSR Bengaluru Vande Bharat Express currently operates 6 days a week, covering a distance of 612 km (380 mi) in a travel time of 08 hrs 30 mins with average speed of 72 km/h. The Maximum Permissible Speed (MPS) is 110 km/h (68 mph).

== See also ==
- Vande Bharat Express
- Tejas Express
- Gatiman Express
- Belagavi railway station
- KSR Bengaluru City Jn railway station
