= Secunderabad–Tirupati Vande Bharat Express =

Vande Bharat Express train route in India

Secunderabad Junction – Tirupati Vande Bharat Express

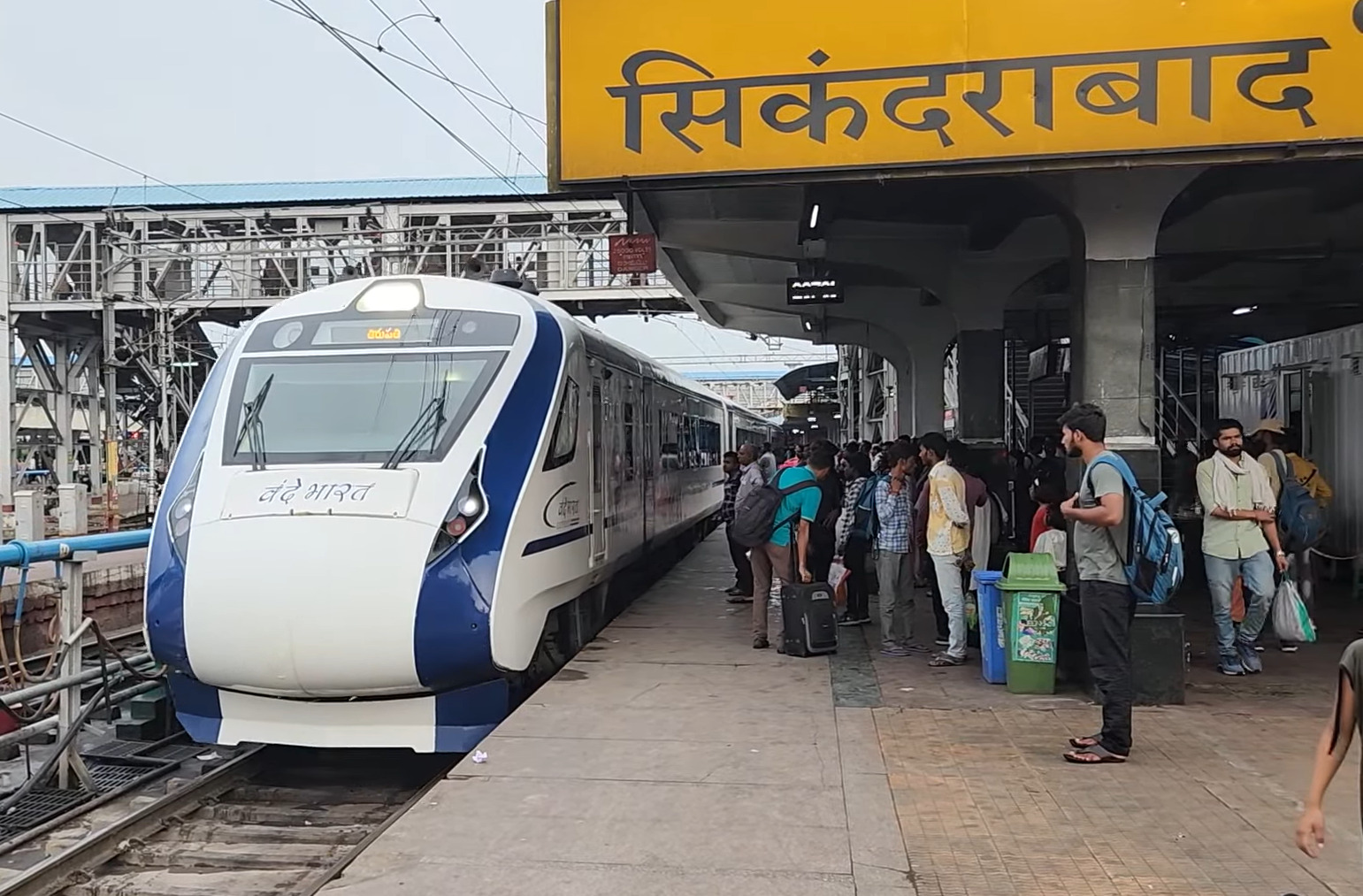
- Secunderabad Tirupati Vande Bharat Express departing from Secunderabad

Overview
- Service type: Vande Bharat Express
- Locale: Telangana and Andhra Pradesh
- First service: 8 April 2023 (Inaugural run); 9 April 2023; 3 years ago (Commercial run)
- Current operator: South Central Railways (SCR)

Route
- Termini: Secunderabad Jn (SC); Tirupati (TPTY)
- Stops: 05
- Distance travelled: 662 km (411 mi)
- Average journey time: 08 hrs 20 mins
- Service frequency: Six days a week (Note: Except Tuesdays)
- Train number: 20701 / 20702
- Lines used: Secunderabad–Nagpur (till Pagidipalli Cabin); Pagidipalli–Nallapadu section Guntur–Tenali section Howrah–Chennai (from Guntur Jn till Gudur Jn); Gudur–Katpadi (till Tirupati)

On-board services
- Classes: AC chair car, AC executive chair car
- Seating arrangements: Airline style; Rotatable seats
- Sleeping arrangements: No
- Catering facilities: On-board catering
- Observation facilities: Large windows in all coaches
- Entertainment facilities: On-board WiFi; Infotainment system; Electric outlets; Reading light; Seat pockets; Bottle holder; Tray table
- Baggage facilities: Overhead racks
- Other facilities: Kavach

Technical
- Rolling stock: Vande Bharat 2.0 (Last service: November 25 2025); Vande Bharat 3.0 (First service: November 26 2025)
- Track gauge: Indian gauge
- Electrification: 25 kV 50 Hz AC Overhead line
- Operating speed: 80 km/h (50 mph) (Avg.)
- Average length: 480 metres (1,570 ft) (20 coaches)
- Track owner: Indian Railways
- Rake maintenance: Secunderabad Jn

The 20701/20702 Secunderabad–Tirupati Vande Bharat Express is India's 12th Vande Bharat Express train, connecting the states of Telangana and Andhra Pradesh.

== Overview ==
This train is operated by Indian Railways, connecting Secunderabad Jn, Nalgonda, Miryalaguda, Guntur Jn, Ongole, Nellore and Tirupati. This is one of the most successful Vande Bharat. It is currently operated with train numbers 20701/20702 on 6 days a week basis. The train was flagged off by Prime Minister Narendra Modi on 8 April 2023.

== Rakes ==
It is the tenth 2nd Generation and the first train to be converted from a Mini Vande Bharat 2.0 Express train to a Vande Bharat Express 2.0 train (due to high demand and occupancy rate, it has been converted from 8-coach rake to 16-coach rake) which was designed and manufactured by the Integral Coach Factory (ICF) at Perambur, Chennai under the Make in India initiative.

=== Coach augmentation ===
For the benefit of passengers, marking this as a significant boost in the capacity on one of the most demanding routes between Telangana and Andhra Pradesh, the South Central Railways has confirmed to augment 4 additional coaches, thus running with the new 20-coach Vande Bharat 3.0 express train. This was commenced on November 26 2025 from Secunderabad Jn. This gives better travel convenience, especially during weekends, festivals and peak pilgrimage time periods.

== Service ==
The 20701/20702 Secunderabad–Tirupati Vande Bharat Express operates six days a week except Tuesdays, covering a distance of 662 kilometres (411 mi) in a travel time of 8 hours with an average speed of 79 kilometres per hour (49 mph). The service has 5 intermediate stops. The Maximum Permissible Speed is 130 km/h (81 mph).

== See also ==
- Vande Bharat Express
- Tejas Express
- Gatiman Express
- Secunderabad Junction railway station
- Tirupati railway station
