= Jodhpur–Sabarmati (Ahmedabad) Vande Bharat Express =

Mini Vande Bharat Express train route in India

Jodhpur - Sabarmati (Ahmedabad) Vande Bharat Express

Overview
- Service type: Vande Bharat Express
- Locale: Rajasthan and Gujarat
- First service: 7 July 2023 (Inaugural run); 9 July 2023; 2 years ago (Commercial run)
- Current operator: North Western Railways (NWR)

Route
- Termini: Jodhpur (JU); Sabarmati Junction (SBIB)
- Stops: 5
- Distance travelled: 449 km (279 mi)
- Average journey time: 06 hrs 10 mins
- Service frequency: Six days a week (Note: Except Tuesdays)
- Train number: 12461 / 12462
- Lines used: Jodhpur–Luni line; Munabao–Marwar line; Jaipur–Ahmedabad line

On-board services
- Classes: AC Chair Car, AC Executive Chair Car
- Seating arrangements: Airline style; Rotatable seats
- Sleeping arrangements: No
- Catering facilities: On-board catering
- Observation facilities: Large windows in all coaches
- Entertainment facilities: On-board WiFi; Infotainment System; Electric outlets; Reading light; Seat Pockets; Bottle Holder; Tray Table
- Baggage facilities: Overhead racks
- Other facilities: Kavach

Technical
- Rolling stock: Mini Vande Bharat 2.0
- Track gauge: Indian gauge 1,676 mm (5 ft 6 in) broad gauge
- Electrification: 25 kV 50 Hz AC Overhead line
- Operating speed: 73 km/h (45 mph) (Avg.)
- Average length: 192 metres (630 ft) (08 coaches)
- Track owner: Indian Railways
- Rake maintenance: (TBC)

The 12461/12462 Jodhpur - Sabarmati (Ahmedabad) Vande Bharat Express is India's 24th Vande Bharat Express train, connecting the city of Jodhpur in Rajasthan with Sabarmati in Gujarat. The train was inaugurated by Prime Minister Narendra Modi via video conference from Gorakhpur Junction on 7 July 2023.

== Overview ==
This train is operated by Indian Railways, connecting Jodhpur, Pali Marwar, Falna, Abu Road, Palanpur Jn, Mahesana Jn and Sabarmati Jn. It is currently operated with train numbers 12461/12462 on 6 days a week basis.

== Rakes ==
It is the twenty-second 2nd Generation and tenth Mini Vande Bharat 2.0 Express train which was designed and manufactured by the Integral Coach Factory at Perambur, Chennai under the Make in India Initiative.

== Service ==
The 12461/12462 Jodhpur - Sabarmati BG Vande Bharat Express operates six days a week except Tuesdays, covering a distance of 451 km (280 mi) in a travel time of 6 hours with an average speed of 75 km/h (47 mph). The service has 5 intermediate stops. The Maximum Permissible Speed is 130 km/h (81 mph).

== See also ==
- Vande Bharat Express
- Gatimaan Express
- Tejas Express
- Jodhpur Junction railway station
- Sabarmati Junction railway station
