= Sudhanshu Mani =

India Railway engineer

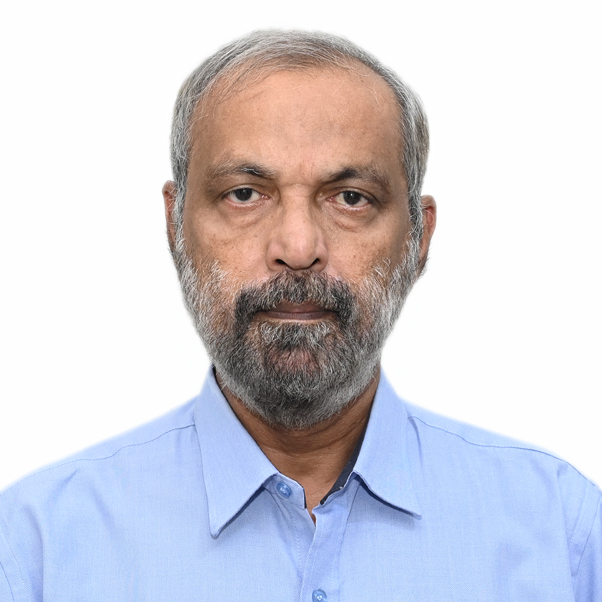
- Born: 1958 (age 67–68)
- Citizenship: India
- Occupation: Engineer
- Known for: Vande Bharat Express
- Title: Former General Manager, Integral Coach Factory

Sudhanshu Mani is an Indian innovator and railway engineer known for his leadership in the development of the Vande Bharat Express, India's first indigenous semi high speed train. He was General Manager of Indian Railways Integral Coach Factory (ICF) in Chennai.

== Life and education ==
Mani was born in Gorakhpur, Uttar Pradesh and raised in India, He did his schooling at Colvin Taluqdars' College in Lucknow in 1975 and later joined the Special Class Railway Apprentice (SCRA) program. He held various key positions in Indian Railways, he also known for modernizing train operations and infrastructure. He retired in 2018 from Indian railway services, contributing significantly to the transportation sector.

== Awards ==
He was awarded NDTV Infrashakti Award in 2024 by Union Minister Nitin Gadkari for his contribution in Indian Railways infrastructure as Infravisionary.

== Bibliography ==
- My Train 18 Story: India’s First Indigenous Modern Train, India ISBN 978-81-948974-3-9
- Shakespeare and Ghalib: A collation by their self-styled nephew, India ISBN 978-93-91465-27-8
