= Durg–Visakhapatnam Vande Bharat Express =

Mini Vande Bharat Express train route in India

Durg – Visakhapatnam Vande Bharat Express

Overview
- Service type: Vande Bharat Express
- Status: Operating
- Locale: Chhattisgarh, Odisha and Andhra Pradesh
- First service: 16 September 2024 (Inaugural); 20 September 2024; 19 months ago
- Current operator: South East Central Railways (SECR)

Route
- Termini: Durg Junction (DURG); Visakhapatnam Junction (VSKP)
- Stops: 09
- Distance travelled: 567 km (352 mi)
- Average journey time: 08 hrs
- Service frequency: Six days a week (Note: Except Thursdays)
- Train number: 20829 / 20830
- Lines used: Mumbai–Nagpur–Howrah line (till Jharsuguda Jn); Jharsuguda–Vizianagaram line; Khurda Road–Visakhapatnam line

On-board services
- Classes: AC Chair Car, AC Executive Chair Car
- Seating arrangements: Airline style; Rotatable seats
- Sleeping arrangements: No
- Catering facilities: On board Catering
- Observation facilities: Large windows in all coaches
- Entertainment facilities: On-board WiFi; Infotainment System; Electric outlets; Reading light; Seat Pockets; Bottle Holder; Tray Table
- Baggage facilities: Overhead racks
- Other facilities: Kavach

Technical
- Rolling stock: Vande Bharat 2.0 (Last service: Jan 22 2025); Mini Vande Bharat 2.0 (First service: Jan 24 2025)
- Track gauge: Indian gauge 1,676 mm (5 ft 6 in) broad gauge
- Electrification: 25 kV 50 Hz AC Overhead line
- Operating speed: 71 km/h (44 mph) (Avg.)
- Average length: 192 metres (630 ft) (08 coaches)
- Track owner: Indian Railways
- Rake maintenance: Durg Jn (DURG)

The 20829/20830 Durg – Visakhapatnam Vande Bharat Express is India's 66th Vande Bharat Express train, connecting the city of Durg with the metropolitan city of Visakhapatnam in Andhra Pradesh.

This express train was inaugurated on September 16, 2024, by Prime Minister Narendra Modi via video conferencing from the largest metropolitan city of Ahmedabad in the western state of Gujarat.

== Overview ==
This train is currently operated by Indian Railways, connecting Durg Jn, Raipur Jn, Mahasamund, Khariar Road, Kantabanji, Titlagarh Jn, Kesinga, Rayagada, Parvathipuram, Vizianagaram Jn and Visakhapatnam Jn. It currently operates with train numbers 20829/20830 on 6 days a week basis.

== Rakes ==
It was the sixty-first 2nd Generation Vande Bharat Express train which was designed and manufactured by the Integral Coach Factory at Perambur, Chennai under the Make in India Initiative. However the rake was withdrawn and replaced with Mini Vande Bharat 2.0 (MVB2) in the month of January 2024 because of low occupancy.

== Service ==
The 20829/20830 Durg - Visakhapatnam Vande Bharat Express currently operates 6 days a week, covering a distance of 567 km (352 mi) in a travel time of 08 hrs with average speed of 71 km/h (44 mph). The Maximum Permissible Speed (MPS) will be confirmed after commercial run.

== See also ==
- Vande Bharat Express
- Tejas Express
- Gatiman Express
- Durg Junction railway station
- Visakhapatnam railway station
