= Yesvantpur–Madgaon Vande Bharat Express =

Train in India

Yesvantpur – Madgaon Vande Bharat Express

Overview
- Service type: Vande Bharat Express
- Locale: Karnataka and Goa
- First service: 13 November 2026; 2 days ago (Inaugural); 15 November 2026; 0 days ago (Commercial)
- Current operator: South Western Railways (SWR)

Route
- Termini: Yesvantpur Junction (YPR); Madgaon Junction (MAO)
- Stops: 12
- Distance travelled: 671 km (417 mi)
- Average journey time: 13 hrs 20 mins
- Service frequency: Six days a week (Note: Except Wednesdays - 26655 | Except Thursdays - 26656)
- Train number: 26655 / 26656
- Lines used: Yesvantpur - Arsikere - Hubballi line ( upto Chikka Banavara Jn); Chikka Banavara Jn - Hassan Jn line Hassan Jn - Mangaluru Jn line Mangaluru Jn - Madgaon Jn Line ( Konkan Railway Zone from Thokur)

On-board services
- Classes: AC Chair Car, AC Executive Chair Car
- Seating arrangements: Airline style; Rotatable seats
- Sleeping arrangements: No
- Catering facilities: On board Catering
- Observation facilities: Large windows in all coaches
- Entertainment facilities: On-board WiFi; Infotainment System; Electric outlets; Reading light; Seat Pockets; Bottle Holder; Tray Table
- Baggage facilities: Overhead racks
- Other facilities: Kavach

Technical
- Rolling stock: Vande Bharat 2.0 16 coaches
- Track gauge: Indian gauge 1,676 mm (5 ft 6 in) broad gauge
- Electrification: 25 kV 50 Hz AC Overhead line
- Operating speed: 52 km/h (32 mph) (Avg.)
- Average length: 384 metres (1,260 ft) (16 coaches) (TBC)
- Track owner: Indian Railways
- Rake maintenance: Yesvantpur Jn (YPR)
Route map

The 26655/26656 Yesvantpur–Madgaon Vande Bharat Express is India's 79th Vande Bharat Express train. It belongs to South Western Railway zone that runs between the city Yesvantpur Junction of Karnataka and Madgaon Junction of Goa in India.

This express train was inaugurated on 13th November 2026 by the Prime Minister Narendra Modi in Bengaluru.

== Overview ==
This train will be operated by Indian Railways, connecting Yesvantpur Jn. and Madgaon Jn. It will be operated with train numbers 26655/26656 on 6 days a week basis.

== Rakes ==
It will be the upcoming 2nd Generation and Mini Vande Bharat 2.0 Express train which will be designed and manufactured by the Integral Coach Factory at Perambur, Chennai under the Make in India Initiative.

== Service ==
The 26655/26656 Yesvantpur - Madgaon Vande Bharat Express will operate 6 days a week, covering a distance of 671 km (417 mi) in a travel time of 13hrs 20mins with average speed of 52 km/h. The Maximum Permissible Speed (MPS) will be confirmed after commercial run.

== See also ==
- Vande Bharat Express
- Tejas Express
- Gatiman Express
- Yesvantpur Junction railway station
- Mangalore Junction railway station
- Madgaon Junction railway station
