= MGR Chennai Central–Coimbatore Vande Bharat Express =

Mini Vande Bharat Express train route in India

MGR Chennai Central – Coimbatore Junction Vande Bharat Express

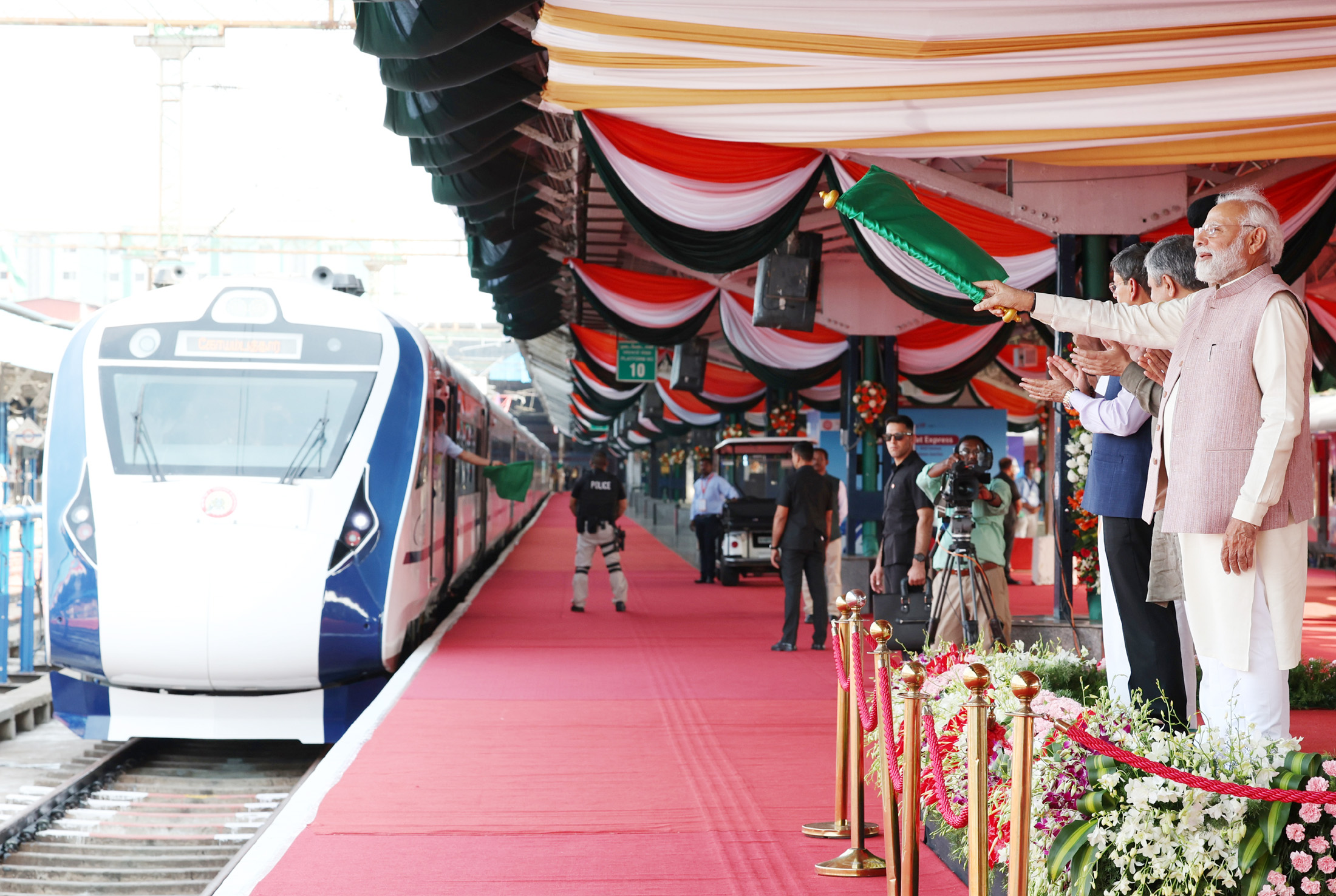
- Prime Minister Narendra Modi flags off Chennai–Coimbatore Vande Bharat Express, in Tamil Nadu on 8 April 2023.

Overview
- Service type: Vande Bharat Express
- Locale: Tamil Nadu
- First service: 8 April 2023 (Inaugural run); 9 April 2023; 3 years ago (Commercial run)
- Current operator: Southern Railways (SR)

Route
- Termini: MGR Chennai Central (MAS); Coimbatore Junction (CBE)
- Stops: 3
- Distance travelled: 495 km (308 mi)
- Average journey time: 05 hrs 50 mins
- Service frequency: Six days a week (Note: Except Wednesdays)
- Train number: 20643 / 20644
- Lines used: MGR Chennai Central – SBC Line (till Jolarpettai Jn); Jolarpettai–Coimbatore Line

On-board services
- Classes: AC Chair Car, AC Executive Chair Car
- Seating arrangements: Airline style; Rotatable seats
- Sleeping arrangements: No
- Catering facilities: On-board catering
- Observation facilities: Large windows in all coaches
- Entertainment facilities: On-board WiFi; Infotainment system; Electric outlets; Reading light; Seat pockets; Bottle holder; Tray table
- Baggage facilities: Overhead racks
- Other facilities: Kavach

Technical
- Rolling stock: Mini Vande Bharat 2.0
- Track gauge: Indian gauge
- Electrification: 25 kV 50 Hz AC overhead line
- Operating speed: 80 km/h (50 mph) (Avg.)
- Average length: 192 metres (630 ft) (08 coaches)
- Track owner: Indian Railways
- Rake maintenance: Coimbatore Jn

The 20643/20644 MGR Chennai Central – Coimbatore Vande Bharat Express is India's 13th Vande Bharat Express train, connecting the city of Chennai with Coimbatore in Tamil Nadu.

== Overview ==
This train is operated by Indian Railways, connecting MGR Chennai Central, Salem Junction, Erode Junction, Tiruppur and Coimbatore Junction. It is currently operated with train numbers 20643/20644 on 6 days a week basis. This train was flagged off by Prime Minister Narendra Modi on 8 April 2023.

== Rakes ==
It is the eleventh 2nd Generation and the second Mini Vande Bharat 2.0 Express train manufactured by the Integral Coach Factory (ICF) at Perambur, Chennai under the Make in India initiative.

== Service ==
The 20643/20644 MGR Chennai Ctrl – Coimbatore Jn Vande Bharat Express operates six days a week except Wednesdays, covering a distance of 495 km (308 mi) in a travel time of 6 hours with an average speed of 82 km/h (51 mph). The service has 3 intermediate stops. The Maximum Permissible Speed is 130 km/h (81 mph).

== See also ==
- Vande Bharat Express
- Tejas Express
- Gatimaan Express
- Chennai Central railway station
- Coimbatore Junction railway station
