= Indore–Nagpur Vande Bharat Express =

Mini Vande Bharat Express train route in India

Indore Junction - Nagpur Junction Vande Bharat Express

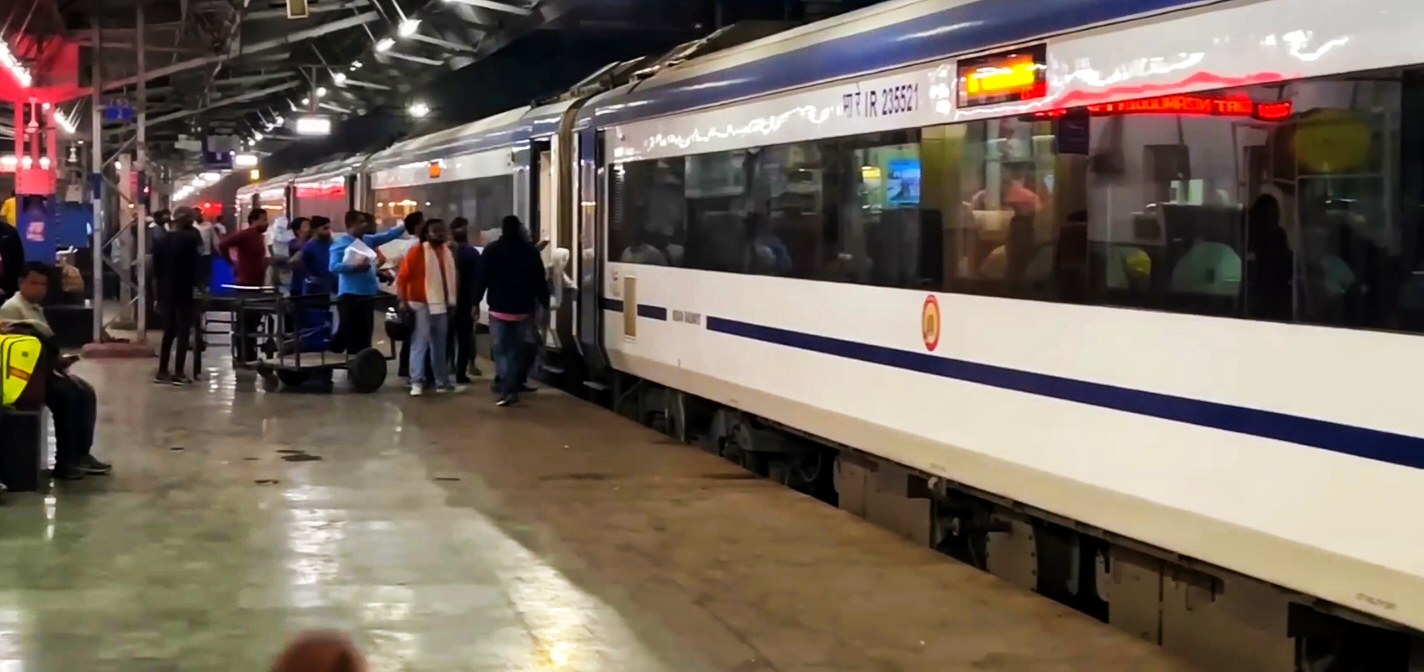
- Indore Junction - Nagpur Junction Vande Bharat Express At Itarsi Junction

Overview
- Service type: Vande Bharat Express
- Locale: Madhya Pradesh, Maharashtra
- First service: 27 June 2023 (Inaugural run); 28 June 2023; 3 years ago (Commercial run)
- Current operator: Western Railways (WR)

Route
- Termini: Indore Junction (INDB); Nagpur Junction (NGP)
- Stops: 5
- Distance travelled: 635 km (395 mi)
- Average journey time: 08:20 hrs
- Service frequency: Six days a week (Note: Except Sundays)
- Train number: 20911 / 20912
- Lines used: Indore–Dewas–Ujjain section; Ujjain–Bhopal section; Bhopal–Nagpur section

On-board services
- Classes: AC Chair Car, AC Executive Chair Car
- Seating arrangements: Airline style; Rotatable seats
- Sleeping arrangements: No
- Catering facilities: On-board catering
- Observation facilities: Large windows in all coaches
- Entertainment facilities: On-board WiFi; Infotainment System; Electric outlets; Reading light; Seat Pockets; Bottle Holder; Tray Table
- Baggage facilities: Overhead racks
- Other facilities: Kavach

Technical
- Rolling stock: Mini Vande Bharat 2.0 (Last service: Nov 22 2025); Vande Bharat 2.0 (First service: Nov 24 2025)
- Track gauge: Indian gauge 1,676 mm (5 ft 6 in) broad gauge
- Electrification: 25 kV 50 Hz AC Overhead line
- Operating speed: 76 km/h (47 mph) (Avg.)
- Average length: 192 metres (630 ft) (08 coaches)
- Track owner: Indian Railways
- Rake maintenance: Indore Jn (INDB)

The 20911/20912 Indore - Nagpur Vande Bharat Express is India's 23rd Vande Bharat Express train, connecting the city of Indore of Madhya Pradesh with Nagpur city in Maharashtra. Initially it ran from Indore Jn to Bhopal Jn when the train was first flagged off by Prime Minister Narendra Modi on 27 June 2023. Starting from 9 October 2023, the train was extended to Nagpur, providing enhanced connectivity in the region.

== Overview ==
This train is operated by Indian Railways, connecting Indore Jn, Ujjain Jn, Bhopal Jn, Narmadapuram, Itarsi Jn, Betul and Nagpur Jn. It is being operated with train numbers 20912/20911 on 6 days a week basis. Initially it ran from Indore Jn to Bhopal Jn when the train was first flagged off on 27 June 2023. Starting from 9 October 2023, the train was extended to Nagpur, providing enhanced connectivity in the region.

== Rakes ==
It is the twenty-first 2nd Generation and ninth Mini Vande Bharat 2.0 Express train which was designed and manufactured by the Integral Coach Factory at Perambur, Chennai under the Make in India Initiative.

=== Coach augmentation ===
According to Western Railways' notification dated 20 November 2025, this express train will be permanently augmented with 08 additional AC coaches, thus running with 16-coach rake in order to meet the surging passenger demand on this route. This change will come into effect on 24 November 2025 and will start from Indore Jn.

== Service ==
The 20911/20912 Indore Jn - Nagpur Jn Vande Bharat Express operates six days a week except Sundays, covering a distance of 636 km (395 mi) in a travel time of 8 hours with an average speed of 76 km/h (47 mph). The service has 5 intermediate stops. The Maximum Permissible Speed is 130 km/h (81 mph).

== See also ==
- Vande Bharat Express
- Gatimaan Express
- Tejas Express
- Bhopal Junction railway station
- Indore Junction railway station
- Nagpur Junction railway station
