= Rani Kamalapati–Hazrat Nizamuddin Vande Bharat Express =

Vande Bharat Express train route in India

Rani Kamalapati - Hazrat Nizamuddin Vande Bharat Express

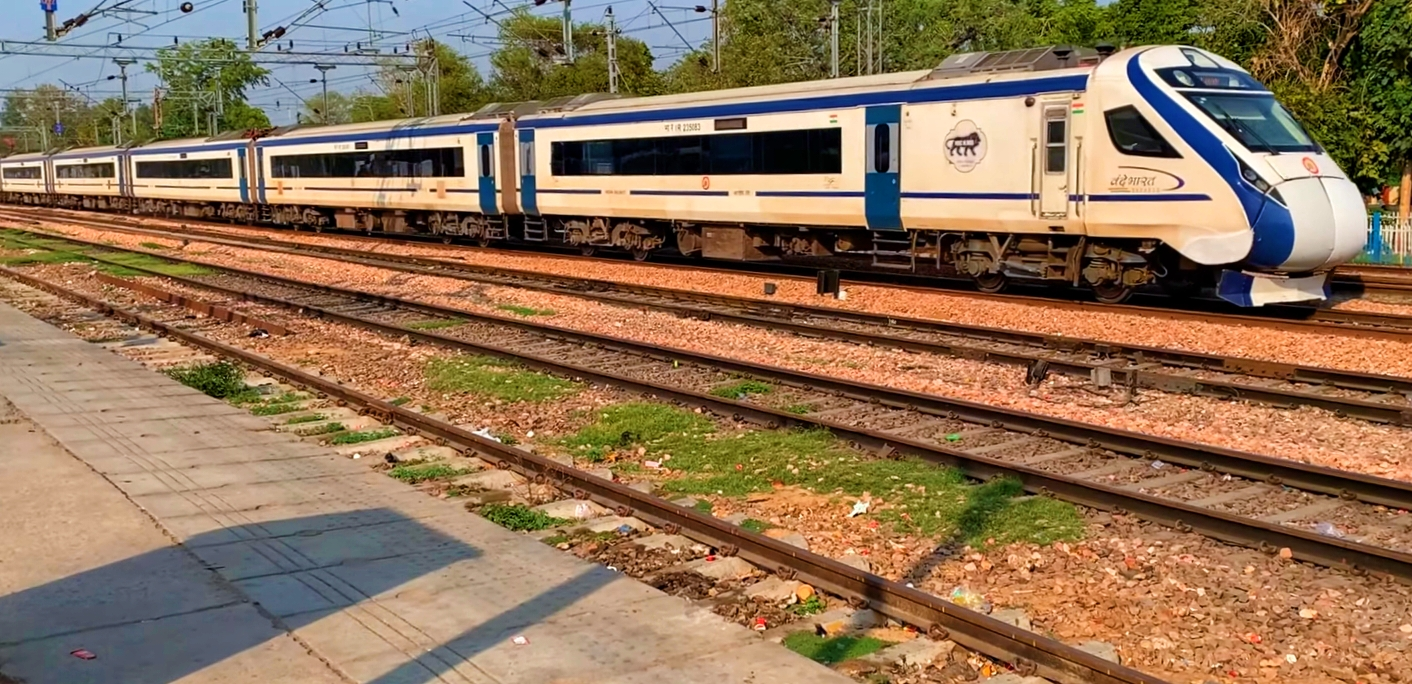
- Rani Kamalapati - Hazrat Nizamuddin Vande Bharat Express Skipping At Mathura Junction

Overview
- Service type: Vande Bharat Express
- Locale: Madhya Pradesh, Rajasthan, Uttar Pradesh and Delhi
- First service: 1 April 2023 (Inaugural run); 2 April 2023; 3 years ago (Commercial run)
- Current operator: West Central Railways (WCR)

Route
- Termini: Rani Kamalapati (RKMP); Hazrat Nizamuddin (NZM)
- Stops: Agra Cantt, Gwalior Junction and Jhansi Junction railway station
- Distance travelled: 702 km (436 mi)
- Average journey time: 07 hrs 30 mins
- Service frequency: Six days a week (Note: Except Saturdays)
- Train number: 20171 / 20172
- Line used: Rani Kamlapati - Hazrat Nizamuddin line

On-board services
- Classes: AC Chair Car, AC Executive Chair Car
- Seating arrangements: Airline style; Rotatable seats
- Sleeping arrangements: No
- Catering facilities: On-board catering
- Observation facilities: Large windows in all coaches
- Entertainment facilities: On-board WiFi; Infotainment System; Electric outlets; Reading light; Seat Pockets; Bottle Holder; Tray Table
- Baggage facilities: Overhead racks
- Other facilities: Kavach

Technical
- Rolling stock: Vande Bharat 2.0
- Track gauge: Indian gauge 1,676 mm (5 ft 6 in) broad gauge
- Electrification: 25 kV 50 Hz AC Overhead line
- Operating speed: 160 km/h (99 mph) Maximum speed 94 km/h (58 mph) Average speed
- Average length: 384 metres (1,260 ft) (16 coaches)
- Track owner: Indian Railways
- Rake maintenance: Rani Kamalapati

The 20171/20172 Rani Kamalapati - Hazrat Nizamuddin Vande Bharat Express is India's 11th and the fastest Vande Bharat Express train in service, connecting the states of Madhya Pradesh, Uttar Pradesh and New Delhi with a maximum permissible speed of 160 km/h (99 mph). It is the second fastest train of India.

== Overview ==
This train is operated by Indian Railways, connecting Rani Kamalapati (Habibganj), Virangana Lakshmibai Jhansi Jn, Gwalior Jn, Agra Cantt. and Hazrat Nizamuddin. It is currently operated with train numbers 20171/20172 on 6 days a week basis except Saturday.

== Rakes ==
It is the ninth 2nd Generation Vande Bharat Express train and was designed and manufactured by the Integral Coach Factory (ICF) under the leadership of Sudhanshu Mani at Perambur, Chennai under the Make in India initiative.

== Service ==
The 20171/20172 Rani Kamalapati - Hazrat Nizamuddin Vande Bharat Express operates six days a week except Saturdays, covering a distance of 702 km (436 mi) in a travel time of 7 hours with an average speed of 92 km/h (57 mph). The service has 3 intermediate stops. The Maximum Permissible Speed is 130 km/h (81 mph).

== Incidents ==
On 28 March 2023, days before its launch, the train met with a cattle incident, which damaged the nose cone of the train. This incident took place when it was conducting trial runs ahead of its scheduled launch on 1 April 2023. No casualties were reported during this incident.

On 21 April 2023, another cattle hit happened near Gwalior during a regular service towards Bhopal, resulting in damage to the train's front portion.

On 17 July 2023, fire broke out in the battery box of one of the coaches near Bina Junction railway station. No casualty was reported.

== See also ==
- Vande Bharat Express
- Tejas Express
- Gatimaan Express
- Hazrat Nizamuddin railway station
- Rani Kamalapati railway station
