= Kalaburagi–SMVT Bengaluru Vande Bharat Express =

Mini Vande Bharat Express train route in India

Kalaburagi (Gulbarga) - SMVT Bengaluru Vande Bharat Express
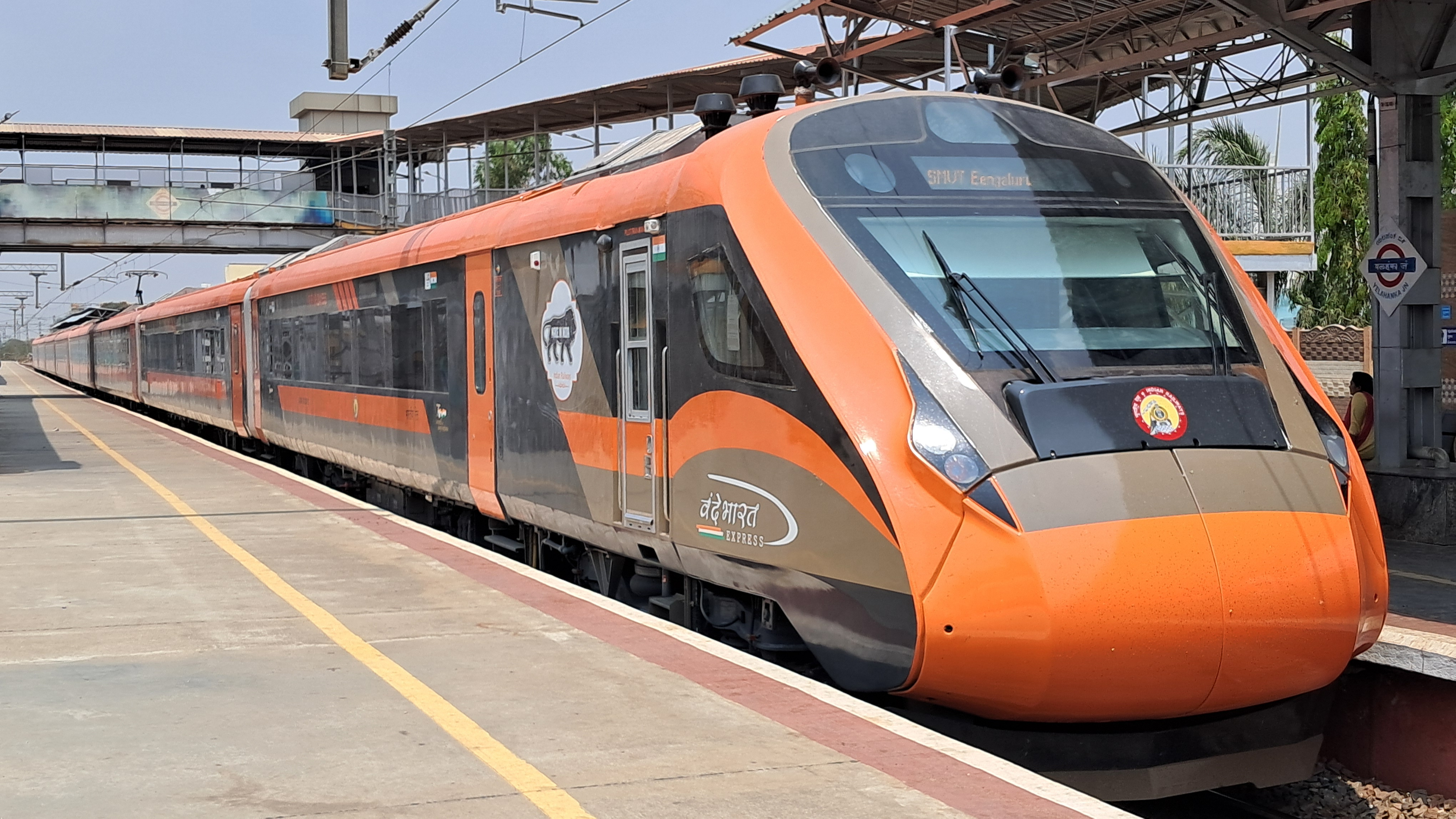
- Saffron-Grey Mini Vande Bharat Express train at Yelahanka Jn

Overview
- Service type: Vande Bharat Express
- Locale: Karnataka and Andhra Pradesh
- First service: 12 March 2024 (Inaugural); 15 March 2024; 2 years ago (Commercial)
- Current operator: Central Railways (CR)

Route
- Termini: Kalaburagi Junction (KLBG); SMVT Bengaluru (SMVT)
- Stops: 7
- Distance travelled: 548 km (341 mi)
- Average journey time: 07 hrs 45 mins
- Service frequency: Six days a week (Note: Except Thursdays)
- Train number: 22231 / 22232
- Line used: SMVT Bengaluru - Yelahanka Junction Line Yelahanka Junction - Penukonda - Sri Sathya Sai Prashanthi Nilayam - Dharmavaram Junction Line Dharmavaram Junction - Kalluru Junction - Guntakal Junction Line Guntakal Junction - Wadi Junction - Kalaburagi Junction Line (part of Chennai - Mumbai Main Line)

On-board services
- Classes: AC Chair Car, AC Executive Chair Car
- Seating arrangements: Airline style; Rotatable seats
- Sleeping arrangements: No
- Catering facilities: On board Catering
- Observation facilities: Large windows in all coaches
- Entertainment facilities: On-board WiFi; Infotainment System; Electric outlets; Reading light; Seat Pockets; Bottle Holder; Tray Table
- Baggage facilities: Overhead racks
- Other facilities: Kavach

Technical
- Rolling stock: Mini Vande Bharat 2.0
- Track gauge: Indian gauge 1,676 mm (5 ft 6 in) broad gauge
- Electrification: 25 kV 50 Hz AC Overhead line
- Operating speed: 63 km/h (39 mph) (Avg.)
- Average length: 192 metres (630 ft) (08 coaches)
- Track owner: Indian Railways
- Rake maintenance: (TBC)

The 22231/22232 Kalaburagi (Gulbarga) - SMVT Bengaluru Vande Bharat Express is India's 42nd Vande Bharat Express train, connecting the city of Kalaburagi with the capital Bengaluru in Karnataka. This express train was inaugurated by Prime Minister Narendra Modi via video conferencing from Ahmedabad on 12 March 2024.

This train service will be running with an additional halt at Yadgir railway station which was flagged off by Minister of State V. Somanna on 3 August 2024 via video conferencing from Bengaluru DRM Office.

== Overview ==
This train is operated by Indian Railways, connecting Kalaburagi Jn, Yadgir, Raichur Jn, Mantralayam Road, Guntakal Jn, Anantapur, Sri Sathya Sai Prasanthi Nilayam ,Yelahanka Jn and SMVT Bengaluru. It is currently operated with train numbers 22231/22232 on 6 days a week basis.

== Rakes ==
It is the fortieth 2nd Generation and twenty-sixth Mini Vande Bharat 2.0 Express train which was designed and manufactured by the Integral Coach Factory at Perambur, Chennai under the Make in India Initiative.

== Service ==
The 22231/22232 Kalaburagi Jn - SMVT Bengaluru Vande Bharat Express operates six days a week except Fridays, covering a distance of 558 km (347 mi) in a travel time of 8 hours with an average speed of 63 km/h (39 mph). The Maximum Permissible Speed is 130 km/h (81 mph) and is achieved on the Dharmavaram Jn - Kalluru Jn section and once more on the Guntakal Junction - Wadi Junction section

== See also ==
- Vande Bharat Express
- Tejas Express
- Gatimaan Express
- Kalaburagi railway station
- Sir M. Visvesvaraya Terminal
