= Chennai Egmore–Nagercoil Junction Vande Bharat Express =

Vande Bharat Express train route in India

Chennai Egmore - Nagercoil Junction Vande Bharat Express

Overview
- Service type: Vande Bharat Express
- Locale: Tamil Nadu
- First service: August 31, 2024 (Inaugural); 02 September 2024; 13 months ago (Commercial)
- Current operator: Southern Railways (SR)

Route
- Termini: Chennai Egmore (MS); Nagercoil Junction (NCJ)
- Stops: 7
- Distance travelled: 724 km (450 mi)
- Average journey time: 08 hrs 40 mins
- Service frequency: Six days a week (Note: Except Wednesdays)
- Train number: 20627 / 20628
- Lines used: Chennai - Villupuram line Chord Line; Madurai–Tirunelveli line

On-board services
- Class(es): AC Chair Car, AC Executive Chair Car
- Seating arrangements: Airline style; Rotatable seats
- Sleeping arrangements: No
- Catering facilities: On board Catering
- Observation facilities: Large windows in all coaches
- Entertainment facilities: On-board WiFi; Infotainment System; Electric outlets; Reading light; Seat Pockets; Bottle Holder; Tray Table
- Baggage facilities: Overhead racks
- Other facilities: Kavach

Technical
- Rolling stock: Vande Bharat 2.0 (Last service: May 06 2025); Vande Bharat 3.0 (First service: May 08 2025)
- Track gauge: Indian gauge 1,676 mm (5 ft 6 in) broad gauge
- Electrification: 25 kV 50 Hz AC Overhead line
- Operating speed: 84 km/h (52 mph) (Avg.)
- Average length: 480 metres (1,570 ft) (20 coaches)
- Track owner: Indian Railways
- Rake maintenance: Basin Bridge Junction (BBQ)

The 20627/20628 Chennai Egmore – Nagercoil Junction Vande Bharat Express is India's 52nd Vande Bharat Express train, which runs across the state of Tamil Nadu, by connecting the metropolitan city of Chennai and terminating at the Temple of Nagas town, Nagercoil. This express train was slated to be inaugurated on June 20, 2024, but was postponed due to administrative reasons.

This express train was inaugurated on 31 August 2024 by Prime Minister Narendra Modi via video conferencing from New Delhi.

== Overview ==
This express train is operated by Indian Railways, connecting Chennai Egmore, Tambaram, Villupuram Jn, Trichy Jn, Dindigul Jn, Madurai Jn, Kovilpatti, Tirunelveli Jn and Nagercoil Junction. It is currently operated on a 6 days a week basis with train numbers 20627/20628.

== Rakes ==
It was the fiftieth 2nd Generation Vande Bharat Express train which was designed and manufactured by the Integral Coach Factory at Perambur, Chennai under the Make in India Initiative. It was the first Vande Bharat running within Tamil Nadu to run with 16 coaches.

Due to its ultimate demand, it was converted to run the services from 16 coaches to 20 coaches from 8 May 2025. Thus this express train becomes the first 20 coach train, the longest Vande Bharat Express train to run within Tamil Nadu and the third longest express train across all 66 train services after New Delhi–Varanasi and Varanasi–New Delhi Vande Bharat Express trains.

== Service ==
The 20627/20628 Chennai Egmore - Nagercoil Jn Vande Bharat Express operates six days a week except Wednesdays, covering a distance of 724 km (450 mi) in a travel time of 8 hours with an average speed of 82 km/h (51 mph). The service has 7 intermediate stops. The Maximum Permissible Speed is 130 km/h (81 mph).

== See also ==
- Vande Bharat Express
- Tejas Express
- Gatimaan Express
- Chennai Egmore railway station
- Nagercoil Junction railway station
