= Vande Bharat Express =

Series of Indian semi-high speed EMU train services

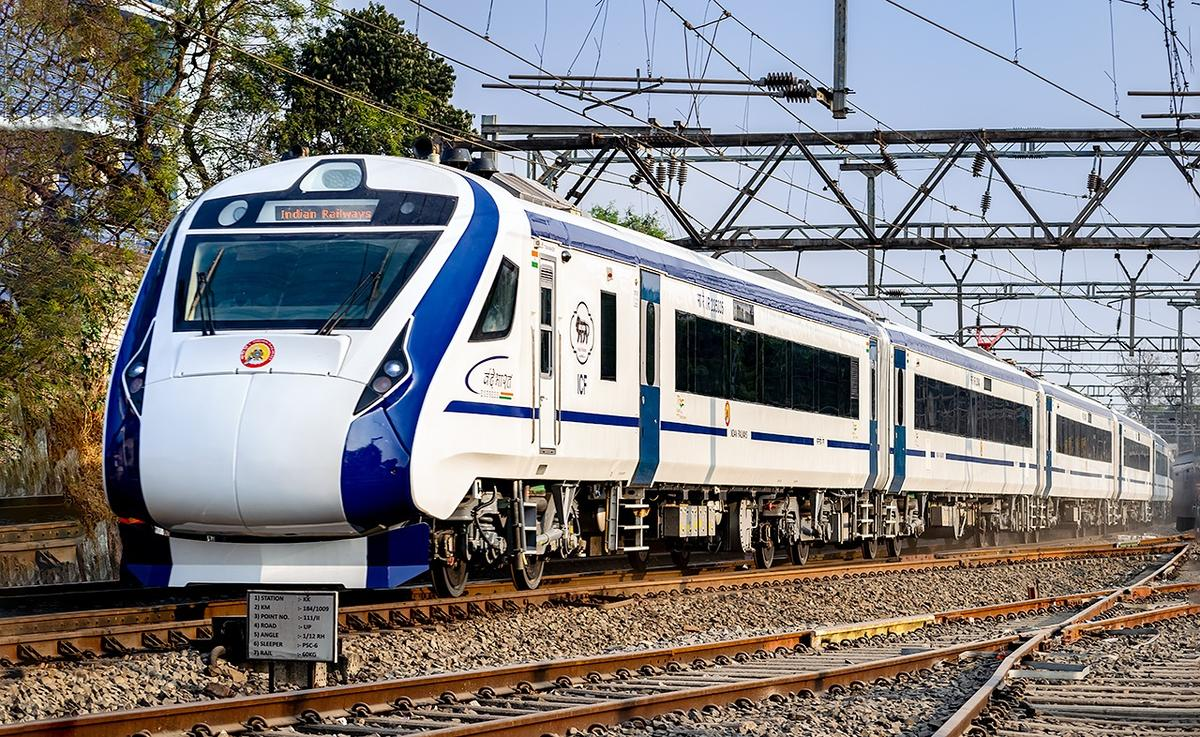
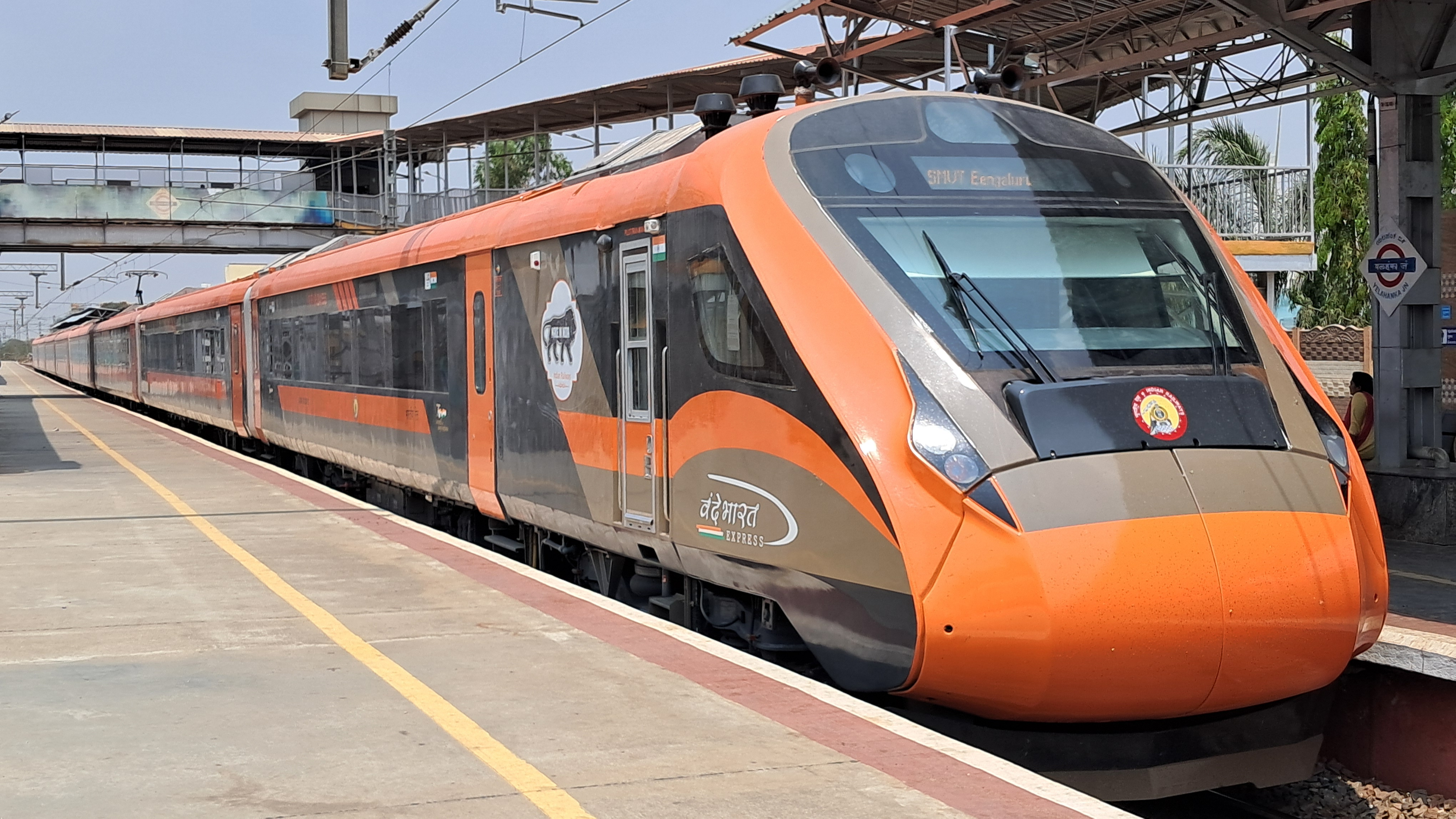
- Vande Bharat Express trains in different liveries

Overview
- Service type: Inter-city semi-high-speed rail
- Status: Operating
- Locale: India
- Predecessor: Shatabdi Express
- First service: 15 February 2019; 7 years ago
- Website: indianrail.gov.in

Route
- Line used: 79

On-board services
- Classes: AC Executive Class (EC); Chair Car (CC)
- Disabled access: Yes
- Seating arrangements: Rotating cross seats (EC); Cross seats (CC)
- Catering facilities: On-board catering
- Observation facilities: Wide fixed windows
- Entertainment facilities: Electric outlets; infotainment system; reading light; Wi-Fi
- Baggage facilities: Overhead racks
- Other facilities: Airconditioning; Automatic doors; Bio-vacuum toilets; CCTV; Odour control; Roller blinds; Sensor-based water taps; Smoke alarms

Technical
- Rolling stock: Vande Bharat
- Track gauge: 1,676 mm (5 ft 6 in) broad gauge
- Electrification: 25 kV 50 Hz AC via overhead line
- Operating speed: 160 km/h (99 mph) (maximum); 83 km/h (52 mph) (average)
- Average length: 192 m (630 ft) (8 coaches); 384 m (1,260 ft) (16 coaches); 480 m (1,570 ft) (20 coaches)
- Track owner: Indian Railways

Vande Bharat Express is a medium to long-distance semi-high speed express train service operated by the Indian Railways. It is a reserved, air-conditioned chair car service connecting cities that are less than 800 km (500 mi) apart or take less than ten hours to travel with existing services. The first commercial service of Vande Bharat was officially inaugurated on 15 February 2019 by Prime Minister Narendra Modi.

The trainsets are self-propelling electric multiple units (EMUs) in eight, sixteen or twenty coach configurations. They were introduced as part of the Make in India initiative by the Indian government, and are designed and manufactured by the state-owned Integral Coach Factory in Chennai. Introduced in 2018, the trainsets achieved speeds up to 183 km/h (114 mph) during trial runs. However, the maximum operational speed is restricted to 160 km/h (99 mph), which is achieved by the Rani Kamalapati–Hazrat Nizamuddin and Hazrat Nizamuddin-Khajuraho services on the Tughlakabad–Agra section. This is the highest operational speed on the Indian Railways network, shared with Gatimaan Express over the same section. The train is capable of faster acceleration and deceleration, and it went from 0 to 100 km/h in 52 seconds during trial runs.

Vande Bharat sleeper services operating dedicated sleeper trainsets, were inaugurated in January 2026. These trains consist of sixteen air-conditioned sleeper coaches.

== History ==
=== Efforts to increase speed ===
In 1960, the Indian Railway Board commissioned a study to increase the speed of its trains, which was restricted to 96 km/h (60 mph) on the existent broad gauge lines. The Research Design and Standards Organisation was tasked with achieving a target speed of 160 km/h (99 mph) and an intermediate target of 120 km/h (75 mph) for passenger trains. Rajdhani Express trains, capable of reaching speeds of up to 120 km/h (75 mph), were introduced in 1969. The Integral Coach Factory (ICF) at Madras manufactured the coaches, which were hauled by diesel locomotives. With the introduction of WAP-1 electric locomotives, Shatabdi Express trains, introduced in 1988, were capable of running at a maximum speed of 130 km/h (81 mph). From the late 1990s, the ICF coaches began to be replaced by the safer LHB coaches designed by Linke-Hofmann-Busch of Germany.

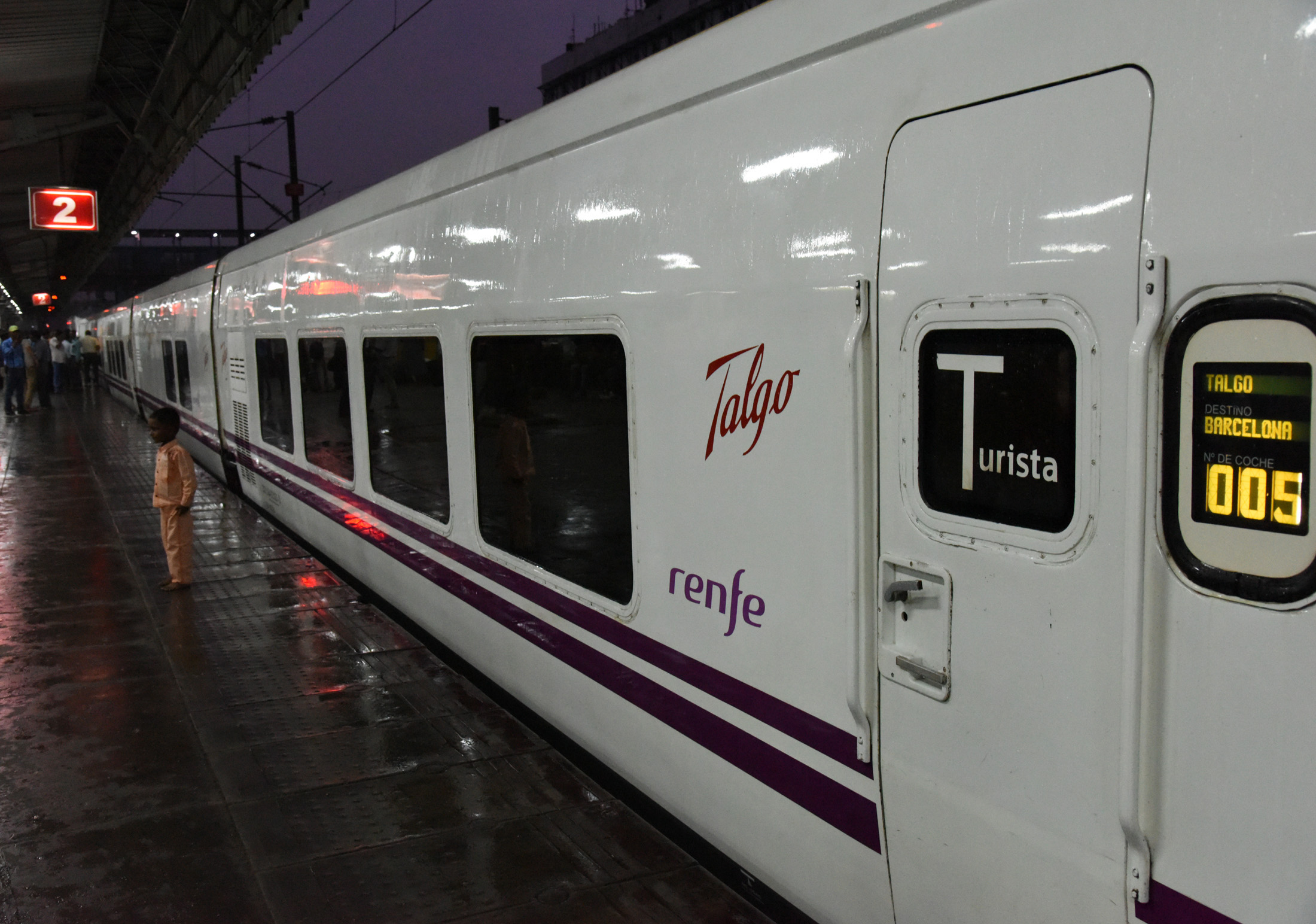
Talgo train at New Delhi railway station during trials in 2016

In December 2009, the Ministry of Railways of the Government of India envisaged the implementation of high-speed rail projects to provide passenger services at 250–350 km/h (160–220 mph) through the upgradation of existing tracks, construction of new lines and introduction of high speed trainsets. In the 2014 railway budget, a proposal was made to introduce services operating at a speed of 160–200 km/h (99–124 mph) connecting major cities. Gatimaan Express, introduced in 2016, achieved speeds of 160 km/h (99 mph) in a sector between Delhi and Agra.

In the mid-2010s, the Indian Railways sought request for qualifications to jointly manufacture five thousand electric multiple units sets with interested international and domestic parties. In 2015, Talgo conducted trial runs on the Delhi–Mumbai line, completing the journey in ten hours, almost six hours quicker than the existing fastest train and achieved an average speed of 117.5 km/h (73.0 mph). However, the deal never materialised due to concerns such as the adaptability of rolling stock, higher procurement and maintenance costs and robustness.

=== Vande Bharat trainset ===
After foreign proposals for the proposed semi-high-speed trains were unsuccessful, the government decided to develop the trainsets locally as a part of the Make in India campaign. A team led by Sudhanshu Mani worked on the development of the trainset at ICF. The prototypes were tested in 2018 and reached speeds of up to 183 km/h (114 mph) in trials. Christened as Train 18 initially, these trainsets were later renamed to Vande Bharat.

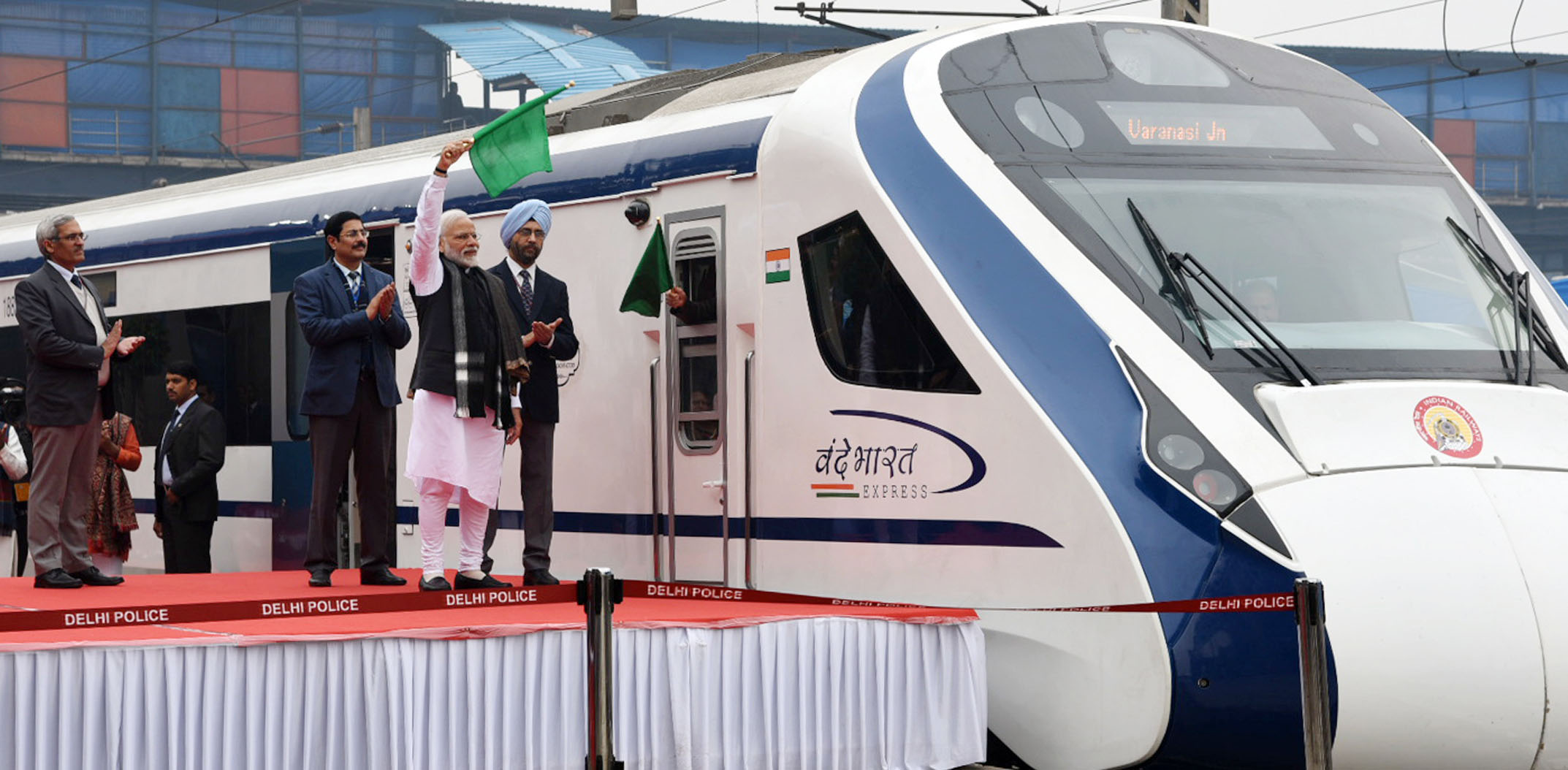
Inauguration of the first commercial service from New Delhi to Varanasi by the prime minister on 15 February 2019

On 15 February 2019, the first Vande Bharat Express, plying between New Delhi and Varanasi, was flagged off at the New Delhi railway station by the Indian prime minister Narendra Modi. The train covered a distance of 759 km (472 mi) in eight hours at an average speed of 95 km/h (59 mph) and reduced the existing travel time along the route by 15%. In October 2019, the second service was launched between New Delhi and Katra.

After the inauguration of the first two services, the Indian Railways temporarily halted the production of new train-sets owing to internal issues. In 2019, the production resumed after a lower cost revision was agreed for the upgrades required. The second generation trainsets entered service in September 2022. In December 2023, the Government announced a target to have 4,500 Vande Bharat trains by 2047. As the Vande Bharat trains operated faster services connecting cities, the trains were planned to eventually replace the existing Shatabdi and Rajdhani express trains.

The ICF was involved in the development a new version of the Vande Bharat trainset equipped with air-conditioned sleeper cars. The first prototype was rolled out by BEML in September 2024, and commercial services began in January 2026.

== Rolling stock ==
Vande Bharat Express uses electric multiple units trainsets manufactured by the Integral Coach Factory in Chennai. The trainsets have eight, sixteen or twenty chair cars. A standard sixteen car rake consists of two driving trailer coaches, one each on every end along with two non-driver trailer coaches, four trailer coaches with pantographs and eight motor coaches. A second generation sixteen car trainset weighs 392 tonnes and costs ₹115 crore (US$12 million). The chassis of a coach is 23 m (75 ft) long, and is made of stainless steel.

During the trial runs, the trainsets had clocked speeds of up to 183 km/h (114 mph) with an acceleration of 0–100 km/h (0–62 mph) in 52 seconds. The operational speed is limited due to track restrictions, halts and traffic congestion. The maximum operational speed of 160 km/h (99 mph) is achieved by the Rani Kamalapati (Habibganj)–Hazrat Nizamuddin Vande Bharat Express and Hazrat Nizamuddin-Khajuraho Vande Bharat Express on the 174 km (108 mi) Tughlakabad–Agra section.

== Facilities ==
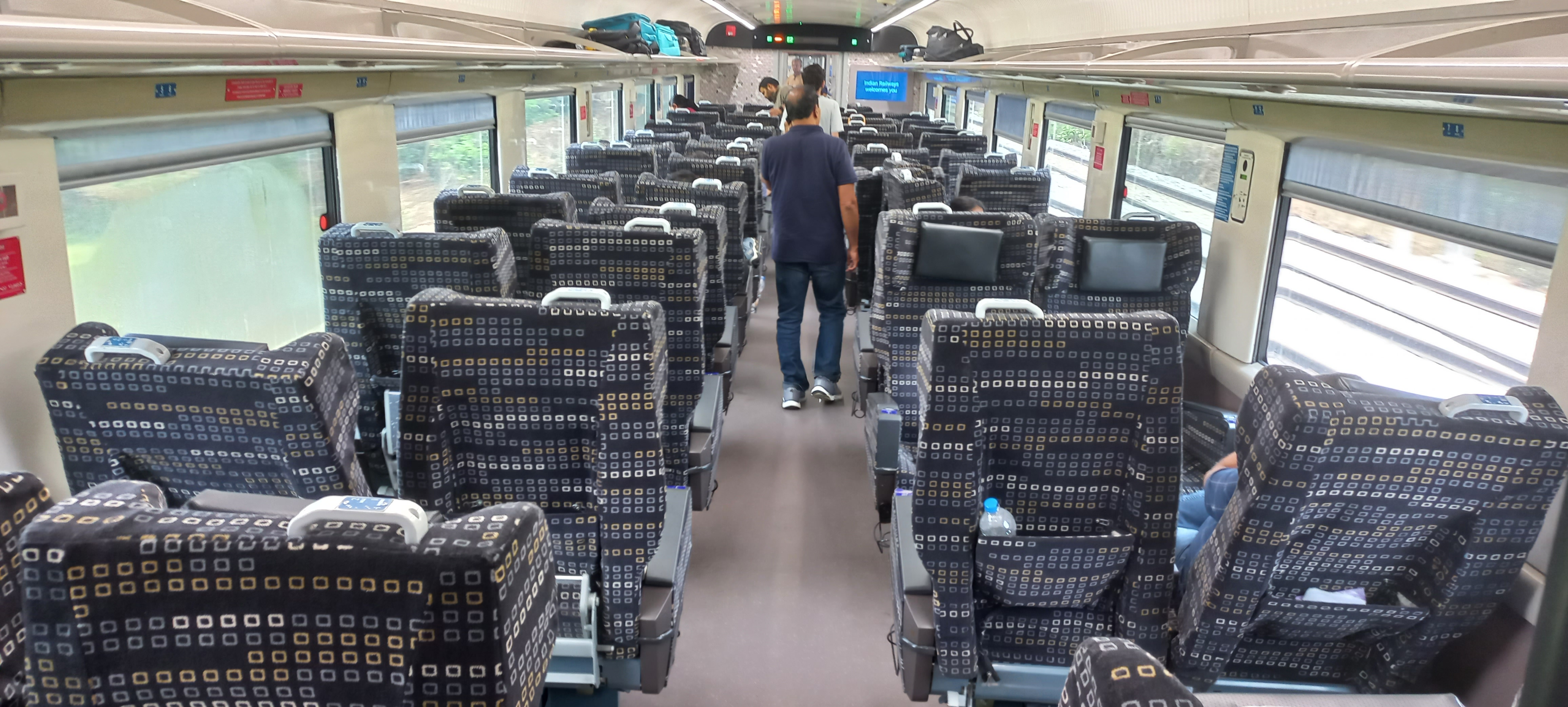
AC Executive Class (EC)

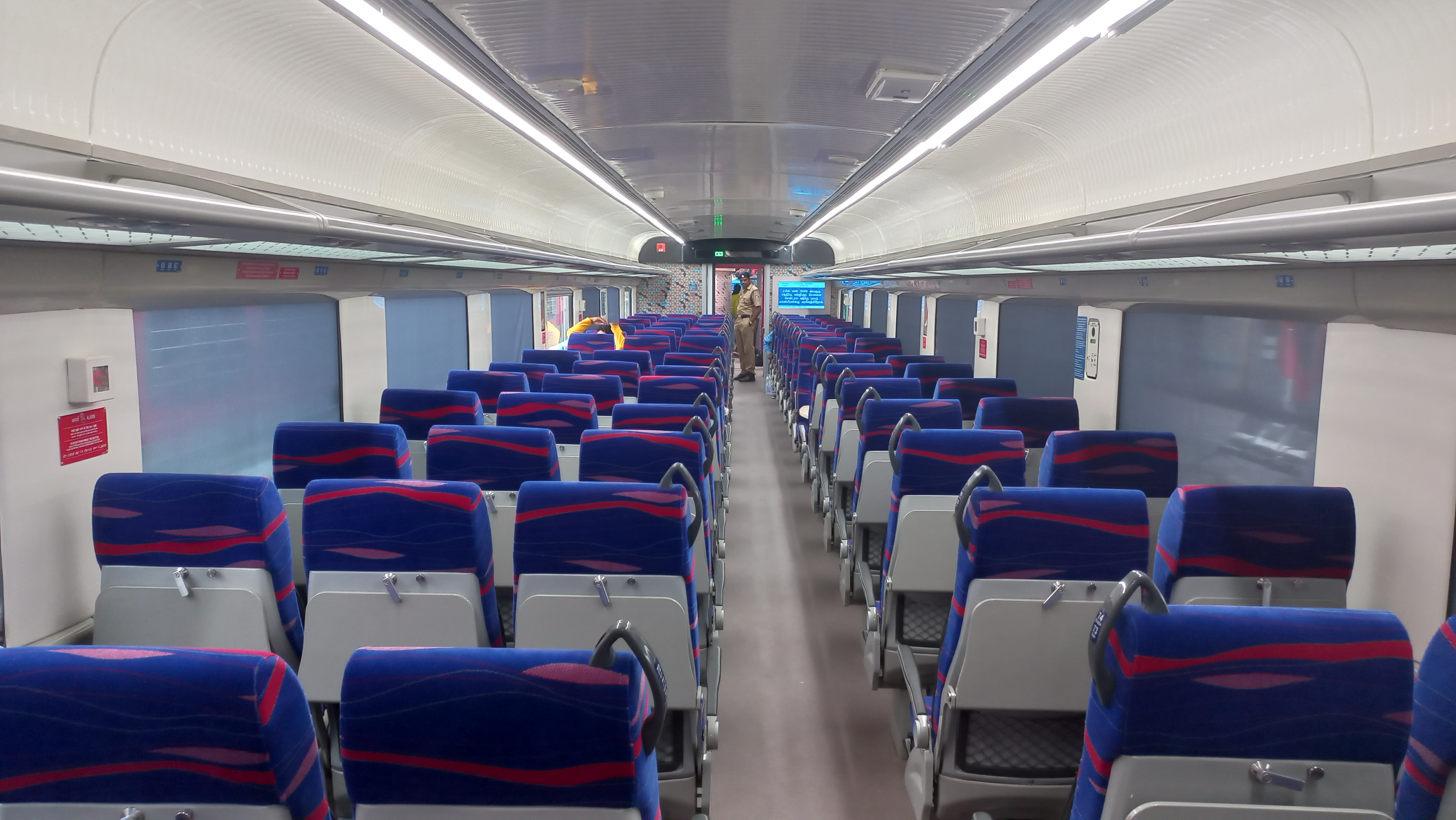
AC Chair Car (CC)

The train has two classes of accommodation with the AC Chair Car being the standard class and the AC Executive Class being the premium class. The executive class coach can seat 52 passengers and is equipped with rotating seats in a 2x2 configuration. The chair car coaches can seat 78 passengers per coach (limited to 44 in first and last trailer coaches) and are equipped with retractable seats in 2x3 configuration. The coaches are fully air conditioned and equipped with electric outlets, reading lights, CCTV cameras, automatic doors, bio-vacuum toilets, sensor-based water taps and Passenger information system. The coaches have wide windows with roller blinds and overhead racks for stowing luggage. The service offers onboard catering with both vegetarian and non-vegetarian meal options included in the fare as standard.

== Services ==
The first service was introduced in February 2019.

As of 17 August 2026, 81 Vande Bharat trains are in service, which includes 22 twenty-car services, 18 sixteen-car services and 39 eight-car services.

As of July 2026, 79 pairs of Vande Bharat Chair car trains are in service across the country, covering 79 distinct routes. Two routes—Tatanagar–Patna and Jammu Tawi–Srinagar—are served by two pairs of Vande Bharat services each.

On 15 November 2026, the Yeshwantpur–Madgaon Vande Bharat Express (trains 26655/26656) began regular commercial services via Mangalore, replacing the Mangalore Central–Margao service (trains 20645/20646), which made its final run on 14 November 2026. Covering 671 km with 16 coaches, it is the longest Vande Bharat chair car service in the country.

Service	Zone	Cars	Distance	Travel time	Speed		Inaugural run
Service	Zone	Cars	Distance	Travel time	Maximum (Note: Maximum permissible speed over different sections as approved by the Commissioner of Railway Safety)	Average	Inaugural run
New Delhi–Varanasi	NR	20	759 km (472 mi)	8h	130 km/h (81 mph)	95 km/h (59 mph)	15 February 2019
New Delhi–SMVD Katra	NR	20	655 km (407 mi)	8h 05m	130 km/h (81 mph)	81 km/h (50 mph)	3 October 2019
Mumbai Central–Gandhinagar Capital	WR	20	522 km (324 mi)	6h 25m	130 km/h (81 mph)	81 km/h (50 mph)	30 September 2022
New Delhi–Amb Andaura	NR	16	437 km (272 mi)	5h 20m	130 km/h (81 mph)	79 km/h (49 mph)	13 October 2022
Chennai Central–Mysuru	SR	16	496 km (308 mi)	6h 30m	130 km/h (81 mph)	76 km/h (47 mph)	11 November 2022
Bilaspur–Nagpur	SECR	16	412 km (256 mi)	5h 30m	130 km/h (81 mph)	75 km/h (47 mph)	11 December 2022
Howrah–New Jalpaiguri	ER	16	566 km (352 mi)	7h 30m	130 km/h (81 mph)	75 km/h (47 mph)	30 December 2022
Visakhapatnam–Secunderabad	SCoR	20	698 km (434 mi)	8h 35m	130 km/h (81 mph)	81 km/h (50 mph)	15 January 2023
Mumbai CSMT–Solapur	CR	20	457 km (284 mi)	6h 30m	130 km/h (81 mph)	70 km/h (43 mph)	10 February 2023
Mumbai CSMT–Sainagar Shirdi	CR	16	343 km (213 mi)	5h 10m	130 km/h (81 mph)	66 km/h (41 mph)	10 February 2023
Rani Kamalapati (Habibganj)–Hazrat Nizamuddin	WCR	16	702 km (436 mi)	7h 36m	160 km/h (99 mph)	92 km/h (57 mph)	1 April 2023
Secunderabad–Tirupati	SCR	20	662 km (411 mi)	8h 19m	130 km/h (81 mph)	80 km/h (50 mph)	8 April 2023
Chennai Central–Coimbatore	SR	8	495 km (308 mi)	6h	130 km/h (81 mph)	82 km/h (51 mph)	8 April 2023
Ajmer–Chandigarh	NWR	20	678 km (421 mi)	8h 25m	130 km/h (81 mph)	81 km/h (50 mph)	12 April 2023
Kasaragod–Thiruvananthapuram	SR	20	586 km (364 mi)	8h 10m	110 km/h (68 mph)	72 km/h (45 mph)	25 April 2023
Howrah–Puri	SER	20	500 km (310 mi)	6h 25m	130 km/h (81 mph)	78 km/h (48 mph)	18 May 2023
Dehradun–Anand Vihar Terminal	NR	8	302 km (188 mi)	4h 45m	110 km/h (68 mph)	64 km/h (40 mph)	25 May 2023
New Jalpaiguri–Guwahati	NFR	8	407 km (253 mi)	5h 30m	110 km/h (68 mph)	74 km/h (46 mph)	29 May 2023
Mumbai CSMT–Madgaon	CR	8	580 km (360 mi)	7h 45m	120 km/h (75 mph)	75 km/h (47 mph)	27 June 2023
Patna–Ranchi	ECR	8	380 km (240 mi)	6h	130 km/h (81 mph)	63 km/h (39 mph)	27 June 2023
KSR Bengaluru–Dharwad	SWR	8	490 km (300 mi)	6h 25m	110 km/h (68 mph)	76 km/h (47 mph)	27 June 2023
Rani Kamalapati (Habibganj)–Rewa	WCR	8	568 km (353 mi)	8h	110 km/h (68 mph)	71 km/h (44 mph)	27 June 2023
Indore–Nagpur	WR	16	636 km (395 mi)	8h 20m	130 km/h (81 mph)	76 km/h (47 mph)	27 June 2023
Jodhpur–Sabarmati (Ahmedabad)	NWR	8	449 km (279 mi)	6h	130 km/h (81 mph)	75 km/h (47 mph)	7 July 2023
Gorakhpur–Prayagraj	NER	16	500 km (310 mi)	7h 25m	110 km/h (68 mph)	67 km/h (42 mph)	7 July 2023
Chennai Central–Narasapur	SR	8	653 km (406 mi)	8h 40m	130 km/h (81 mph)	75 km/h (47 mph)	24 September 2023
Chennai Egmore–Tirunelveli	SR	20	650 km (400 mi)	7h 50m	110 km/h (68 mph)	83 km/h (52 mph)	24 September 2023
Kacheguda–Yesvantpur	SCR	16	612 km (380 mi)	8h 15m	130 km/h (81 mph)	74 km/h (46 mph)	24 September 2023
Patna–Howrah	ECR	20	532 km (331 mi)	6h 35m	130 km/h (81 mph)	81 km/h (50 mph)	24 September 2023
Ranchi–Howrah	SER	8	458 km (285 mi)	7h 10m	130 km/h (81 mph)	64 km/h (40 mph)	24 September 2023
Puri–Rourkela	ECoR	16	506 km (314 mi)	7h 45m	130 km/h (81 mph)	65 km/h (40 mph)	24 September 2023
Mangaluru Central–Thiruvananthapuram	SWR	20	620 km (390 mi)	8h 40m	110 km/h (68 mph)	72 km/h (45 mph)	24 September 2023
Ahmedabad–Okha	WR	8	499 km (310 mi)	6h 30m	110 km/h (68 mph)	77 km/h (48 mph)	24 September 2023
Varanasi–New Delhi	NR	20	759 km (472 mi)	8h 05m	130 km/h (81 mph)	94 km/h (58 mph)	18 December 2023
Anand Vihar Terminal–Ayodhya Cantt.	NR	20	629 km (391 mi)	8h 20m	130 km/h (81 mph)	75 km/h (47 mph)	30 December 2023
SMVD Katra–New Delhi	NR	20	655 km (407 mi)	8h 10m	130 km/h (81 mph)	80 km/h (50 mph)	30 December 2023
Amritsar–Delhi Junction	NR	16	447 km (278 mi)	5h 30m	130 km/h (81 mph)	81 km/h (50 mph)	30 December 2023
Coimbatore–Bengaluru Cantt.	SR	8	374 km (232 mi)	6h 25m	110 km/h (68 mph)	58 km/h (36 mph)	30 December 2023
Hazur Sahib Nanded–Mumbai CSMT	SCR	20	609 km (378 mi)	9h 40m	130 km/h (81 mph)	64 km/h (40 mph)	30 December 2023
Kalaburagi–SMVT Bengaluru	CR	8	548 km (341 mi)	8h 45m	130 km/h (81 mph)	63 km/h (39 mph)	12 March 2024
New Jalpaiguri–Patna	NFR	8	473 km (294 mi)	6h 55m	130 km/h (81 mph)	68 km/h (42 mph)	12 March 2024
Lucknow–Dehradun	NER	16	545 km (339 mi)	8h 20m	110 km/h (68 mph)	65 km/h (40 mph)	12 March 2024
Ahmedabad–Mumbai Central	WR	20	493 km (306 mi)	5h 25m	130 km/h (81 mph)	91 km/h (57 mph)	12 March 2024
Mysuru–Chennai Central	SWR	8	497 km (309 mi)	6h 25m	130 km/h (81 mph)	77 km/h (48 mph)	12 March 2024
Hazrat Nizamuddin–Khajuraho	NR	16	660 km (410 mi)	8h 20m	160 km/h (99 mph)	79 km/h (49 mph)	12 March 2024
Secunderabad–Visakhapatnam	SCR	20	698 km (434 mi)	8h 45m	130 km/h (81 mph)	80 km/h (50 mph)	12 March 2024
Ranchi–Varanasi	SER	8	539 km (335 mi)	7h 50m	130 km/h (81 mph)	69 km/h (43 mph)	12 March 2024
Bhubaneswar–Visakhapatnam	ECoR	8	444 km (276 mi)	5h 45m	130 km/h (81 mph)	77 km/h (48 mph)	12 March 2024
Patna–Gomti Nagar (Lucknow)	ECR	8	545 km (339 mi)	8h 25m	130 km/h (81 mph)	65 km/h (40 mph)	12 March 2024
Chennai Egmore–Nagercoil	SR	20	724 km (450 mi)	8h 50m	110 km/h (68 mph)	82 km/h (51 mph)	31 August 2024
Madurai–Bengaluru Cantt.	SR	16	573 km (356 mi)	7h 45m	130 km/h (81 mph)	74 km/h (46 mph)	31 August 2024
Meerut City–Varanasi	NR	8	782 km (486 mi)	11h 55m	110 km/h (68 mph)	65 km/h (40 mph)	31 August 2024
Tatanagar–Patna	SER	8	451 km (280 mi)	7h 15m	130 km/h (81 mph)	62 km/h (39 mph)	15 September 2024
Tatanagar–Brahmapur	SER	8	587 km (365 mi)	9h 05m	130 km/h (81 mph)	65 km/h (40 mph)	15 September 2024
Howrah–Rourkela	SER	16	412 km (256 mi)	5h 50m	130 km/h (81 mph)	71 km/h (44 mph)	15 September 2024
Howrah–Gaya	ER	16	459 km (285 mi)	5h 45m	130 km/h (81 mph)	81 km/h (50 mph)	15 September 2024
Howrah–Jamalpur	ER	8	441 km (274 mi)	6h 35m	130 km/h (81 mph)	65 km/h (40 mph)	15 September 2024
Varanasi–Deoghar	NR	8	456 km (283 mi)	7h 20m	130 km/h (81 mph)	62 km/h (39 mph)	15 September 2024
SSS Hubballi–Pune	SWR	8	559 km (347 mi)	8h 30m	110 km/h (68 mph)	66 km/h (41 mph)	16 September 2024
SCSMT Kolhapur–Pune	CR	8	326 km (203 mi)	5h 15m	110 km/h (68 mph)	62 km/h (39 mph)	16 September 2024
Agra Cantt.–Banaras	NCR	16	574 km (357 mi)	7h 00m	130 km/h (81 mph)	82 km/h (51 mph)	16 September 2024
Nagpur–Secunderabad	CR	8	581 km (361 mi)	7h 15m	130 km/h (81 mph)	80 km/h (50 mph)	16 September 2024
Durg–Visakhapatnam	SECR	8	567 km (352 mi)	8h	130 km/h (81 mph)	71 km/h (44 mph)	16 September 2024
Sabarmati (Ahmedabad)–Veraval	WR	8	439 km (273 mi)	6h 55m	110 km/h (68 mph)	62 km/h (39 mph)	26 May 2025
Jammu Tawi–Srinagar	NR	20	267 km (166 mi)	4h 50m	110 km/h (68 mph)	64 km/h (40 mph)	6 June 2025
Srinagar–Jammu Tawi	NR	20	267 km (166 mi)	4h 45m	110 km/h (68 mph)	64 km/h (40 mph)	6 June 2025
Gorakhpur–Patliputra	NER	8	384 km (239 mi)	7h	110 km/h (68 mph)	55 km/h (34 mph)	20 June 2025
Belagavi–KSR Bengaluru	SWR	8	616 km (383 mi)	8h 20m	110 km/h (68 mph)	73 km/h (45 mph)	10 August 2025
SMVD Katra–Amritsar	NR	8	368 km (229 mi)	5h 40m	110 km/h (68 mph)	65 km/h (40 mph)	10 August 2025
Ajni (Nagpur)–Pune	CR	8	882 km (548 mi)	12h	130 km/h (81 mph)	73 km/h (45 mph)	10 August 2025
Jogbani–Danapur	ECR	8	451 km (280 mi)	8h 05m	130 km/h (81 mph)	56 km/h (35 mph)	15 September 2025
Jodhpur–Delhi Cantt.	NWR	20	604 km (375 mi)	8h 05m	130 km/h (81 mph)	75 km/h (47 mph)	25 September 2025
Bikaner–Delhi Cantt.	NWR	8	447 km (278 mi)	6h 15m	110 km/h (68 mph)	72 km/h (45 mph)	25 September 2025
Banaras–Khajuraho	NER	8	465 km (289 mi)	7h 40m	130 km/h (81 mph)	61 km/h (38 mph)	8 November 2025
KSR Bengaluru–Ernakulam Junction	SWR	16	625 km (388 mi)	8h 40m	130 km/h (81 mph)	72 km/h (45 mph)	8 November 2025
Firozpur Cantt.–Delhi Junction	NR	8	487 km (303 mi)	6h 35m	130 km/h (81 mph)	74 km/h (46 mph)	8 November 2025
Gomti Nagar (Lucknow)–Saharanpur	NR	8	535 km (332 mi)	8h 40m	110 km/h (68 mph)	62 km/h (39 mph)	8 November 2025
Surat–Udaipur City	WR	8	528 km (328 mi)	7h 30m	130 km/h (81 mph)	70 km/h (43 mph)	4 October 2026
Yesvantpur–Madgaon	SWR	16	671 km (417 mi)	13h 20m	120 km/h (75 mph)	50 km/h (31 mph)	15 November 2026

== See also ==
- Future of rail transport in India
- Amrit Bharat Express – Series of express train services of Indian Railways
- High-speed rail in India
- Namo Bharat Rapid Rail – Series of Indian inter-city express train services
- Rail transport in India
