= New Delhi–Shri Mata Vaishno Devi Katra Vande Bharat Express =

Vande Bharat Express train route in India

New Delhi - Shri Mata Vaishno Devi Katra Vande Bharat Express

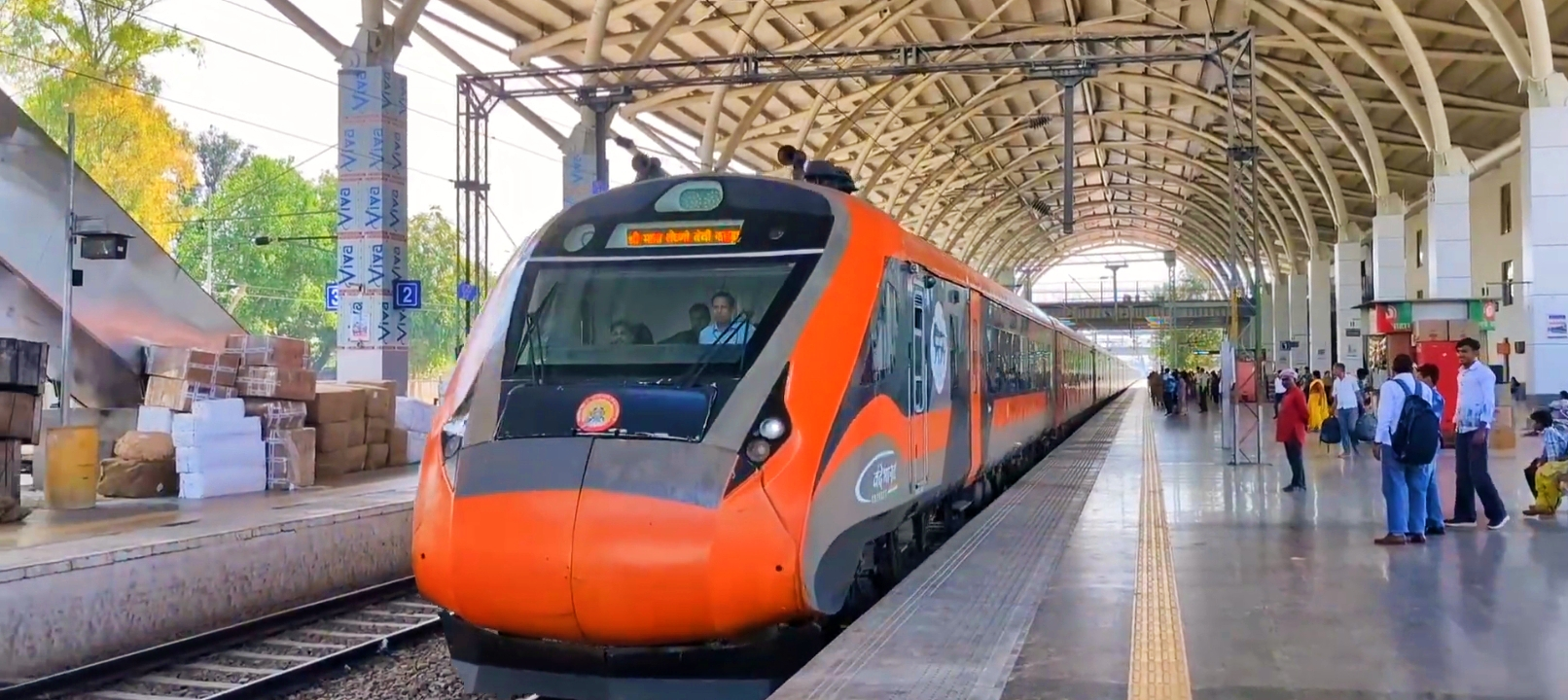
- New Delhi - SVDK Vande Bharat Express At Jalandhar Cantt Jn

Overview
- Service type: Vande Bharat Express
- Locale: Delhi, Haryana, Punjab and Jammu and Kashmir
- First service: 3 October 2019; 7 years ago
- Current operator: Northern Railways (NR)

Route
- Termini: New Delhi (NDLS); Shri Mata Vaishno Devi Katra (SVDK)
- Stops: 5
- Distance travelled: 655 km (407 mi)
- Average journey time: 08 hrs 20 mins
- Service frequency: Six days a week (Note: Except Wednesdays)
- Train number: 22439 / 22440
- Lines used: Delhi–Kalka (till Ambala Cantt.); Ambala–Amritsar line (till Jalandhar Cantt. Jn.); Jalandhar–Jammu Tawi line; Jammu Tawi - Baramulla (till Shri Mata Vaishno Devi Katra)

On-board services
- Classes: AC Chair Car, AC Executive Chair Car
- Seating arrangements: Airline style; Rotatable seats
- Sleeping arrangements: No
- Catering facilities: On-board catering
- Observation facilities: Large windows in all coaches
- Entertainment facilities: On-board WiFi; Infotainment System; Electric outlets; Reading light; Seat Pockets; Bottle Holder; Tray Table
- Baggage facilities: Overhead racks

Technical
- Rolling stock: Vande Bharat 1.0 (Last service: Jan 05 2025); Vande Bharat 3.0 (First service: Jan 06 2025)
- Track gauge: Indian gauge 1,676 mm (5 ft 6 in) broad gauge
- Electrification: 25 kV 50 Hz AC Overhead line
- Operating speed: 82 km/h (51 mph) (Avg.)
- Average length: 480 metres (1,570 ft) (20 coaches)
- Track owner: Indian Railways
- Rake maintenance: New Delhi (Shakur Basti DEMU Care Center)

The 22439/22440 New Delhi - Shri Mata Vaishno Devi Katra Vande Bharat Express is India's 2nd Vande Bharat Express train, connecting the states of New Delhi, Haryana, Punjab and Jammu and Kashmir.

== Overview ==
This train is operated by Indian Railways, connecting New Delhi, Ambala Cantt. Jn, Ludhiana Jn, Jalandhar Cantt. Jn, Pathankot Cantt., Jammu Tawi and Shri Mata Vaishno Devi Katra. It is currently operated with train numbers 22439/22440 on 6 days a week basis.

== Rakes ==
It is the second 1st Generation Vande Bharat Express train and was designed and manufactured by the Integral Coach Factory (ICF) at Perambur, Chennai under the Make in India initiative. On January 6, 2025 it was given the new 3rd generation Vande Bharat trainset having 20 coaches.

== Service ==
The 22439/22440 New Delhi - SMVD Katra Vande Bharat Express operates six days a week except Wednesdays, covering a distance of 655 km (407 mi) in a travel time of 8 hours 20 mins with an average speed of 79 km/h (49 mph). The Maximum Permissible Speed is 130 km/h (81 mph).

== See also ==
- Vande Bharat Express
- Tejas Express
- Gatimaan Express
- New Delhi railway station
- Shri Mata Vaishno Devi Katra railway station
