= Visakhapatnam–Secunderabad Vande Bharat Express =

Vande Bharat Express train route in India

Visakhapatnam Jn – Secunderabad Jn Vande Bharat Express

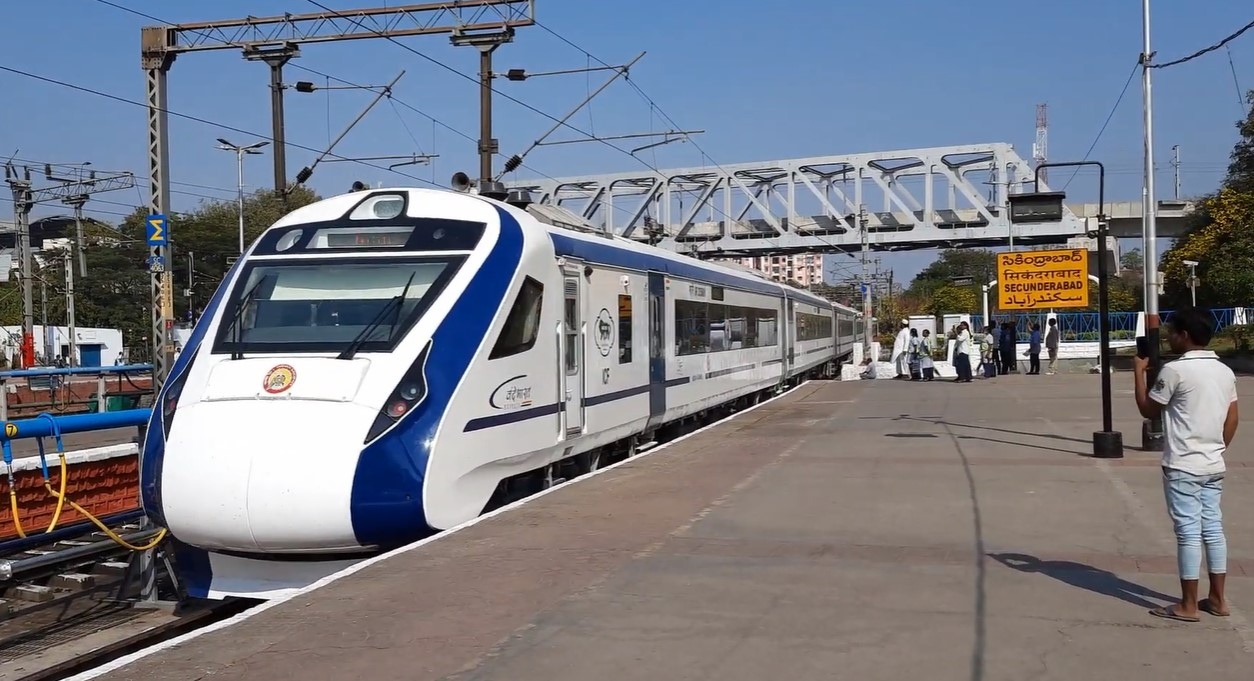

Overview
- Service type: Vande Bharat Express
- Locale: Andhra Pradesh and Telangana
- First service: 15 January 2023 (inaugural); 16 January 2023; 3 years ago (commercial)
- Current operator: South Coast Railway (SCoR)

Route
- Termini: Visakhapatnam Junction (VSKP); Secunderabad Junction (SC)
- Stops: 5
- Distance travelled: 700.04 km (435 mi) (chargeable is 699 km when it is being written)
- Average journey time: 08 hrs 30 mins
- Service frequency: Six days a week (Note: Except Tuesdays)
- Train number: 20833 / 20834
- Lines used: Howrah–Chennai main line, New Delhi–Chennai main line, Nagpur–Secunderabad line

On-board services
- Classes: AC Chair Car, AC Executive Chair Car
- Seating arrangements: Airline style; Rotatable seats
- Sleeping arrangements: No
- Auto-rack arrangements: No
- Catering facilities: On-board catering
- Observation facilities: Large windows in all coaches
- Entertainment facilities: On-board WiFi; Infotainment System
- Baggage facilities: Overhead racks
- Other facilities: Kavach

Technical
- Rolling stock: Vande Bharat 2.0 (Last service: Jan 10 2025); Vande Bharat 3.0 (First service: Jan 11 2025)
- Track gauge: 1,676 mm (5 ft 6 in)
- Electrification: 25 kV AC 50 Hz Overhead line
- Operating speed: 82 km/h (51 mph)
- Average length: 480 metres (1,570 ft) (20 coaches)
- Track owner: Indian Railways
- Rake maintenance: Visakhapatnam (VSKP)
Route map
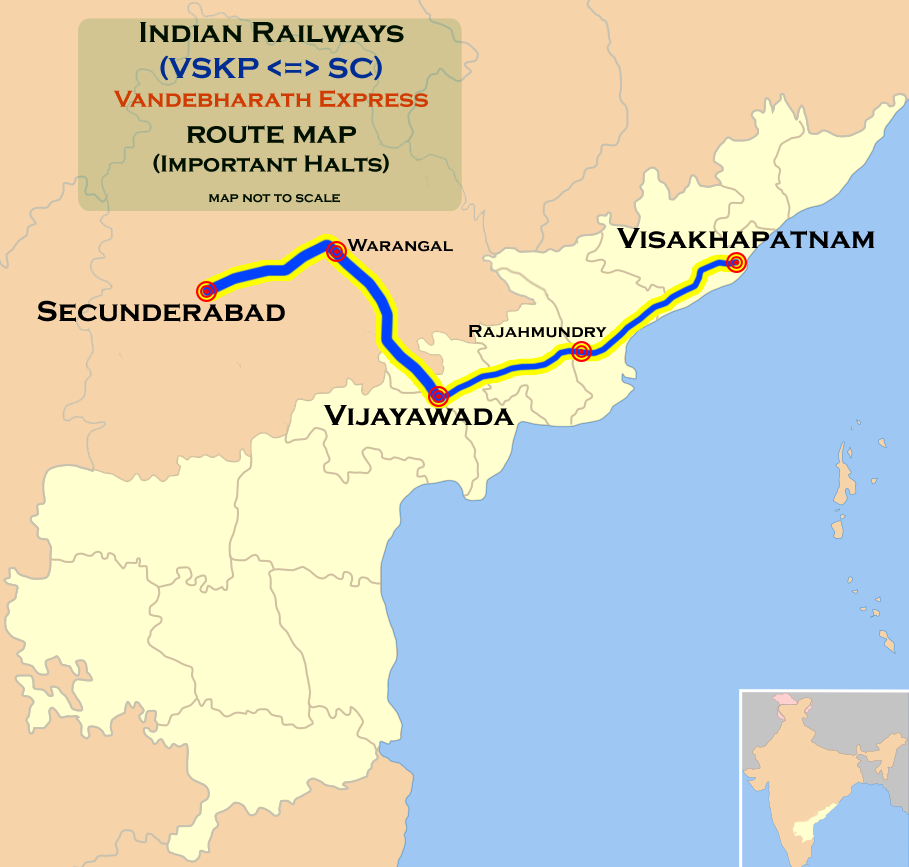

The 20833/20834 Visakhapatnam – Secunderabad Vande Bharat Express is India's 8th Vande Bharat Express train, connecting the states of Andhra Pradesh and Telangana.

== Overview ==
This train is operated by Indian Railways, connecting Visakhapatnam Jn, Samalkot Jn, Rajahmundry, Vijayawada Jn, Khammam, Warangal and Secunderabad Jn. It is currently operated with train numbers 20833/20834 on 6 days a week basis.

== Rakes ==
It was the sixth 2nd Generation Vande Bharat Express train and was designed and manufactured by the Integral Coach Factory (ICF) at Perambur, Chennai under the Make in India initiative.

As per latest updates from Waltair Division under Indian Railways, the current running rake would be converted to 20-car rake as this would benefit passengers who wish to travel to key locations like Rajahmundry, Vijayawada and to Secunderabad. This conversion commenced on January 11, 2024, and it started from Vizag City Junction.

== Service ==
The 20833/20834 Visakhapatnam Jn - Secunderabad Jn Vande Bharat Express operates six days a week except Tuesdays, covering a distance of 698 km (434 mi) in a travel time of 8 hours with an average speed of 81 km/h (50 mph). The service has 5 intermediate stops. The Maximum Permissible Speed is 130 km/h (81 mph).

== Incidents ==
On 12 January 2023, before the inaugural run of Vande Bharat Express train, a glass window was damaged by an unidentified person after stones were pelted at it in a coach railway yard in Vishakapatnam, Andhra Pradesh. This rake was arriving from ICF, Chennai for primary maintenance checks, and no casualties were reported during the incident.

== See also ==
- Tejas Express
- Gatimaan Express
