= Lucknow–Dehradun Vande Bharat Express =

Mini Vande Bharat Express train route in India

Lucknow Jn – Dehradun Terminal Vande Bharat Express

Overview
- Service type: Vande Bharat Express
- Locale: Uttar Pradesh and Uttarakhand
- First service: 12 March 2024 (Inaugural); 26 March 2024; 2 years ago (Commercial)
- Current operator: North Eastern Railways (NER)

Route
- Termini: Lucknow Junction (LJN); Dehradun (DDN)
- Stops: 5
- Distance travelled: 545 km (339 mi)
- Average journey time: 08 hrs 25 mins
- Service frequency: Six days a week, excluding Mondays
- Train number: 22545 / 22546
- Lines used: Lucknow–Moradabad line; Moradabad–Ambala line (till Laskar Junction); Laksar–Dehradun line

On-board services
- Classes: AC Chair Car, AC Executive Chair Car
- Seating arrangements: Airline style; Rotatable seats
- Sleeping arrangements: No
- Catering facilities: On board Catering
- Observation facilities: Large windows in all coaches
- Entertainment facilities: On-board WiFi; Infotainment System; Electric outlets; Reading light; Seat Pockets; Bottle Holder; Tray Table
- Baggage facilities: Overhead racks
- Other facilities: Kavach

Technical
- Rolling stock: Mini Vande Bharat 2.0
- Track gauge: Indian gauge 1,676 mm (5 ft 6 in) broad gauge
- Electrification: 25 kV 50 Hz AC Overhead line
- Operating speed: 65 km/h (40 mph) (Avg.)
- Average length: 192 metres (630 ft) (08 coaches)
- Track owner: Indian Railways
- Rake maintenance: (TBC)

The 22545/22546 Lucknow - Dehradun Vande Bharat Express is India's 44th Vande Bharat Express train, which connects the city of Lucknow in Uttar Pradesh with the winter capital city Dehradun in Uttarakhand. This express train was inaugurated by Prime Minister Narendra Modi via video conferencing from Ahmedabad on 12 March 2024.

== Overview ==
This train is operated by Indian Railways, connecting Lucknow Jn, Shahjahanpur Jn, Bareilly Jn, Moradabad Jn, Najibabad, Haridwar and Dehradun. This is operated with train numbers 22545/22546 on 6 days a week basis.

== Rakes ==
It is the forty-second 2nd Generation and twenty-eighth Mini Vande Bharat 2.0 Express train which was designed and manufactured by the Integral Coach Factory at Perambur, Chennai under the Make in India Initiative.

== Service ==
The 22545/22546 Lucknow Jn NER - Dehradun Vande Bharat Express operates six days a week except Mondays, covering a distance of 545 km (339 mi) in a travel time of 8 hours 25 mins with an average speed of 65 km/h (40 mph). The service has 4 intermediate stops. The Maximum Permissible Speed is 130 km/h (81 mph).

Lucknow Jn. - Dehradun Vande Bharat Express (22545)
Station	Station Code	Arrival	Departure	Halt (min)	Distance (km)	Day
Lucknow Jn (NER)	LJN	—N/a	05:15	—N/a	—N/a	1
Shahjahanpur Jn	SPN	07:34	07:36	2	165.0	1
Bareilly Jn	BE	08:30	08:32	2	236.0	1
Moradabad Jn	MB	09:47	09:52	5	325.0	1
Najibabad Jn	NBD	11:08	11:10	2	424.0	1
Haridwar	HW	12:05	12:10	5	493.0	1
Dehradun	DDN	13:40	—N/a	—N/a	545.0	1

Dehradun - Lucknow Jn. Vande Bharat Express (22546)
Station	Station Code	Arrival	Departure	Halt (min)	Distance (km)	Day
Dehradun	DDN	—N/a	14:25	—N/a	—N/a	1
Haridwar	HW	15:31	15:36	5	52.0	1
Najibabad Jn	NBD	16:21	16:23	2	121.0	1
Moradabad Jn	MB	17:38	17:43	5	219.0	1
Bareilly Jn	BE	18:57	18:59	2	310.0	1
Shahjahanpur Jn	SPN	20:04	20:06	2	380.0	1
Lucknow Jn (NER)	LJN	22:40	—N/a	—N/a	545.0	1

== See also ==
- Vande Bharat Express
- Tejas Express
- Gatimaan Express
- Lucknow Junction railway station
- Dehradun railway station
