= Panchari =

Panchari Hill Station in Jammu and Kashmir, India

- Hill Station
- Location in Jammu and Kashmir, India Panchari (India)
- Coordinates: 33.06°N 75.14°E
- Country: India
- Union Territory: Jammu and Kashmir
- District: Udhampur

Languages
  - Spoken: Dogri,
- Time zone: UTC+5:30 (IST)
- PIN: 182125

Panchari is a village and municipality in Udhampur district of the Jammu division of Indian union territory of Jammu and Kashmir. It is situated at an altitude of approximately 2,000 meters above sea level and is surrounded by beautiful hills and lush green forests.The town is located 40 kilometres from the district headquarters Udhampur.Its the nearest hill station to Jammu City. Its a good place for picnic with family and friends. The temperature is cool during the summers. Snowfall occurs during winters. It can be visited all round the Year.There are hotels and motels to stay overnight.

== Transport ==
=== Road ===
Panchari village is well-connected by road to other places in Jammu and Kashmir and India by the NH 44.

=== Rail ===
The nearest major railway stations to Panchari are Shri Mata Vaishno Devi Katra railway station and Udhampur railway station located at a distance of 57 kilometres and 40 kilometres respectively.

=== Air ===
The nearest airport to Panchari is Jammu Airport located at a distance of 95 kilometres and is a 3-hour drive.

== See also ==
- Jammu and Kashmir
- Udhampur district
- Udhampur
