= Sankri Devta =

Sankri Devta temple is in the village of Meer in Udhampur district, Jammu and Kashmir, India. It is located on route of Pancheri at a distance of about 33 km from Udhampur. The village is mostly of hilly terrain and only very small portion is used for agriculture.

Sankari Devta temple has idols of deities which are known to be of Shiva and Shakti. The temple is said to be about more than 500 years old.

Famous sankri mela also organised at the month of August or September in which huge crowd of peoples comes together and take blessing of baba sankri
