= Amara (Udhampur district) =

Villages in India

- Village
- Location in Jammu and Kashmir Amara (India)
- Coordinates: 33.035°N 75.276°E
- Country: India
- Union Territory: Jammu and Kashmir
- District: Udhampur
- Tehsil: Khoon

Area
  - Total: 434.2 ha (1,073 acres)
- Elevation: 1,062 m (3,484 ft)

Population (2011)
  - Total: 1,745
  - Density: 401.9/km^{2} (1,041/sq mi)

Demographics
  - Literacy: 59.71%
  - Sex ratio: 830 ♀/ 915 ♂

Languages
  - Official: Dogri, English, Hindi, Kashmiri, Urdu
  - Spoken: Dogri, Hindi, Kashmiri
- Time zone: UTC+5:30 (IST)
- PIN: 182117
- Telephone code: 01992
- Vehicle registration: JK-14
- Website: udhampur.nic.in

Amara is a village in Udhampur district, Jammu & Kashmir, India. It is 15 km (9.3 mi) from Majalta tehsil.

== Demographics ==
According to the 2011 Census of India, Amara village has a total population of 1,745 people including 915 males and 830 females with a literacy rate of 59.71%.

| Population | Total | Male | Female |
|---|---|---|---|
| Total population | 1,745 | 915 | 830 |
| Literate population | 1,042 | 598 | 444 |
| Illiterate population | 703 | 317 | 386 |
