= Ram Nagar railway station =

Railway station in India

Ram Nagar J&K Railway Station

General information
- Location: Roun Domail, Dhar Road, Ram Nagar, Udhampur district, Jammu and Kashmir; India
- Coordinates: 32.8450°N 75.1512°E
- Elevation: 596 metres (1,955 ft)
- System: Regional rail and Light rail station
- Owner: Indian Railways
- Operator: Northern Railway zone
- Platforms: 2
- Tracks: 4
- Connections: Auto stand

Construction
- Structure type: At–ground
- Parking: No
- Cycle facilities: No

Other information
- Status: Functioning
- Station code: RMJK
- Zone(s): Northern Railway zone
- Division(s): Firozpur
Location

Ram Nagar J&K Railway Station is a small railway station in Udhampur district, Jammu and Kashmir. Its code is RMJK. It serves Ramnagar town. The station consists of two platforms. The platforms are not well sheltered. It lacks many facilities including water and sanitation.

== Train Stops ==
MCTM-PTK DMU

MALWA EXPRESS

UTTAR S KRANTI
