= Talwara (disambiguation) =

Talwara can refer to:

- Talwara, a town in Punjab state, India
- Talwara (Reasi district), a town in Jammu and Kashmir, India
- Talwara Lake, in Rajasthan state, India
- Talwara Mughlan, a union council in Sialkot Tehsil of Punjab province, Pakistan

== See also ==
- Talwar (disambiguation)
  - Talwar, a type of South Asian sword
