= Pancher =

Pancher is a French surname. Notable people with the surname include:

- Bertrand Pancher (born 1958), French politician
- Jean Armand Isidore Pancher (1814–1877), French gardener and botanist

== See also ==
- Pacher
- Pancheri
