= Manwal railway station =

Railway station in India

Coordinates: 32.7691°N 75.1321°E

Manwal Railway Station is a railway station serving near Manwal town, in Udhampur district of the Jammu and Kashmir territory of India. It is under Firozpur railway division of Northern Railway Zone of Indian Railways. It is located on Jammu- Udhampur line of the Indian Railways.

It is provided with Solar Power. Railway station lighting and fans are working on solar power. The JK state electric supply is a standby source, which can be used in case of any failure of solar system.

It is located at 491 m above sea level and has one platforms. As of 2016, single Broad Gauge railway line exist and at this station, 2 trains stops. Jammu Airport, is at distance of 30 kilometers.

Station is well connected with the road transportation to nearby cities.
