= Sen =

Sen may refer to:

== Surname ==
- Sen is a surname used by Magars and Thakuri in Nepal
- Sen (surname), a Bengali surname
- Şen, a Turkish surname
- A variant of the Serer patronym Sène

== Currency subunit ==
- Etymologically related to the English word cent; a hundredth of the following currencies:
  - Brunei dollar
  - Cambodian riel
  - Malaysian ringgit
  - Indonesian rupiah
- Etymologically unrelated to the English word cent; a hundredth of the following currency:
  - Japanese yen - (the Japanese "sen" is now obsolete)

== People ==
- Sen Fujimoto (born 1923) Japanese novelist
- Sen Katayama (1859–1933), Japanese Marxist political activist and journalist
- Sen Mitsuji (born 1987) Australian actor and model
- Sen Morimoto Japanese jazz rap multi-instrumentalist.
- Sen no Dōan (1546–1607) Japanese tea ceremony master
- Sen Sōshitsu XV (1923–2025) was the 15th-generation Grand Master iemoto of Urasenke
- Sen Yamanaka (born 1958), Japanese politician
- Anna Sen (born 1990), Russian handball player
- Amartya Sen (born 1933), Indian economist and philosopher
- Aparna Sen (born 1945), Indian filmmaker and actress
- Antara Dev Sen (born 1963), British–Indian journalist
- Asit Sen (actor) (1917–1993), Indian actor
- Erroll Chunder Sen (1899–c.1941), Indian First World War aviator
- Kaushik Sen (or Koushik Sen), Indian actor
- Keshub Chandra Sen (or Keshab Chunder Sen; 1838–1884), Hindu philosopher
- Ko Chung Sen (born 1968), Malaysian politician
- Konkona Sen Sharma (born 1979), Indian actress and director
- Ivan Sen (born 1972), Australian Director of Indigenous and Croatian descent
- Lakshya Sen (born 2001), Indian badminton player
- Lin Sen (1868–1943), chairman of the government of the 1912–49 Republic of China
- Masako Sen (born 1951), Japanese former member of the Imperial Family
- Masao Sen (born 1947) Japanese Enka singer and businessman
- Mihir Sen (1930–1997), Indian swimmer
- Moon Moon Sen (born 1954), Indian actress
- Nandana Sen (born 1967), Indian actress and writer
- Raima Sen (born 1979), Indian actress
- Ramprasad Sen, saint and poet
- Reema Sen (born 1981), Indian actress
- Rimi Sen (born 1981), Indian actress and film producer
- Riya Sen (born 1981), Indian actress and model
- Sandipta Sen (born 1987), Bengali television actress
- Shobha Sen (1923–2017, Bengali theatre and film actress
- Srabani Sen or Sraboni Sen, an Indian singer
- Sohail Sen, Indian music composer
- Surya Sen (1894–1934), Indian revolutionary
- Suchitra Sen (born as Roma Dasgupta, 1931), an Indian actress
- Sushmita Sen (born 1975), an Indian actress and model
- Sen no Rikyū (1522–1591) Japanese tea master considered the most important influence on the chanoyu
- Senhime (1597–1666), the eldest daughter of the shōgun Tokugawa Hidetada
- Sun Yat-sen, Chinese leader
- Tsuda Sen (1837–1908) Japanese politician, educator and writer
- Ali Şen, Turkish actor
- Eren Şen, German-Turkish footballer
- Gülhan Şen, Turkish television presenter, producer, and speaker
- H. Nida Sen, Turkish ophthalmologist
- Şener Şen, Turkish actor
- Volkan Şen, Turkish footballer

== Places ==
- London Southend Airport, UK, IATA airport code
- Sen, Abadan, a village in Khuzestan Province, Iran
- Sen, Iran, a village in Khuzestan Province
- Sen, Zanjan, a village in Iran
- Sen Brahmana, a village in Jammu and Kashmir, India
- Sen (river), Yakutia, Russian Federation

== Other uses ==
- Sen (go), a handicapping term in the game go
- Sen (Mandaeism), the Mandaean name for the moon
- Sen., an abbreviation for the title Senator
- Sen, a character in the film Spirited Away
- Sen (unit) in Thai measurement
- SEN, Special Educational Needs
- SEN, Sports Entertainment Network
