= Rehambal =

Rehambal Rehambal
- Census town
- Location in Jammu and Kashmir, India Rehambal (India)
- Coordinates: 32.8945429°N 75.0671704°E
- Country: India
- State: Jammu and Kashmir
- District: Udhampur

Population (2001)
  - Total: 6,990

Languages
  - Official: Dogri
- Time zone: UTC+5:30 (IST)

Rehambal is a census town in Udhampur district about 9 km from Udhampur Bus Stand in the Indian union territory of Jammu and Kashmir.

== Demographics ==
As of 2001 India census, Rehambal had a population of 6990. Males constitute 52% of the population and females 48%. Rehambal has an average literacy rate of 67%, higher than the national average of 59.5%: male literacy is 70%, and female literacy is 65%. In Rehambal, 13% of the population is under 6 years of age.

== Religion ==
Hindu 86.52%, Muslim 6.38%

Its distance from main Udhampur town is 10 km on the road towards Jammu (NH44) and it acts as the entry point to the town of Udhampur. Its main attractions include Kali mata mandir which has a small zoo and Dudhar Nallah which is very famous among the youngsters for swimming during the summers. It is also home to 1st Field ordnance depot (1FOD) which is the largest employer in the area. Headquarters of Northern command of Indian army are 5 km from Rehambal.
