= Ghordi Khas =

Villages in India

- Town
- Location in Jammu and Kashmir, India Ghordi Khas (India)
- Coordinates: 32.879716°N 75.274953°E
- Country: India
- Union territory: Jammu and Kashmir
- District: Udhampur

Government
  - Type: Parliamentary
  - Body: Municipal

Area
  - Total: 1,365.8 ha (3,375 acres)
- Elevation: 336 m (1,102 ft)

Population (2011)
  - Total: 4,649
  - Density: 340.4/km^{2} (881.6/sq mi)

Languages
  - Official: Kashmiri, Urdu, Hindi, Dogri, English
- Time zone: UTC+5:30 (IST)
- PIN: 182122
- Vehicle registration: JK14

Ghordi Khas is a village located in Udhampur district, Jammu and Kashmir, India.

== Demographics ==
According to the 2011 Census of India, Ghordi Khas village has a total population of 4,649 people including 2,428 males and 2,221 females; and has a literacy rate of 54.70%.

Population	Total	Male	Female
Total Population	4,649	2,428	2,221
Literate Population	2,543	1,572	971
Illiterate Population	2,106	856	1,250
