= Udhampur–Jammu highway =

National highway and the road in Jammu and Kashmir

Udhampur Jammu National Highway
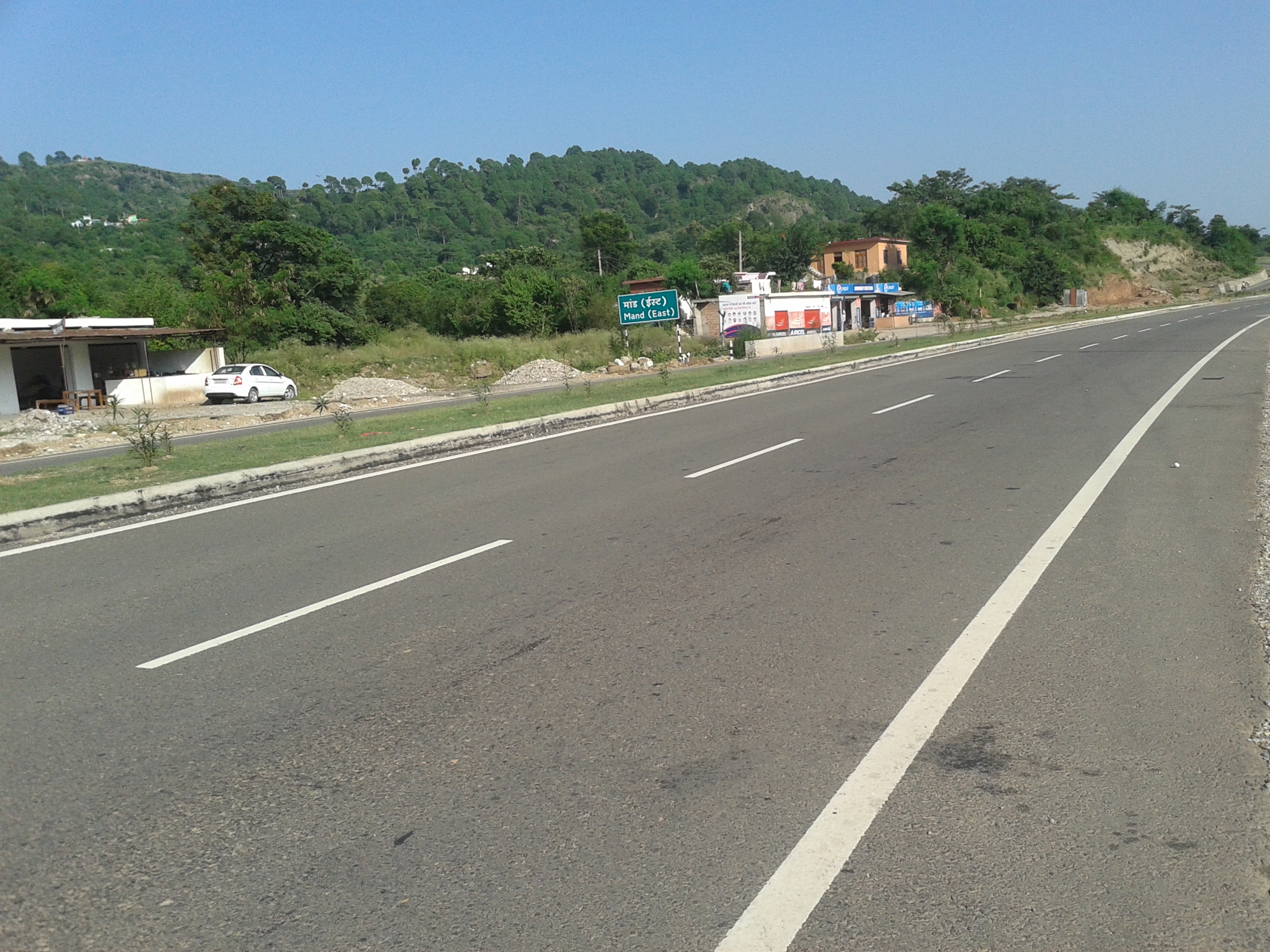

Route information
- Maintained by National Highways Authority of India
- Length: 64 km (40 mi)
- Existed: constructed–present

Major junctions
- From: Udhampur, Udhampur district
- To: Jammu, Jammu district

Location
- Country: India
- Major cities: Udhampur, Jammu

Highway system
- Roads in India; Expressways; National; State; Asian

The Udhampur Jammu highway is a four lane road in Jammu and Kashmir that connects the municipal committee of Udhampur with Jammu City. The highway is 64 kilometres (40 mi) long, passing through mountain terrain. The highway provides a road link that connects Katra with the rest of India. The highway is a small part of Jammu–Srinagar National Highway.

== History ==
In 2017 National Highway Authority of India was undertaking a major reconstruction of the road as a four lane road with better pavement, new traffic signs, footpaths, tax toll offices, traffic signals, new tunnels with fewer road curves. The state government estimated reconstruction costs at about ₹ 2400 crores. The work was completed as of 20 June 2017.

== Features ==
Traffic is controlled by traffic control room, Jammu.

The highway is connected to the bypass road which connects Udhampur with Samba directly bypassing Jammu City. The highway runs through Nandni Wild Life Sanctuary. Livestock for hundreds of thousands of army personnel are transported along this highway. Many army headquarters and army schools can be seen from the highway.

Memorial parks alongside the highway in memory of soldiers killed in action in Indo-Pak wars. The highway provides glimpses of Shri Mata Vaishno Devi University near Katra road link.

== See also ==
- Foreshore Road
- 90 Feet Road
