= Talwar (disambiguation) =

A talwar is a type of Indian sword.

Talwar may also refer to:

- Talwar (surname), an Indian surname
- Talwar Gallery, an art gallery featuring contemporary Indian art
- Talwar Zani, or Tatbir an act of self-flagellation by some Shia Muslims
- HMIS Talwar, a ship of the Royal Indian Navy and aboard which the Royal Indian Navy mutiny began in 1946
- INS Talwar, ships named Talwar of the Indian Navy
- Talwar-class frigate, an Indian Navy frigate class
- Talvar (film), a 2015 Indian film by Meghna Gulzar
- Operation Talwar, 1999 Indian naval operation during the Kargil War

== See also ==
- Talwara (disambiguation)
- Talvar (also Madan's Talvar or The Talvar), a 20th-century Indian nationalist periodical published from Berlin
