= Uttar Sampark Kranti Express =

Train in India

Uttar Sampark Kranti S. F Express
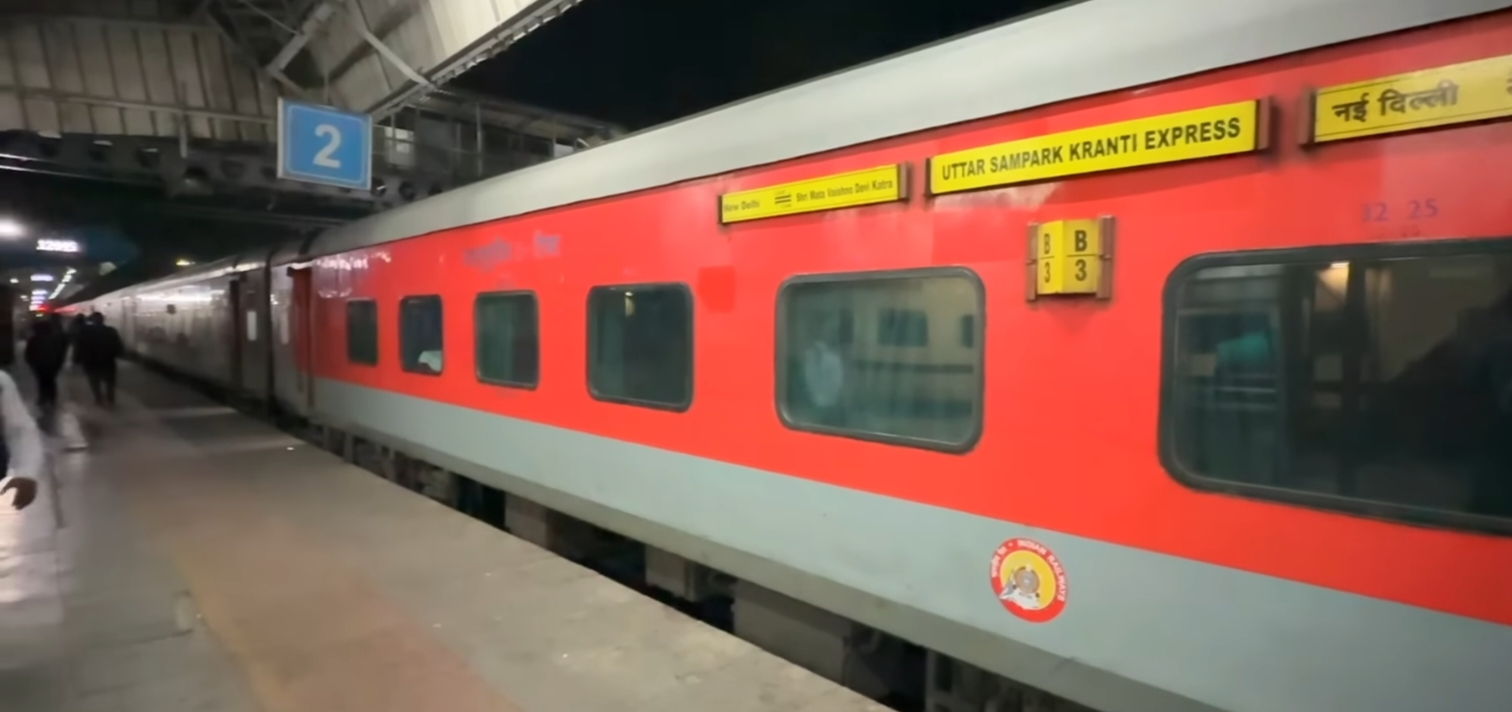
- Uttar Sampark Kranti At Ludhiana Junction

Overview
- Service type: Sampark Kranti SF Express
- Status: Daily service
- Locale: Delhi, Haryana, Punjab & Jammu and Kashmir
- First service: 2005; 21 years ago (Service to Udhampur); 1 September 2015; 10 years ago (Extended upto Shri Mata Vaishno Devi Katra)
- Current operator: Northern Railways

Route
- Termini: New Delhi (NDLS); Shri Mata Vaishno Devi Katra (SVDK)
- Stops: 9
- Distance travelled: 629 km (391 mi)
- Average journey time: 11hrs 05mins
- Service frequency: Daily
- Train number: 12445 / 12446

On-board services
- Classes: AC First Class, AC 2 Tier, AC 3 Tier, AC 3Tier Economy, Sleeper Class, General Unreserved
- Seating arrangements: Yes
- Sleeping arrangements: Yes
- Catering facilities: On-board catering, E-catering
- Observation facilities: Large windows
- Baggage facilities: Available
- Other facilities: Below the seats

Technical
- Rolling stock: LHB coach
- Track gauge: 1,676 mm (5 ft 6 in)
- Operating speed: 59 km/h (37 mph) average including halts.
Route map
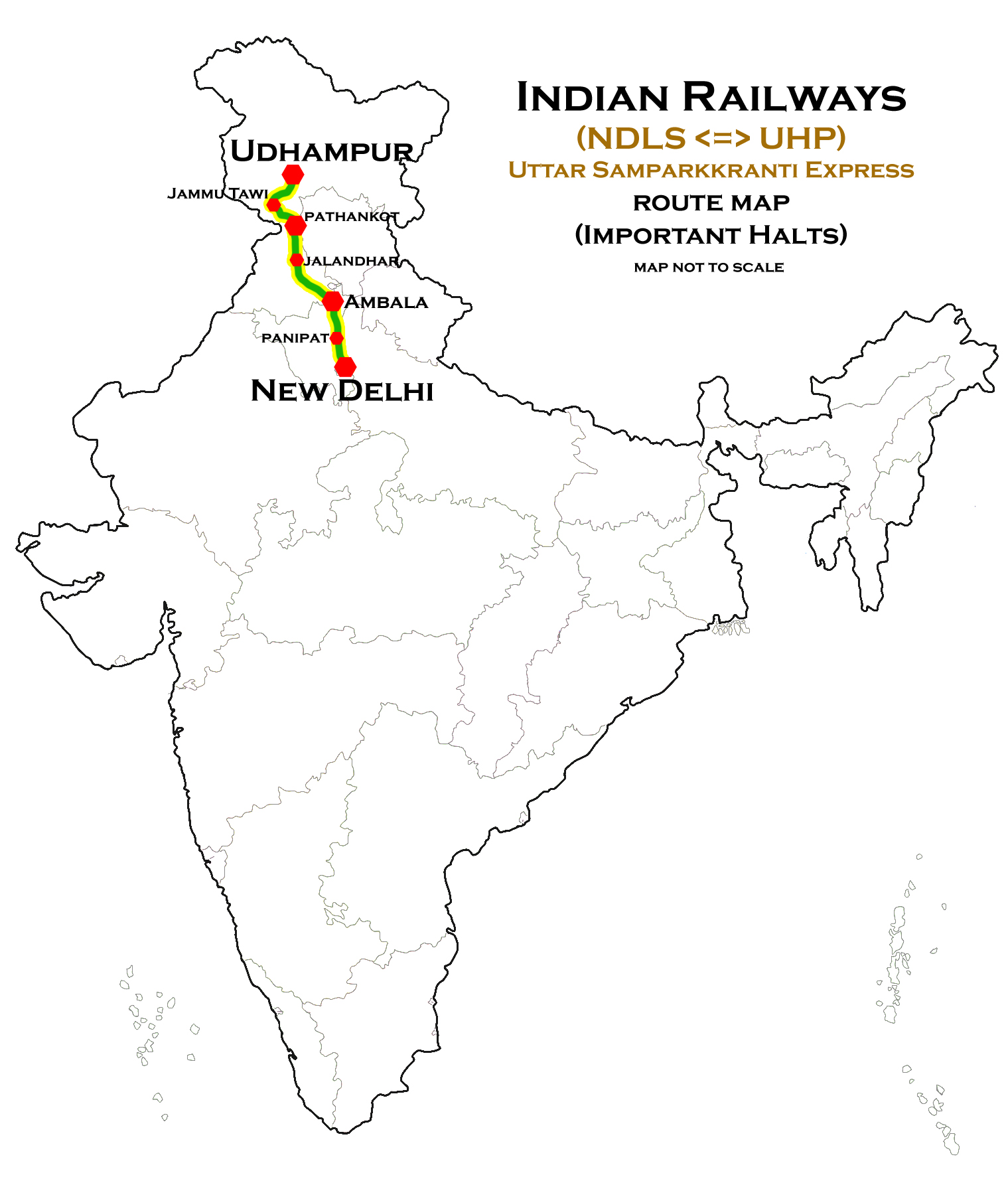

The 12445 / 12446 Uttar Sampark Kranti S. F Express is a Sampark Kranti Superfast Express train which Daily connects New Delhi Railway Station to Shri Mata Vaishno Devi Katra railway station. The train runs daily via Jammu Tawi, Jalandhar Cantonment, Ludhiana, Ambala, Panipat and Udhampur, covering a distance of 655 km at an average speed of 59 kmph. It is the best train from New Delhi to Sri Mata Vaishno Devi Katra (and vice versa).

== History ==
The train was flagged off from Udhampur by Prime Minister Shri Manmohan Singh on 14 April 2005 on Jammu Udhampur rail link as a part of Jammu–Udhampur–Baramulla rail project. The then railway minister Shri Lalu Prasad Yadav was also there. The foundation stone for this project was laid in 1983 by then Prime Minister Smt. Indira Gandhi on a rainy day in Udhampur. The train originally ran 3 days a week between new New Delhi and Udhampur. In 2006 its frequency was increased to 6 days a week and in 2009 its frequency was increased to daily. It was extended to Shri Mata Vaishno Devi Katra railway station w.e.f 01.09.2015. The train now connects Shri Mata Vaishno Devi Katra railway station to the rest of the country in the first phase of a project that will provide a rail link to the Kashmir Valley. 14033/34 Jammu Mail running between Old Delhi to Udhampur has also been extended to Shri Mata Vaishno Devi Katra railway station.

The train numbered 12445 departs New Delhi at 20:50 IST and arrives Shri Mata Vaishno Devi Katra railway station at 08:40 IST. In the return direction, the train numbered 12446 departs from Shri Mata Vaishno Devi Katra railway station at 19:10 IST and arrives New Delhi at 06:10 IST.

== Coach composition ==
LOCO-SLR-GEN-GEN-H1-A1-B5 -B4-B3-B2-B1-S12-S11-S10-S9-S8-S7-S6-S5-S4-S3-S2-S1-GEN-GEN-SLR.

== Route & halts ==
The train runs from New Delhi via Panipat Junction, Ambala Cantonment, Ludhiana, Jalandhar Cantonment, Pathankot Cantonment, Kathua, Jammu Tawi, Ramnagar JK, Udhampur to Shri Mata Vaishno Devi Katra.

== Traction ==
It is hauled by a Ghaziabad Loco Shed-based WAP-7 electric locomotive from end to end.

== Pantry/Catering ==
Catering available in the train but no pantry car services.

== Gallery ==
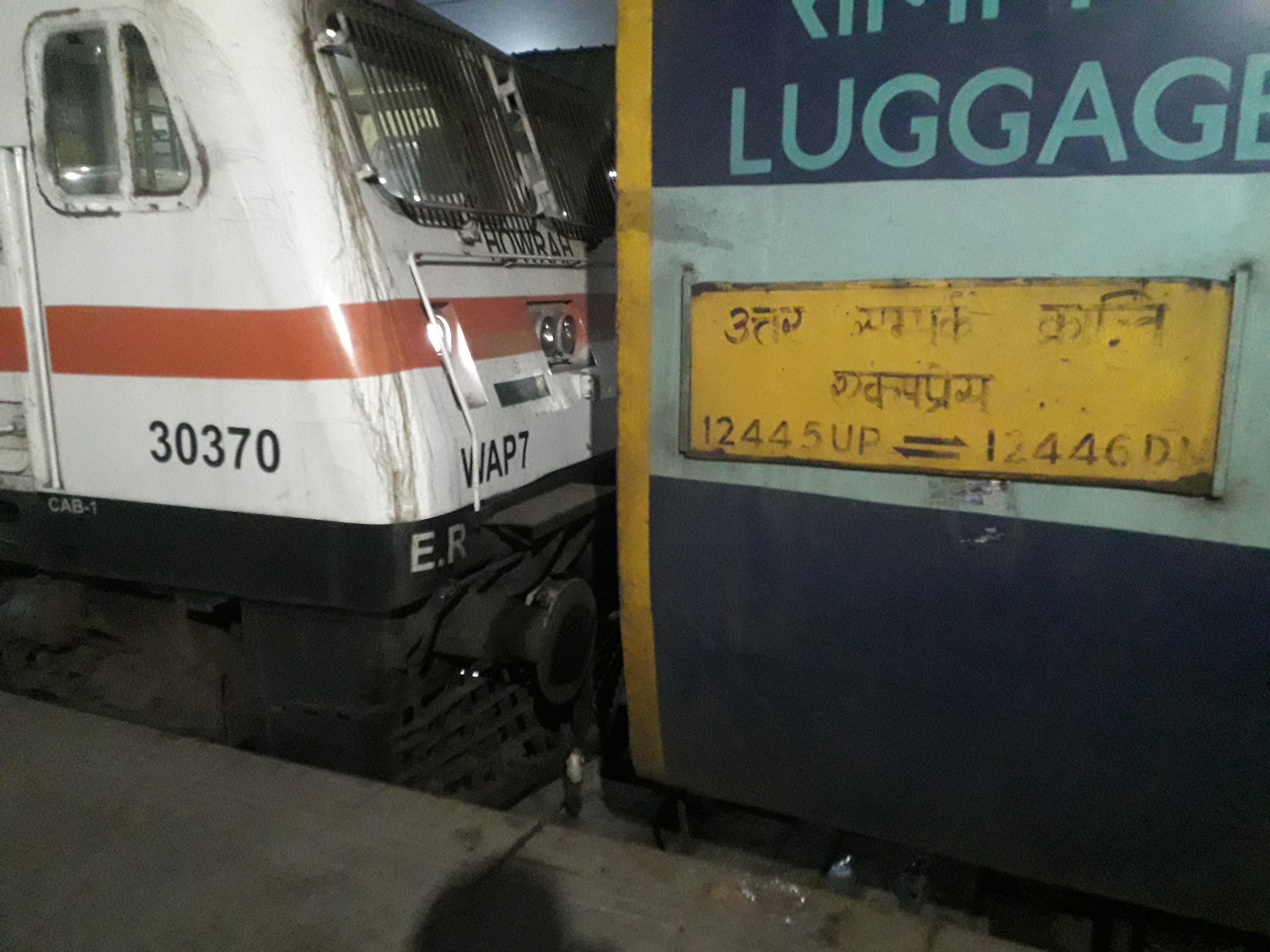
12445 Uttar Sampark Kranti Express with Howrah-based WAP-7

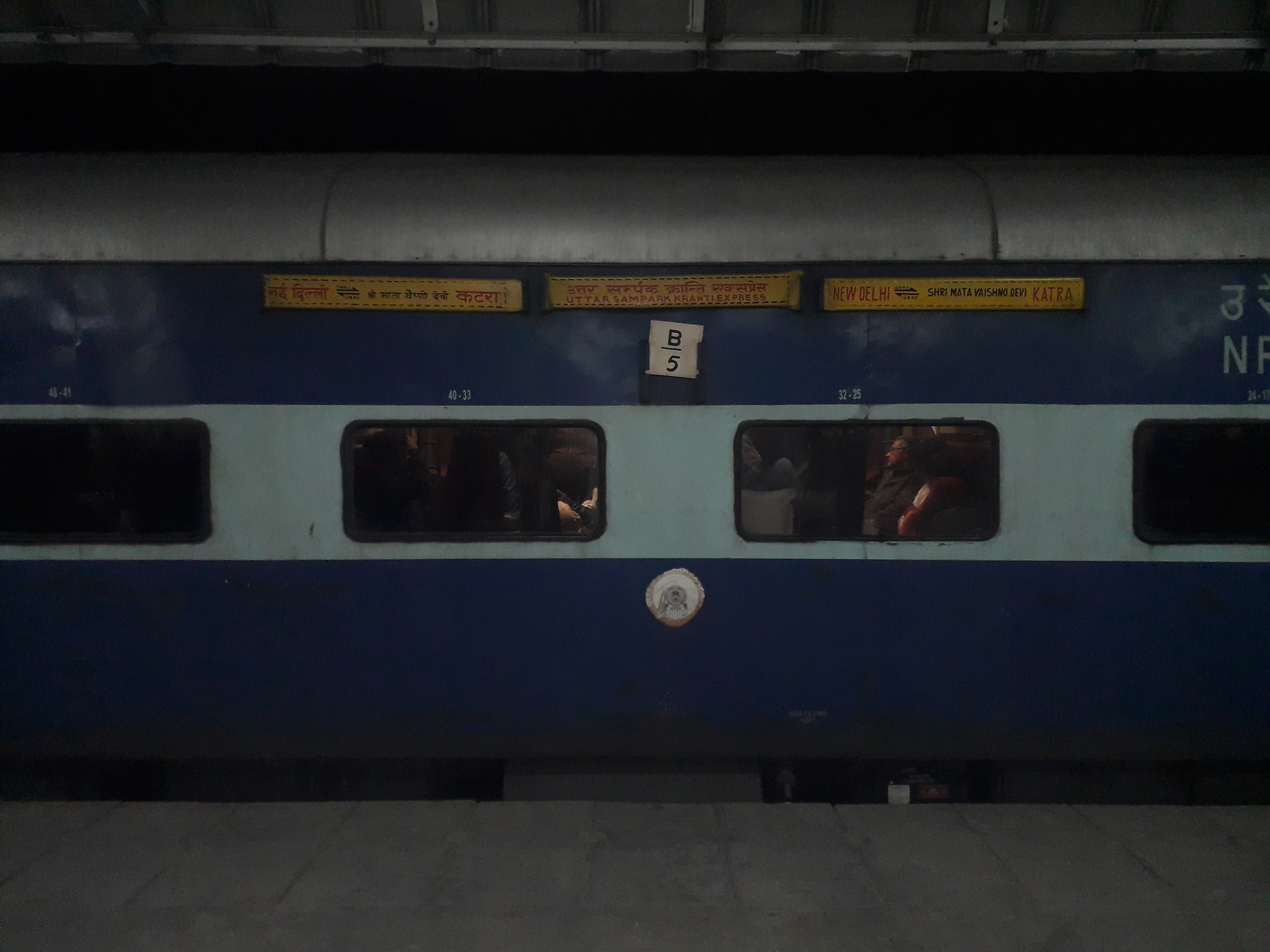
12445 Uttar Sampark Kranti Express – AC 3 tier coach

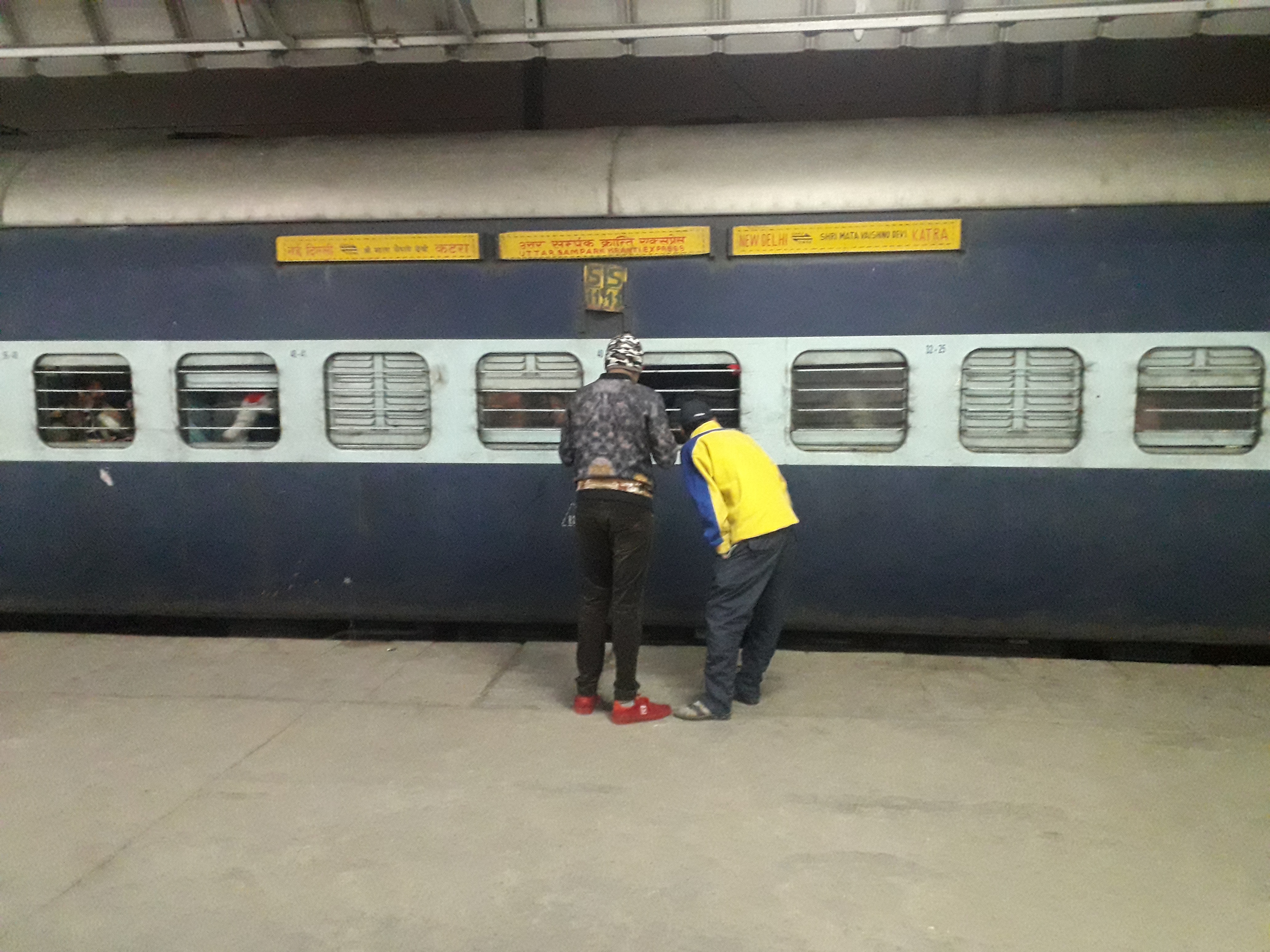
12445 Uttar Sampark Kranti Express – Sleeper class coach S11

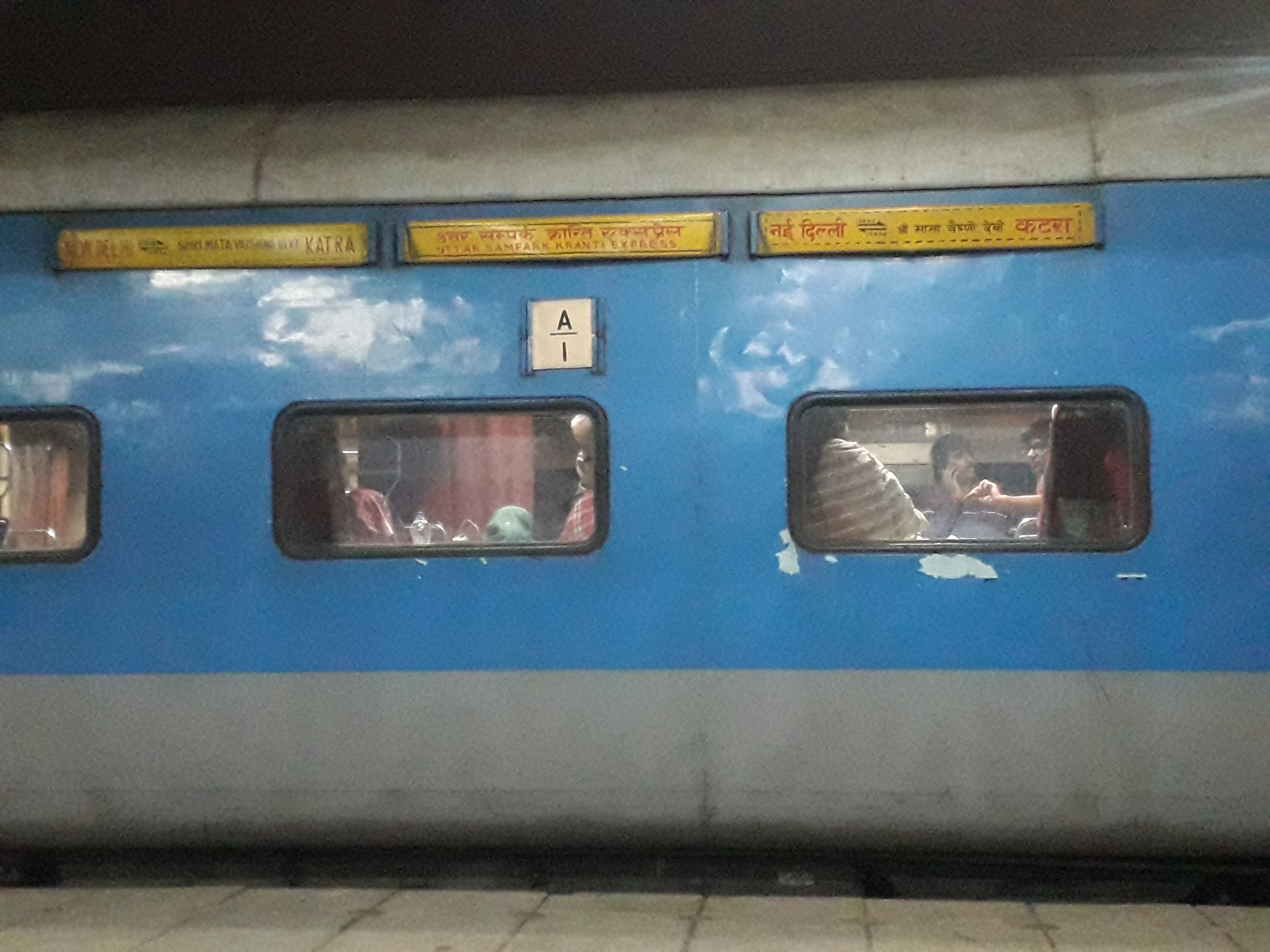
12445 Uttar Sampark Kranti Express – AC 2 tier coach

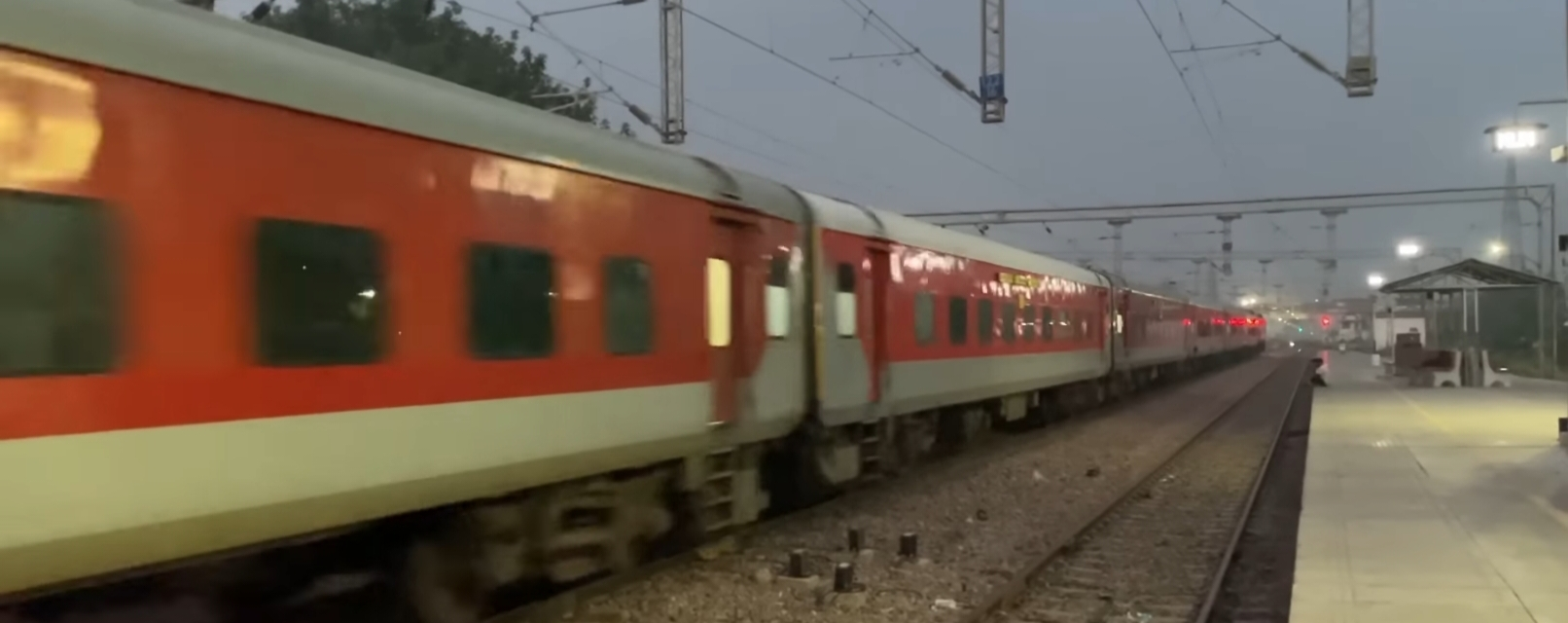
Uttar Sampark Kranti Express At Karnal Railway Station

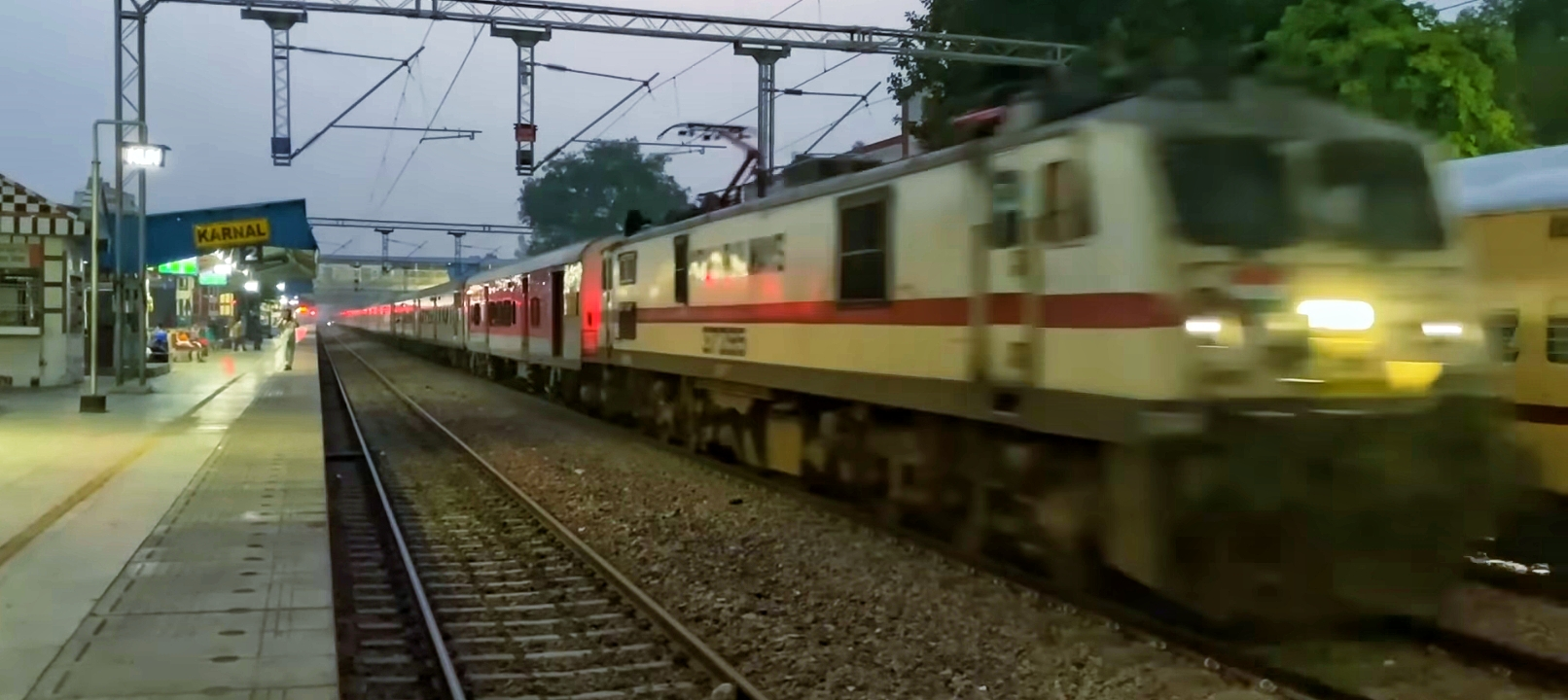
Uttar Sampark Kranti is the One of the best train Running between Delhi-Katra Route
