= Pancheri =

Pancheri is an Italian surname. Notable people with the surname include:

- Aldo Pancheri (born 1940), Italian artist
- Celestino Pancheri (c. 1881–1961), Italian sculptor
- Franco Pancheri (born 1958), Italian soccer coach and former player
- Horacio Pancheri (born 1982), Argentine actor and model

== See also ==
- Pancher, another surname
