= Majalta =

Towns in India

- Town
- Location in Jammu and Kashmir, India Majalta (India)
- Coordinates: 32.7237°N 75.1767°E
- Country: India
- Union territory: Jammu and Kashmir
- District: Udhampur

Government
  - Type: Parliamentary
  - Body: Municipal

Area
  - Total: 23,500 ha (58,000 acres)
- Elevation: 575 m (1,886 ft)

Population (2011)
  - Total: 47,663
  - Density: 203/km^{2} (525/sq mi)

Languages
  - Official: Kashmiri, Urdu, Hindi, Dogri, English
- Time zone: UTC+5:30 (IST)
- PIN: 182127
- Vehicle registration: JK14

Majalta is a Town and Tehsil which comes under Udhampur East Assembly constituency of Udhampur district, Jammu and Kashmir, India.

== Demographics ==
According to the 2011 Census of India, Majalta has a population of 47,663 people with a literacy rate of 58.91%.

Majalta Stadium is located in the town for sports facilities.

=== Villages in Majalta Tehsil ===
#	Village Name	Gram Panchayat
1	Amara	Khoon
2	Amara	Sundla
3	Bapanir Garh	N/A
4	Beraltha	Baryalta
5	Bhati Badighar	Bhatti Bari Garh
6	Blas Pur	Bilaspur
7	Babey	Babey
8	Buttal	Battal
9	Chiani	Cheani
10	Chogan	Thial
11	Deot	Bilaspur
12	Dumma	Dhamma
13	Ghar Pamasta	Dhamma
14	Ghar Sawanabanj	Garh Samana Banj
15	Hardulivian	N/A
16	Haripur	Jagwal
17	Jagwal	Jagwal
18	Jakhanu	Palnoo
19	Jasnal	Jansal
20	Kail	S K Bar
21	Kakrai	Battal
22	Kathel Dongu	Peoni
23	Mottu	Chore Panjian
24	Majalta	Majalta
25	Nagrota Lala	Dhamma
26	Nagrotta Tajoor	Cheani
27	Naki	Khoon
28	Neeli	Bharnara
29	Palnun	Palnoo
30	Pelather	Jansal
31	Pernarra	Bharnara
32	Punna	Peoni
33	Puthwar	Pathwar
34	Satrehri	Satrari
35	Sehal	S K Bar
36	Seral Chowa	Battal
37	Shahpur	Bharnara
38	Sunal	Thial
39	Sundla	Sundla
40	Tajoor	Cheani
41	Thalora	Thalora
42	Thial	Thial
