= Manwal =

- Town
- Location in Jammu & Kashmir, India Manwal (India)
- Coordinates: Jammu and Kashmir 32°46′11″N 75°07′48″E
- Country: India
- State: Jammu & Kashmir
- Division: Jammu
- District: Udhampur
- Elevation: 490 m (1,610 ft)

Manwal is a town in Udhampur district of the Jammu division of Jammu and Kashmir, India. It lies 28 km (17 mi) away from the district headquarters of Udhampur.

Manwal is a small town surrounded by the Shivalik Mountains. The Manwal railway station is located approximately 4 km (2.5 mi) from the main town area. Manwal is famous for an ancient Devi Bhagavati Temple which lies in the town. The Devi Bhagavati Temple was originally dedicated to Vishnu and dates back to the 10th or 11th century CE.

== Bhagavati Temple ==
Bhagavati temple has been taken over by the Archaeological Survey of India for preservation and protection along with four other ancient temples.

It consists of a Garbhgriha (sanctum) and an Antarala with square Mandapa. The walls of the Mandapa have eight niches. As per legend, the garbhgrihas once carried an image of Shakti, the divine power of creation. The outer chamber is open but the entrance doors have been richly carved with deities of different natures. The horizontal beam of the door has been carved with the images of navgraha, and is intermittently decorated with floral and geometrically designed motifs.

The temple is a wide path around the main building wherein several sculptures of gods are kept. The most prominent among them are the images of Surya and Mahavira. There is a strange sculpture of a carved serpentine coil kept in a niche of the main wall of the parikrama. Other images include various incarnations of Shakti and Shiva. The temples are stone structures, which the great Kashmir ruler Lalitaditya built at the foot of Harmukh mountain in Kashmir in the 8th century AD.

The remains of the ancient temples contain examples of the art and architectural styles of their period. Some of the stones, monolithic beams, and pillars used in their construction exceed 12 feet (3.7 m) in length, while the surviving sculptures and carvings reflect the artistic practices of the period.

Historian Ashok Jerath, in his book tilted 'Dogra legends of Art and Culture' has written, "A few hundred meters from the main road, deep in the village of Dera, we found a colossus structure of a massive building with towering pillars, wide sanctums and open mandapas. This holy building is erected on a massive platform which can be reached with a flight of twelve steps on the west side. We suddenly found ourselves in a wide chamber with eight fluted columns having ornamental bases. These columns might have been used for the support of horizontal and oblique slabs which we found in one of the surviving roofs of Kala Dera temples."

These slabs support the stone sheets forming the roof of the chamber or so-called antechamber. There are four garbhagrihas. The upper door beams of the entrance possess the carvings of Gods and Goddesses which have deteriorated to some extent. However, carvings of navgrahas on the horizontal upper beam of the door of the garbhagrihas, situated at the north side of the temple, are less deteriorated. Almost all the frames of garbhagrihas contain the carvings of the river deities and their maids.

In the center of each upper beam, there is a carving of Lord Ganesha. They are planned in the style of Sapt Rathis. The niches with lotus flower decoration and the horizontal beam supported by two vertical columns contain different deities. Some of the niches are devoid of any deity. The outer walls of the temple are decorated with the chiseling of geometrical figures, triangles, quadrangles and so on, which is the unique character of this temple.

Since this is a Shikhara style of temple and in structure closely related to Krimchi temples the time period of its construction is believed to be around the 10th century. Historians and art critics could not trace the genesis of the feudal lords responsible for its construction. Manwal area of this district has a few monuments whose existence dates back to about 10th century AD.

== Kala Dera Temples ==
Kala Dera temple refers to a black temple which is dedicated to Lord Shiva and faces east. The literal translation for Kala Dera is "Black Stones". It comprises a Garbhagriha (Sanctum), an Antarala (Vestibule), an Ardhamandapa (Entrance Porch) and a Mandapa (Hall). The temple is built on a high platform and heralded by a Mandapa. The entrance is through a flight of stairs in the east direction. The superstructure is somewhat missing and the temple has two columns of the sanctum, the entrance to the Mandappa and the bases of four jambs. Between the sanctum and the Mandappa lies a porch which also contains similar pillar bases. The noteworthy architectural members lying at the site are fluted, shafts, carved ceiling with inverted lotus flowers beside sculptures which have been preserved.

A second temple is Saptaratha on plan externally and is also built on an elevated platform. There is a Makara-Mukha (makara-faced) pranala through which the water flows into a small rectangular storage tank and is carved out of a single block. The roof of Mandappa is supported on four fluted columns surmounted by capitals. Besides the principal entrance facing the central aisles, it has two smaller entrances at the rear end. The figures on the jambs of the door and porch are now damaged. A well can be spotted in close vicinity.

== Dera Temple, Thalora ==
This temple is also constructed on a raised rectangular platform which is approached by a flight of stairs on the west side. It has two principal square sanctums divided from each other by a luxuriant cell. Each of the sanctums is preceded by a porch having two fluted pillars surmounted by a very baroque vase and floral capitals. The decoration over the architrave above the columns of the porch of the sanctum on the northern side of the mandappa contains ornamented Navagraha panel. The ASI has played an important part in bringing the structure back to its original state. This temple is assigned the same date as the previous ones.

== Devi Bhagavati Temple ==
Devi Bhagavati temple consists of a Garbhagriha (Sanctum), an Antarala (Vestibule), an Ardhamandapa (Entrance Porch) and a Mandapa (Hall). The entrance of the antrala has a joist which is carved with figures of Ganesha at the center while its jambs bear the characters of Ganga and Yamuna. Externally, the temple is well ornamented. It has foliated projecting triangles alternating with rectangular fortes surmounted by stepped pediments. Garbhagriha is wreathed with plain mouldings, niches on central projection for Parsva Devtas (subsidiary Gods). The temple structure dates back to circa 10th century AD.

Favorite tourist spots like Mansar, Suruisar, Patnitop, Mata Vaishno Devi, Katra etc. are 10 km,18 km,75 km and 50 km respectively. Manwal falls under Ramnagar constituency. Manwal railway station lies on Jammu-Udhampur line of Northern Railway Zone of the Indian Railways.
