= Sen Brahmana =

- Village
- Location in Jammu and Kashmir, India Sen Brahmana (India)
- Coordinates: 32.94°N 74.98°E
- Country: India
- Union Territory: Jammu and Kashmir
- District: Udhampur
- Elevation: 1,062 m (3,484 ft)

Population (2001)
  - Total: 2,159

Languages
  - Official: Urdu, Dogri, Kashmiri language
- Time zone: UTC+5:30 (IST)
- PIN: 182141
- Telephone code: 01992
- Vehicle registration: JK 14

Sen Brahmana is a village located in Udhampur Tehsil of Udhampur district near Chenab river(Tawi) in Jammu and Kashmir, India. It is situated 22 km away from the town of Udhampur, which is also district & sub-district headquarter of Sen Brahmana village. The village is named after Sen Brahmin Clan. According to Census 2011 information, the location code or village code of Sen Brahmana village is 004891. Sen Brahmana is a medium size village with total 249 families residing. The Sen Brahmana village has population of 1391 of which 699 are males while 692 are females as per Population Census 2011.

In Sen Brahmana village population of children with age 0-6 is 195 which makes up 14.02% of total population of village. Average Sex Ratio of Sen Brahmana village is 990 which is higher than Jammu and Kashmir state average of 889. Child Sex Ratio for the Sen Brahmana as per census is 1074, higher than Jammu and Kashmir average of 862.

Sen Brahmana village has higher literacy rate compared to Jammu and Kashmir. In 2011, literacy rate of Sen Brahmana village was 77.93% compared to 67.16% of Jammu and Kashmir. In Sen Brahmana Male literacy stands at 85.95% while female literacy rate was 69.71%.

As per constitution of India and Panchyati Raaj Act, Sen Brahmana village is administrated by Sarpanch (Head of Village) who is elected representative of village.
