= Pacher =

Pacher is an Austrian surname. It may refer to:

- David Pacher (1816–1902), Austrian priest and botanist
- Franz Pacher (1919–2018), Austrian engineer
- Quentin Pacher (born 1992), French cyclist
- Michael Pacher (1435–1498), Austrian painter and sculptor

== See also ==
- Hasani Pacher, village in Iran
