= Aldo Pancheri =

Italian painter and printmaker (born 1940)

Aldo Pancheri (born 20 May 1940) is an Italian painter and printmaker. He was born in Trento. He is known for his engraving and for experimental work with timbric matrices.

== Life ==
Pancheri was born in Trento, Italy on May 20, 1940. At age thirteen, he had an exhibition in Trento, at the "Sala degli Specchi," introduced by Alfonso Gatto. After graduating from Trento's Art High School, he enrolled at the Accademia di Belle Arti di Bologna in Virglio Guidi's school, receiving his diploma in 1962. During this time, Pancheri participated in the San Fedele art awards in Milan. Pancheri won the Diomira prize and came in second for the San Fedele prize twice.

At the art gallery L'Argentario in Trento, Pancheir shared a studio with painter Aldo Schmid for 18 months. Pancheri bought a star-shaped printing press that allowed him to start his engraving activity. He created series of lithographic printings that would be exhibited a few years later at the Plazzo Sormani in Milan. Pancheri had his first exhibition in a public space, at the Museo Civico di Palazzo Sturm in Bassano del Grappa.

In the 1970s, Pancheri moved to Milan permanently. In 1983, he had an exhibition at the gallery "Il traghetto" in Venice, and Giani de Marco became 'his' gallery director.

Since the 1980s, Pancheri has cooperated with the printer Giorgio Upiglio in experimental techniques using self-invented plastic components. Since 1983, he has taken part in "Avventure visive," (an art group started together with Giorgio Azzaroni, Giancarlo Marchese e Franco Ricci) and, more consistently, at "Morfo-cromo-machia".

As one of Italy's InSEA members and under the purview of the cultural activities promoted by UNESCO, Pancheri took a sabbatical in Coventry in July 1970, at the Künstlerhaus of Salzburg in November 1986, and in Glurns, Italy in 1987 as a part of the cultural activities promoted by Arge-Alp.

Pancheri is currently developing a new expressive form: the art of timbre. He uses timbric matrices that are available for other artists.
