= Talwara (Reasi district) =

- Census town
- Location in Jammu and Kashmir, India Talwara (India)
- Coordinates: 33.086781°N 74.780807°E
- Country: India
- State: Jammu and Kashmir
- District: Reasi

Population (2001)
  - Total: 5,105

Languages
  - Official: Dogri
- Time zone: UTC+5:30 (IST)

Talwara is a census town in Reasi district in the Indian union territory of Jammu and Kashmir.

== Demographics ==
As of 2001 India census, Talwara had a population of 5105. Males constitute 63% of the population and females 37%. Talwara has an average literacy rate of 68%, higher than the national average of 59.5%: male literacy is 78%, and female literacy is 52%. In Talwara, 11% of the population is under 6 years of age.
