= Udhampur =

- City
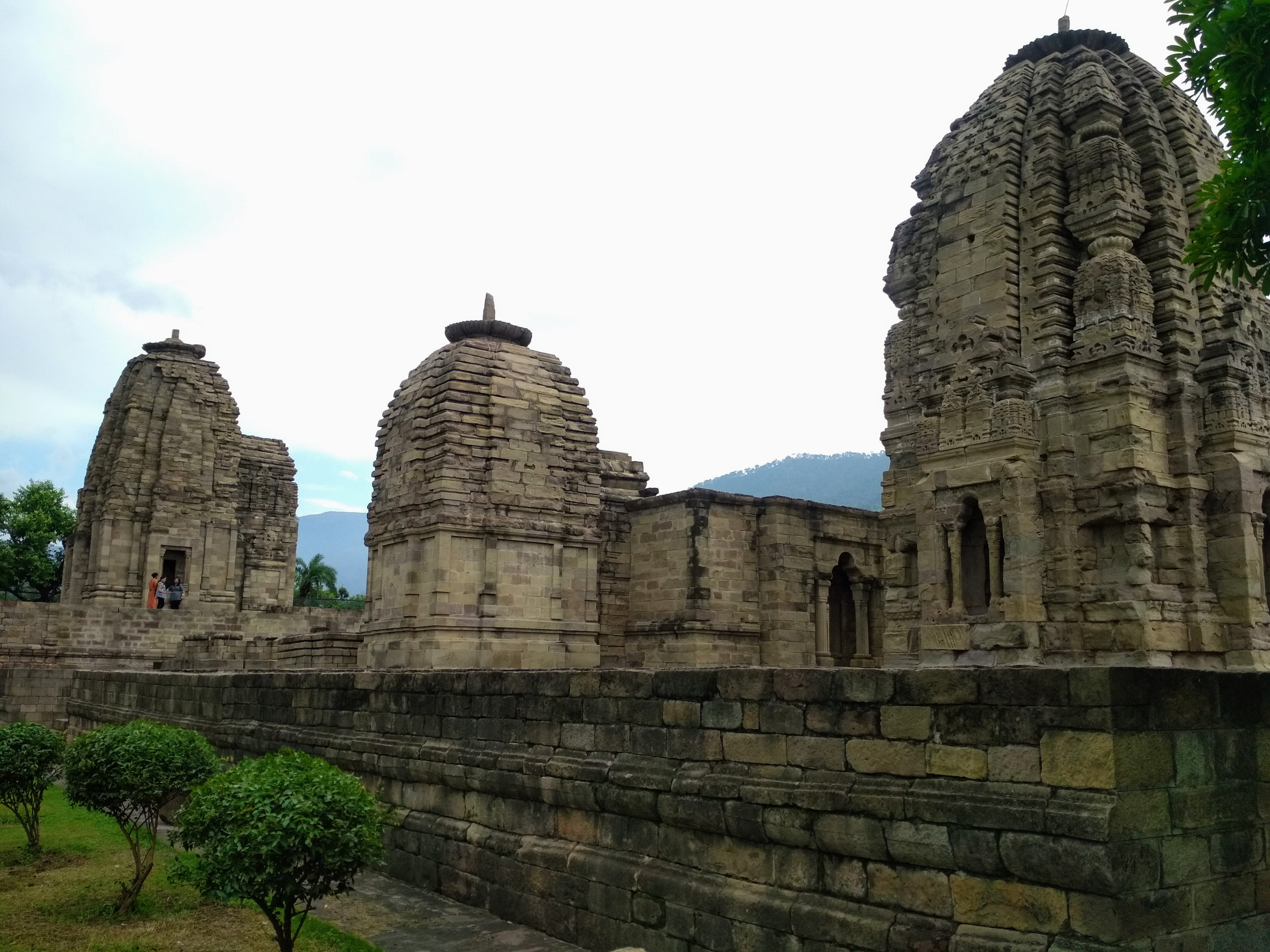
- Krimchi Temples
- Interactive map of Udhampur
- Location within Jammu and Kashmir Location within India
- Coordinates: 32.915977°N 75.141937°E
- Country: India
- Union Territory: Jammu and Kashmir
- District: Udhampur
- Founder: Raja Udham Singh
- Named for: Raja Udham Singh

Government
  - Body: Udhampur Municipal Committee

Area
  - Total: 30.42 km^{2} (11.75 sq mi)
- Elevation: 755 m (2,477 ft)

Population (2011)
  - Total: 91,366
  - Density: 3,003/km^{2} (7,779/sq mi)
- Demonym(s): Udhampuri, Udhampuria, Udhampuriya

Languages
  - Official: Dogri, Hindi, Urdu, Kashmiri, English
- Time zone: UTC+5:30 (IST)
- PIN: 182101 (Udhampur)
- Telephone code: 91-1992
- Vehicle registration: JK-14
- Website: udhampur.nic.in

Udhampur (Hindi pronunciation: [ˌʊd̪ʱəmpur]) is a city and a municipal council in Udhampur district in the Indian union territory of Jammu and Kashmir.It is the headquarters of Udhampur District. Named after Raja Udham Singh, it serves as the district capital and the Northern Command headquarters of the Indian Army. A Forward Base Support Unit (FBSU) of the Indian Air Force is also stationed here. Udhampur is used by the Armed Forces as a transit point between Jammu and Srinagar when travelling by road on National Highway 1A, which has since been renamed as National Highway 44.

Tourist attractions include Patnitop, Panchari Landhar, Ladha Dhar, Dudu Basantgarh, Ramnagar, Yug Dhar, Shivgarh, Sudhmahadev, Mantali International Yoga Center, Benesangh, and Chenani Nashri Tunnel.

== Geography ==
The city of Udhampur is located in the Shivalik range of Himalayas while the district itself extends into the Lesser Himalayan range and the terrain is mostly mountainous. The upper reaches of the district experience snowfall in the winter season like Panchari Landhar, ladha dhar, Patnitop, Sudhmahadev, Latti, Dudu, and Basantgarh. The city itself is in a relatively flatter part of the district at an elevation of 756 metres (2480 feet) and it experiences snowfall in upper altitude of the district.

== Administration ==
The town of Udhampur is governed by Udhampur Municipal Committee with 22 municipal wards. Udhampur district includes 4 Sub Divisions, 8 Tehsils, 17 blocks, 204 Panchayats, 357 villages and 21 Niabats.

== Climate ==
The city's climate is subtropical. Summer temperatures may exceed 40 degrees while temperatures below freezing have been recorded in winter. The annual rainfall is 130 cm, mainly in monsoons and winters. Central Udhampur rarely experiences snowfall, though its outer regions do occasionally. Due to changing climate patterns, heavier snowfall has been experienced in recent years. In 2011, there was about 15 cm snow. Heavy hailstorms with piles of hail can be experienced in February and March.

== Agriculture ==
Agriculture is the mainstay of more than 80% people in Jammu & Kashmir. Major food crops are wheat, paddy and maize. Barley, jowar and bajra are cultivated in some parts of the state. The agro-climatic condition of this state supports horticulture.

Climate data for Udhampur
Month	Jan	Feb	Mar	Apr	May	Jun	Jul	Aug	Sep	Oct	Nov	Dec	Year
Record high °C (°F)	24.1 (75.4)	26.7 (80.1)	31.1 (88.0)	36.2 (97.2)	38.5 (101.3)	41.9 (107.4)	42.1 (107.8)	38.8 (101.8)	34.1 (93.4)	31.1 (88.0)	28.2 (82.8)	26.1 (79.0)	42.1 (107.8)
Mean daily maximum °C (°F)	12.8 (55.0)	15.9 (60.6)	20.6 (69.1)	28.9 (84.0)	31.3 (88.3)	34.6 (94.3)	34.1 (93.4)	33.7 (92.7)	32.6 (90.7)	29.7 (85.5)	21.8 (71.2)	15.1 (59.2)	25.9 (78.7)
Mean daily minimum °C (°F)	1.2 (34.2)	4.7 (40.5)	7.6 (45.7)	11.0 (51.8)	16.4 (61.5)	20.8 (69.4)	21.5 (70.7)	21.0 (69.8)	20.0 (68.0)	11.4 (52.5)	6.4 (43.5)	3.5 (38.3)	12.1 (53.8)
Record low °C (°F)	−7.4 (18.7)	−7.0 (19.4)	−1.8 (28.8)	2.7 (36.9)	7.1 (44.8)	9.4 (48.9)	11.2 (52.2)	12.4 (54.3)	9.8 (49.6)	2.1 (35.8)	−4.7 (23.5)	−7.1 (19.2)	−7.4 (18.7)
Average rainfall mm (inches)	50.0 (1.97)	46.4 (1.83)	53.2 (2.09)	26.3 (1.04)	16.0 (0.63)	51.8 (2.04)	283.4 (11.16)	244.5 (9.63)	123.9 (4.88)	38.1 (1.50)	11.9 (0.47)	42.2 (1.66)	987.7 (38.9)
Source 1: BBC Weather
Source 2:

== Demographics ==
Religion in Udhampur City (2011)
1. Hinduism (89.5%)
2. Islam (6.43%)
3. Sikhism (2.52%)
4. Christianity (1.34%)
5. Buddhism (0.07%)
6. Jainism (0.03%)
7. Others (0.00%)
8. Not stated (0.06%)

According to the 2011 Indian census, Udhampur urban area has a population of 91,366, of which 35,507 live in the Udhampur Municipal Council area, 48,508 live in Udhampur's out-growths, and 5,743 live in Rehambal. Males constitute 60.2% of the population and females 39.8%. The large male percentage is due to the army constituting a large part of the city's population. Udhampur has an average literacy rate of 91.5%. The most followed religion in the city is Hinduism.

Historical population
Year	Pop.	±% p.a.
1911	2,360	—
1921	2,390	+0.13%
1931	3,633	+4.28%
1941	4,666	+2.53%
1951	7,464	+4.81%
1961	10,263	+3.24%
1971	16,392	+4.79%
1981	28,652	+5.74%
2001	86,299	+5.67%
2011	91,366	+0.57%

== Education ==
=== Colleges ===
- Government Medical College, Udhampur
- Government Degree College, Udhampur

- Government College for Women, Udhampur

== Transport ==
=== Road ===
Udhampur is located on National Highway NH-44, which is the only national highway that connects Srinagar to the rest of India. Bus services (both private and state owned) are the most common mode of public transportation to and from Udhampur. Frequent connections to the Kashmir Valley and Jammu are available. Taxi services are also available for going to Jammu and Srinagar and other nearby towns, and minibuses operate within the city.

=== Rail ===
Udhampur is connected to Jammu which is the winter capital of UT Jammu and Kashmir in India. The Uttar Sampark Kranti Express train from New Delhi was the first train to run on this link in 2005. More than a dozen long-distance trains either originate from Udhampur railway station or connect Udhampur to the rest of India. Commuter unreserved passenger trains link Jammu and Udhampur.

The project to connect Udhampur to the Kashmir valley by railway track is progressing. The railway line has been laid to Katra. Now Katra to Banihal track remains to be laid to complete the Jammu–Baramulla line.

The Northern Railway Construction Organization (Jammu–Baramulla line) is working on connecting Udhampur and Srinagar.

=== Air ===
Udhampur Air Force Station of the Indian Air Force (IAF) is located in Udhampur but it is not open for civilians. Jammu Airport is the nearest civilian airport.

== Gallery ==
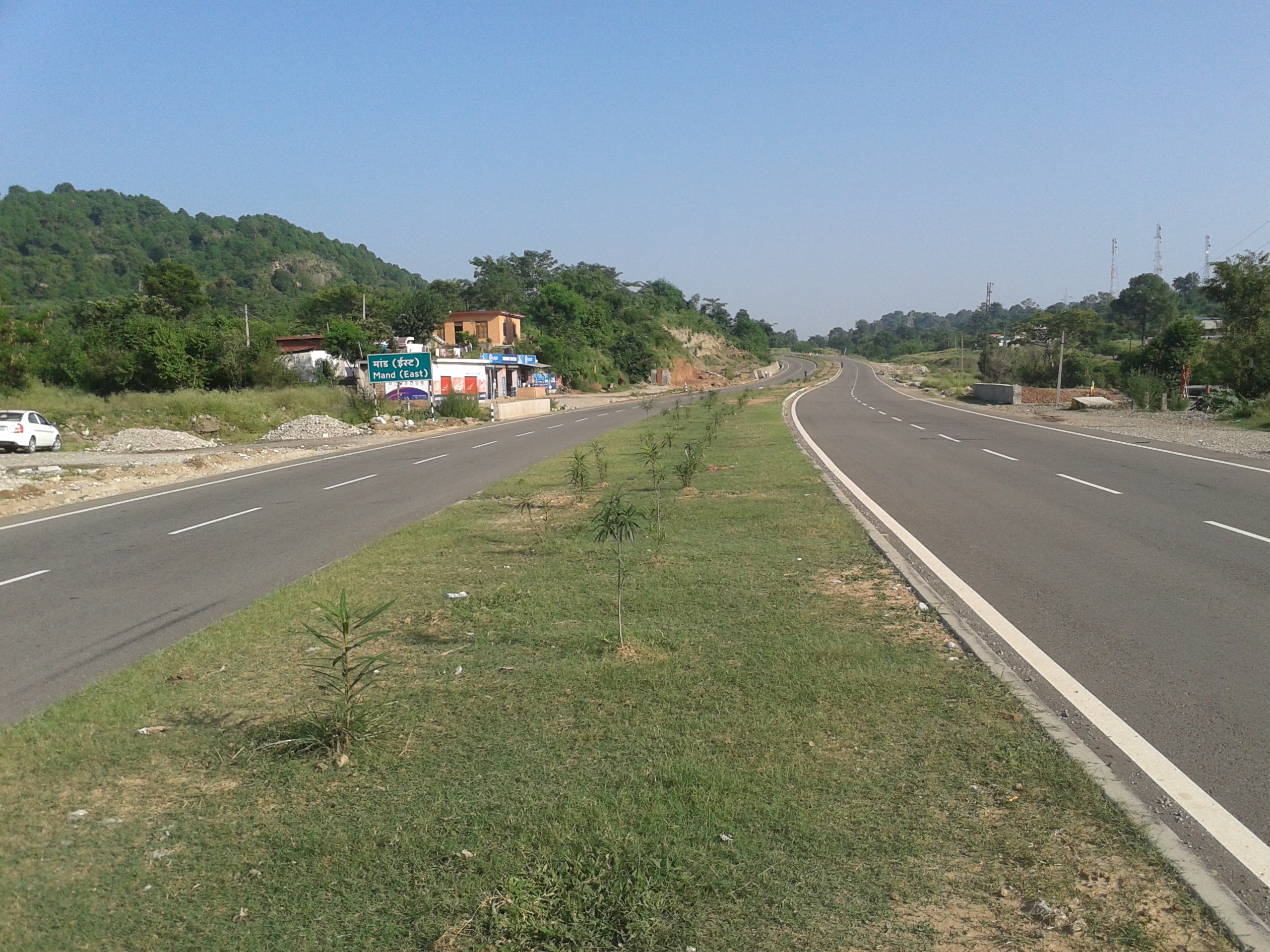
Udhampur-Jammu highway

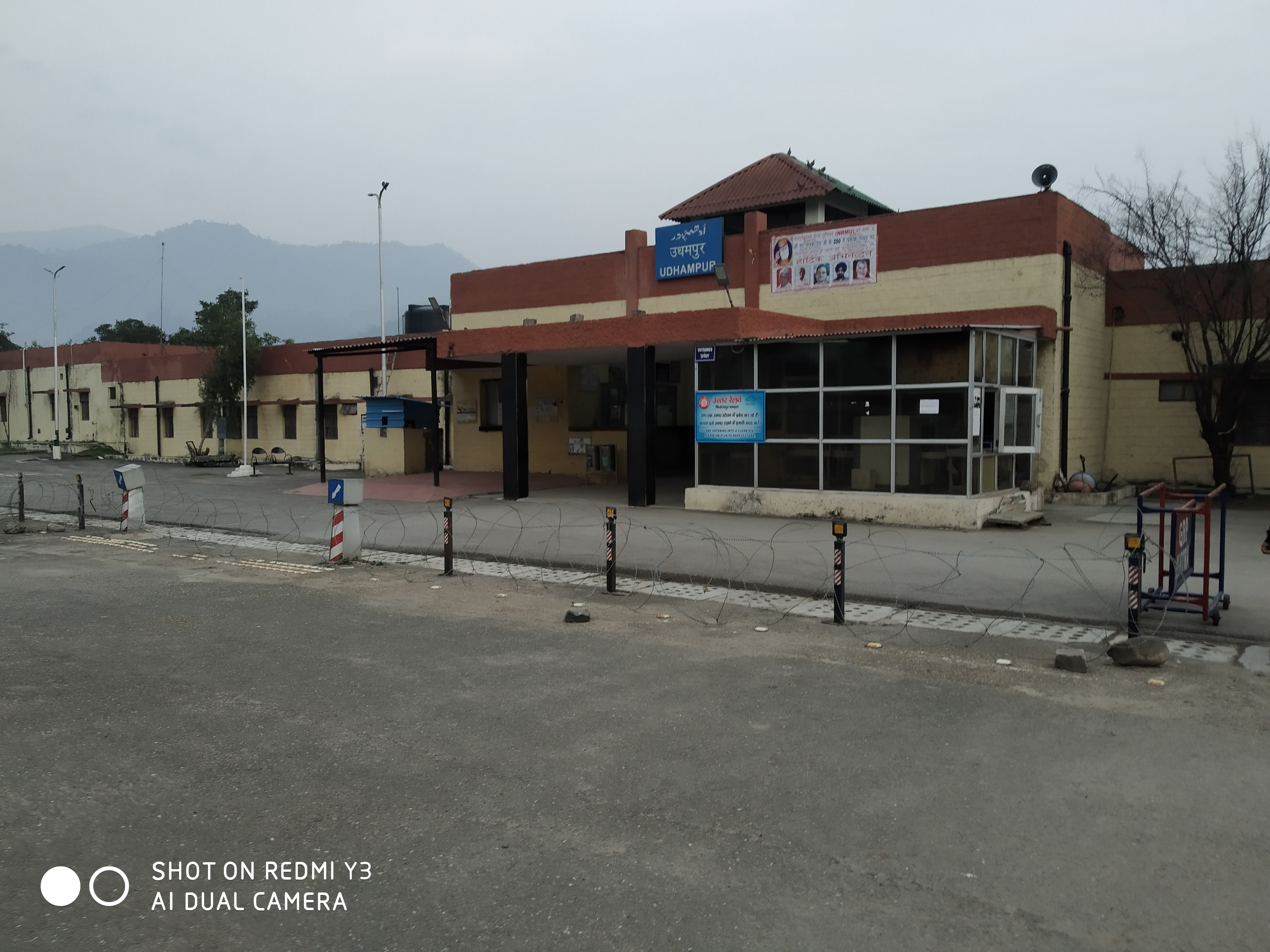
Udhampur railway station

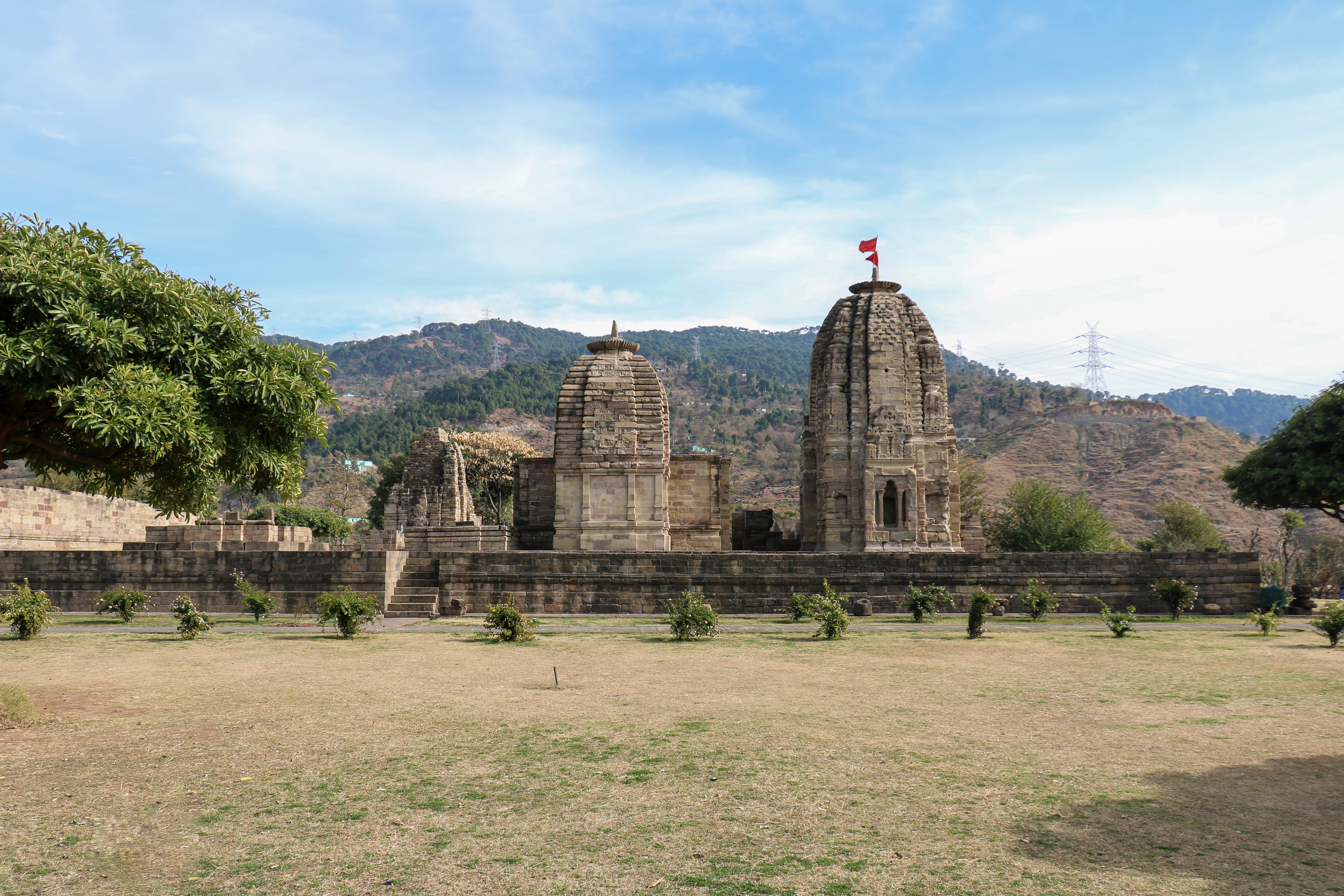
Krimchi temples

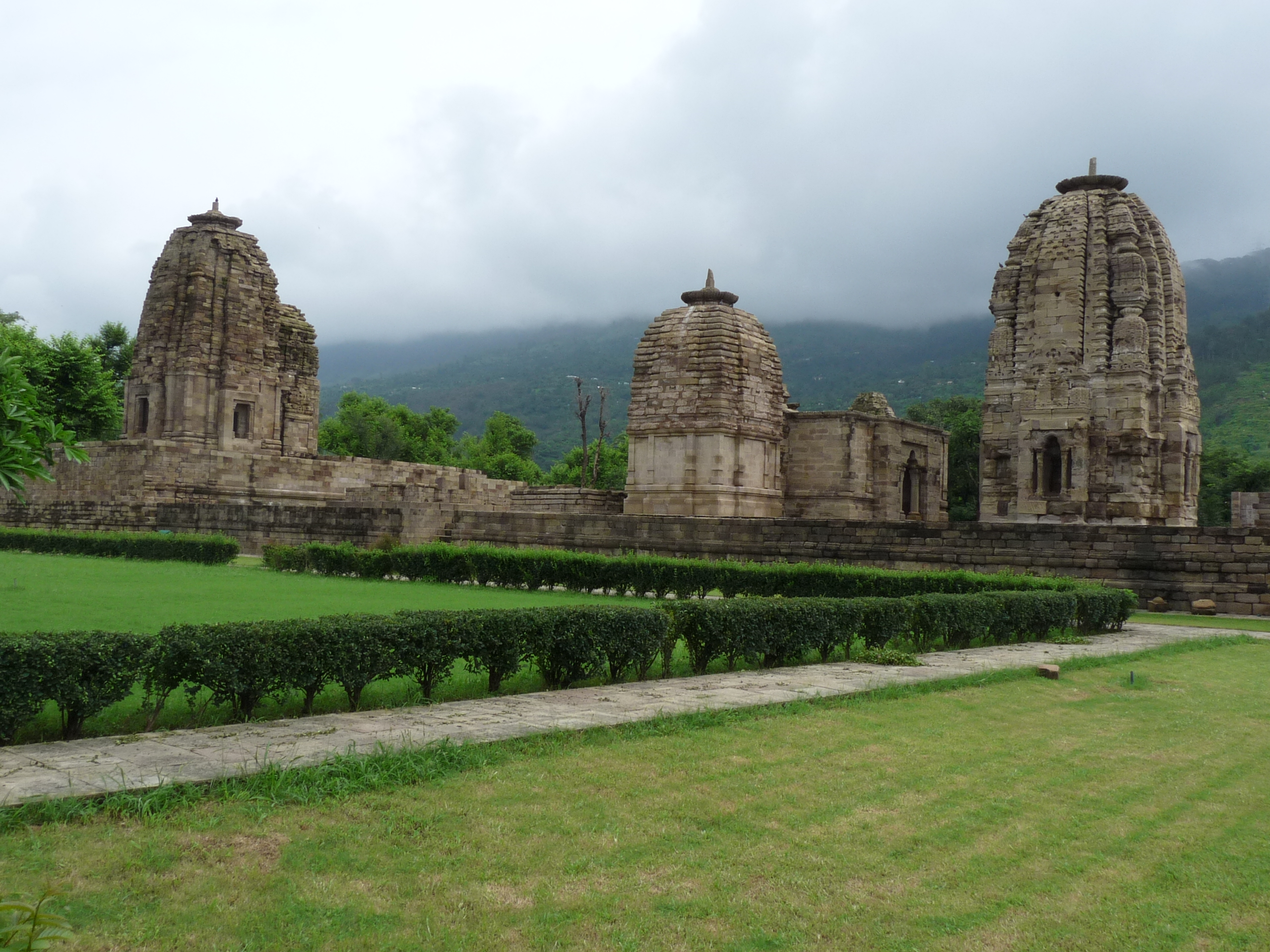
Kirmachi Temples

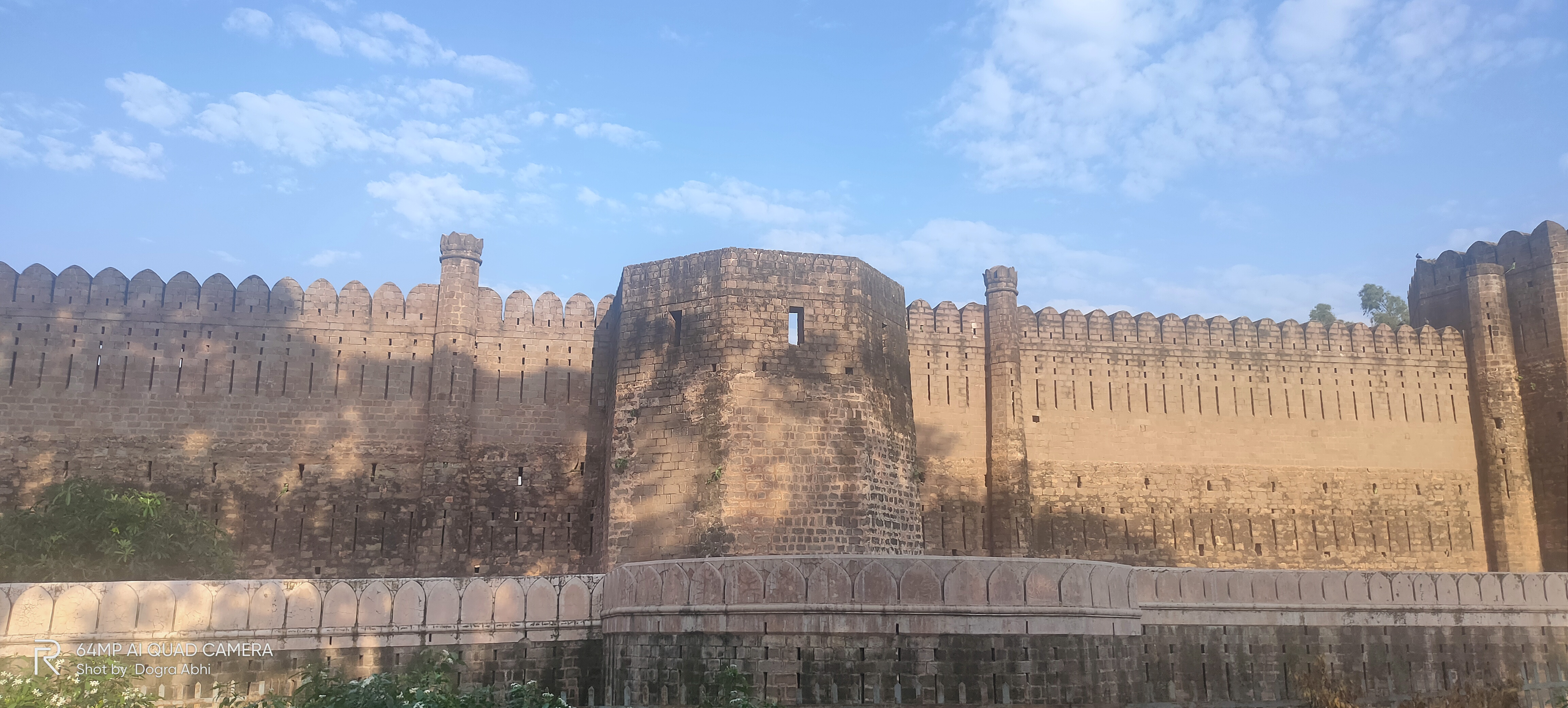
Ramnagar Fort

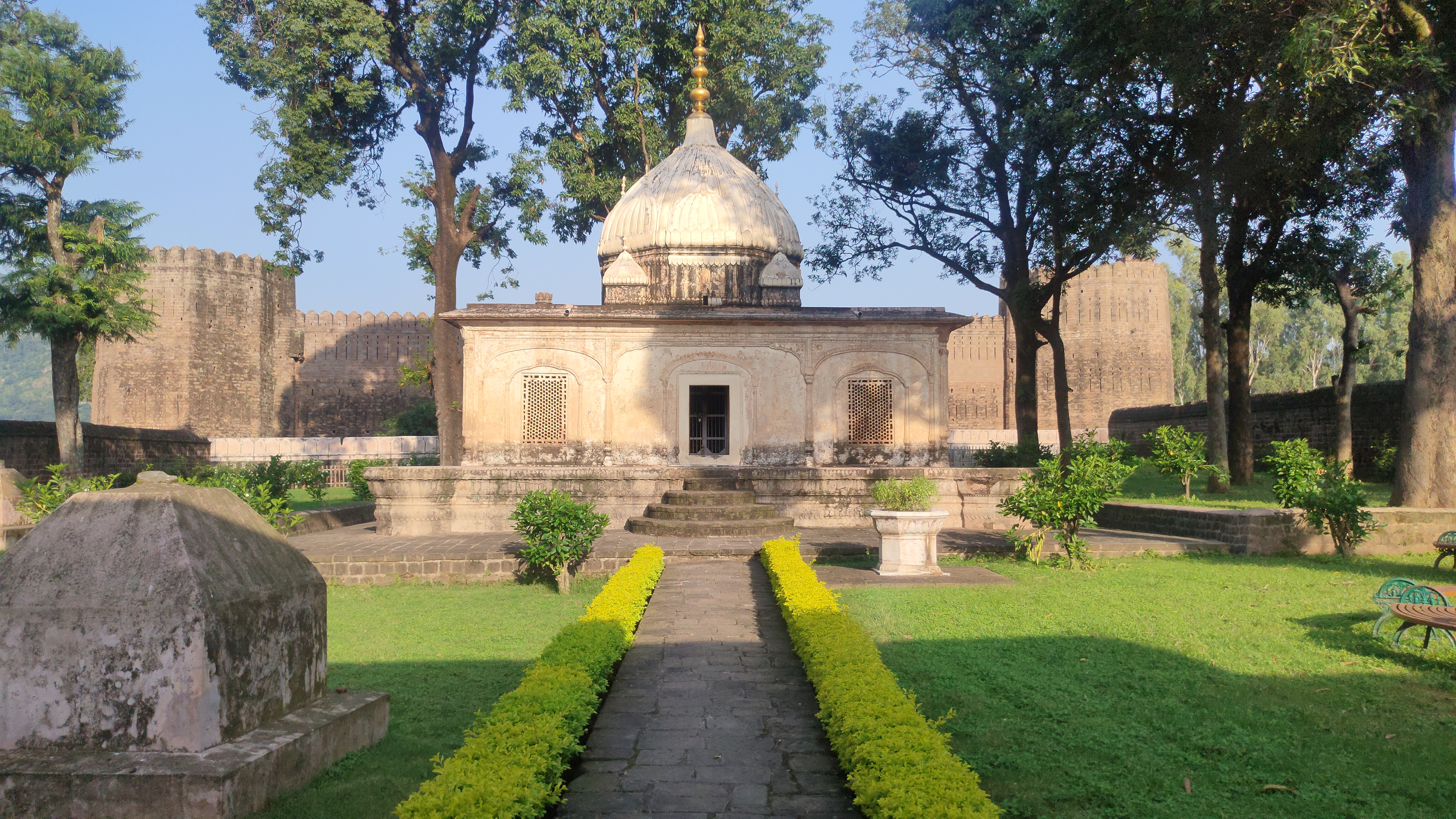
Samadhi of Queen of Raja Suchet Singh

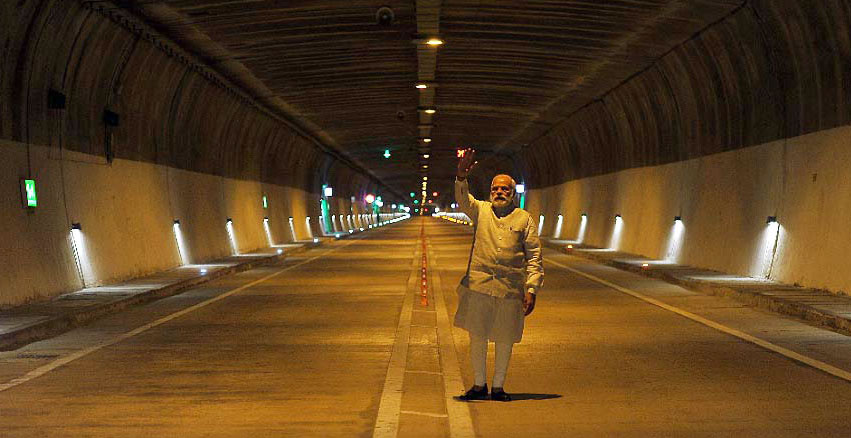
Dr. Syama Prasad Mookerjee Tunnel also known as Chenani Nashri Tunnel

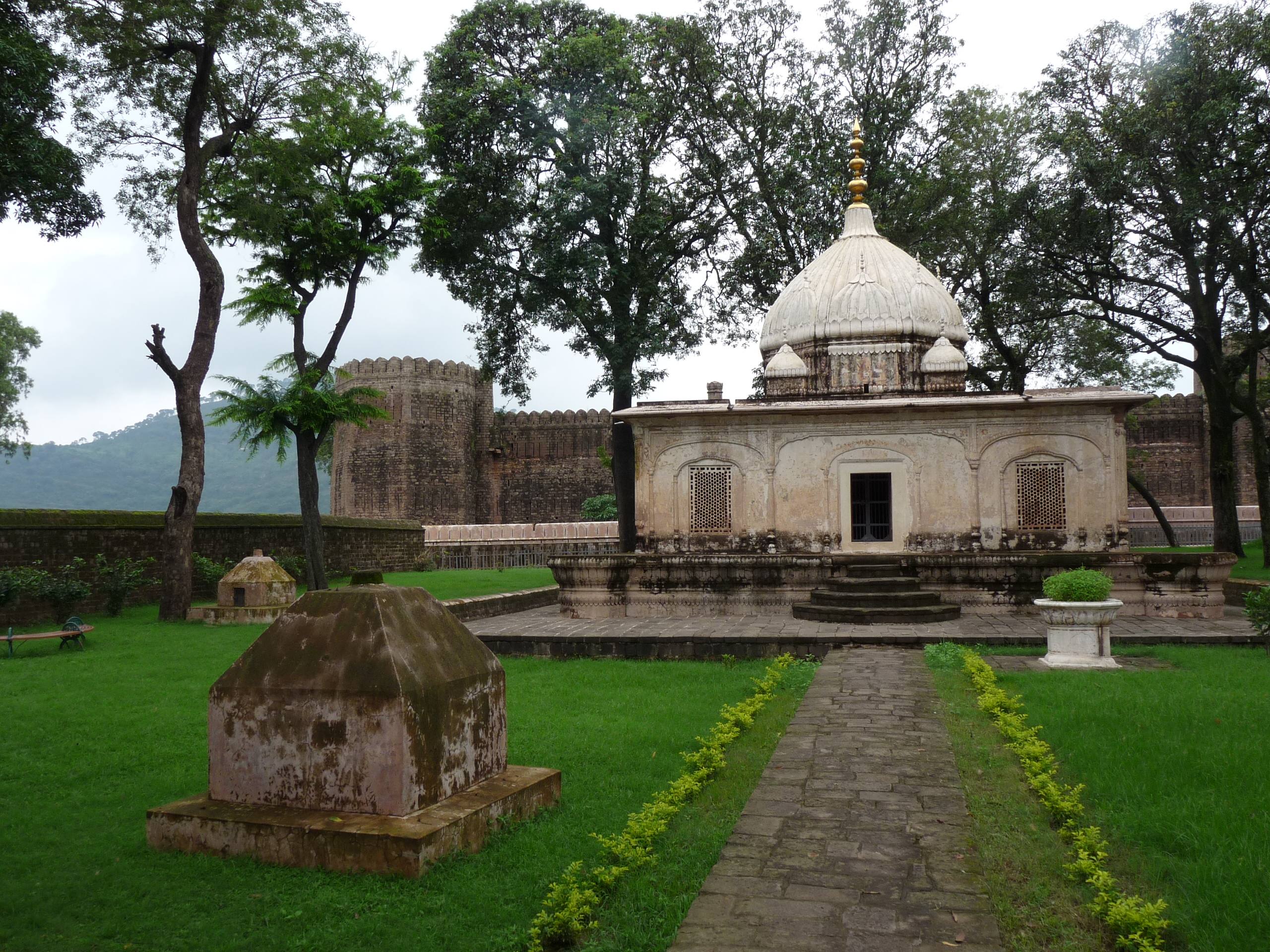
Ramnagar Fort

== See also ==
- Udhampur-Jammu highway
