= Udhampur district =

- District of Jammu and Kashmir administered by India
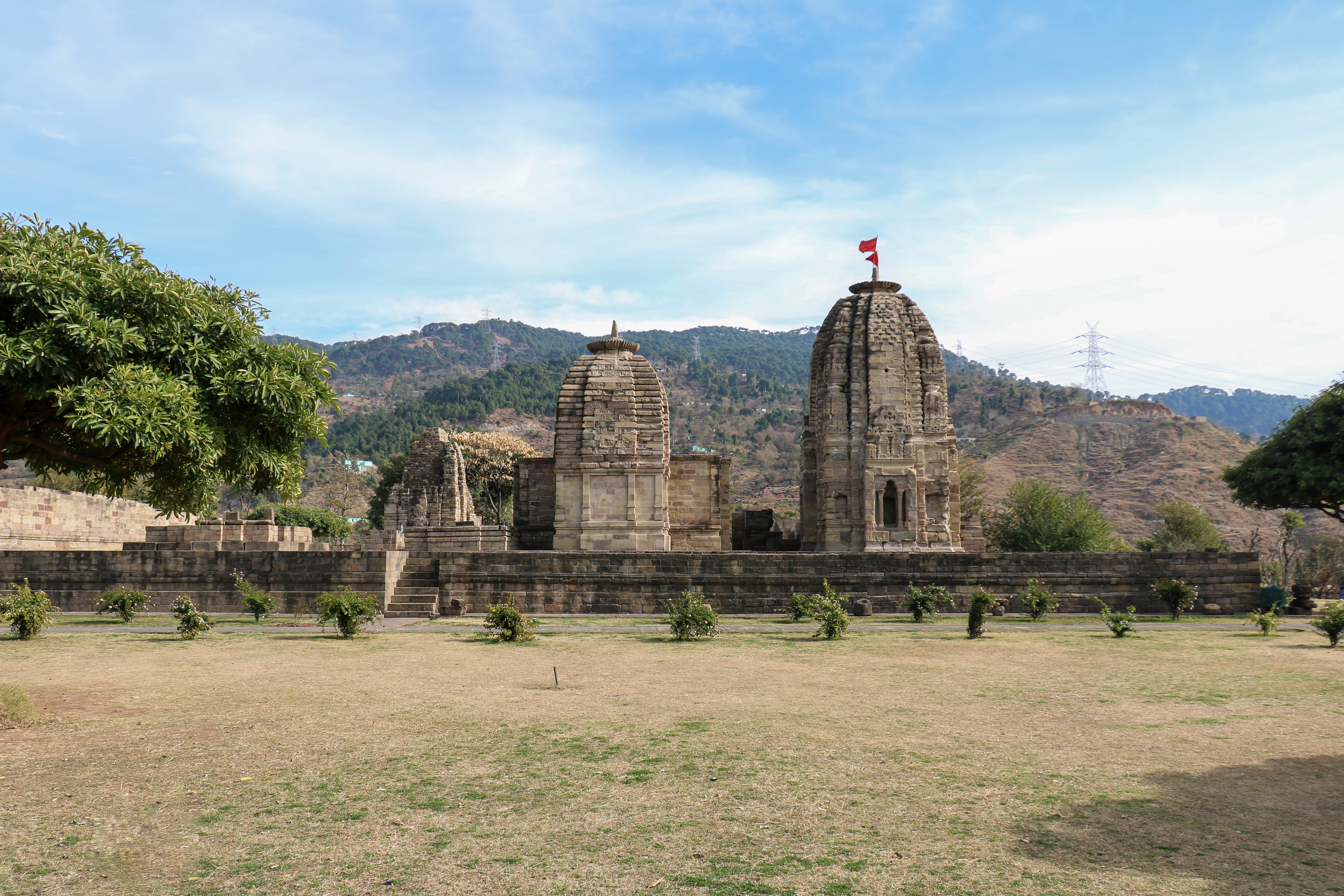
- Kiramchi temples in Udhampur district
- Interactive map of Udhampur district
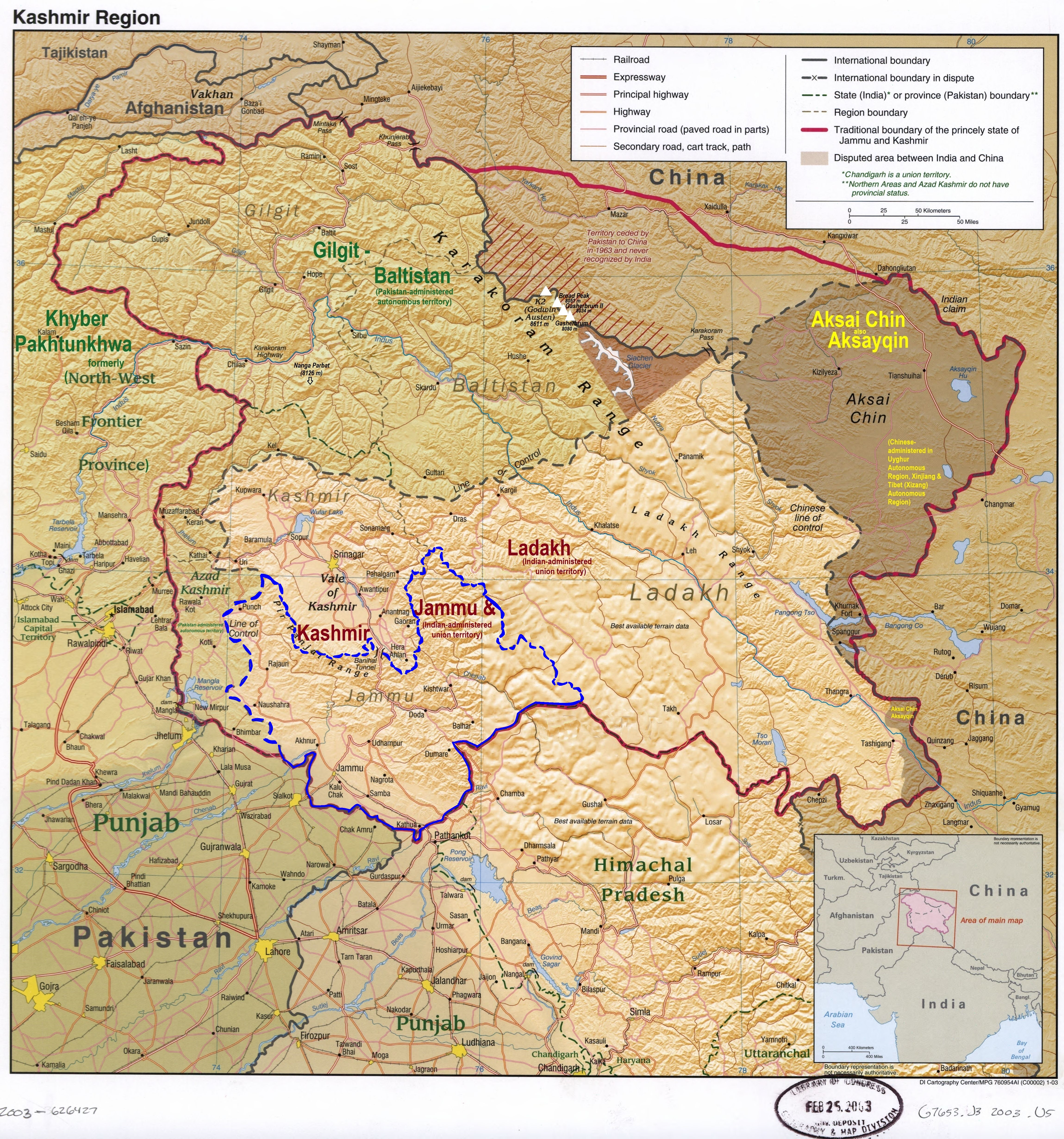
- Udhampur district is in the Jammu division (shown with blue boundary) of Indian-administered Jammu and Kashmir (shaded in tan) in the disputed Kashmir region
- Coordinates (Udhampur): 32.92°N 75.14°E
- Administering country: India
- Union territory: Jammu and Kashmir
- Division: Jammu
- Parliamentary Constituency: Udhampur
- Headquarters: Udhampur

Government
  - Vidhan Sabha constituencies: 17

Area
  - Total: 4,550 km^{2} (1,760 sq mi)

Population (2011)
  - Total: 554,985
  - Density: 122/km^{2} (316/sq mi)

Demographics
  - Literacy: 68.49%
  - Sex ratio: 870
- Time zone: UTC+05:30 (IST)
- Major highways: NH- 44
- Website: https://udhampur.nic.in/

Udhampur district is an administrative district in the Jammu division of Indian-administered Jammu and Kashmir in the disputed Kashmir region. Covering an area of 4,550 square kilometres (1,760 sq mi) in the Himalayan mountains. The district has its headquarters in the city of Udhampur. The Northern Command headquarters of the Indian Army is located in the district.

== Weather conditions ==
Temperature varies considerably in the Udhampur District, as the altitude ranges from 600–3,000 metres (2,000–9,800 ft) above sea level. Chenab, Ans, Tawi, and Ujh are the main rivers. The district is rich in minerals such as coal, bauxite, gypsum, and limestone.

== Administration ==
Udhampur district is comprised eight tehsils (Chenani, Ramnagar Tehsil, Basantgarh, Latti, and Majalta) and seventeen blocks (Dudu Basantgarh, Gordi, Chenani, Bajalta, Panchari, Ramnagar, and Udhampur). Each block consists of a number of panchayats.

== Demographics ==
Historical population
| Year | Pop. | ±% |
|---|---|---|
| 1901 | 155,387 | — |
| 1911 | 174,661 | +12.4% |
| 1921 | 193,132 | +10.6% |
| 1931 | 215,286 | +11.5% |
| 1941 | 238,136 | +10.6% |
| 1951 | 261,935 | +10.0% |
| 1961 | 285,734 | +9.1% |
| 1971 | 374,175 | +31.0% |
| 1981 | 490,057 | +31.0% |
| 1991 | 638,634 | +30.3% |
| 2001 | 843,892 | +32.1% |
| 2011 | 1,008,039 | +19.5% |
† 1951 and 1991 populations are estimated Source: Census of India

The 2011 census indicated the population of the district to be 554,985. With the size of Udhampur being 2,637 square kilometres (1,018 sq mi) at the time, the population density was 210 inhabitants per square kilometre (540/sq mi). Its population growth rate over the decade 2001–2011 was 20.78%. There were 870 females for every 1000 males in the district, varying with religion. The overall literacy rate was 68.49%, with 78.36% for males and 57.10% for females. The majority of the population practised Hinduism. 19.50% of the population lived in urban areas, with the remaining 80.50% living in rural areas. The majority of the population were Dogras. There were a large number of nomadic Gurjars and Bakarwals as well. The Scheduled Castes and Scheduled Tribes accounted for 24.97% and 10.15% of the population of the district, respectively.

=== Religion ===
The religious composition of the district was, as of 2011: 88.12% Hindu, 10.77% Muslim, 0.62% Sikhs, and 0.49% other or not stated religions.

Religion in Udhampur district (2011)
| Religion | Percent |
| Hinduism | 88.12% |
| Islam | 10.77% |
| Sikhism | 0.62% |
| Other or not stated | 0.49% |

Udhampur district: religion, gender ratio, and % urban of population, according to the 2011 Census.
| | Hindu | Muslim | Christian | Sikh | Buddhist | Jain | Other | Not stated | Total |
|---|---|---|---|---|---|---|---|---|---|
| Total | 489,044 | 59,771 | 1,962 | 3,418 | 106 | 57 | 235 | 392 | 554,985 |
| Total | 88.12% | 10.77% | 0.35% | 0.62% | 0.02% | 0.01% | 0.04% | 0.07% | 100.00% |
| Male | 262,013 | 31,219 | 1,118 | 1,974 | 73 | 32 | 119 | 236 | 296,784 |
| Female | 227,031 | 28,552 | 844 | 1,444 | 33 | 25 | 116 | 156 | 258,201 |
| Gender ratio (% female) | 46.4% | 47.8% | 43.0% | 42.2% | 31.1% | 43.9% | 49.4% | 39.8% | 46.5% |
| Sex ratio (no. of females per 1,000 males) | 866 | 915 | 755 | 732 | – | – | – | – | 870 |
| Urban | 96,254 | 7,753 | 1,243 | 2,805 | 62 | 26 | 4 | 61 | 108,208 |
| Rural | 392,790 | 52,018 | 719 | 613 | 44 | 31 | 231 | 331 | 446,777 |
| % Urban | 19.7% | 13.0% | 63.4% | 82.1% | 58.5% | 45.6% | 1.7% | 15.6% | 19.5% |

Sex Ratio in Udhampur District in 2011 Census. (no. females per 1,000 males)
| Religion (and population) | Sex Ratio |
| Hindu (pop 489,044) | 866 |
| Muslim (pop 59,771) | 915 |
| Sikh (pop 3,418) | 732 |
| Other (pop 2,752) | 744 |
| Total (pop 554,985) | 870 |

=== Languages ===
Languages of Udhampur district (2011)
1. Dogri (81.4%)
2. Gojri (5.18%)
3. Hindi (3.67%)
4. Gaddi (2.81%)
5. Pahadi (1.35%)
6. Kashmiri (1.30%)
7. Others (4.33%)

At the time of the 2011 census, 81.36% of the population spoke Dogri, 5.18% Gujari, 3.67% Hindi, 2.81% Gaddi, 1.35% Pahari, and 1.30% Kashmiri as their first language.

== Notable sites ==
=== Mansar Lake ===
Mansar Lake is a lake fringed by forest-covered hills, over a mile in length by half-a-mile in width. The Surinsar-Mansar Lakes were designated by the Ramsar Convention in November 2005. It is also a holy site, sharing the legend of Lake Manasarovar. On the eastern bank of the lake, there is a shrine to Sheshnag, a snake with six heads.

View of Sanasar Lake in the summer

=== Surinsar Lake ===
Surinsar Lake is surrounded by thickly wooded mountain ranges. Surinsar Lake and Mansar Lake are considered to be twin lakes; Mansar is located 30 km away from it. The Surinsar Mansar Wildlife Sanctuary is located in the midst of both of the lakes and supports 3 mammalian species and 15 avifauna species, including cranes. According to Hindu mythological legends, the origin of the lake is closely associated with the legendary warrior of Mahabharat Arjun. It is said to believe that Arjun shot an arrow into the Mansar, and a spring gushed out of the earth, and now it is known as Surinsar Lake.

Dr. Syama Prasad Mookerjee Tunnel

India's longest road tunnel, with a length of 9.28 km (5.77 mi). It is the first tunnel in India with a fully integrated tunnel control system. The tunnel reduces the distance between Jammu and Srinagar by 30 km and travel time by two hours. The all-weather tunnel bypasses snowfall and avalanche prone areas in winter that obstruct NH 44 every winter at places like Patnitop, Kud, and Batote and cause long queues of vehicles – sometimes for days at length.

=== Shool Panishwar Mahadev Temple / Sudh mahadev ===
The 2800-year-old temple Sudh Mahadev, also known as Shool Panishwar Mahadev Temple, is situated in the Chenani Tehsil of Udhampur District. The Temple of Sudh Mahadev is about 50 km away from the District Headquarter of Udhampur. The temple is one of the oldest Shiva Temples of Jammu and Kashmir State. Sudh Mahadev is a shrine dedicated to Lord Shiva, situated at a height of approximately 1225 m. One legend associated with this shrine is as follows:

Once, when Goddess Parvati was in deep prayer, a demon called Sudheet came to pay his respectful obeisance. But his demonic look frightened the Goddess and She made a loud shriek. Her cry revered acted across the mountains surrounding the valley. Lord Shiva was disturbed by the sound. When He opened His eyes, He saw the demon, at whom he hurled His invincible Trident (Holy Trishul). As the trident pierced through Sudheet, he began to chant Lord Shiva's name. Lord Shiva realised the mistake, so He offered to bring Sudheet back to life. But Sudheet refused to come back to life telling Lord Shiva that only by dying at His hands would he be able to obtain moksha (Salvation). Moved by the demon's words, Lord Shiva ordered that, henceforth, Sudheet's name would be taken before His own at the place where he was killed. That is how the place where Goddess Parvati used to worship a shivling came to be known as Sudhmahadev.

=== Krimchi temples ===
Krimchi is the site of one of the oldest temple complexes of the state. Believed to have been constructed in the 11th – 12th century, this group of temples is also locally known as the Pandava Temples. It consists of four large, and three small temples dedicated to Lord Shiv. The architecture of the temples shows Greek (Hellenic) influences. As per the legends, Raja Kichak of Mahabharat was said to be the creator of Krimchi and the Kingdom. It is also said that Pandavas, while in exile, remained there for a long period.

=== Latti ===
Latti is a village in the Dudu Block in Udhampur District. It is located 83 km East from the District Headquarter of Udhampur.

=== Aparneshar Temple (Mantalai temple) ===
Aparneshar Temple, or Mantalai Temple, is found at an elevation of 1450 metres from the ground and is surrounded by deodar trees. Religiously, this is the place where Mother Parvati was born and married Lord Shiva. One divine rock (patthar) related to the wedding of Parvati and Shiva can also be spotted in this shrine. Ever since Dhirendra Brahmachari, the Yogic mentor of former Indian Prime Minister Indira Gandhi, was killed in an air crash in June 1994, property worth hundreds of crore in Mantalai Aparna Asharam is gathering dust. This facility is now being developed as a state-of-the-art International Yoga Center.

=== Gauri Kund ===
Gauri Kund is a place located in Sudmahadev where Parvati bathed regularly.

== Temples ==
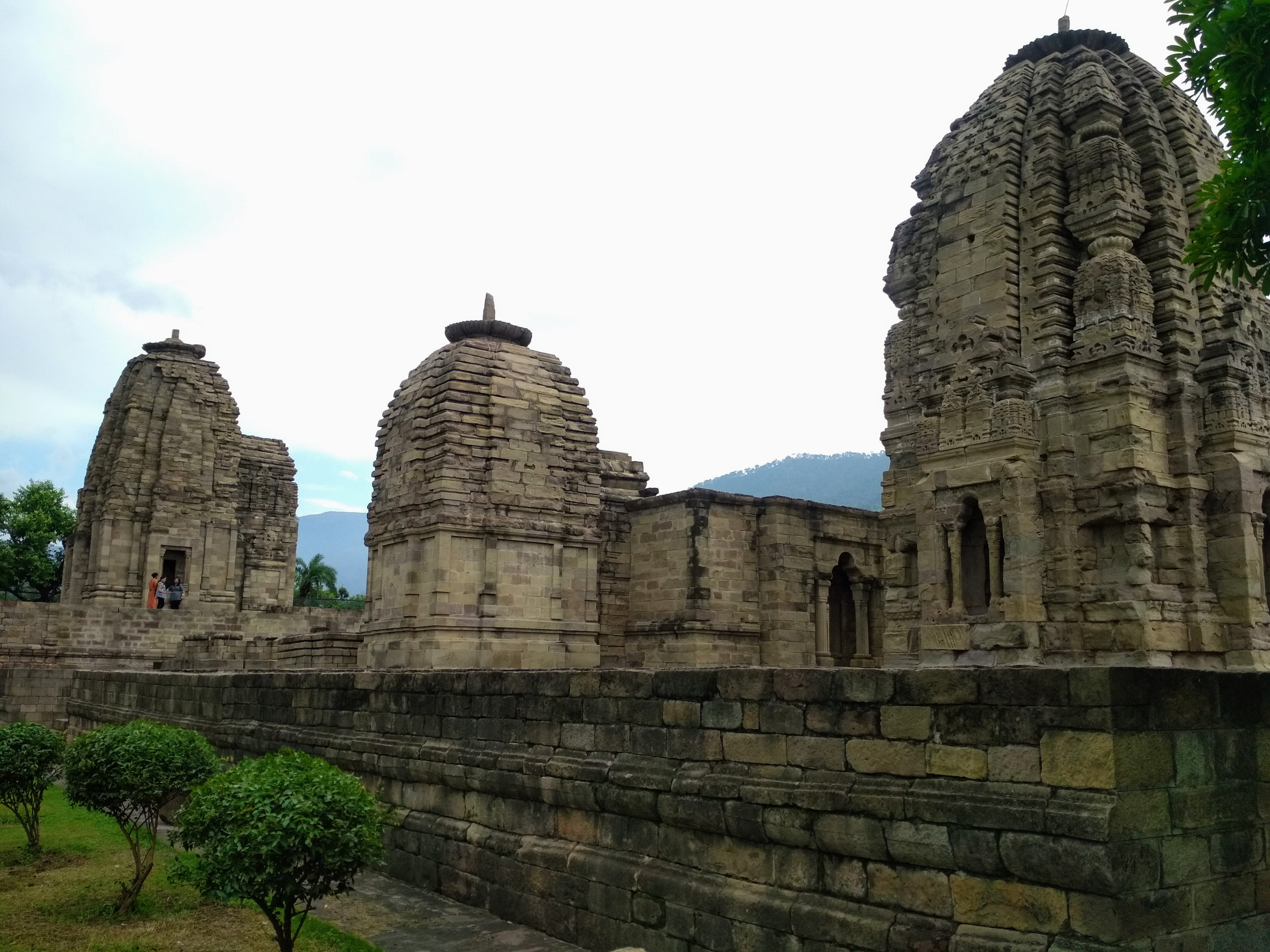
Krimchi Temples ( Pandava Mandir)

Owing to a multitude of shrines and temples, Udhampur is also known as Devika Nagari, meaning City of the Goddess. Places of worship located in the district include the Aparneshar Temple (Parvati Janmbhoomi), Sudh Mahadev (Shool Panishwar Mahadev), Babore Temples, Kansar Devta's shrine, Shaankari Devta mandir, Shiv Khori Cave Temple, Bhairav Ghati, Krimchi Temples, Shiv Parvathi Cave shrine, Cairhai, Mutal Pingla Devi shrine, Shri Mata Vaishno Devi shrine, Deva Mayi Maa Temple, and the Sheshnag Shrine.

In the 7th century text the Nilamata Purana by Nila Muni, it is mentioned that the Devika River is a manifestation of the mother Goddess Parvati to benefit people of Mader Desha, covering the areas between the Ravi, Chenab, and Devika rivers, and it appears on the Shiv Ratri. Lord Shiva and his consort Uma are believed to manifest together at eight places alongside the Devika River. The subterranean Devika presently flows under a sandy surface.

In Devi Mahatmya, it is mentioned that there is no need to perform Japa or any ritual for obtaining spiritual benefits at this pilgrimage site but only to touch the Devika waters or bathe in them. Water from the Devika can be retrieved by digging a foot into the sand bed. Cremation on the sands of Devika is considered as meritorious as on the banks of the Ganges at Kashi.

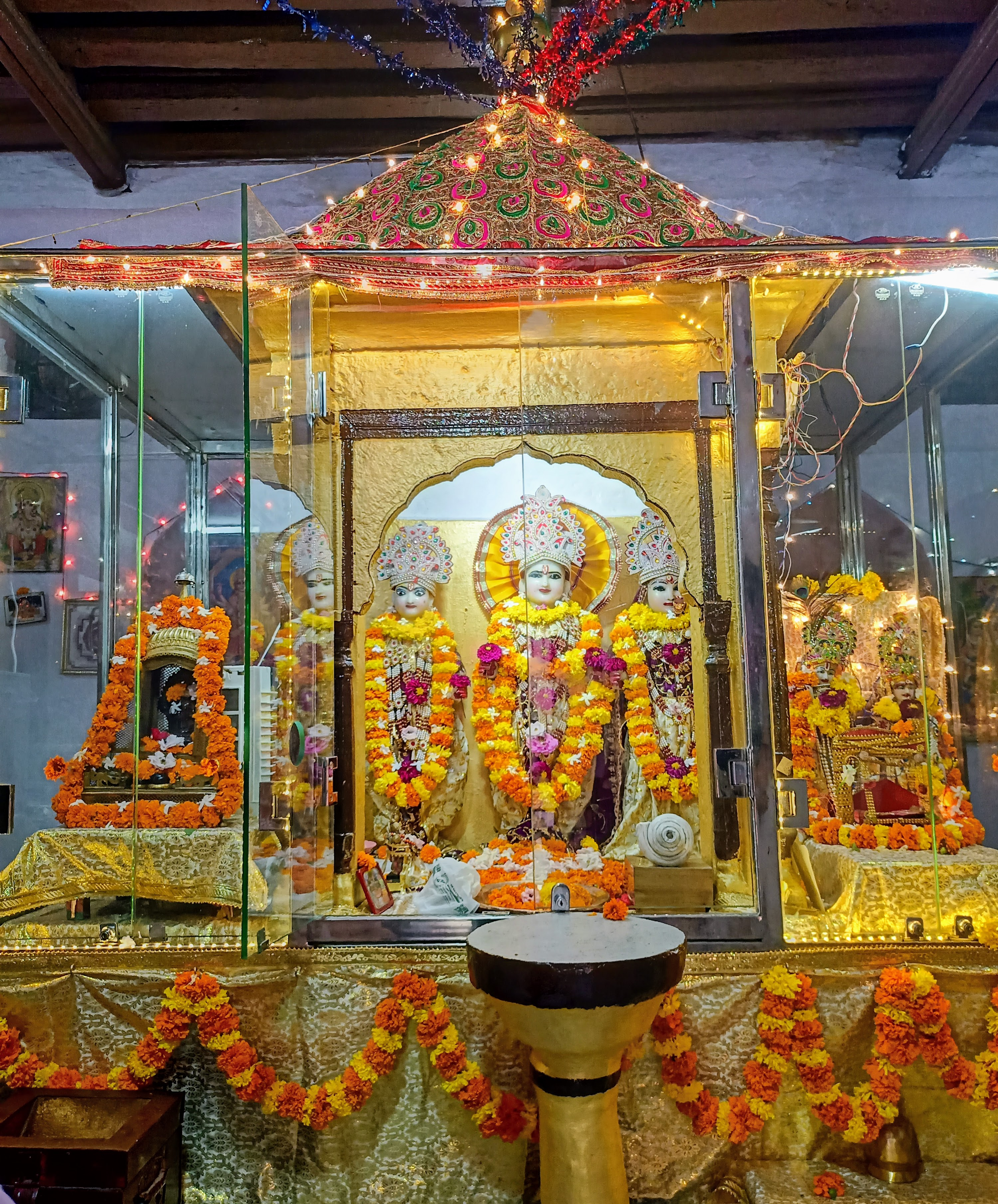
Idols of Ram, Lakshman, and Sita in Pandu Mandir, Udhampur

Pandu Mandir (पण्डु मंदिर), located in the heart of Udhampur city, is a temple dedicated to Bhagwan Ram. It is believed to be 200 years old and is a centre of devotion for the people of Udhampur City. "Pandu mandir Street" is also famous for its Kachalu and Shola kulcha.

== Important localities ==
- Balwalta
- Battal baaliyan
- Chenani
- Cheryaai
- Chopra Bazaar
- Domail
- Jaganoo
- Jakheni
- Khoon
- Majalta
- Mansar Lake
- Manwal
- Mongri
- Narsu
- Palthyar
- Pancheri
- Patnitop
- Ramnagar
- Rehamble
- Sansoo
- Sen Brahmana
- Thaathi
- Thalora
- Tikri
- Udhampur
- Latti Dhuna

== Military ==
The Northern Command Headquarters of the Indian Army is based in Udhampur and consists of three Corps, the XIV, XV, and XVI. All units are deployed along the Line of Control in Kashmir, with the exceptions of the 39th Infantry Division and the 2nd, 3rd, and 16th Independent Armored Brigades.

Prior to Independence, Northern Command Headquarters was located at Rawalpindi, and was responsible for the defence of Northwest India. After Partition, the Command Headquarters was allocated to Pakistan. In India, a new headquarters designated as Western Command was created at Shimla to look after the Northern borders with Pakistan and some portions of Tibet.

The need for a separate headquarters in the North was felt during the First Kashmir War in 1948. The experience of wars in 1962, 1965, and 1971 reinforced the conviction that the North needed to be commanded by a headquarters at Shimla. The 1965 and 1971 wars demonstrated that the area under General Officer Commanding-in-Chief (GOC-in-C) Western Command was too vast for effective command.

Accordingly, in 1971, duplicate headquarters with duplicated staff were set up at Shimla and Bhatinda. After 1971, Headquarter Northern Command was established at Udhampur, taking over responsibility for Jammu, Kashmir, and Ladakh.

It was decided in June 1972 to raise Northern Command at Udhampur, with two corps under it, to look after the defence of the region. This strength has now increased to three corps. Northern Command now controls this sensitive region of the country, which covers the entire Union Territory of Jammu and Kashmir and contiguous portions of Punjab and Himachal Pradesh.

The first GOC-in-C of Northern Command was Lieutenant General Premindra Singh Bhagat. The command has been in operational mode since its inception. It saw a number of high and low-intensity operations.

Troops of the Northern Command have been manning the highest battlefield in the world at the Siachen Glacier where the altitude of the posts varies from 15,000 to 23,000 ft.

This command has played a crucial role in fighting against the proxy war that began in 1990. Over 18,000 militants were killed, and more than 80 tons of explosives and almost 40,000 weapons were recovered. The command also took the onus of fencing the Line of Control to curtail the levels of infiltration and exfiltration.

The XIV Corps is the field formation that is responsible for Ladakh and Kargil and is responsible for intelligence about enemy positions near the Line of Control. The Kargil operation in 1999 was primarily the responsibility of the 8 Mountain Division, the formation of which was rushed after intrusions were detected in May 1999. 56 Mountain Brigade deployed two battalions to contain intrusions in Mashkoh and Dras, while the third battalion (18 Grenadiers) established the crucial firm base 1000 feet below Tololing at 15,000 feet. 8 Mountain Division was tasked to clear nearly 50 pockets of intrusions in Mashkoh. Of the 16 battalions involved in the war, only 10 were employed at Kargil. The 8 Mountain Division played a major role in evicting intrusions and defeating the Pakistan army at Kargil. It switched in 1990 from a counterinsurgency division in the North-East to the Srinagar valley to a high-altitude mountain division at Kargil.

XVI Corps is believed to be one of the largest corps in the world, as it consists of five divisions.

As of mid-1999, there were two divisions, comprising approximately 15,000 soldiers each, manning the LoC and the Line of Actual Control with China from Kargil to Siachen. While the 8 Mountain Division had been given sole charge of guarding 150 kilometres of the border in the Kargil sector, the 3 Infantry Division was in charge of Siachen and the Aksai Chin border. As the 15 Corps mobilised its forces for the counterattack, and elements of the 18 Mountain Division poured into the various sectors of Kargil, the people of Jammu and Kashmir were steadfast against the enemy forces.

With the induction of 14 Corps into Ladakh, the supply-load on the Army Service Corps (ASC) increased tremendously. Given the politico-military situation on India's borders, a large portion of the army was deployed in some of the most inhospitable terrain. As of early 2002, these units had been joined by Central Command's I Corps Strike Force, consisting of three divisions.

The Indian Army announced the creation of its new command, known as South-Western Command, with its headquarters at Jaipur, which formally came into being on 18 April 2005. the South-Western Command operates in conjunction with the Udhampur-based Northern Command and Chandimandir-based Western Command. The reallocation of forces to the South-Western Command from Northern and Western Command was not immediately apparent.

In mid-2005, the Indian Army raised a new corps at Yol Cantt in Kangra Valley of Himachal Pradesh for effective operational preparedness in the western sector. The new corps, christened 9 Corps, comprises the 26 and 29 Infantry Divisions, which had previously been allocated to XVI Corps / Nagrota Corps, and a number of brigades.

== Politics ==
Udhampur District has four assembly constituencies: Udhampur West, Udhampur East, Chenani, and Ramnagar.

== See also ==
- Talwara (Udhampur district)
