= SMVD Katra–Amritsar Vande Bharat Express =

Mini Vande Bharat Express train route in India

SMVD Katra–Amritsar Junction Vande Bharat Express
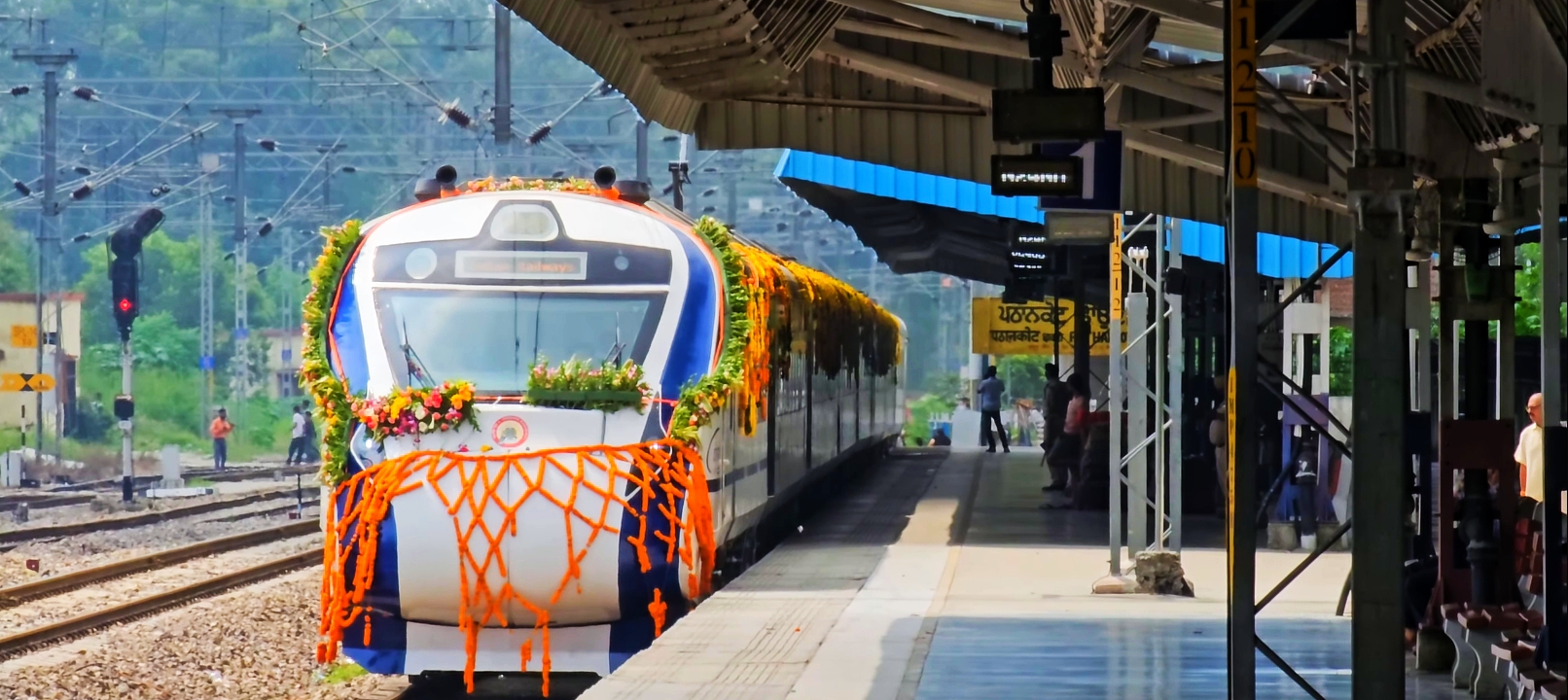
- SMVD Katra–Amritsar Junction Vande Bharat Express at Pathankot Cantonment railway station

Overview
- Service type: Vande Bharat Express
- Locale: Jammu and Kashmir and Punjab
- First service: 10 August 2025; 14 months ago (Inaugural); 11 August 2025; 14 months ago (Commercial) (TBC)
- Current operator: Northern Railways (NR)

Route
- Termini: Shri Mata Vaishno Devi Katra (SVDK); Amritsar Junction (ASR)
- Stops: 04
- Distance travelled: 285 km (177 mi)
- Average journey time: 05 hrs 05 mins
- Service frequency: Six days a week (Note: Except Saturdays)
- Train number: 26406 / 26405
- Line used: Amritsar–Jammu line

On-board services
- Classes: AC Chair Car, AC Executive Chair Car
- Seating arrangements: Airline style; Rotatable seats
- Sleeping arrangements: No
- Catering facilities: On-board catering
- Observation facilities: Large windows in all coaches
- Entertainment facilities: On-board WiFi; Infotainment system; Electric outlets; Reading light; Seat pockets; Bottle holder; Tray table
- Baggage facilities: Overhead racks
- Other facilities: Kavach

Technical
- Rolling stock: Mini Vande Bharat 2.0
- Track gauge: Indian gauge
- Electrification: 25 kV 50 Hz AC overhead line
- Operating speed: 56 km/h (35 mph) (Avg.)
- Average length: 192 metres (630 ft) (08 coaches)
- Track owner: Indian Railways
- Rake maintenance: SMVD Katra (SVDK)

The 26406/26405 SMVD Katra–Amritsar Vande Bharat Express is India's 72nd Vande Bharat Express train, which connects the divine Vaishno Devi Temple in the Temple City of Katra in the Union Territory of Jammu and Kashmir with the economic metropolitan and capital city,Amritsar in the northwestern side of Punjab, India.

This express train was inaugurated on 10 August 2025, by Prime Minister Narendra Modi via video-conferencing from the Silicon City of Bengaluru in Karnataka.

== Overview ==
This train is currently operated by Indian Railways, connecting Shri Mata Vaishno Devi Katra, Jammu Tawi, Pathankot Junction, Gurdaspur, Batala Junction and Amritsar Junction. It is currently operated with train numbers 26406/26405 on 6 days a week basis.

== Rakes ==
It is the 67th 2nd Generation Mini Vande Bharat Express train which was designed and manufactured by the Integral Coach Factory at Perambur, Chennai under the Make in India initiative.

== Service ==
The 26406/26405 SMVD Katra–Amritsar Vande Bharat Express currently operates 6 days a week, covering a distance of 285 km (177 mi) in a travel time of 05 hrs 05 mins with average speed of 65 km/h. The Maximum Permissible Speed (MPS) is 110 km/h (68 mph).

== See also ==
- Vande Bharat Express
- Tejas Express
- Gatiman Express
- Shri Mata Vaishno Devi Katra railway station
- Amritsar Junction railway station
