= Hazur Sahib Nanded–Mumbai CSMT Vande Bharat Express =

Vande Bharat Express train route in India

Hazur Sahib Nanded - Mumbai CSMT Vande Bharat Express
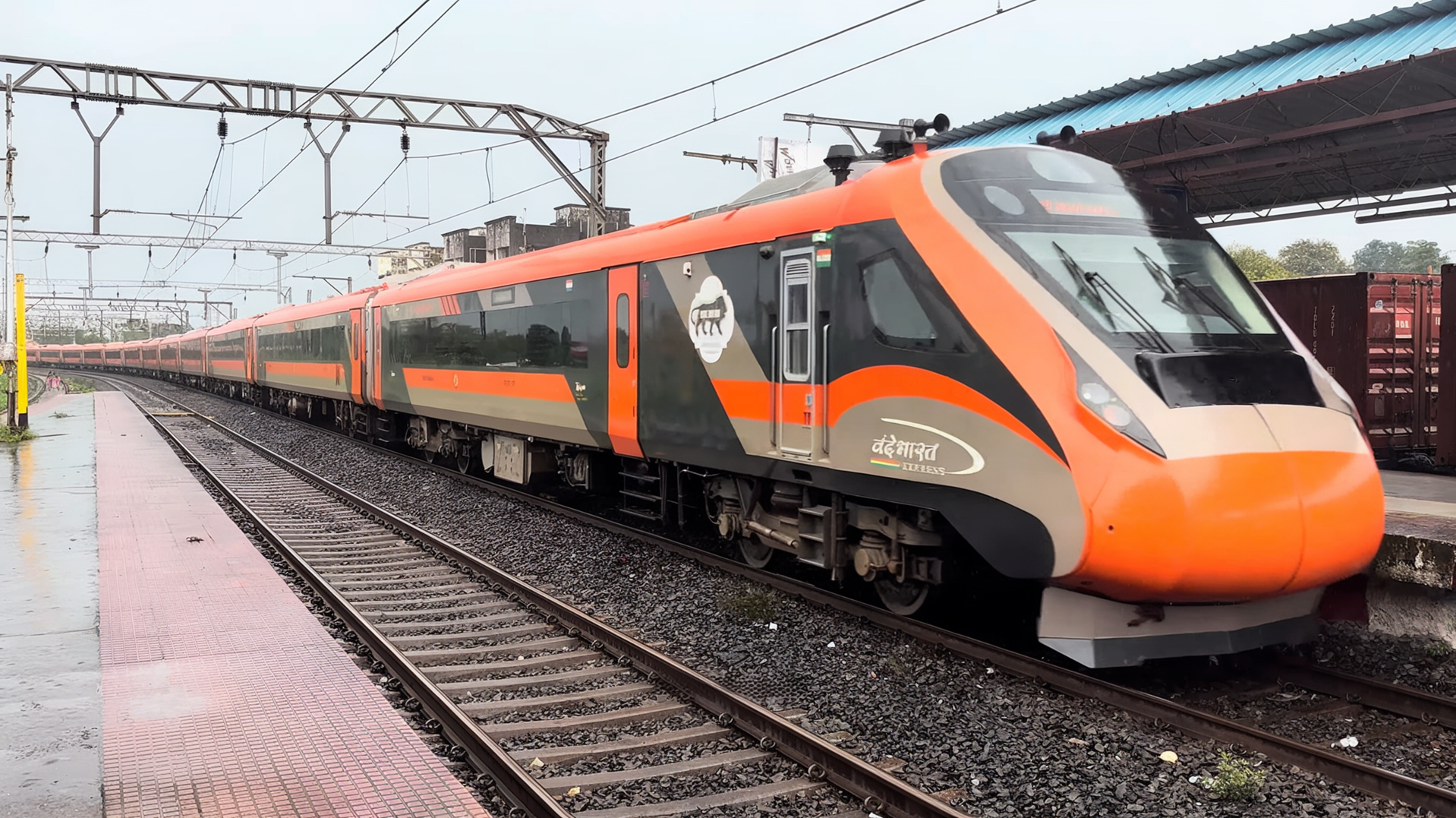

Overview
- Service type: Vande Bharat Express
- Locale: Maharastra
- First service: 30 December 2023 (Inaugural); 2 January 2024; 2 years ago (Commercial) (Extension to Hazur Sahib Nanded); 28 August 2025; 9 months ago
- Current operator: South Central Railways (SCR)

Route
- Termini: Hazur Sahib Nanded (NED); Chhatrapati Shivaji Maharaj Terminus (CSMT)
- Stops: 08
- Distance travelled: 608 km (378 mi)
- Average journey time: 09 hrs 25 mins
- Service frequency: Six days a week (Note: 20705 - Except Wednesdays | 20706 - Except Thursdays)
- Train number: 20705 / 20706
- Lines used: Mumbai–Kalyan section; Kalyan–Bhusawal section (till Manmad Jn.); Manmad–Secunderabad line (till Nanded )

On-board services
- Classes: AC Chair Car, AC Executive Car
- Seating arrangements: Yes
- Sleeping arrangements: No
- Catering facilities: On Board Catering
- Observation facilities: Large windows in all coaches
- Baggage facilities: Overhead Racks
- Other facilities: Kavach

Technical
- Rolling stock: Mini Vande Bharat 2.0 (Last service: 26 August 2025); Vande Bharat 3.0 (First service: 28 August 2025)
- Track gauge: Indian gauge 1,676 mm (5 ft 6 in) broad gauge
- Electrification: 25 kV 50 Hz AC Overhead line
- Operating speed: 65 km/h (40 mph) (Avg.)
- Average length: 480 metres (1,570 ft) (20 Coaches)
- Track owner: Indian Railways
- Rake maintenance: Hazur Sahib Nanded (NED)
- Rake sharing: 22225 / 22226 CSMT - Solapur Vande Bharat Express

The 20705/20706 Hazur Sahib Nanded - Mumbai CSMT Vande Bharat Express is India's 41st Vande Bharat Express train, running across the state of Maharashtra, which will start from Hazur Sahib Nanded and will terminate at Mumbai CSMT in India. This will be the fourth express train towards Chhatrapati Shivaji Maharaj Terminus (CSMT).

This express train was inaugurated on 30 December 2023 by Prime Minister Narendra Modi via video conferencing from Ayodhya Dham Junction.

== Overview ==
This train is operated by Indian Railways, connecting Hazur Sahib Nanded, Parbhani Jn, Jalna, Aurangabad, Manmad Jn, Nashik Road, Kalyan Jn, Thane, Dadar Ctrl and Mumbai CSMT. It is currently operated with train numbers 20705/20706 on 6 days a week basis.

From the South Central Railways zonal office, there has been an approved extension to originate or terminate to&fro Hazur Sahib Nanded from 27 August 2025.

== Rakes ==
It was the thirty-ninth 2nd Generation and twenty-fifth Mini Vande Bharat 2.0 Express train which was designed and manufactured by the Integral Coach Factory at Perambur, Chennai under the Make in India Initiative.

=== Coach Augmentation ===
As per latest updates, this express train will be augmented with 12 additional AC coaches, thereby running with Vande Bharat 3.0 trainset W.E.F. 28 August 2025 in order to enhance passenger capacity and make travel smoother and more convenient on this popular route.

== Service ==
The 20705/20706 Hazur Sahib Nanded - Mumbai CSMT Vande Bharat Express operates six days a week, covering a distance of 608 km (378 mi) in a travel time of 09 hours 25 mins with an average speed of 65 km/h (40 mph). The service has 6 intermediate stops. The Maximum Permissible Speed is 130 km/h (81 mph).

== See also ==
- Mumbai CSMT–Solapur Vande Bharat Express
- Vande Bharat Express
- Tejas Express
- Gatimaan Express
- Mumbai CSMT Terminus
- Jalna railway station
