= Amritsar–Shri Mata Vaishno Devi Katra railway line =

Rail line in Punjab and Jammu and Kashmir

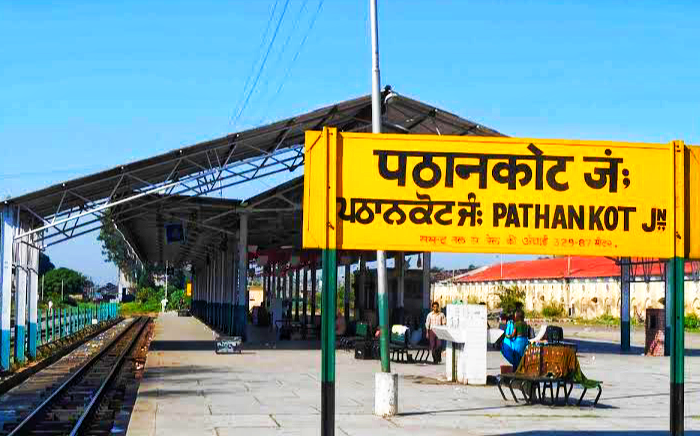
- Pathankot Junction is an important railway station on Amritsar–Shri Mata Vaishno Devi Katra railway line

Overview
- Native name: अमृतसर–श्री माता वैष्णो देवी कटरा रेल लाइन
- Status: Operational
- Owner: Indian Railways
- Locale: Punjab and Jammu and Kashmir
- Termini: Amritsar Junction (ASR); Shri Mata Vaishno Devi Katra railway station (SMVD)

Service
- Type: Regional rail, passenger and freight
- Operator: Northern Railway

History
- Opened: 1975

Technical
- Track length: 284 KM
- Number of tracks: 2
- Track gauge: 5 ft 6 in (1,676 mm) broad gauge
- Electrification: 25 kV 50 Hz AC overhead line
- Operating speed: Up to 110 km/h
- Highest elevation: Amritsar Junction 233 m (764 ft); Beas Junction 234 m (768 ft); Jalandhar Cantonment 256 m (840 ft); Pathankot Cantonment352 m (1,155 ft); Jammu Tawi 414 m (1,358 ft)

The Amritsar–Shri Mata Vaishno Devi Katra railway line is a broad-gauge railway line connecting Amritsar in Punjab to Shri Mata Vaishno Devi Katra railway station in Jammu and Kashmir. The line is operational and serves as a vital corridor for both passenger and freight trains in northern India. The route also serves pilgrims traveling to Shri Mata Vaishno Devi Katra.

== History ==
The line was constructed in the year 1975 to enhance connectivity between Punjab and Jammu and Kashmir. Over the years, it has undergone upgrades, including track doubling and partial electrification to improve speed and efficiency.

== Route and major stations ==
The line covers a distance of approximately 207 km, with the following major stations:

- Amritsar Junction (ASR)
- Verka Junction (VKA)
- Batala Junction (BAT)
- Dina Nagar (DNN)
- Dhariwal (DHW)
- Gurdaspur (GSP)
- Pathankot Junction (PTK)
- Hira Nagar (HRNR)
- Jammu Tawi (JAT)

== Electrification ==
The line has been partially electrified with 25 kV 50 Hz AC overhead traction. Full electrification is planned to further improve operational efficiency.

== Services ==
Several trains operate on this route, including:

- Bathinda–Jammu Tawi Express (19225)
- SMVD Katra–Amritsar Vande Bharat Express (26405)
- Shri Mata Vaishno Devi Katra Express (SBIB SVDK Express, 19415)
- Muri Express (18101)
- Sambalpur–Jammu Tawi Express (18309)

== Future developments ==
There are proposals for high-speed rail corridors on this route, which aim to reduce travel time and increase capacity. Other modernization projects include further electrification and track doubling.

== See also ==
- Indian Railways
- Northern Railway zone
- Shri Mata Vaishno Devi Katra railway station
