= Srinagar–Jammu Tawi Vande Bharat Express =

Mini Vande Bharat Express train route in India

Srinagar – Jammu Tawi Vande Bharat Express
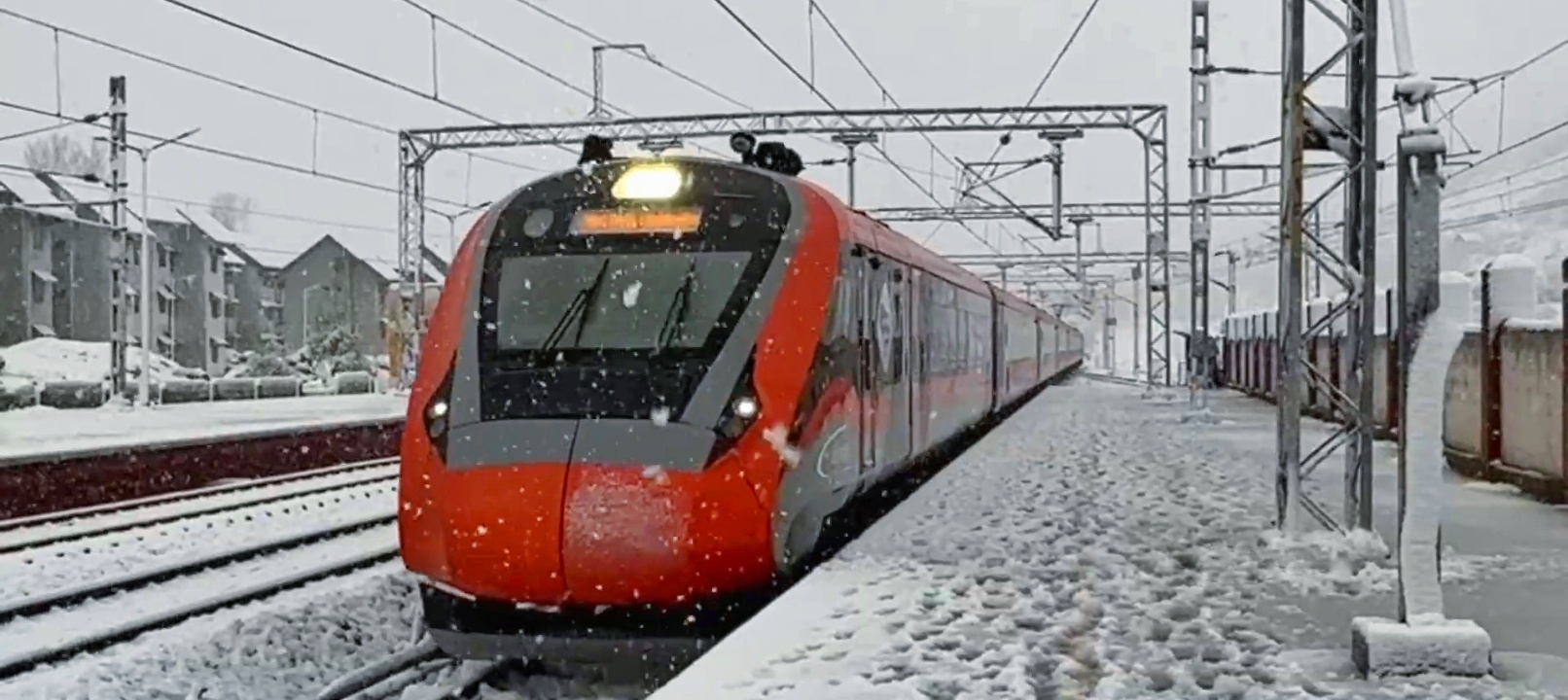
- J&K’s first Vande Bharat train At Banihal railway station

Overview
- Service type: Vande Bharat Express
- Locale: Jammu and Kashmir
- First service: June 06, 2025; 17 months ago (Inaugural); June 07 2025; 16 months ago (Commercial); April 30 2026; 6 months ago (Extension)
- Current operator: Northern Railways (NR)

Route
- Termini: Srinagar (SINA); Jammu Tawi (JAT)
- Stops: 3
- Distance travelled: 269 km (167 mi)
- Average journey time: 04 hrs 45 mins
- Service frequency: Six days a week (Note: Except Wednesdays)
- Train number: 26404 / 26403
- Line used: Jammu–Baramulla line

On-board services
- Classes: AC Chair Car, AC Executive Chair Car
- Seating arrangements: Airline style; Rotatable seats
- Sleeping arrangements: No
- Catering facilities: On board Catering
- Observation facilities: Large windows in all coaches
- Entertainment facilities: On-board WiFi; Infotainment System; Electric outlets; Reading light; Seat Pockets; Bottle Holder; Tray Table
- Baggage facilities: Overhead racks
- Other facilities: Kavach, Advanced heating systems

Technical
- Rolling stock: Specially-Designed Mini Vande Bharat 2.0
- Track gauge: Indian gauge 1,676 mm (5 ft 6 in) broad gauge
- Electrification: 25 kV 50 Hz AC Overhead line
- Operating speed: 58 km/h (36 mph) (Avg.)
- Average length: 480 metres (1,570 ft) (20 coaches)
- Track owner: Indian Railways
- Rake maintenance: (TBC)

The 26403/26404 Srinagar – Jammu Tawi Vande Bharat Express is India's 69th Vande Bharat Express train, which connects the Summer capital city of Srinagar and the Divine Vaishno Devi Temple in the Temple City of Katra with Winter capital city of Jammu in the Union Territory of Jammu and Kashmir, India.

This express train was inaugurated on June 6, 2025, by Prime Minister Narendra Modi from Katra between Srinagar and SMVD Katra in Jammu and Kashmir.

On 30 April 2026, The service has been extended to Jammu Tawi as its new terminating station.

== Overview ==
This specially designed train is currently operated by Indian Railways, connecting Srinagar, Banihal, SMVD Katra, MCTM Udhampur and Jammu Tawi. This service currently runs along the recently finalized 272-kilometer Udhampur-Srinagar-Baramulla rail corridor, a major initiative aimed at integrating the Kashmir Valley into the broader Indian rail system.

== Interesting Facts ==
- Traversing through remarkable feats of engineering, the special express train crosses the Chenab Rail Bridge, famed as the world's highest rail bridge, and pass through the Banihal Tunnel, both of which play a major role in improving the area's rail connectivity.
- This new rail service is poised to be a game-changer for the region, making visits to the Mata Vaishno Devi shrine in Katra more accessible, attracting more tourists, and spurring economic activity throughout the Kashmir Valley through better transportation links.

== Rakes ==
It is the sixty-fourth and the second specially designed 2nd Generation Vande Bharat 2.0 Express train which was designed and manufactured by the Integral Coach Factory at Perambur, Chennai under the Make in India Initiative.

The train has been upgraded to a 20-coach configuration. This indicates a permanent expansion from previous coach counts to accommodate higher passenger demands.

- To tackle extreme cold, this specially designed train is outfitted with advanced heating solutions tailored specifically for sub-zero weather environments.
- Equipped with defrosting heaters embedded in the driver's windshield, the train ensures unobstructed sightlines even in the harshest winter conditions.

== Service ==
The 26404/26403 Srinagar – Jammu Tawi Vande Bharat Express currently operates 6 days a week, covering a distance of 269 km (167 mi) in a travel time of 04 hrs 45 mins with average speed of 58 km/h. The Maximum Permissible Speed (MPS) will be confirmed after commercial run.

== See also ==
- Vande Bharat Express
- Gatiman Express
- Udhampur-Srinagar-Baramulla rail link
- Srinagar railway station
- Shri Mata Vaishno Devi Katra railway station
- Jammu Tawi railway station
