= Mumbai CSMT–Solapur Vande Bharat Express =

Vande Bharat Express train route in India

Mumbai CSMT – Solapur Vande Bharat Express

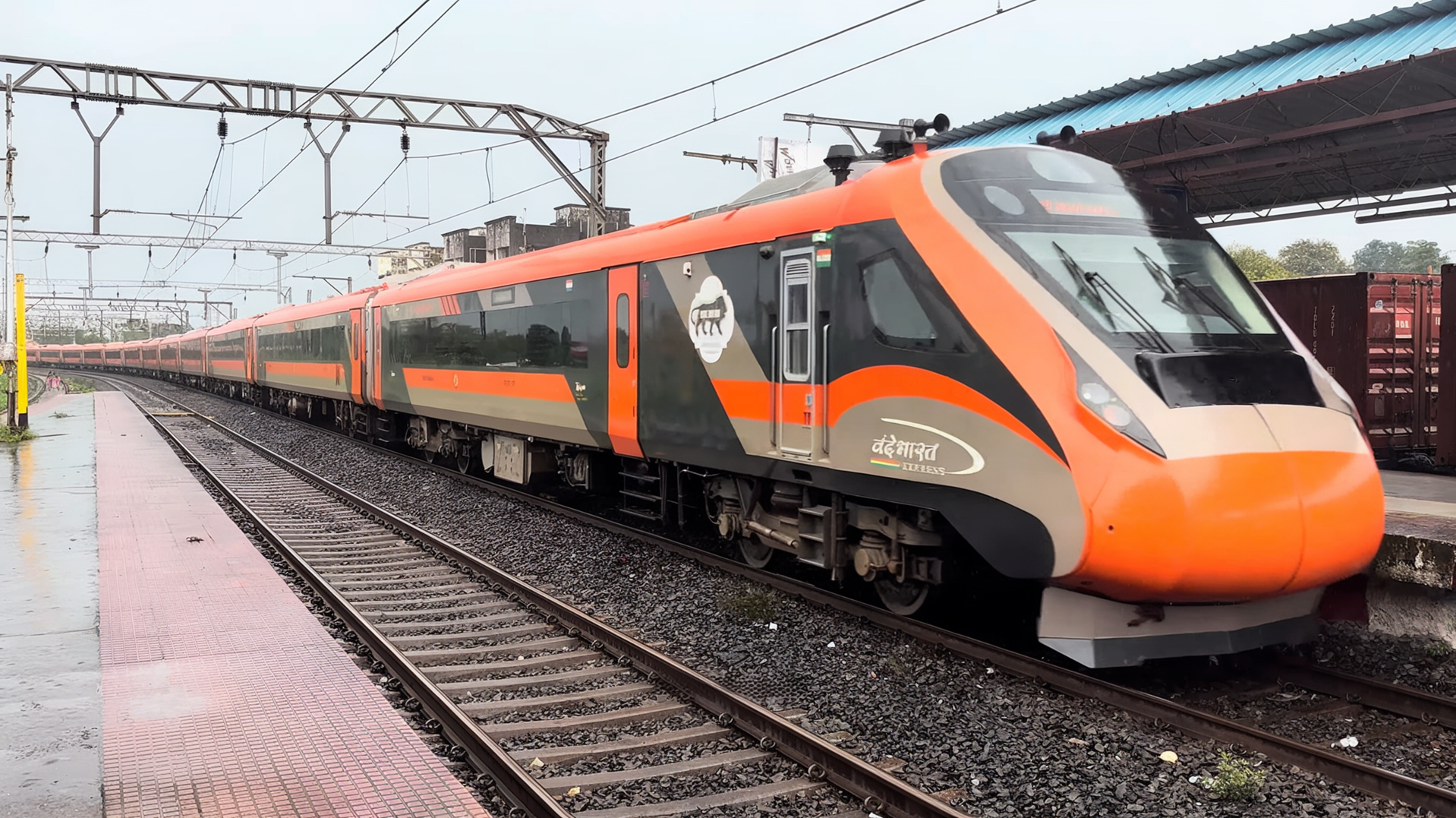

Overview
- Service type: Vande Bharat Express
- Locale: Maharashtra
- First service: 10 February 2023 (Inaugural run); 11 February 2023; 3 years ago (Commercial run)
- Current operator: Central Railways (CR)

Route
- Termini: Mumbai CSMT (CSMT); Solapur (SUR)
- Stops: 6
- Distance travelled: 452 km (281 mi)
- Average journey time: 06 hrs 30 mins
- Service frequency: Six days a week (Note: Except Wednesdays for 22225 and Thursdays for 22226)
- Train number: 22225 / 22226
- Line used: Mumbai Dadar–Solapur section

On-board services
- Classes: AC Chair Car, AC Executive Chair Car
- Seating arrangements: Airline style; Rotatable seats
- Sleeping arrangements: No
- Catering facilities: On-board catering
- Observation facilities: Large windows in all coaches
- Entertainment facilities: On-board WiFi; Infotainment System; Electric outlets; Reading light; Seat Pockets; Bottle Holder; Tray Table
- Baggage facilities: Overhead racks
- Other facilities: Kavach, Additional Parking brakes and Traction Motor System

Technical
- Rolling stock: Vande Bharat 2.0 (Last service: August 26, 2025); Vande Bharat 3.0 (First service: August 28, 2025)
- Track gauge: Indian gauge 1,676 mm (5 ft 6 in) broad gauge
- Electrification: 25 kV 50 Hz AC Overhead line
- Operating speed: 69 km/h (43 mph) to 70 km/h (43 mph) (Avg.)
- Average length: 480 metres (1,570 ft) (20 coaches)
- Track owner: Indian Railways
- Rake maintenance: Hazur Sahib Nanded (NED)
- Rake sharing: 20705 / 20706 Nanded - CSMT Vande Bharat Express

The 22225/22226 Mumbai CSMT–Solapur Vande Bharat Express is India's 9th Vande Bharat Express train, running across the state of Maharashtra by starting from Mumbai's Chhatrapati Shivaji Terminus and terminating at Solapur city.

== Overview ==
This train is operated by Indian Railways, connecting Mumbai CSMT, Dadar Ctrl, Thane, Kalyan Jn, Pune Jn, Daund Junction, Kurduwadi Jn, and Solapur. It is currently operated with train numbers 22225/22226 on 6 days a week basis.

=== Coach augmentation ===
As per latest updates, this express train will be augmented with 4 additional AC coaches, thereby running with Vande Bharat 3.0 trainset W.E.F. 28 August 2025 in order to enhance passenger capacity and make travel smoother and more convenient on this popular route.

== Rakes ==
It was the seventh 2nd Generation Vande Bharat Express train and was designed and manufactured by the Integral Coach Factory (ICF) under the leadership of Sudhanshu Mani at Perambur, Chennai under the Make in India initiative.

== Service ==
The 22225/22226 Mumbai CSM Trm - Solapur Vande Bharat Express operates six days a week except Wednesdays, covering a distance of 454 km (282 mi) in a travel time of 6 hours with an average speed of 69 km/h (43 mph). The service has 5 intermediate stops. The Maximum Permissible Speed is 130 km/h (81 mph).

Mumbai CSMT - Solapur Vande Bharat Express (22225)
Station	Station Code	Arrival	Departure	Halt (min)	Distance (km)	Day
Mumbai CSM Trm	CSMT	—N/a	16:05	—N/a	—N/a	1
Dadar Ctrl	DR	16:15	16:17	2	9.0	1
Thane	TNA	16:33	16:35	2	33.3	1
Kalyan Jn	KYN	16:51	16:53	2	53.5	1
Pune Jn	PUNE	19:10	19:15	5	191.6	1
Kurduwadi Jn	KWV	21:36	21:38	2	375.2	1
Solapur	SUR	22:40	—N/a	—N/a	454.0	1

Solapur - Mumbai CSMT Vande Bharat Express (22226)
Station	Station Code	Arrival	Departure	Halt (min)	Distance (km)	Day
Solapur	SUR	—N/a	06:05	—N/a	—N/a	1
Kurduwadi Jn	KWV	06:53	06:55	2	78.8	1
Pune Jn	PUNE	09:15	09:20	5	262.4	1
Khandala	KAD	10:17	10:18	1	329.9	1
Kalyan Jn	KYN	11:33	11:35	2	400.5	1
Thane	TNA	11:50	11:52	2	420.7	1
Dadar Ctrl	DR	12:12	12:14	2	445.0	1
Mumbai CSM Trm	CSMT	12:35	—N/a	—N/a	454.0	1

== Accidents ==
On 27 April 2026, one trolley of the fourth coach of the Mumbai-Solapur Vande Bharat Express derailed at a diamond crossing when entering Pune Junction railway station at around 7:30 PM. Although no injuries have been reported, this was the first time that a Vande Bharat Express had been derailed since its launch in 2019.

== See also ==
- Hazur Sahib Nanded–Mumbai CSMT Vande Bharat Express
- Vande Bharat Express
- Tejas Express
- Gatimaan Express
- Solapur railway station
- Mumbai CSMT Terminus
