= Shri Mata Vaishno Devi Katra railway station =

Railway station in Katra, India

Shri Mata Vaishno Devi Katra
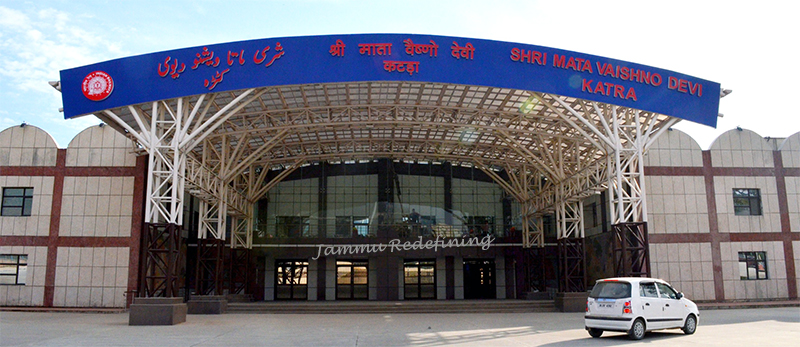
- SMVD Katra railway station

General information
- Location: Katra,Reasi district, Jammu and Kashmir; India
- Coordinates: 32°58′56″N 74°56′07″E
- Elevation: 813.707 m (2,670 ft)
- System: Major Express train and Passenger train station
- Owner: Indian Railways
- Operator: Northern Railways
- Lines: Jammu–Baramulla line, Amritsar–Shri Mata Vaishno Devi Katra railway line, Jalandhar–Shri Mata Vaishno Devi Katra railway line
- Platforms: 5

Construction
- Parking: Available
- Accessible: Disabled access

Other information
- Status: Active
- Station code: SVDK
- Zone(s): Northern Railway zone
- Division(s): Jammu

History
- Opened: 4 July 2014; 12 years ago
- Electrified: 25 KV

Services
Preceding station	Indian Railways	Following station
Chak Rakhwal towards Jammu Tawi	Northern Railway zone Jammu-Baramulla line	Reasi towards Baramulla
Route map
Location
- Location within India Location within Jammu and Kashmir

Shri Mata Vaishno Devi Katra railway station (station code: SVDK) is a railway station on the Jammu Udhampur Srinagar Baramulla Railway Link in Reasi district in the Indian Union Territory of Jammu and Kashmir. It mainly serves the town of Katra where the major Hindu Shri Mata Vaishno Devi temple is situated. The temple is visited by millions of travellers per month via this station and its frequent special trains connectivity from all over India. The station belongs to the newly created Jammu division of Northern Railway zone in Jammu and Kashmir.

== History ==
In 1898, Maharaja Prathap Singh first explored to connect Jammu with Srinagar. But due to non-co ordination and other reasons, it stopped.

In April 2005, the Jammu Udhampur Srinagar Baramulla Railway Link was completed up to Udhampur railway station from Jammu side and up to Banihal railway station from Srinagar side. Pirpanjal railway tunnel was completed and testing was being conducted in 2012. The rail link was inaugurated by Prime Minister Narendra Modi on 4 July 2014 at 10:00 A.M. Katra was the northern terminus of the southern section of the Jammu–Baramulla line as well as the northernmost place accessible on the contiguous network of Indian Railways

On 6 June 2025, a pair of Vande Bharat trains between Katra and Srinagar were inaugurated, finally connecting the Kashmir Valley with the rest of India.

A 1 megawatt solar power plant was commissioned at the station in March 2015.

== Passenger amenities and facilities ==
The ground floor of Katra railway station has escalators, lifts, current reservation, second class booking, train enquiry section, pilgrim guide, tourist assistance, VIP lounge, a fully air-conditioned hotel with a shopping lounge, multi-cuisine restaurant, cloak room, waiting hall, a book stall, tea stall, toilet blocks, and catering area. The first floor accommodates eight retiring rooms and a cafeteria. A huge parking place has also been constructed to accommodate cars and passenger buses.

Being a modern railway station. Katra Railway station is equipped with modern facilities.

== See also ==
- Banihal railway station
- Jammu–Baramulla line
- Northern Railways
- List of railway stations in Jammu and Kashmir
