= Jammu Tawi railway station =

Railway station in Jammu, India

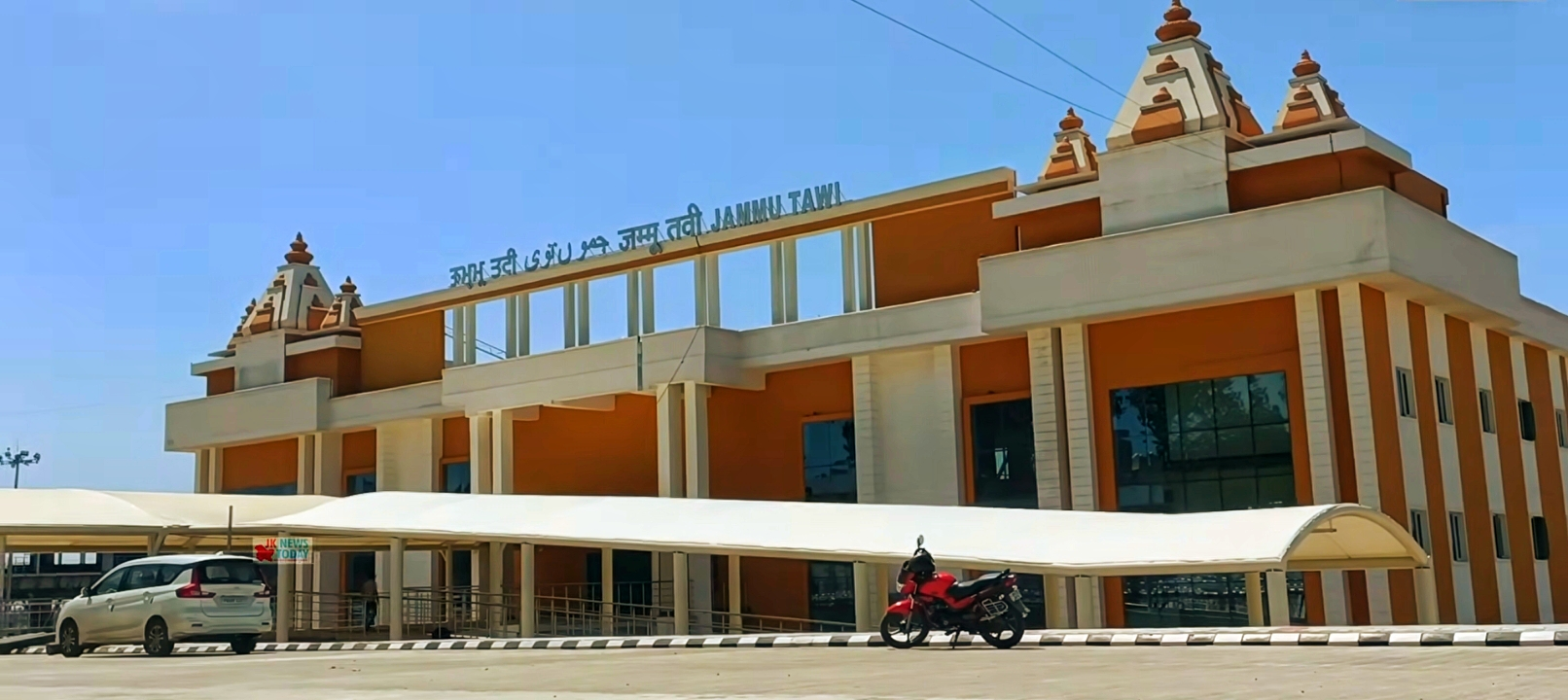
- New building of Jammu Tawi railway station

General information
- Location: Railway Road, Jammu, Jammu & Kashmir, India
- Coordinates: 32.7063°N 74.8802°E
- Elevation: 343.763 metres (1,127.83 ft)
- System: Regional rail and Light rail station
- Owner: Ministry of Railways (India)
- Operator: Indian Railways
- Lines: Jalandhar–Shri Mata Vaishno Devi Katra railway line, Amritsar–Shri Mata Vaishno Devi Katra railway line, Jammu–Baramulla line
- Platforms: 7
- Tracks: 7

Construction
- Structure type: At grade
- Parking: Yes
- Accessible: Yes

Other information
- Status: Functioning
- Station code: JAT
- Zone(s): Northern Railway
- Division(s): Jammu

History
- Opened: 1975; 51 years ago
Location
- Location within Jammu and Kashmir Location within India

Jammu Tawi railway station (station code JAT) is the largest and most important railhead in Jammu and Kashmir, serving as the primary gateway for tourists visiting the Jammu Region, Kashmir Valley and pilgrims heading to Shri Mata Vaishno Devi Katra Jammu.

This station is part of Northern Railway Zone's Jammu Division and the Jammu–Baramulla line via Shri Mata Vaishno Devi Katra - Srinagar.

It is also part of the Jalandhar–Jammu line and Amritsar–Jammu main line.

This station is a category (NSG 2) in Northern Railway.

== Overview ==
Jammu Tawi Railway station is a high-revenue station, serving over 40,000 passengers and over 50 Mail/ Express and almost 10 Passenger train on daily basis. It is under the administrative control of the Northern Railway zone's Jammu railway division.

Jammu Tawi is well connected with many important cultural cities such as Delhi, Mumbai, Kolkata, Chennai, Chandigarh, Jaipur, Ahmedabad, Pune, Bhopal, Lucknow, Varanasi, Jaunpur, Kanpur, Patna, Guwahati, Jamshedpur, Kanniyakumari, Tiruchirappalli, Jodhpur, Tirupati, Vijayawada, Coimbatore, Kochi, Thiruvananthapuram, Madurai, Warangal, Secunderabad, Indore, Nagpur, Pathankot, Jalandhar, Ludhiana, Amritsar, Mathura, Agra, Gwalior, Jhansi, Kota, Ambala, Raipur, Haridwar, Gaya, Prayagraj, Rourkela, Kathgodham, Jabalpur etc.

The third longest running train in India, in terms of time and distance, the Himsagar Express that goes to Kanyakumari, Tamil Nadu in 70 hours, used to originate from here. Now it originates from Shri Mata Vaishno Devi Katra railway station. Most premium express train of India, Vande Bharat Express, makes a stop here.

== History ==
The Pre-Partition Era (1890–1947)

The first railway line in Jammu and Kashmir was the Jammu–Sialkot Line, which became operational in 1890 under the rule of Maharaja Pratap Singh.

- The Original Station: The terminus was located at Bikram Chowk (also known as the Old Jammu Station), built around 1897.
- Connectivity: It was a 43 km broad-gauge branch that linked Jammu to Sialkot Junction (now in Pakistan), providing a vital trade route for sugar and passengers.
- Abandonment: Following the Partition of India in 1947, the link to Sialkot was permanently severed. The station and tracks fell into disuse, and Jammu remained without any rail services for over two decades.

The Re-emergence (1970–1975)

After the 1965 Indo-Pakistan war highlighted the strategic need for troop mobilization, the Indian Railways prioritised a new line.

- Pathankot–Jammu Link: Work began in 1969 to extend the line from Kathua to Jammu.
- Opening of Jammu Tawi: The current Jammu Tawi (JAT) station was inaugurated on October 2, 1972, for goods traffic and on December 2, 1972, for passenger traffic. The first train to arrive was the Delhi-Jammu Tawi Srinagar Express (later renamed the Jhelum Express after extension to Pune on Delhi end by 1979).

Modern Milestones & Future

- Electrification: The station and the Jalandhar–Jammu section were fully electrified in 2014–15.
- Heritage Restoration: In 2021, the government launched a project to restore the ruins of the Old Bikram Chowk Station as a heritage site to preserve its 120-year-old history.
- Expansion (2025–2026): Jammu Tawi is currently undergoing a ₹500 crore redevelopment to increase capacity and facilitate the new direct rail link to the Kashmir Valley via the USBRL project, which officially operationalized through service to Srinagar by April 2026.

== Key modernization projects ==
Jammu Tawi railway station (JAT) is currently completing a ₹500 crore transformation under the Amrit Bharat Station Scheme, turning it into a future-ready transit hub as it begins serving the new direct rail link to Srinagar.

Operational Expansion (Yard Remodeling)

The most critical modernization was the yard remodeling, completed in early 2025, which laid the foundation for current operations:

- Platform Expansion: The station has been upgraded from 3 platforms to 7 platforms.
- Ballastless Tracks: New platforms use ballastless track technology with washable aprons to ensure higher hygiene and faster turnarounds.
- Increased Stabling: Washing pit lines were increased from 3 to 5, allowing the station to handle and maintain significantly more originating trains.

World-Class Passenger Infrastructure

The redevelopment focuses on providing an "airport-like" experience:

- Air Concourse: A massive 72-metre wide air concourse now connects all seven platforms, facilitating seamless passenger movement without platform congestion.
- Second Entry (Narwal Side): A new 4,500 sqm entry building has been constructed on the Narwal side to provide a second access point and decongest the main entrance.
- Main Building Upgrade: The original station building is being expanded into a 15,600 sqm facility equipped with modern waiting halls, executive lounges, and advanced passenger information systems.
- Vertical Mobility: The project includes the installation of several new lifts and escalators, alongside two new 12-metre wide foot-over bridges.

Strategic Digital & Safety Upgrades

- Electronic Interlocking: Outdated mechanical systems have been replaced with advanced electronic interlocking to manage the increased traffic of 100+ daily trains more safely.
- Connectivity: The entire complex is now a 5G-enabled zone with free high-speed Wi-Fi and centralized CCTV monitoring for enhanced security.

Direct Kashmir Connectivity (The USBRL Impact) As of April 30, 2026, Jammu Tawi officially serves as the starting point for the Jammu–Srinagar Vande Bharat Express. This 20-coach train uses specialized winterisation technology to handle sub-zero Himalayan conditions, a first for the Indian rail network.

== Electrification ==
The Jalandhar–Jammu section, Jammu Tawi station and sidings have been completely energized to 25 kV AC and approved for electric traction in August 2014. Swaraj Express now gets an end to end WAP-7 Ghaziabad Shed from Jammu Tawi to Bandra Terminus. Himgiri Express now gets an end to end WAP-7 Howrah Shed from Jammu Tawi to Howrah.

== See also ==
- Jammu–Baramulla line
- Northern Railways
- Srinagar railway station
- List of railway stations in Jammu and Kashmir
- Future rail lines in J&K and Ladakh
- Jammu Tawi–Srinagar Vande Bharat Express

== Gallery ==
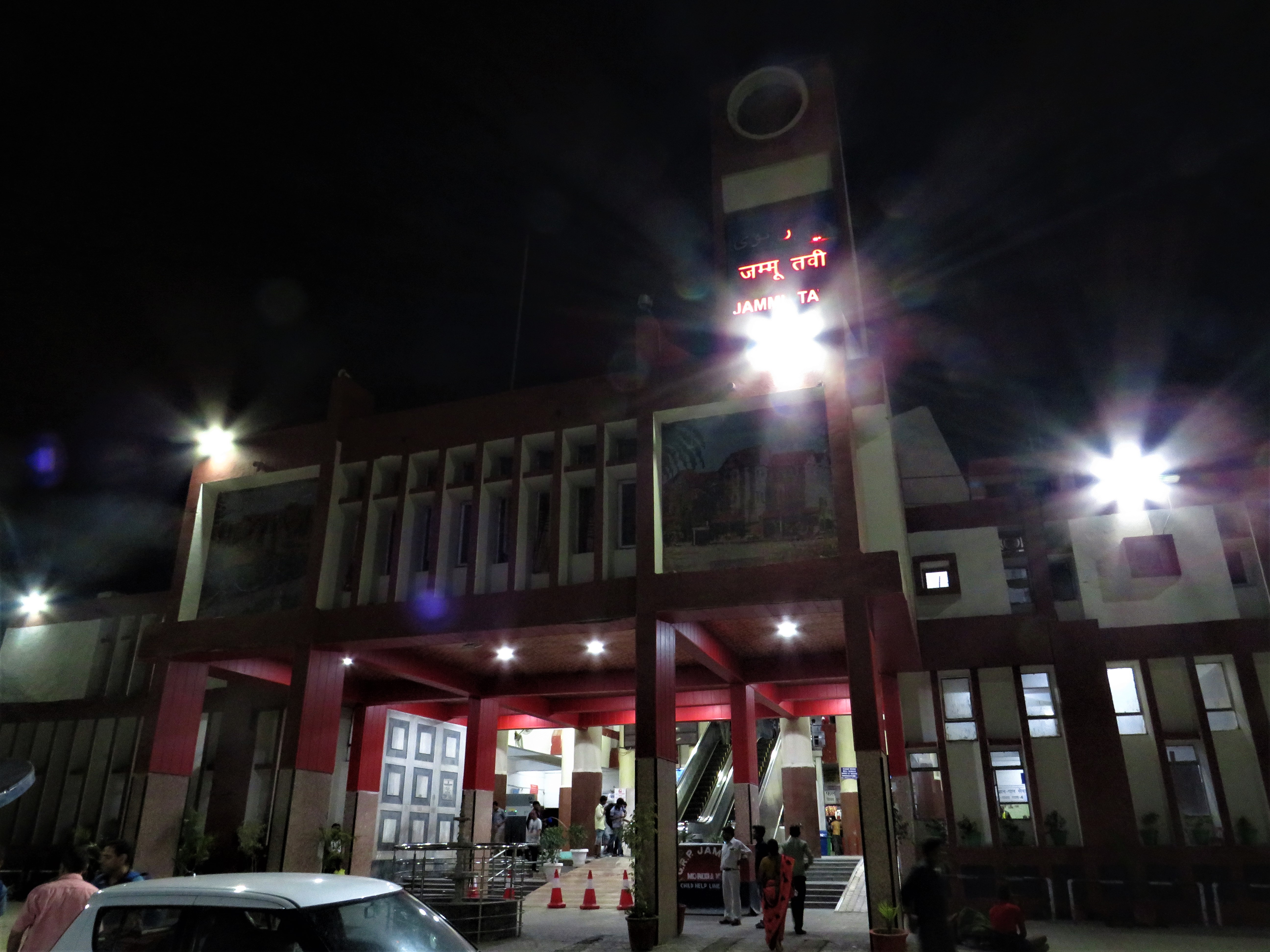

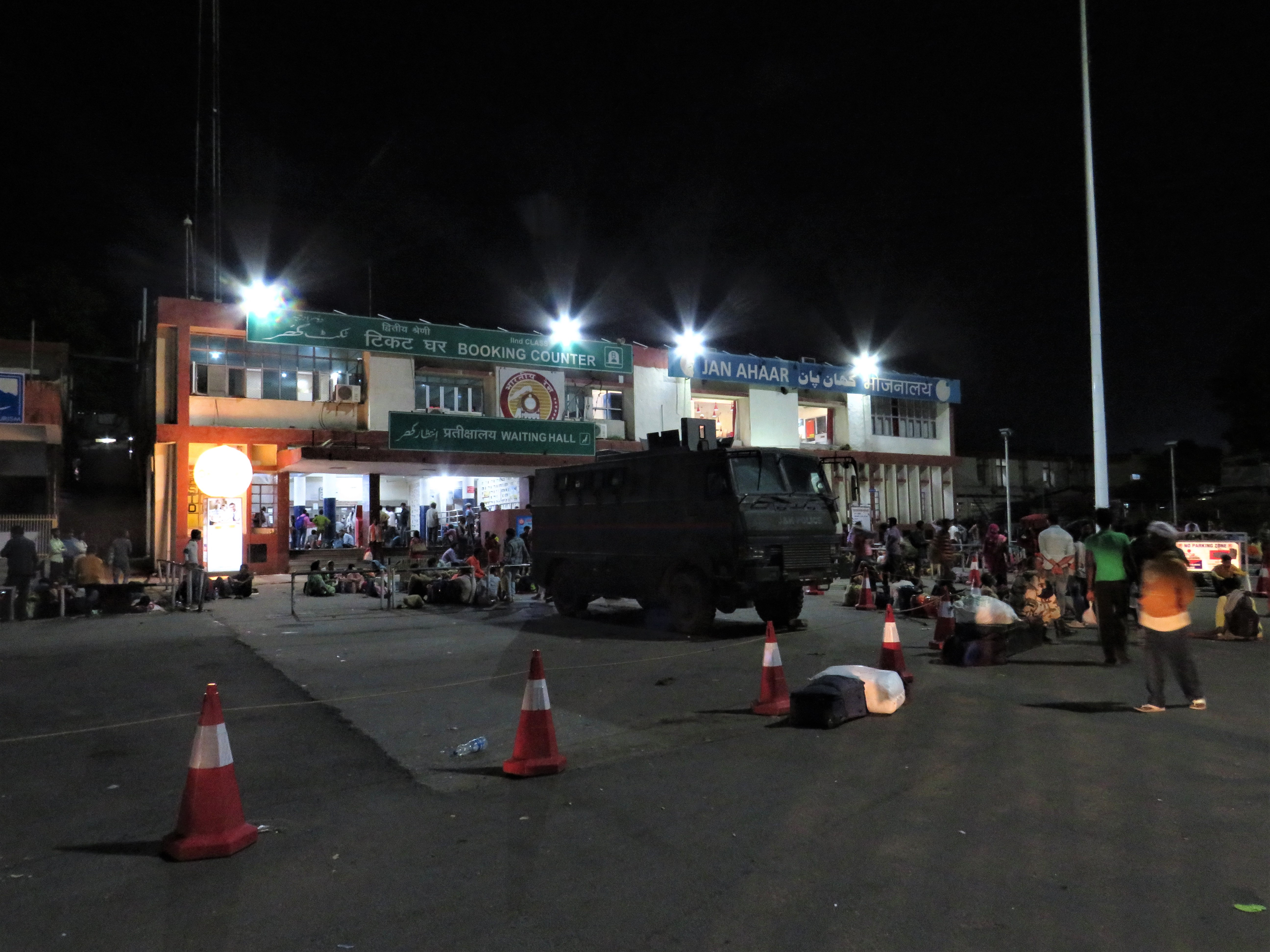

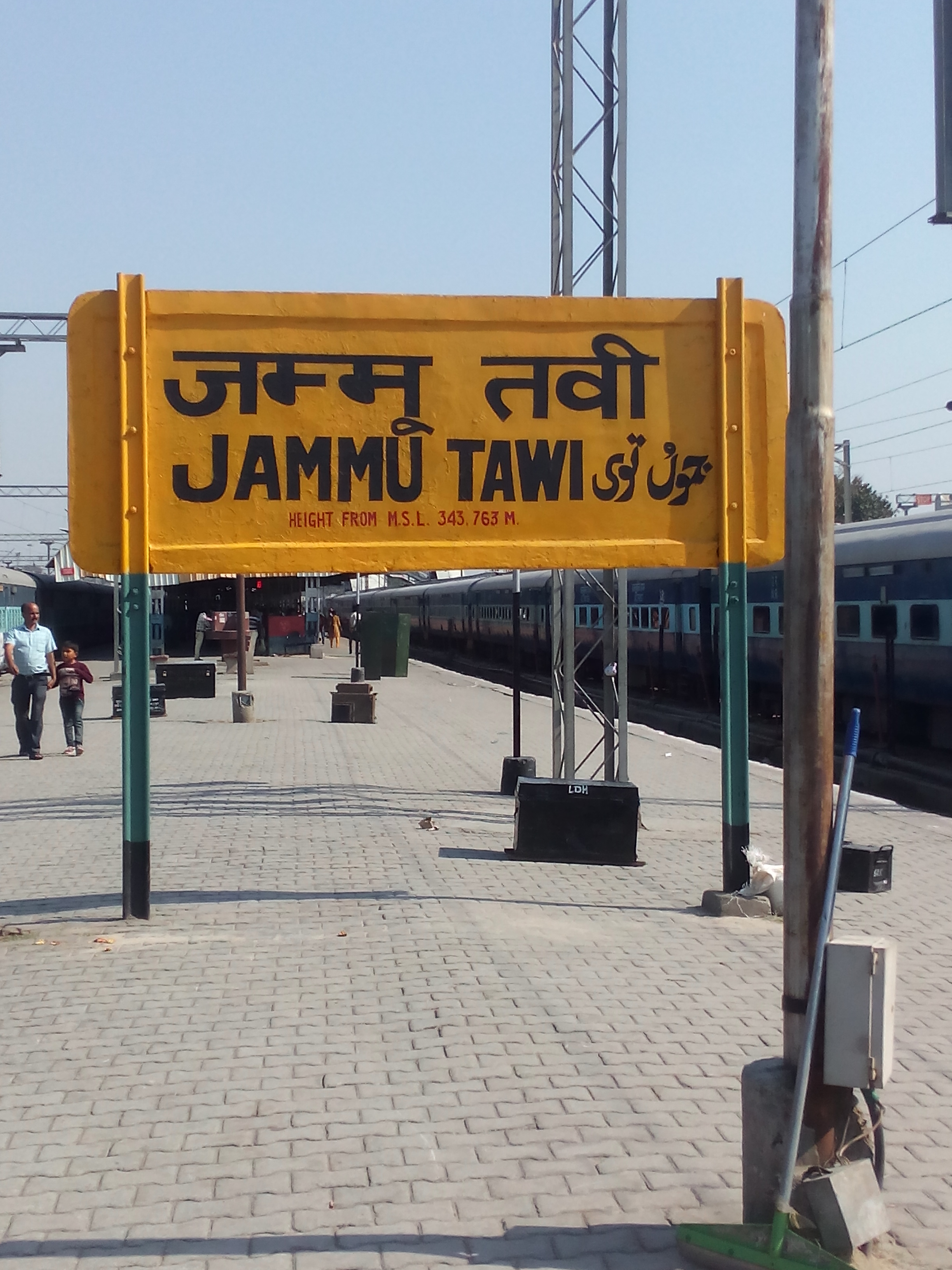

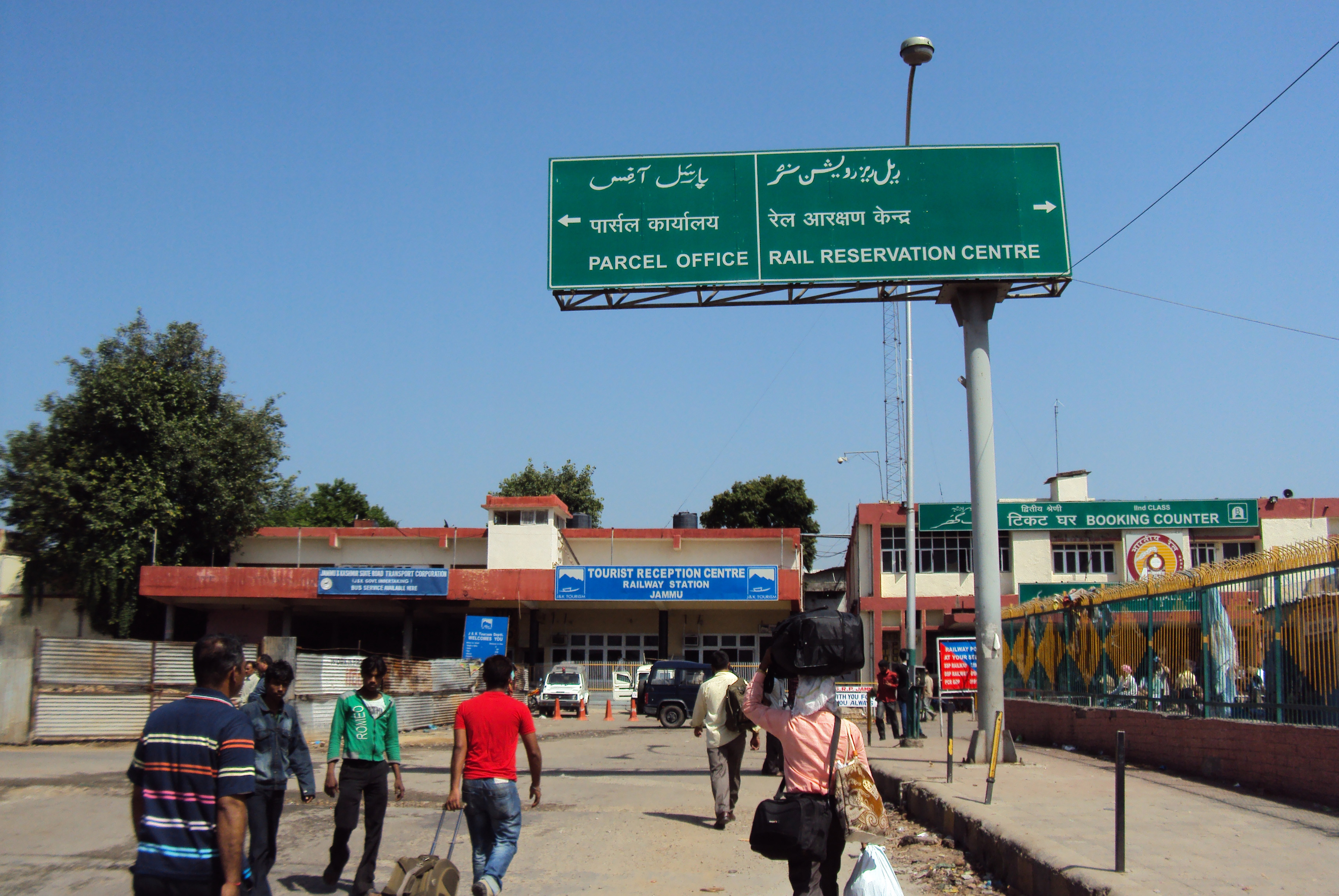
