= Vande Bharat (trainset) =

Indian semi-high-speed EMU trainsets

Vande Bharat transl. Train 18
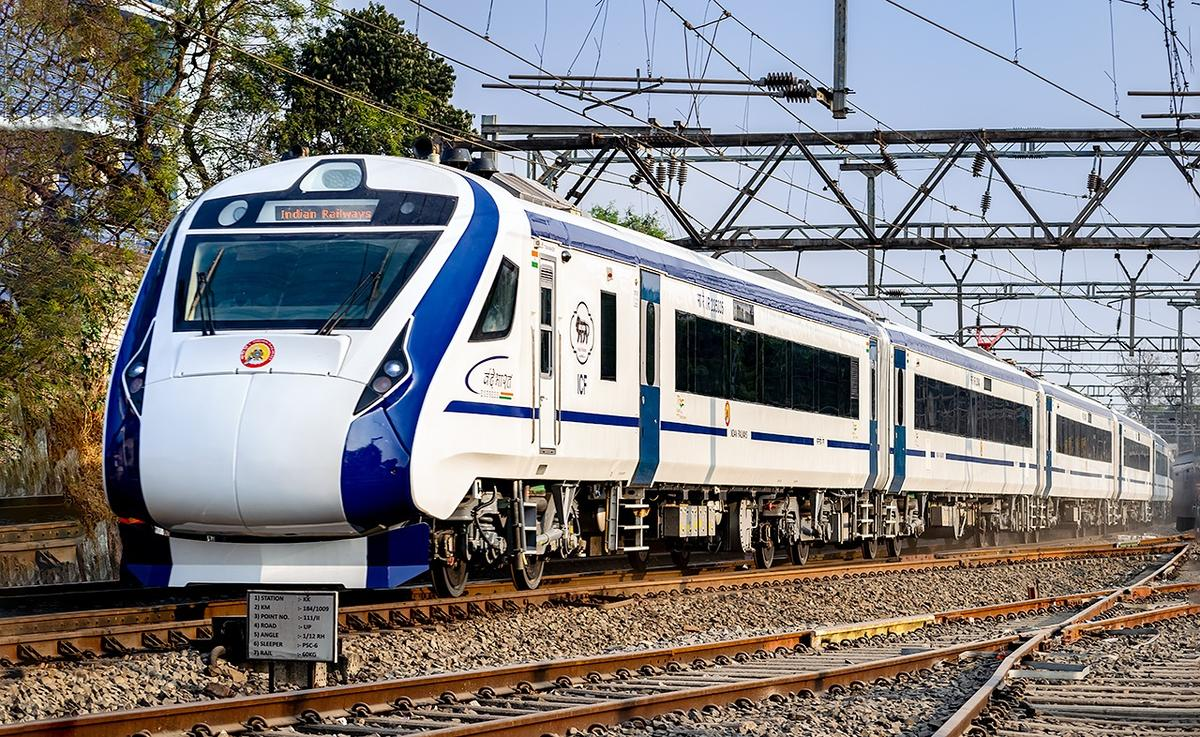
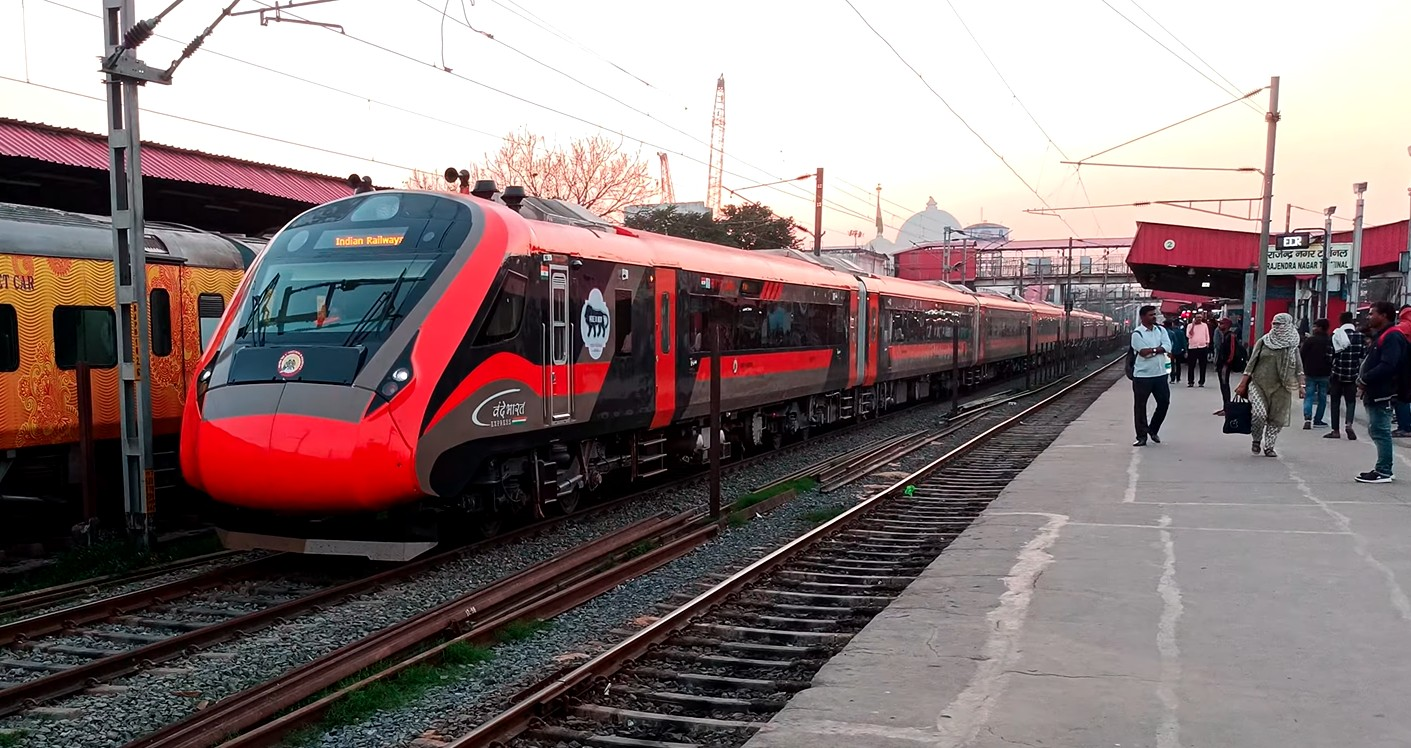

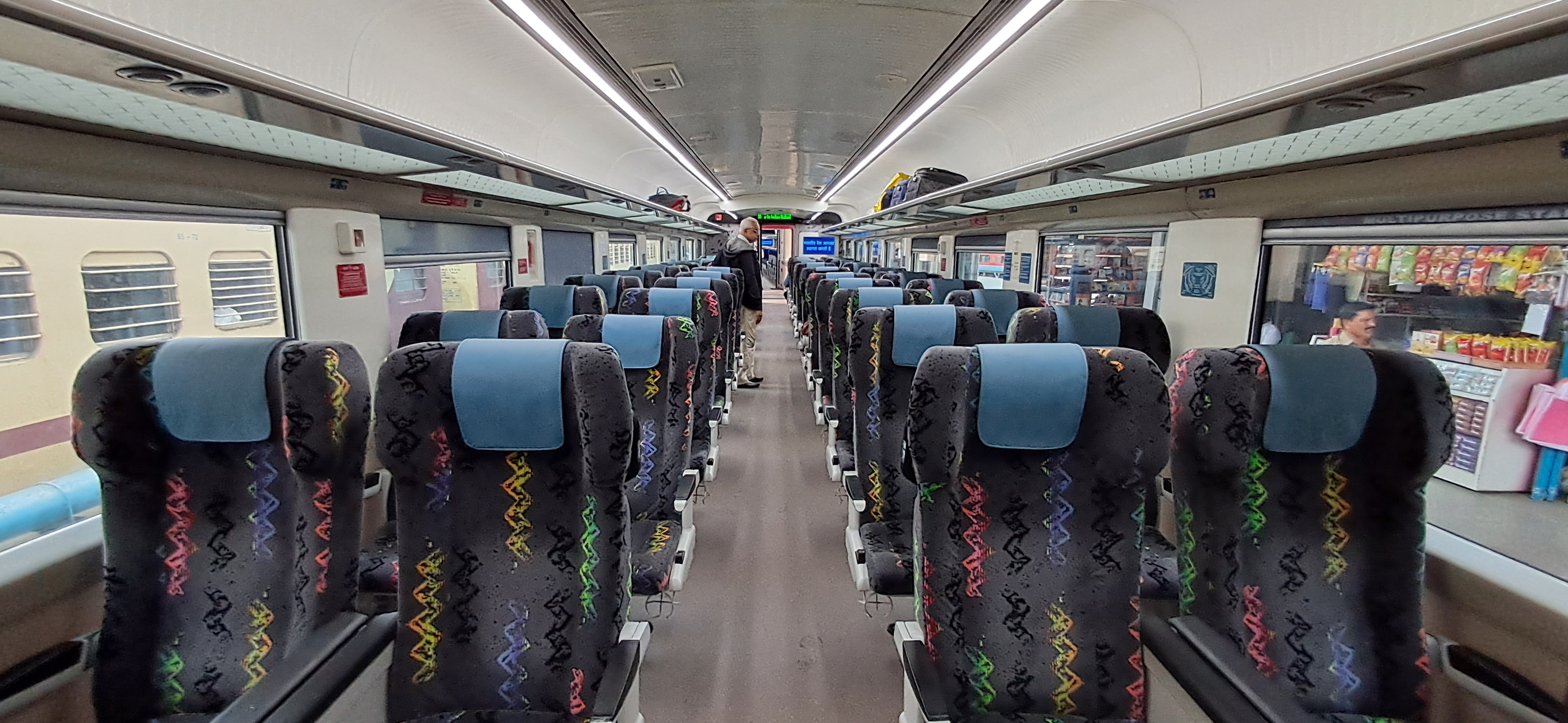
- Stock type: Electric multiple unit
- In service: 2019–present
- Manufacturer: Integral Coach Factory Modern Coach Factory
- Designer: RDSO
- Assembly: Chennai
- Built at: Integral Coach Factory
- Constructed: 2017−present
- Entered service: 15 February 2019
- Number built: Total: 95: First generation; 16-car: 2; Second generation; 8-car: 52; 16-car: 20; 20-car: 25
- Formation: 8 cars (2 power units); 16 cars (4 power units); 20 cars (5 power units)
- Capacity: 530 (8-car); 1,128 (16-car); 1,440 (20-car)
- Owner: Indian Railways
- Operator: Indian Railways
- Line served: 80

Specifications
- Car body construction: Light-weight stainless steel
- Train length: 384 m (1,260 ft) (16-car)
- Car length: 24 m (79 ft)
- Width: 3,240 mm (10.63 ft)
- Height: 4,140 mm (13.58 ft)
- Entry: Platform level
- Doors: Automatic doors
- Wheel diameter: 0.952 m (3 ft 1.5 in)
- Wheelbase: Bogie centres
- Maximum speed: 183 km/h (114 mph); 160 km/h (99 mph) (operational)
- Axle load: 17,000 kg (37,000 lb)
- Steep gradient: 1:37
- Traction system: 2x25 kV
- Traction motors: TSA-Medha Servo Drives TME 49-30-4
- Power output: 210 kW (280 hp) (single motor); 1,680 kW (2,250 hp) (4-car power unit); 3,360 kW (4,510 hp) (8-car); 6,720 kW (9,010 hp) (16-car); 8,400 kW (11,300 hp) (20-car)
- Tractive effort: 26.6 kN (6,000 lb_{f}) (single motor); 212.8 kN (47,800 lb_{f}) (4-car power unit); 425.6 kN (95,700 lb_{f}) (8-car); 851.2 kN (191,400 lb_{f}) (16-car); 1,064 kN (239,000 lb_{f}) (20-car)
- Transmission: TSA-Medha Servo Drives GKD 1-52-372A
- Acceleration: 0.7 m/s^{2} (2.3 ft/s^{2})
- Deceleration: 0.8 m/s^{2} (2.6 ft/s^{2})
- Electric system: 25 kV 50 Hz AC via overhead line
- Current collection: Pantograph
- Wheels driven: 16 (4-car power unit); 32 (8-car); 64 (16-car); 40 (20-car)
- Minimum turning radius: 145.83 m (478.4 ft)
- Braking system: Electro-pneumatic
- Safety systems: Electrical fire safety; Fire alarm; Disaster management lights; Train event recorder; HVAC; Voice communication and passenger information system; Centralized coach monitoring system
- Coupling system: Tightlock (AAR-E/H)
- Headlight type: LED
- Seating: Longitudinal (Chairs)
- Track gauge: 1,676 mm (5 ft 6 in)

The Vande Bharat trainset, also known as Train 18, is an Indian electric multiple unit designed for Vande Bharat train services of the Indian Railways. It was designed and developed by the state-owned Integral Coach Factory in Chennai.

The trainsets consist of eight, sixteen or twenty air-conditioned chair car coaches. Introduced in 2018, the trainsets achieved speeds of up to 183 km/h (114 mph) during trial runs, and has a maximum operational speed of 160 km/h (99 mph) in regular service.

== History ==
=== Dawn of EMUs ===
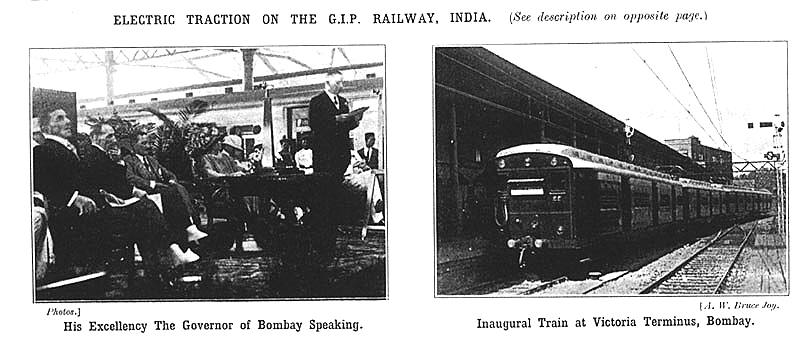
Inaugural EMU train at Victoria Terminus, Bombay, on the erstwhile GIP, now Central Railway zone

The first electric multiple unit (EMU) technology in India was introduced in Mumbai as a suburban railway service on 03-February-1925. With an increase in demand post-independence, India began to import EMUs from Europe and Japan, before it could manufacture indigenously. In the 1960s, BHEL, an Indian public sector giant started manufacturing electrical equipment for indigenous EMUs, which then started entering service in the same decade. During the same time, Integral Coach Factory of Chennai, a government-owned manufacturer of rail coaches started developing EMUs indigenously. This is regarded as a major leap in the Indian railway industry as they became the earliest precursors to Vande Bharat technology.

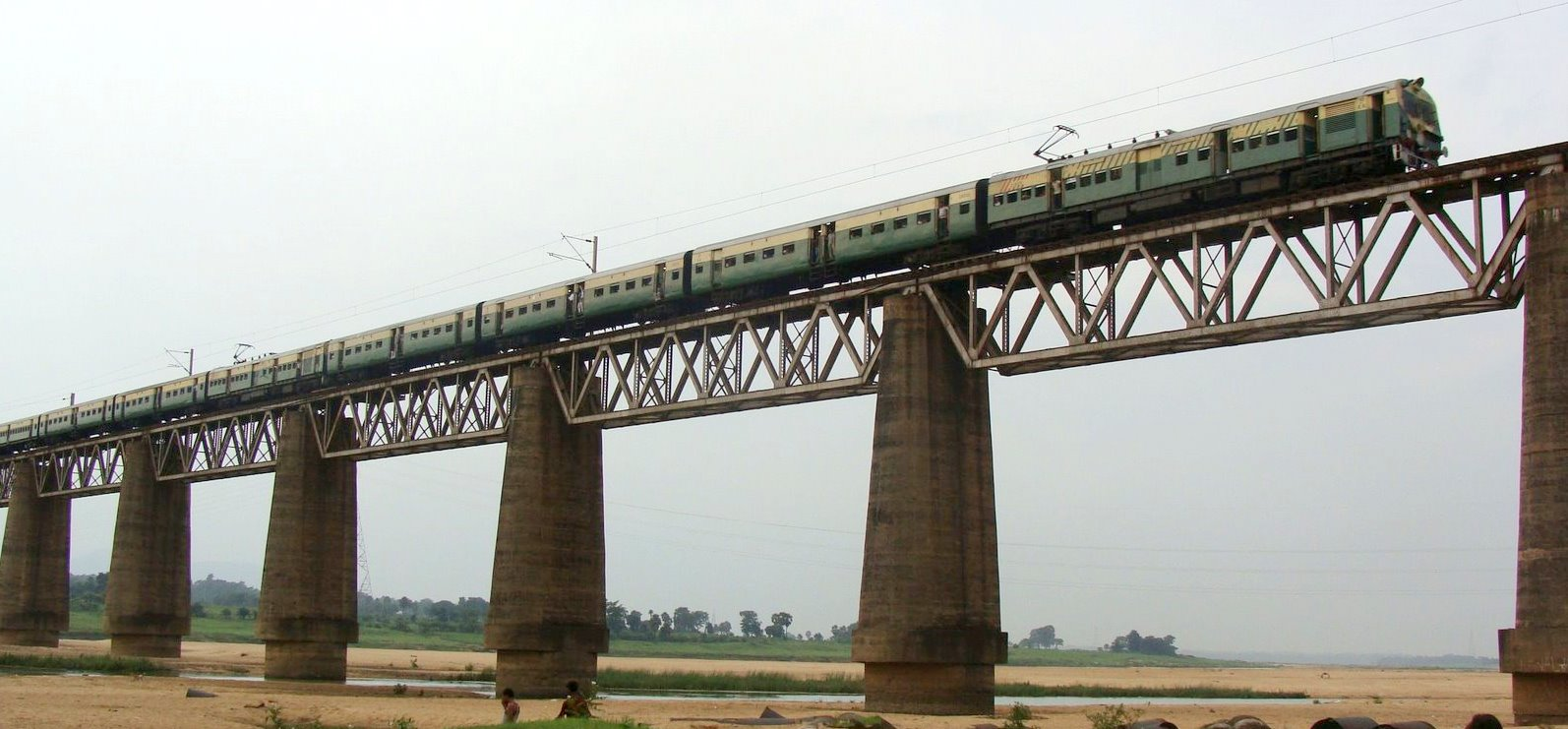
Adra – Asansol MEMU, the first MEMU service in India which began operation in 1995

By the 1990s, Indian Railways had a large number of EMU trainsets within the cities of Chennai, Delhi, Kolkata and Mumbai on their suburban railways. For regular long-distance travel, India continued relying on locomotives. The inefficiency of these locomotive-hauled trains was soon felt while the developed world already had well-built EMU high-speed technology by the 1990s. EMUs for longer distances were conceived on the long-distance main lines, which led to the development of mainline electric multiple units (MEMU). With the advantages of faster acceleration-deceleration, presence of driver cabins at both ends, being energy efficient with regenerative braking, encouraged Indian Railways to develop MEMUs for distances beyond the suburban belt. A decade later, India had several MEMUs operating across the country's electrified routes as a short-distance inter-city service. However, India still had to rely on locomotives for medium and long-distance travel.

=== Need for Speed and Comfort ===
For most of Indian Railways' history, speed and comfort were not of primary concern as safety was of utmost importance. While India saw 325 accidents in 2003–04, this number was down to 106 in 2015–16. The replacement of old ICF coaches by the modern and safer LHB coaches also helped the cause significantly. During the same period, Indian Railways had introduced Gatimaan and Tejas services that enhanced comfort with their modern LHB coaches. As the next step, Indian Railways at ICF headed by general manager Sudhanshu Mani, started designing a new EMU trainset that was set to be developed at half the imported cost. Since these trains were planned to be ready by 2018, they were named "Train-2018" and later "Train 18". They were designed to be fully air-conditioned and equipped with automatic doors, onboard Wi-Fi, and infotainment and many other modern facilities. It would mark the beginning of a new era in the Indian Railways where modern EMUs for long distances beyond suburban railways started plying. Train 18 was designed with the LHB coach as a base. With sixteen chair cars and a 160 km/h speed, the technology was set to replace Shatabdi services.

=== Prototype and Related Issues ===
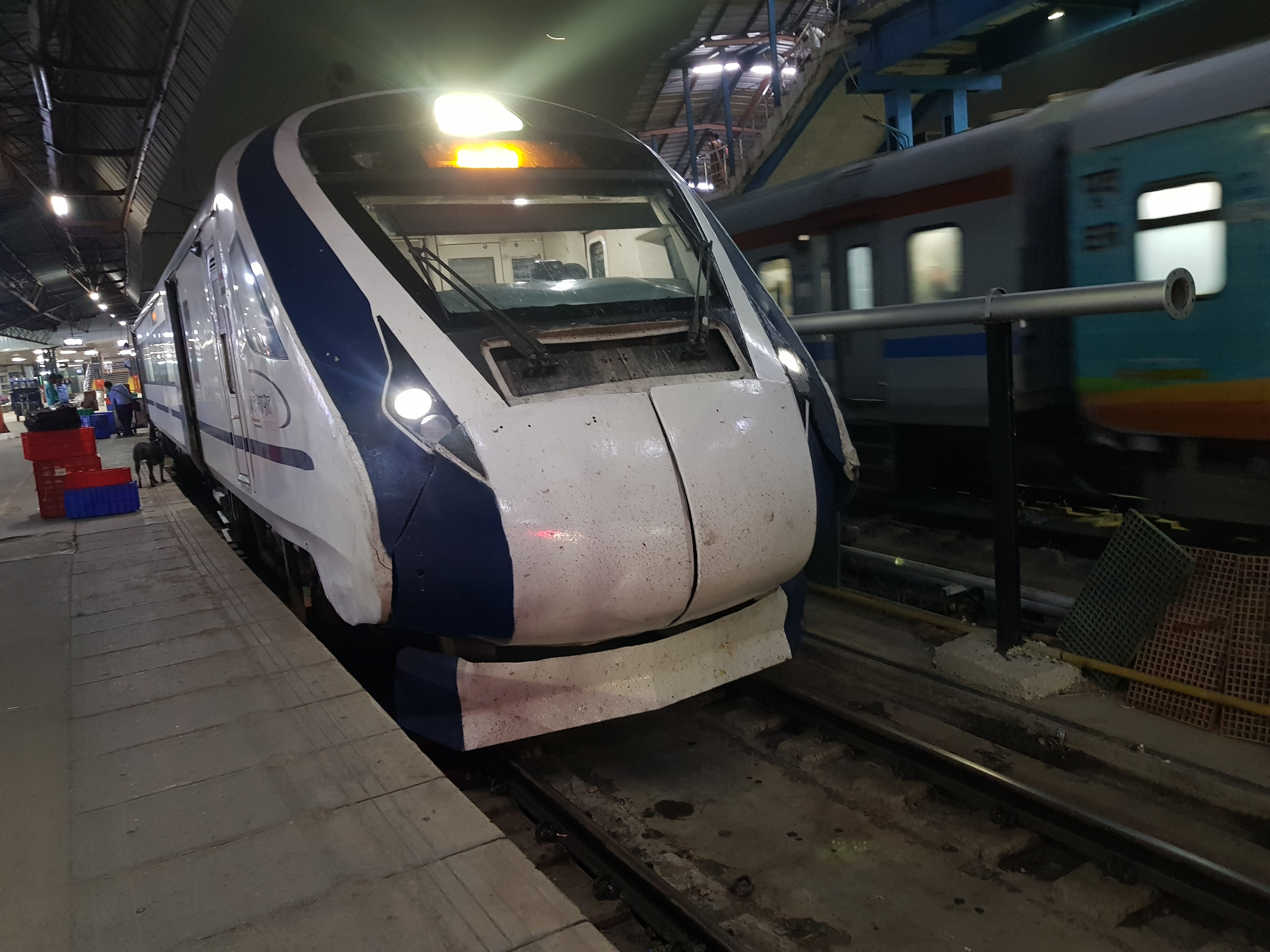
First generation Vande Bharat on platform 16 in New Delhi

The manufacturing of Train 18 was coincidentally completed 18 months after initiation. It was built at a cost of ₹970 million (equivalent to ₹1.4 billion or US$15 million in 2026) and had 80% indigenous components. During its trial runs, Train 18 became the fastest EMU train in India after attaining a speed of 180 km/h, during its test run at the Kota-Sawai Madhopur section. This speed was 4 km/h shy of India's overall best record of 184 km/h achieved by a WAP-5 Class locomotive back in 1997. Train 18 was renamed as 'Vande Bharat Express' as an acknowledgement for the fact that it was completely built in India by Indian engineers.

On 15-February-2019, the first Vande Bharat Express between New Delhi and Varanasi was flagged off at the New Delhi railway station by Prime Minister Narendra Modi. The train ran from New Delhi to Varanasi via Kanpur and Prayagraj, connecting Uttar Pradesh's Varanasi to the capital city and reduced the existing travel time along the route by 15%. The 8-hour journey from New Delhi to Varanasi station covered a total distance of 762 km (473 mi) between the two cities. However, while returning from Varanasi, the train broke down due to a cattle runover. According to reports, four cars of the train experienced an electrical outage and brakes were reported to be jammed as the train was halted for over an hour at Tundla Junction railway station before resumption.

The fleet of Vande Bharat trainsets was set to expand in numbers but Indian Railways had stopped the production of new sets owing to internal issues. After the intervention of the Railway Minister, Railways decided to resume tenders for the production of new sets. However, they wished to provide more time so that the manufacturers could come up with the cheapest bid and because the train would require a major upgrade from scratch, as per one railway official.

=== Second generation trainsets ===
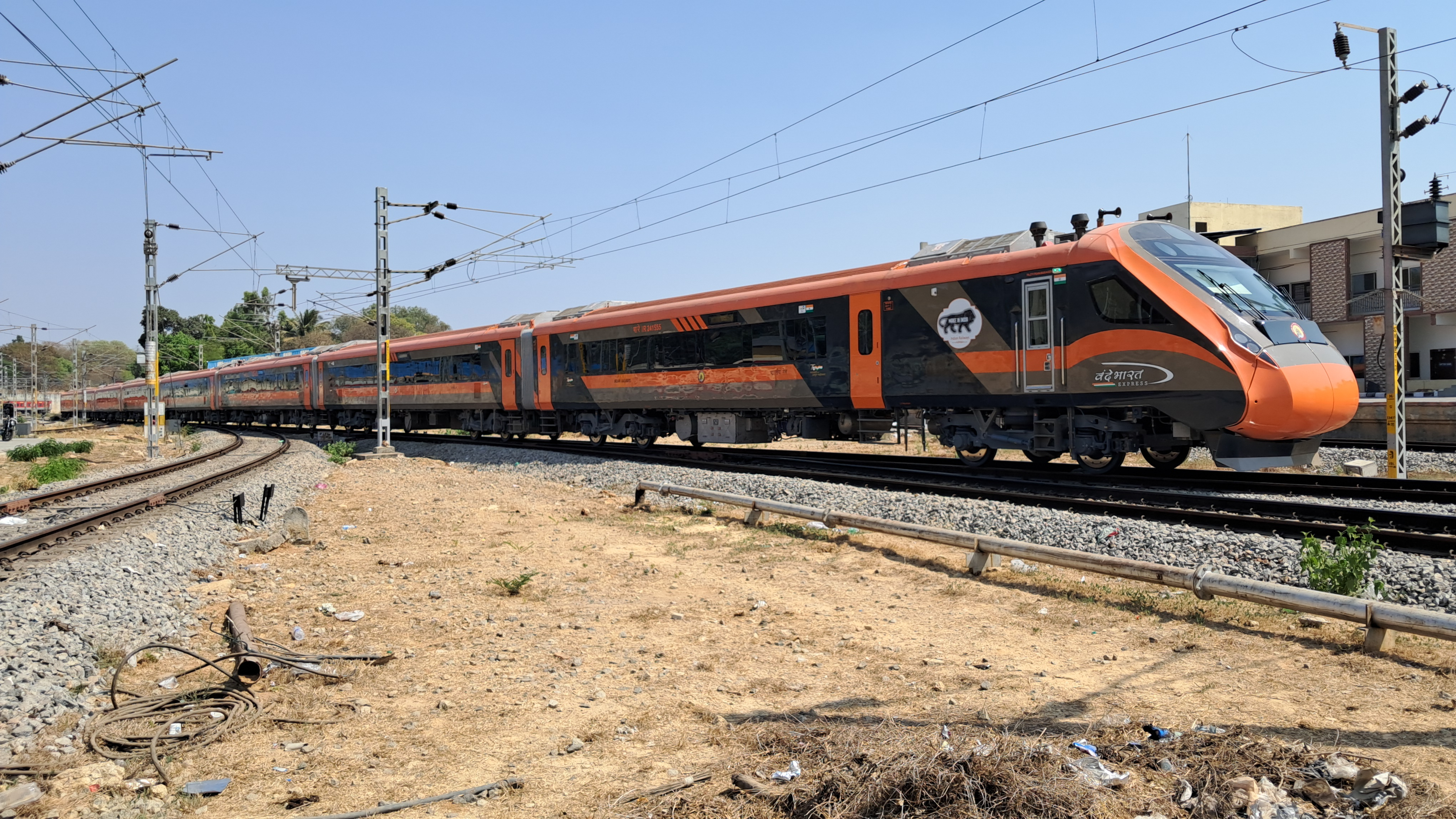
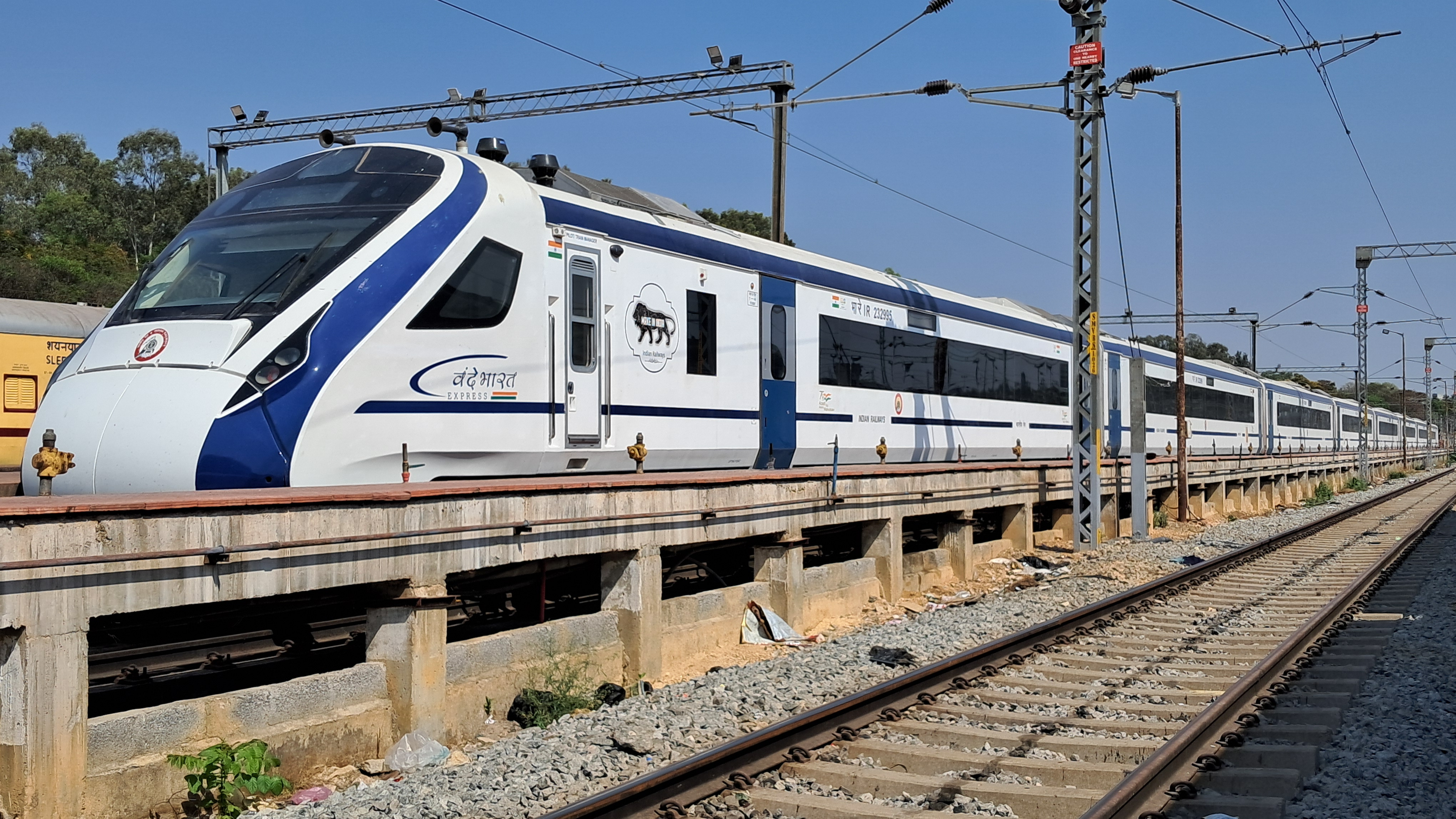
Liveries of the Second-Generation Vande Bharat Express trains

In January-2021, Indian Railways awarded a ₹22.11 billion (equivalent to ₹27 billion or US$290 million in 2026) contract to Hyderabad-based Medha Servo Drives to manufacture 44 second generation Vande Bharat trainsets, in accordance with the Atmanirbhar Bharat initiative that required 75% of the components to be locally sourced. In March-2022, Indian Railways awarded contracts to seven companies to manufacture 58 additional trainsets at a total cost of ₹18.5 billion (equivalent to ₹21 billion or US$230 million in 2026). The seven companies were Medha Servo Drives, Alstom, Siemens, Bharat Heavy Electricals Limited (BHEL), Titagarh Wagons, Saini Electricals and CGL. During manufacturing, the supply of wheels from Ukraine was disrupted due to the Russian invasion of Ukraine, delaying production. Indian Railways later sought Steel Authority of India (SAIL) and Rashtriya Ispat Nigam (RINL) to manufacture the wheels. On 09-September-2022, trial runs for the second version of Vande Bharat Express were completed, during which it broke the acceleration record as it accelerated from 0–100 km/h (0–62 mph) in just 52 seconds, making it two seconds faster than Japanese bullet trains in acceleration. It entered service on 30 September 2022.

In early 2023, an allocation was made for Vande Bharat services with a reduced car configuration, for lower demand, known as Mini Vande Bharat Express. It was projected to cost about ₹650 million (US$6.9 million) per rake for an 8-car configuration, at a cost of ₹81.25 million (US$870,000) per car. Indian Railways was targeting for manufacturing 1,000 Mini Vande Bharat rakes of 8-car configuration. During the financial year of 2023–24, an allocation of ₹1 million (US$11,000) had been made for designing the concept and preliminary research.

In July-2023, Indian Railways announced a new saffron and grey livery for Vande Bharat trains inspired by the Indian tricolour. The Union Minister of Railways, Ashwini Vaishnaw, said that 25 improvements have been incorporated into the trains, including anti-climbing devices. These anti-climbing devices will also be added to trains other than Vande Bharat.

In August-2024, trial runs of 20-car Vande Bharat were conducted on the Mumbai–Ahmedabad route.

== Engineering ==
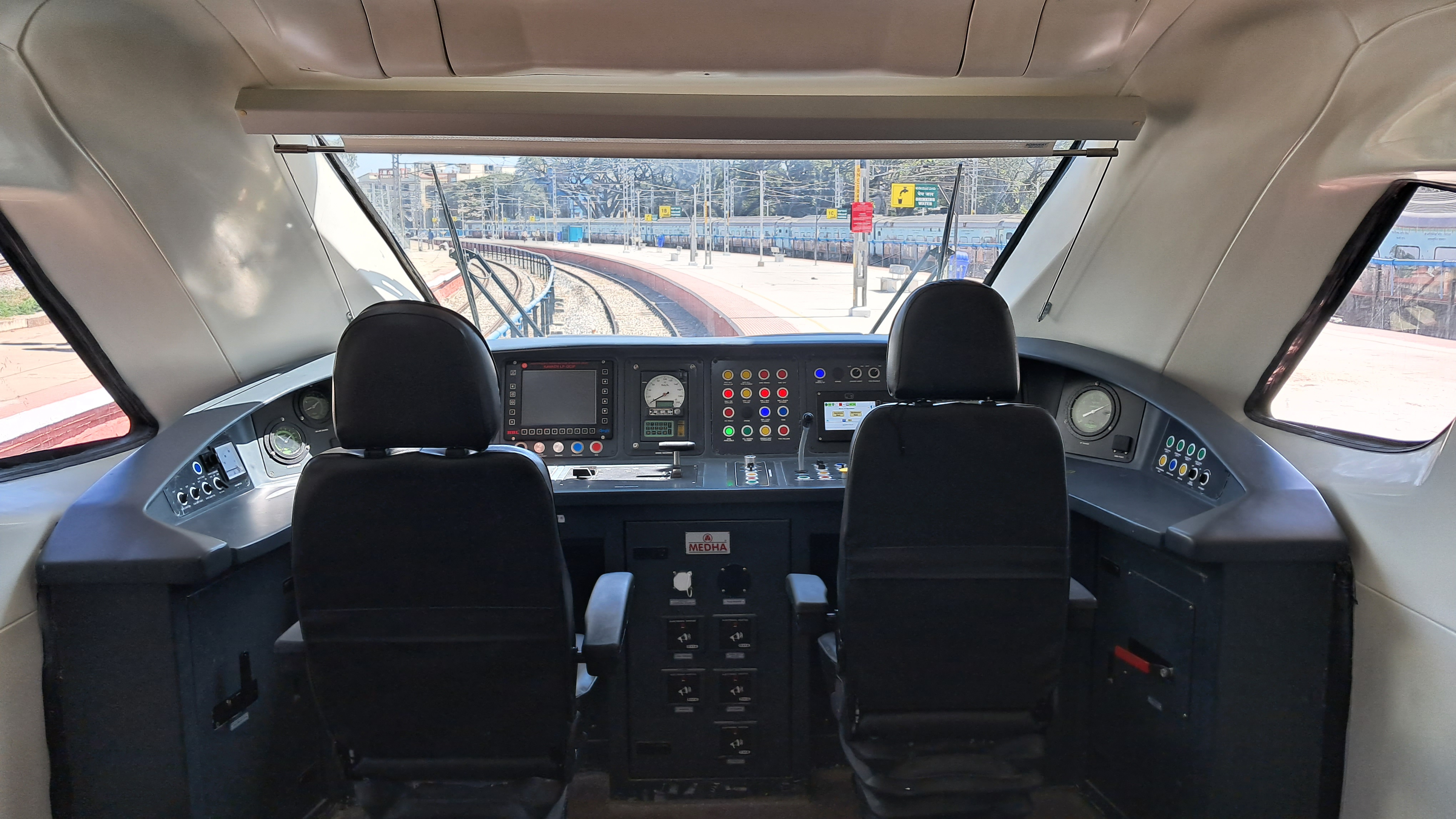
Cabin View of Vande Bharat Express trains

As part of the "Make in India" initiative, the Integral Coach Factory (ICF) created and produced the Vande Bharat Express. There are two generations of the train with design upgrades and addition of new features with subsequent generations.

=== First Generation ===
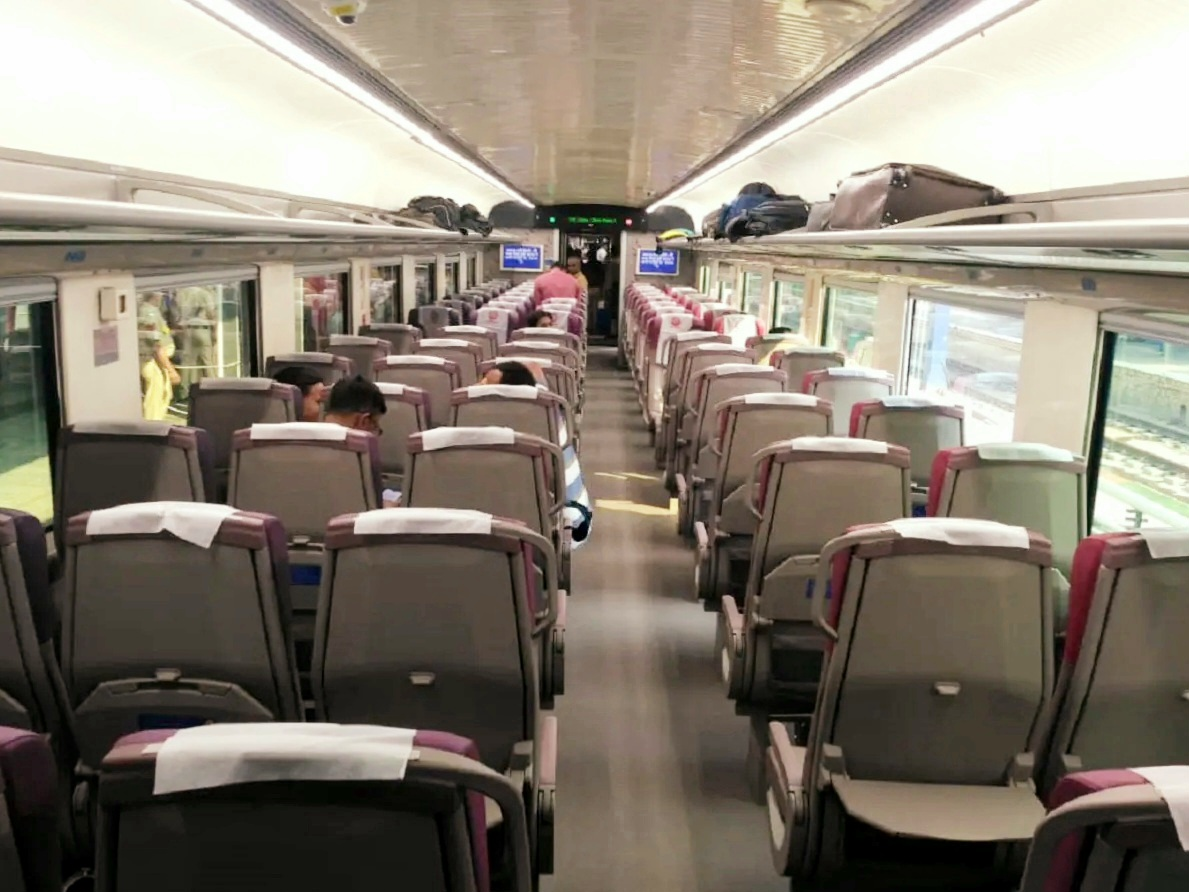
First generation Vande Bharat Chair Car (CC) seating

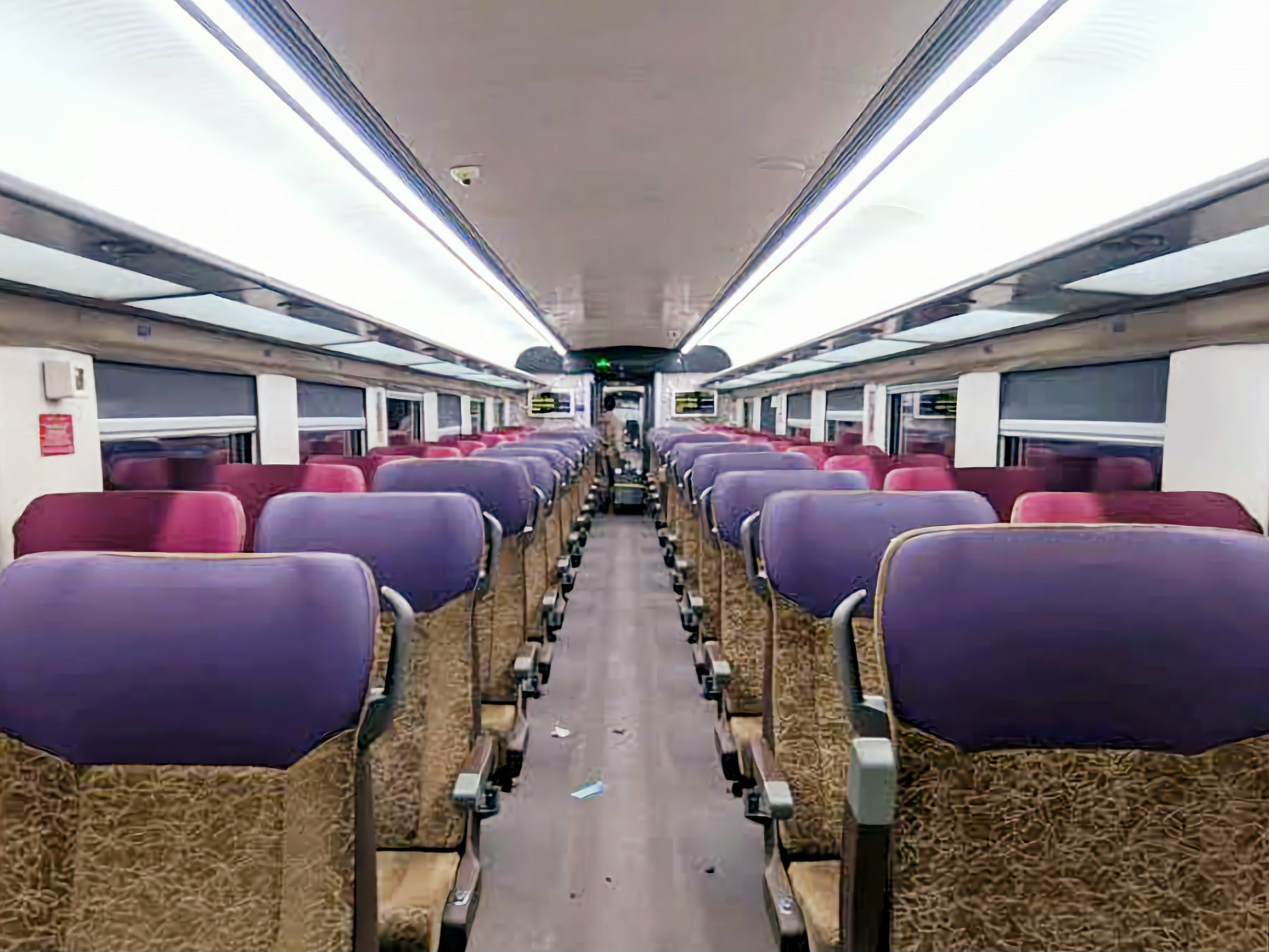
First generation Vande Bharat Executive Chair Car (EC) seating

The exterior of the first version of Vande Bharat Express had an aerodynamic design that helped to reduce air resistance at high speeds. It had a driver's cabin at each end, that enables immediate switch in train's direction, unlike a locomotive-hauled train. The 16-car trainset weighs 430 tonnes (420 long tons; 470 short tons) and has a seating capacity of 1,128 passengers. Two of the centre compartments are first-class compartments that seat 52 each, with the rest being chair car compartments seating 78 each. The chassis of a coach is 23 metres (75 ft) long, and the frame of the train is made entirely of stainless steel. Alternate coaches are motorised to ensure an even distribution of power and quicker acceleration and deceleration. The cars are interconnected and fully sealed to allow better mobility between coaches and reduce noise. The train features a GPS-based passenger information system, bio-vacuum toilets, and rotational seats that can be aligned in the direction of travel in the executive class, and employs a regenerative braking system.

This version reached a maximum speed of 180 km/h (110 mph). It could accelerate to a speed of 100 km/h (62 mph) in 54.6 seconds and reach its maximum speed in 145 seconds. Trains were equipped with 24-inch (61 cm) television screens that serve as the passenger information and entertainment system. The train's underframe electrical equipment can withstand floods up to 400 mm (16 in). Among the imported components were the wheels, seats, doors, braking system, transformers, and electronic parts such as processing chips.

=== Second Generation ===
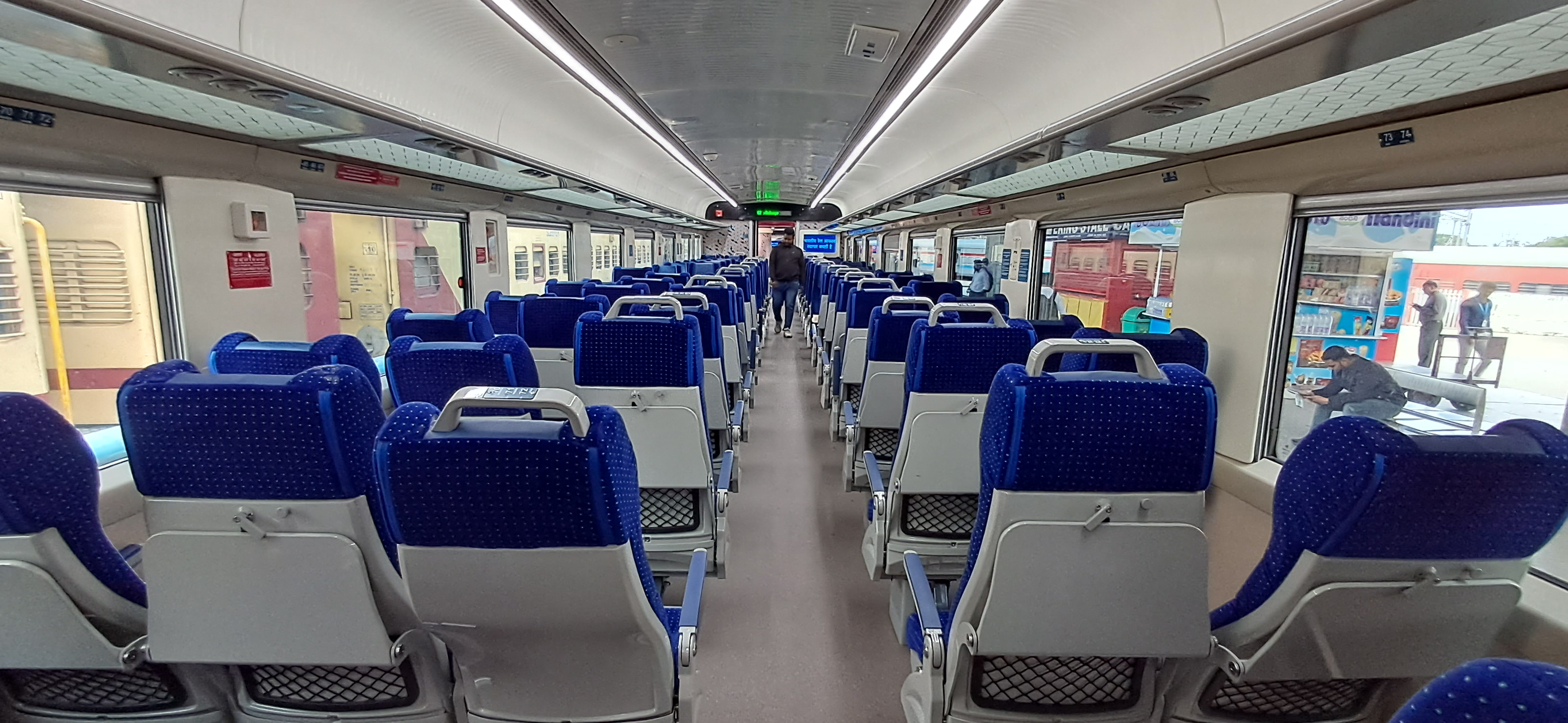
Second generation Vande Bharat's Chair Car (CC) seating

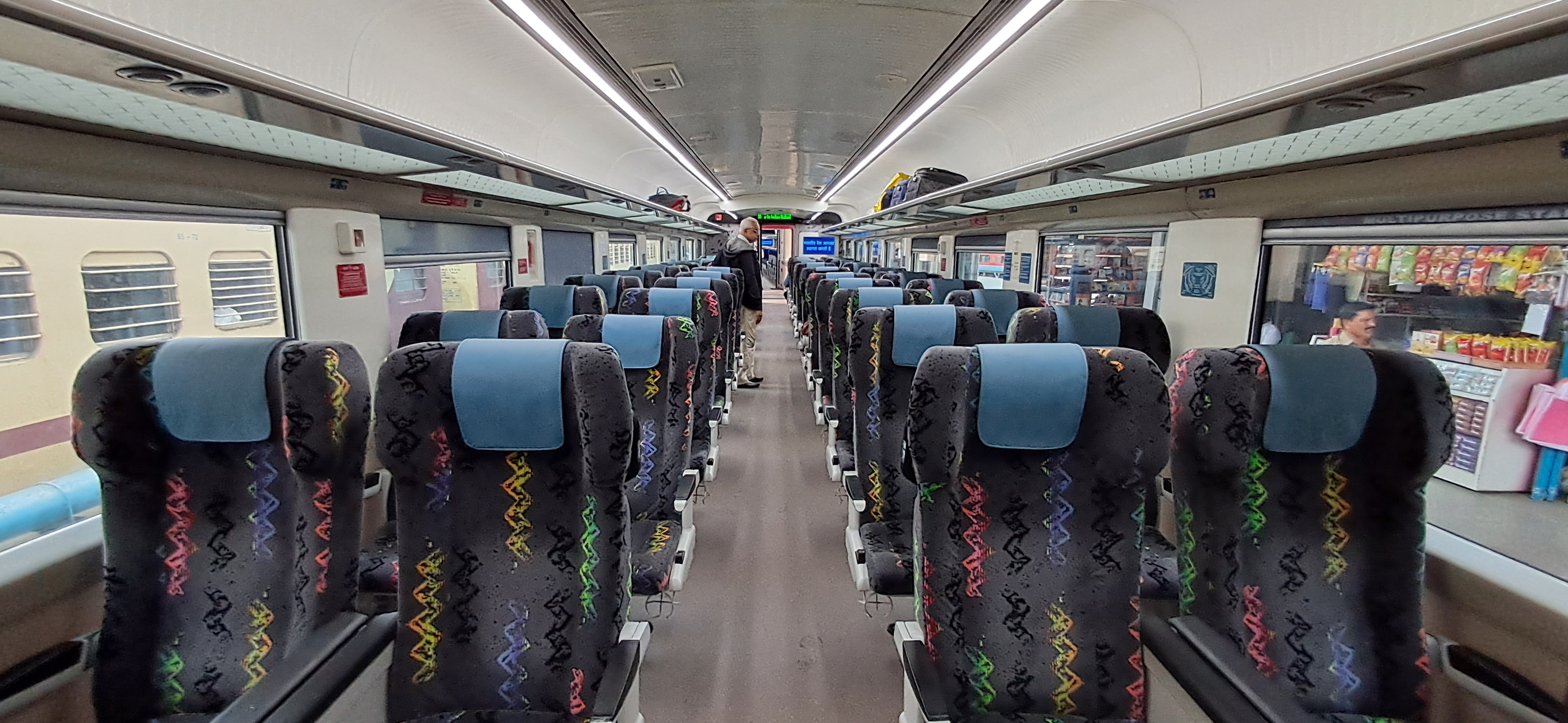
Second generation Vande Bharat's Executive Chair Car (EC) seating

The second generation trains were built in 2022 and they could accelerate to a speed of 100 km/h (62 mph) in a record time of 52 seconds, compared to the 54 seconds taken by the older version. The train could reach a speed of 160 km/h (99 mph) in 140 seconds, 5 seconds faster than the first generation of the train. It is lighter, weighing 392 tonnes (386 long tons; 432 short tons) compared to 430 tonnes (420 long tons; 470 short tons) of the previous version, and is equipped with larger 32-inch (81 cm) television screens and Wi-Fi on board. The air conditioning system on the VB2 utilises 15% less energy than the system on the first Vande Bharat trainset. VB2 also has automatic plug doors, sliding doors that don't need to be touched, emergency communication units, accessible toilets, a bigger driver's cabin, and seats in all coaches that can be leaned back. To address the seat reclining issues of the previous version, the new chairs were equipped with a push-back arrangement for smooth reclining.

This version is additionally equipped for safety and protection with Kavach signalling technology. The train offers enhanced amenities, security, and surveillance systems, as well as features suited for emergencies. The seats are made up of fibre-reinforced polymer (FRP) and were made by Tata Steel's Composites division. The new rolling stock features four emergency windows, disaster lights in all coaches in the event of lighting system failure, fire survival cables within door circuits, ventilation for three hours in the event that the air conditioner loses power, and four additional emergency push buttons per coach. The new coaches are also equipped with a centralised coach-monitoring system for all types of electricity and climate control, among other new additions. An official added that the new coaches would be provided with a bacteria-free air conditioning system and higher flood protection for electrical equipment to ensure reliability during monsoons up to 650 mm (26 in).

On 24-September-2023, 9 new Vande Bharat Express trains were flagged off which include upgraded features for passenger comfort after feedback. These include improvements to seats, improvements to toilets and an improved aerosol-based fire detection and suppression system.

==== Modified Rakes ====
Several rakes have been modified to accommodate specific routes. The Mumbai CSMT–Sainagar Shirdi Vande Bharat Express and Mumbai CSMT–Solapur Vande Bharat Express are modified Vande Bharat trains that have additional parking brakes for stopping the train on a slope because they traverse sections of mountain passes. This feature is not available in other Vande Bharat trains.

The Ajmer–Delhi Cantt. Vande Bharat express is a modified Vande Bharat train that has high-rise pantographs as the New Delhi–Jaipur route has a higher catenary for accommodating double-stacked containers and Double Decker Express trains. It is the world's first semi-high-speed passenger train with high-rise pantographs.

Srinagar–Katra Vande Bharat Express has specially designed heated coaches tailored specifically for sub-zero weather environments. It's also equipped with defrosting heaters embedded in the driver’s windshield, the train ensures unobstructed sight-lines even in the harshest winter conditions.

The upcoming KSR Bengaluru-Mangaluru Vande Bharat express will also feature a specially modified rake, with the highlight being a redesigned AEB (Automatic Emergency Braking) system; which was done keeping the ghat section between Subramanya Road-Sakleshpur in mind, as this contains many steep curves, gradients and descents which a normal Vande Bharat rake would not be able to traverse through. This was done to alleviate the use of banking locomotives, thereby reducing travel times by around 20 mins in each direction. Trials for the train are scheduled in August, with the rake currently handed over to the Mysuru Division of the South Western Railways.

=== Rake Formation ===
The rake formations of all the operational versions of the train are given below:

Abbreviations

- DTC – Driving Trailer Coach
- NDTC – Non-Driving Trailer Coach
- MC – Motor Coach
- MC2 – Motor Coach with electrical change-over switch
- MC3 – 180° rotated MC2
- TC – Trailer Coach having Pantograph
- EC – Executive Chair Car (2x2 seats)
- CC – Economy Chair Car (3x2 seats)

Rake formation of 1st generation 16-car Vande Bharat Express
Coach Sr. No.	1	2	3	4	5	6	7	8	9	10	11	12	13	14	15	16
Travel Class	CC							EC		CC						
Power Configuration	DTC	MC	TC	MC2	NDTC	MC	TC	MC2	NDTC	MC	TC	MC2	MC3	TC	MC	DTC
Basic Power Units	Unit 1				Unit 2				Unit 3				Unit 4			
Seating Capacity	44	78	78	78	78	78	78	52	52	78	78	78	78	78	78	44

Rake formation of the 2nd generation 16-car Vande Bharat Express
Coach Sr. No.	1	2	3	4	5	6	7	8	9	10	11	12	13	14	15	16
Travel Class	CC							EC		CC						
Power Configuration	DTC	MC	TC	MC2	MC	TC	MC2	NDTC	NDTC	MC2	TC	MC	MC2	TC	MC	DTC
Basic Power Units	Unit 1				Unit 2				Unit 3				Unit 4			
Seating Capacity	44	78	78	78	78	78	78	52	52	78	78	78	78	78	78	44

Rake formation of the 2nd generation 8-car Vande Bharat Express
Coach Sr. No.	1	2	3	4	5	6	7	8
Travel Class	CC		EC	CC				
Power Configuration	DTC	MC	TC	MC2	MC2	TC	MC	DTC
Basic Power Units	Unit 1				Unit 2			
Seating Capacity	44	78	52	78	78	78	78	44

Rake formation of 2nd generation 20-car Vande Bharat Express
Coach Sr. No.	1	2	3	4	5	6	7	8	9	10	11	12	13	14	15	16	17	18	19	20
Travel Class	CC							EC		CC										
Power Configuration	DTC	MC	TC	MC2	MC	TC	MC2	NDTC	NDTC	MC2	TC	MC	NDTC	MC2	TC	MC	MC2	TC	MC	DTC
Basic Power Units	Unit 1				Unit 2				Unit 3				Unit 4				Unit 5			
Seating Capacity	44	78	78	78	78	78	78	52	52	78	78	78	78	78	78	78	78	78	78	44

== Future ==
The following EMU trainsets which are influenced by the Vande Bharat are currently in the preliminary stages of design and will be introduced in the near future.

=== Sleeper Trainsets ===
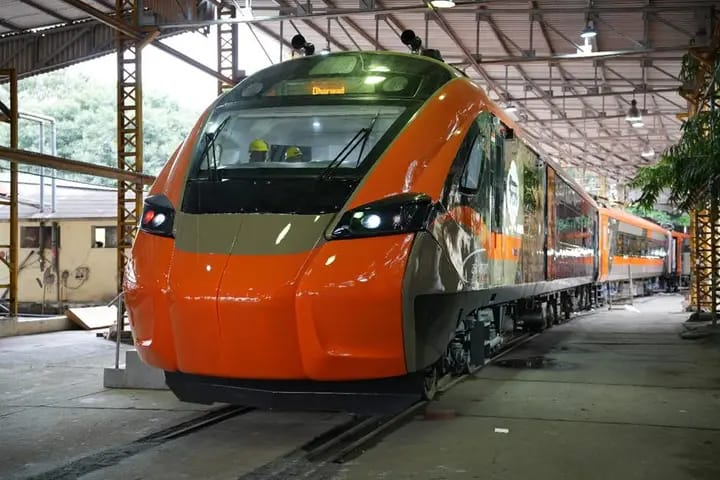
Vande Bharat Sleeper prototype by BEML

The sleeper EMU trainsets are being built with sleeper coaches for long-distance travel. They will have three classes: 1A, 2A and 3A. The train is expected to have a maximum speed of 220 km/h (140 mph) and a design life of 35 years. It is expected to be lighter, energy efficient as well as have better passenger amenities than the Vande Bharat. Half of the trainsets will have coaches made of steel, while the other half will have coaches made of aluminium with articulated bogies.

Indian Railways invited bids to design and manufacture 200 trainsets in April-2022. The agency estimated that it would cost ₹260 billion (equivalent to ₹300 billion or US$3.2 billion in 2026). The estimate includes the cost of upgrading infrastructure at either the Marathwada Rail Coach Factory in Latur or ICF where the train is planned to be manufactured. A further ₹320 billion (equivalent to ₹370 billion or US$4.0 billion in 2026) will be paid to the winning bidders over a 35-year period for maintenance. The bidders would be required to build the first prototype of this trainset within 24 months of being awarded the contract.

=== Gati Shakti Train (Cargo Variant) ===
It is also known as Freight EMU, supposedly to be used mainly to carry parcels of e-commerce companies, which is presently done via roadways. Indian Railways is planning to build 25 such trainsets to augment its freight market share in freight logistics from 28% to 40% by 2030 as a part of the government's "PM Gati Shakti" initiative. In October-2022, Indian Railway announced that ICF is designing the cargo version of Vande Bharat which will be tested by the Research Designs and Standards Organisation (RDSO) before final commissioning. The freight EMU rakes could reach an operational speed of 160 kmph and the rakes are being designed for palletized container transportation. In March-2026, Indian Railway said that they are testing the first prototype where they will test multiple checks, including oscillation testing, emergency braking distance (EBD) evaluation and full-load performance assessments. The first prototype of 16-car EMU rake is designed to carry weight up to 264 tonnes at a maximum speed of 160 km/h.

Indian Railways commenced trial run on the Ahmedabad-Mumbai route in September 2026.

=== Tilting Technology ===
The tilting technology which aids the train in maintaining its speed on the curved sections is likely to be implemented in the future EMU trainsets which are planned to have a maximum speed of more than 200 km/h (120 mph). This will mark the first commercial deployment of such technology in India. The coaches are proposed to be made of a lightweight aluminium alloy and are expected to feature improved passenger amenities such as a 3-pin socket and USB power socket for every passenger, zero discharge toilet systems, and facilities to accommodate passengers travelling in wheelchairs. The trains will also have a cattle guard that can absorb collisions with animals up to 600 kilograms (1,300 pounds) in weight and keep animals from being dragged under the train in the event of a collision.

=== Other Variants ===
The ICF is developing variants for suburban and short-distance services. The suburban variant is a 15-coach train with a carrying capacity of 6,000 people. The short distance variant that will replace existing MEMU services, will have eight coaches with a carrying capacity of 2,400 people. As directed by the Indian Railway Board, the ICF will launch a model for Jammu and Kashmir in 2024.

== Export ==
After the train's inauguration, Indian Railways reportedly received queries of interest from some countries in Southeast Asia and South America. A board member of the Indian Railways stated that the train could be modified according to customer needs. A railways official stated in November 2022 that the Ministry of Railways were preparing a roadmap to begin exports of Vande Bharat trainsets by 2026. Exports would only begin after 475 trainsets are built for domestic use.

=== Test Track ===
Indian Railways is constructing a 59 km (37 mi) long dedicated standard gauge track between Gudha and Thathana Mithri in the Jodhpur Division to conduct trial runs at speeds of up to 220 km/h (140 mph). The track is expected to be completed by December-2025.

== See also ==
- Amrit Bharat (trainset) – Indian push-pull trainsets
- Namo Bharat (trainset) – Indian electric multiple unit train used for regional rapid train services
- B28 trainset – Upcoming Indian high speed train type
